= George Clark (producer) =

British film actor and film producer (1888–1946)

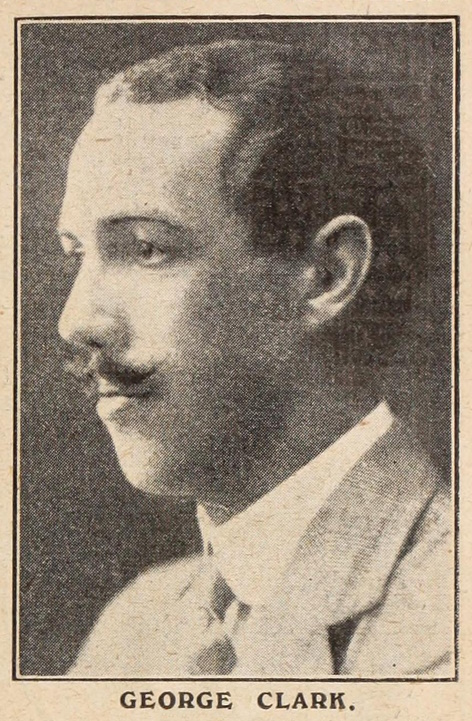

George Clark was a British film producer during the silent era. For many years Clark worked with the British star Guy Newall, whom he had met during the First World War. Together they founded Lucky Cat Films and later George Clark Productions, securing a distribution arrangement with the larger Stoll Pictures. George Clark Productions constructed studio facilities at Beaconsfield in Buckinghamshire, north-west of London, which was opened in May 1922. The films made by the company were often critically acclaimed, but George Clark Productions suffered from the general downturn in the British film industry after 1922 due to the heavy competition from American film distributors. Beaconsfield Studios was sold in 1927 and the company was dissolved in 1932. By 1933 Clark was working for a film distribution company.

== Biography ==
=== Pre-war years ===
George Clark was described as "a very wealthy manufacturer".

Clark had a "keen liking for photography, on which subject he may claim to be an expert".

=== The war years ===
Clark joined the Royal Garrison Artillery (RGA), operating anti-aircraft guns as part of Britain's air defences against bombing raids by German aircraft and Zeppelin airships. It was during his service in the RGA, on military duty at a defence station at Dover, that Clark met Guy Newall, who was also serving as an anti-aircraft gunner, beginning an association which led to the foundation of a film company after the war. Newall was an actor with theatrical experience who had gained some pre-war experience in film-making by playing small parts and writing scenarios for productions by the London Film Company, founded in 1913. The two men formed the idea of founding an all-British film company as a commercial proposition. They shared a belief "in the superior talent of British players" and formed a plan for demonstrating "to the world the possibilities of all-British pictures". As Clark described the meeting: "In solemn conclave assembled we carefully considered ways and means, and soon a definite plan of campaign was mapped out".

=== Lucky Cat Films ===
After the war ended Clark and Newall founded Lucky Cat Films with Clark as the business manager and Newall as a leading actor and with artistic control. They assembled a team made up of camera operators Bert Ford and Joe Rosenthal (jnr.), set designer Charles Dalmon and directors Kenelm Foss and Arthur Rooke. The other important relationship integral to the success of the new enterprise was Newall's partnership with Ivy Duke, a musical-comedy actress. Newall had met Duke during the war and she was persuaded to join Lucky Cat Films as his leading lady. In July 1919 it was reported that Lucky Cat Films aimed to produce "good comedies" for the screen, "without extravagance in scenery or situation... with an English background". The account added: "Everything is to be English, the company, the settings, and, it is to be hoped, the style of humour".

Lucky Cat Films completed four comedies in quick succession, released from June to September 1919, working from cramped studios in Ebury Street in Central London. The Lucky Cat films were distributed by the Ideal Film Company. Ivy Duke played the leading lady in each of the four Lucky Cat films, with Newall in a lead role in two of them (I Will and Fancy Dress). Newall, together with Frank Miller, wrote the screenplay for The March Hare, which was set in the New Forest.^{[B]}

=== George Clark Productions ===
Towards the end of 1919 Clark and Newall began operating their partnership under the name of George Clark Productions and announced plans to construct a new modern film studio at Beaconsfield in Buckinghamshire, north-west of London. Beaconsfield was chosen for its proximity to London, but the site was outside the zone subject to "the notorious London fog" in order to maximise conditions for daylight filming. Beaconsfield had the added advantage of nearby country locations and a connection to London by a reliable railway service. The partnership secured an arrangement with the Stoll Film Corporation of America to distribute their entire output.

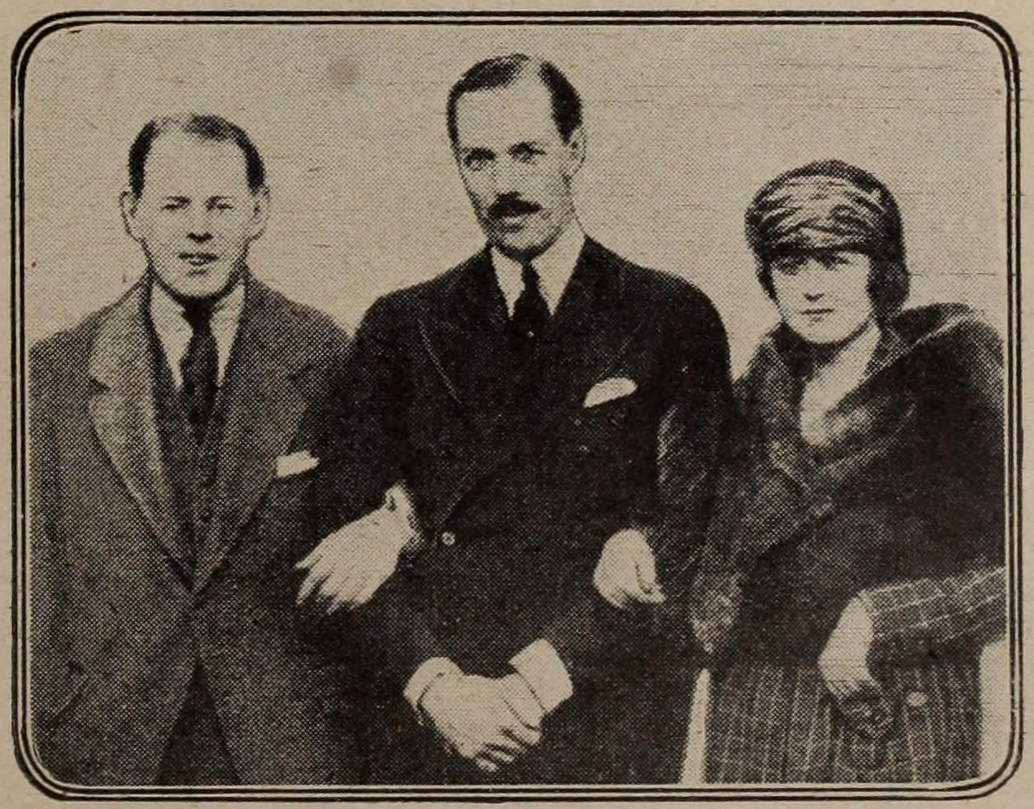
George Clark (centre) with the stars of George Clark Productions, Guy Newall and Ivy Duke.

George Clark Productions completed a series of films from December 1919 to mid-year 1923, in the process of which Newall extended his skills and experience as a writer and director.^{[C]} The first release under the new name was in December 1919: The Garden of Resurrection was directed by Arthur Rooke and featured Newall and Duke in the lead roles. The film was scripted by Newall, based on a novel by E. Temple Thurston. Newall wrote the screenplays for another eleven films produced by George Clark Productions, most of them adaptations of novels. All but a couple of the films produced by George Clark Productions in the period up until July 1923 featured Guy Newall and Ivy Duke in lead acting roles. The exceptions were Testimony, a drama released in September 1920 that was directed by Newall, with Ivy Duke and David Hawthorne in the leading roles and The Mirage (released in December 1920), for which Newall and Duke shared the credit for the screenplay. Testimony was Newall's debut as a director, a film for which he also wrote the screenplay (based on a novel by Alice and Claude Askew).

George Clark Productions Ltd. was registered as a company in October 1920 with capital of fifty thousand pounds, with Clark as company president, Newall as the managing director and S. M. Johnson as secretary. After raising finance for the project, construction of the Beaconsfield Studios commenced in 1921. In about January 1921, while the studios were under construction, Newall took the film-making personnel to Nice, on the French Riviera, where he directed The Bigamist and The Persistent Lovers over a seven month period, films for which he also wrote the screenplays and acted in the leading male roles. After returning from France Newall took his actors and production company to the New Forest and Salisbury Plain to film Boy Woodburn and Fox Farm (released in May and July 1922). The most successful of the company's films was The Bigamist, released in August 1921, which was one of only a few English productions at that time to enjoy a run at an established London theatre (the Alhambra).

The films made by George Clark Productions were released in the United States through Stoll, with some being moderately successful. In particular, Newall's The Bigamist was highly regarded and was "exported with comparative success". In the early 1920s Newall was described as "the leading spirit of the movement among English film producers who aspire to make British films which shall compete with American productions on their own ground".

Clark arrived in New York in late January 1921 for the stated purpose of visiting his family and "to study film conditions". He was accompanied by Miss Leila Lewis of the firm of Landy & Turnbull, who was handling publicity in England for George Clark Productions. During her visit Miss Lewis made arrangements to co-ordinate publicity with the Stoll Film Corporation, the company's American distributors. Clark and Lewis returned to England in mid-February after Clark had made a trip to Palm Beach in Florida. Less than a month later Clark returned to New York for another short stay. He based himself at the offices of Stoll Film Corporation at 130 West Forty-sixth Street, intending to "look over the American field with a view to becoming better acquainted with conditions and to start a campaign for his two stars, Ivy Duke and Guy Newall".

In early 1922 an association of British film producers and exhibitors called the British National Film League was formed to support local film production against competition from American films. Clark was initially elected president of the body.

=== Beaconsfield Studios ===
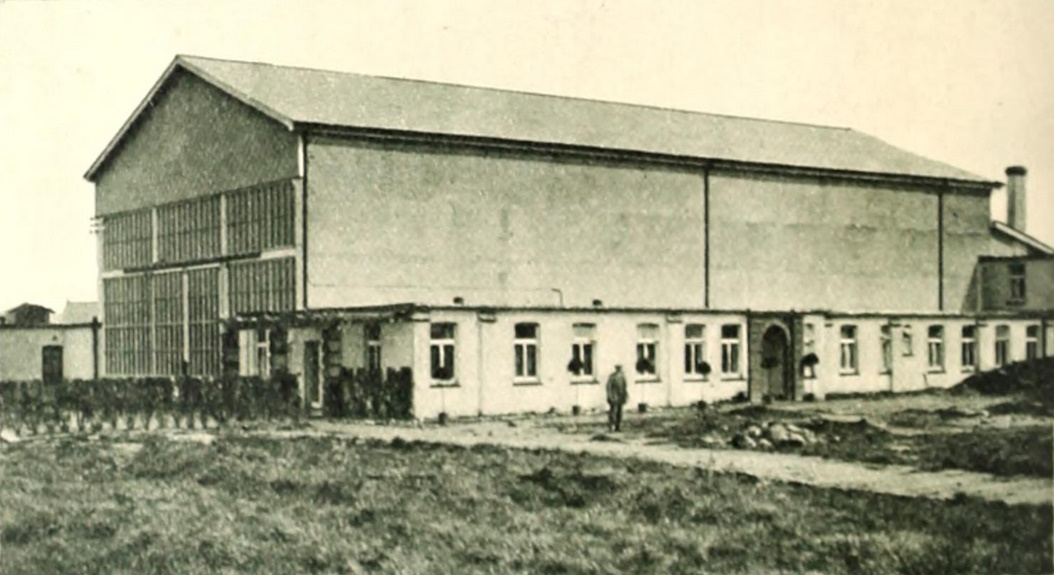
"Exterior view of new George Clark studios at Beaconsfield", published in Pictures and Picturegoer, July 1923.

The Beaconsfield Studios were officially opened in May 1922. The main studio space measured approximately 120 feet (37 m) by 60 feet (18 m), with a height of 28 feet (8.5 m). The studios had their own developing and printing facilities, as well as a power generating plant independent of the local power supply. Land adjoining the building was set aside as a sports ground for the staff. The interiors of The Starlit Garden (released in July 1923) were filmed in the Beaconsfield Studios, the last of Newall's films for George Clark Productions.

The film historian Rachael Low described the acting partnership of Newall and Duke in the following terms: "their combined realistic, shrewd and humorous observation of the interplay of personal relations was a refreshing contrast to the stock figures portrayed in most contemporary films". In her biography of Newall for the British Film Institute, Christine Gledhill wrote that in his films for George Clark Productions Newall "developed a pathos-laden, if whimsically ironic, protagonist defined by social marginalisation and personal isolation". His characters were described as "unloved, misunderstood and wryly self-deprecating oddballs". His films ("a series of stylish fantasies, laced with wry humour") depicted "his outsider heroes" as they confronted realities of post-war Britain such as a corrupted and declining aristocracy and changing class and gender relations. In December 1920, on the occasion of the release of Squandered Lives (the film Duke's Son, featuring Newall and Ivy Duke in the lead roles, renamed for the American market), an article in Moving Picture World observed: "The partisans of Mr. Newall with large justification insist he is one of the screen's most natural actors as well as one of its most skillful character delineators". Although Newall's more nuanced and serious performances in the George Clark Productions films of the early 1920s differed considerably from the earlier Lucky Cat comedies, reviews in the British press and audiences "responded positively to this new direction", even to the extent of him being named at that time as "Britain's finest actor".

In May 1922 it was reported that George Clark Productions had changed its "style and title" to "George Clark Pictures, Limited, Guy Newall Productions".

In a November 1922 review of A Maid of the Silver Sea the writer for an American film-trade magazine was critical of the film's plot, stating that "the story value is, in our opinion, a very negligible quantity". The reviewer categorised George Clark Productions' general approach to film-making as privileging the novelty of location over the value of the story, adding: "The more the George Clark productions change, the more they appear to remain the same thing – an attractive enough thing in its way, but apt to become a trifle wearisome when it is merely a matter of transferring Guy Newall and Ivy Duke to fresh woods and pastures new and then giving us the mixture as before". A British trade journal echoed the American opinion, describing the film as "mediocre" and "full of defects".

In December 1922 Harry L. Reichenbach filed a suit in the Supreme Court against George Clark Pictures Inc., alleging that the company had signed a contract in December 1921 with him to act as general manager for a set period. Reichenbach's employment commenced in early March 1922, but he was terminated four months later.

=== Film industry downturn ===
The London office of George Clark Pictures Ltd. was at 47 Berners Street, Museum. There had been a general downturn in the British film industry after 1922 due to the heavy competition from American film distributors. In about July 1924 the film distribution company Ducal Films Ltd., with Steve Slinger as general manager, was formed in London to handle films made by George Clark Productions.

In 1924 F. Martin Thornton directed two films produced by George Clark Productions, both of which were distributed by Ducal:

- Women and Diamonds (Conscripts of Misfortune) (released in June 1924).
- Mutiny (Diana of the Islands) (released in January 1925).

In October 1924 the Beaconsfield Studios were hired by Britannia Films to make Afraid of Love. The facilities were also leased to Anglia Films. The Beaconsfield Studios fell into disuse by early 1925 due to the prevailing slump in British film production. In February 1926 British National Pictures leased the Beaconsfield Studios.

By about 1925 it appears that George Clark Productions and its directors were experiencing financial problems. In October 1925 it was reported that "a receiving order had been made against Guy Newall on the petition of a creditor". The report added that Newall was "the producer and star of the George Clark pictures... during the film 'boom'". It was reported in October 1926 that the film distribution company Ducal Films Ltd. had gone into liquidation.

In 1927 the Beaconsfield facilities were sold to the British Lion Film Corporation for £52,785, in anticipation of government legislation being introduced to support the British film industry. The sale of the studio was facilitated by Archbald Osborne who had joined George Clark Pictures Ltd. in 1922 as a director and secretary. After the sale to the British Lion Corporation Osborne carried on as general manager of Beaconsfield Studios, working for the new owners.

The company George Clark Pictures Ltd. was dissolved in 1932.

In 1933 it was recorded that George Clark "now produces for P.D.C. distribution".

== Filmography ==
- I Will (June 1919), Lucky Cat Films
- The Double Life of Mr. Alfred Burton (June 1919), Lucky Cat Films
- The March Hare (August 1919), Lucky Cat Films
- Fancy Dress (September 1919), Lucky Cat Films
- The Garden of Resurrection (December 1919), George Clark Productions
- The Lure of Crooning Water (January 1920), George Clark Productions
- Duke's Son (Squandered Lives) (June 1920), George Clark Productions
- Testimony (September 1920), George Clark Productions
- The Mirage (December 1920), George Clark Productions
- The Bigamist (August 1921), George Clark Productions
- Beauty and the Beast (January 1922), George Clark Productions
- The Persistent Lovers (April 1922), George Clark Productions
- Boy Woodburn (May 1922), George Clark Productions
- Fox Farm (July 1922), George Clark Productions
- A Maid of the Silver Sea (November 1922), George Clark Productions
- The Starlit Garden (July 1923), George Clark Productions
- Women and Diamonds (Conscripts of Misfortune) (June 1924), George Clark Productions
- Mutiny (Diana of the Islands) (January 1925), George Clark Productions
