= List of British films of 1922 =

A list of British films released in 1922.

== 1922 ==
Title	Director	Cast	Genre	Notes
1922
A Bachelor's Baby	Arthur Rooke	Constance Worth, Malcolm Tod	Comedy	
Belonging	Floyd Martin Thornton	Hugh Buckler, Barbara Hoffe	Crime	
Bentley's Conscience	Denison Clift	Betty Faire, Henry Victor	Drama	
A Bill of Divorcement	Denison Clift	Constance Binney, Fay Compton	Drama	
The Bohemian Girl	Harley Knoles	Gladys Cooper, Ivor Novello	Romance	
Boy Woodburn	Guy Newall	Guy Newall, Ivy Duke	Sport	
Brown Sugar	Fred Paul	Owen Nares, Lillian Hall-Davis	Romance	
Bulldog Drummond	Oscar Apfel	Carlyle Blackwell, Evelyn Greeley	Crime	
The Call of the East	Bert Wynne	Warwick Ward, Doris Eaton	Drama	
The Card	A. V. Bramble	Laddie Cliff, Joan Barry	Comedy	
Charles Augustus Milverton	George Ridgwell	Eille Norwood, Hubert Willis	Mystery	
Cocaine	Graham Cutts	Hilda Bayley, Flora Le Breton	Crime	
Creation	Humberston Wright	Dorothy Fane, William Freshman	Drama	
The Crimson Circle	George Ridgwell	Fred Groves, Mary Odette	Crime	
A Debt of Honour	Maurice Elvey	Isobel Elsom, Clive Brook	Drama	
Diana of the Crossways	Denison Clift	Fay Compton, Henry Victor	Drama	
Dick Turpin's Ride to York	Maurice Elvey	Matheson Lang, Isobel Elsom	Historical drama	
Dicky Monteith	Kenelm Foss	Stewart Rome, Joan Morgan	Drama	
Down Under Donovan	Harry Lambart	Bertram Parnell, William Lugg	Crime	
The Eleventh Hour	George Ridgwell	Madge White, Dennis Wyndham	Drama	
The Experiment	Sinclair Hill	Evelyn Brent, Clive Brook	Drama	
Expiation	Sinclair Hill	Ivy Close, Fred Raynham	Crime	
The Faithful Heart	Fred Paul	Owen Nares, Lillian Hall-Davis	Drama	
False Evidence	Harold M. Shaw	Edna Flugrath, Cecil Humphreys	Drama	
Fires of Innocence	Sidney Morgan	Joan Morgan, Bobby Andrews	Drama	
Flames of Passion	Graham Cutts	Mae Marsh, C. Aubrey Smith	Drama	
Fox Farm	Guy Newall	Guy Newall, Ivy Duke	Drama	
The Game of Life	G. B. Samuelson	Isobel Elsom, Lillian Hall-Davis	Historical	
A Gipsy Cavalier	J. Stuart Blackton	Georges Carpentier, Flora le Breton	Drama	
The Glorious Adventure	J. Stuart Blackton	Diana Manners, Victor McLaglen	Historical	
The Grass Orphan	Frank Hall Crane	Margaret Bannerman, Reginald Owen	Drama	
The Green Caravan	Edwin J. Collins	Catherine Calvert, Gregory Scott	Drama	
Half a Truth	Sinclair Hill	Lawford Davidson, Miles Mander	Crime	
The Head of the Family	Manning Haynes	Johnny Butt, Moore Marriott	Comedy	
His Wife's Husband	George A. Cooper	Madge Stuart, Olaf Hytten	Drama	
The House of Peril	Kenelm Foss	Fay Compton, Roy Travers	Crime	
If Four Walls Told	Fred Paul	Lillian Hall-Davis, John Stuart	Drama	
The Knight Errant	George Ridgwell	Madge Stuart, Rex McDougall	Romance	
Lamp in the Desert	F. Martin Thornton	Gladys Jennings, Louis Willoughby	Drama	
The Lilac Sunbonnet	Sidney Morgan	Lewis Dayton, Nell Emerald	Romance	
Little Brother of God	F. Martin Thornton	Alec Fraser, Lionelle Howard	Western	
The Little Mother	A. V. Bramble	Florence Turner, John Stuart	Crime	
The Lonely Lady of Grosvenor Square	Sinclair Hill	Betty Faire, Jack Hobbs	Drama	
Long Odds	A.E. Coleby	Fred Paul, Garry Marsh	Sports	
A Lost Leader	George Ridgwell	Robert English, Dorothy Fane	Crime	
Love and a Whirlwind	Duncan McRae, Harold M. Shaw	Clive Brook, Marjorie Hume	Crime	
Love's Boomerang	John S. Robertson	Ann Forrest, David Powell	Crime	
Love's Influence	William S. Charlton, Edward Gordon	George K. Arthur, Flora le Breton	Drama	
A Lowland Cinderella	Sidney Morgan	Joan Morgan, Ralph Forbes	Drama	
A Maid of the Silver Sea	Guy Newall	Guy Newall, Ivy Duke	Drama	
Man and His Kingdom	Maurice Elvey	Harvey Braban, Bertram Burleigh	Adventure	
The Man from Home	George Fitzmaurice	James Kirkwood, Anna Q. Nilsson	Drama	
Married to a Mormon	H. B. Parkinson	Evelyn Brent, Clive Brook	Drama	
A Master of Craft	Thomas Bentley	Fred Groves, Mercy Hatton	Comedy	
Melody of Death	F. Martin Thornton	H. Agar Lyons, Frank Petley	Crime	
The Missioner	George Ridgwell	Cyril Percival, Pauline Peters	Crime	
Mord Em'ly	George Pearson	Betty Balfour, Rex Davis	Drama	
No. 7 Brick Row	Fred W. Durrant	Constance Worth, Marjorie Villis	Crime	
The Nonentity	Sinclair Hill	Annette Benson, Hugh Buckler	Adventure	
Number 13	Alfred Hitchcock	Clare Greet, Ernest Thesiger	Drama	Hitchcock's first film. Production was pulled and no footage is known to exist.
Open Country	Sinclair Hill	Dorinea Shirley, David Hawthorne	Drama	
Pages of Life	Adelqui Migliar	Evelyn Brent, Jack Trevor	Drama	
The Passionate Friends	Maurice Elvey	Milton Rosmer, Fred Raynham	Romance	
The Pauper Millionaire	Frank Hall Crane	C.M. Hallard, Norma Whalley	Comedy	
The Peacemaker	A. E. Coleby	Maud Yates, Humberston Wright	Drama	
The Persistent Lovers	Guy Newall	Guy Newall, Ivy Duke	Romance	
Petticoat Loose	George Ridgwell	Dorinea Shirley, Warwick Ward	Drama	
The Pointing Finger	George Ridgwell	Milton Rosmer, Madge Stuart	Thriller	
Possession	Louis Mercanton	Malvina Longfellow, Reginald Owen	Drama	Co-production with France
Potter's Clay	H. Grenville-Taylor; Douglas Payne	Ellen Terry, Dick Webb	Drama	
A Prince of Lovers	Charles Calvert	Howard Gaye, Marjorie Hume	Historical	
The Recoil	Geoffrey Malins	Annie Esmond, Eille Norwood	Crime	
Repentance	Edward Gordon	Peggy Hathaway, Geoffrey Benstead	Drama	
Rob Roy	W. P. Kellino	David Hawthorne, Gladys Jennings	Historical	
A Rogue in Love	Albert Brouett	Frank Stanmore, Ann Trevor	Drama	
A Romance of Old Baghdad	Kenelm Foss	Matheson Lang, Manora Thew	Historical	
Running Water	Maurice Elvey	Madge Stuart, Lawford Davidson	Drama	
A Sailor Tramp	F. Martin Thornton	Victor McLaglen, Pauline Johnson	Adventure	
Sam's Boy	Manning Haynes	Johnny Butt, Tom Coventry	Comedy	
The Scarlet Lady	Walter West	Violet Hopson, Louis Willoughby	Sports	
The Scarlett Letter	Challis Sanderson	Sybil Thorndike, Dick Webb	Drama	
The Scourge	Geoffrey Malins	Madge Stuart, Joseph R. Tozer	Drama	
Shirley	A. V. Bramble	Clive Brook, Elizabeth Irving	Drama	
Silent Evidence	E. H. Calvert	David Hawthorne, Marjorie Hume	Mystery	
Simple Simon	Henry Edwards	Henry Edwards, Chrissie White	Romance	
Sinister Street	George Beranger	John Stuart, Maudie Dunham	Melodrama	
A Sister to Assist 'Er	George Dewhurst	Mary Brough, Polly Emery	Comedy	
The Skipper's Wooing	Manning Haynes	Gordon Hopkirk, Johnny Butt	Comedy	
Son of Kissing Cup	Walter West	Violet Hopson, Stewart Rome	Comedy	
A Soul's Awakening	W. P. Kellino	David Hawthorne, Flora le Breton	Drama	
The Spanish Jade	John S. Robertson	David Powell, Marc McDermott	Drama	
A Sporting Double	Arthur Rooke	John Stuart, Lilian Douglas	Sport/drama	
The Sporting Instinct	Arthur Rooke	Lilian Douglas, Mickey Brantford	Drama	
Squibs Wins the Calcutta Sweep	George Pearson	Betty Balfour, Fred Groves	Comedy	
Stable Companions	Albert Ward	Clive Brook, Lillian Hall-Davis	Sports	
A Tale of Two Cities	Walter Courtney Rowden	Clive Brook, Ann Trevor	Drama	
Tell Your Children	Donald Crisp	Doris Eaton, Warwick Ward	Drama	Feature's Charles Hawtrey's onscreen debut, albeit uncredited
Thou Shalt Not	George Beranger	Gertrude McCoy, Zoe Palmer	Crime	
Three Live Ghosts	George Fitzmaurice	Norman Kerry, Anna Q. Nilsson	Comedy	
Trapped by the Mormons	H. B. Parkinson	Evelyn Brent, Louis Willoughby	Drama	
The Truants	Sinclair Hill	Joan Morgan, George Bellamy	Drama	
Vanity Fair	Walter Courtney Rowden	Clive Brook, Douglas Munro	Drama	Adaptation of the novel Vanity Fair
Walter Makes a Movie	Walter Forde	Walter Forde, Pauline Peters	Comedy	
Was She Justified?	Walter West	Florence Turner, Ivy Close	Drama	
Weavers of Fortune	Arthur Rooke	Henry Vibart, Dacia	Adventure	
Wee MacGregor's Sweetheart	George Pearson	Betty Balfour, Donald Macardle	Romance	
The Wheels of Chance	Harold M. Shaw	George K. Arthur, Judd Green	Comedy	
When Greek Meets Greek	Walter West	Violet Hopson, Stewart Rome	Comedy	
The White Hope	Frank Wilson	Violet Hopson, Stewart Rome	Sport	
A Will and a Way	Manning Haynes	Polly Emery, Johnny Butt	Comedy	
The Wonderful Story	Graham Cutts	Lillian Hall-Davis, Herbert Langley	Drama	

== See also ==
- 1922 in film
- 1922 in the United Kingdom
