= Guy Newall =

British actor, screenwriter, director (1885–1937)

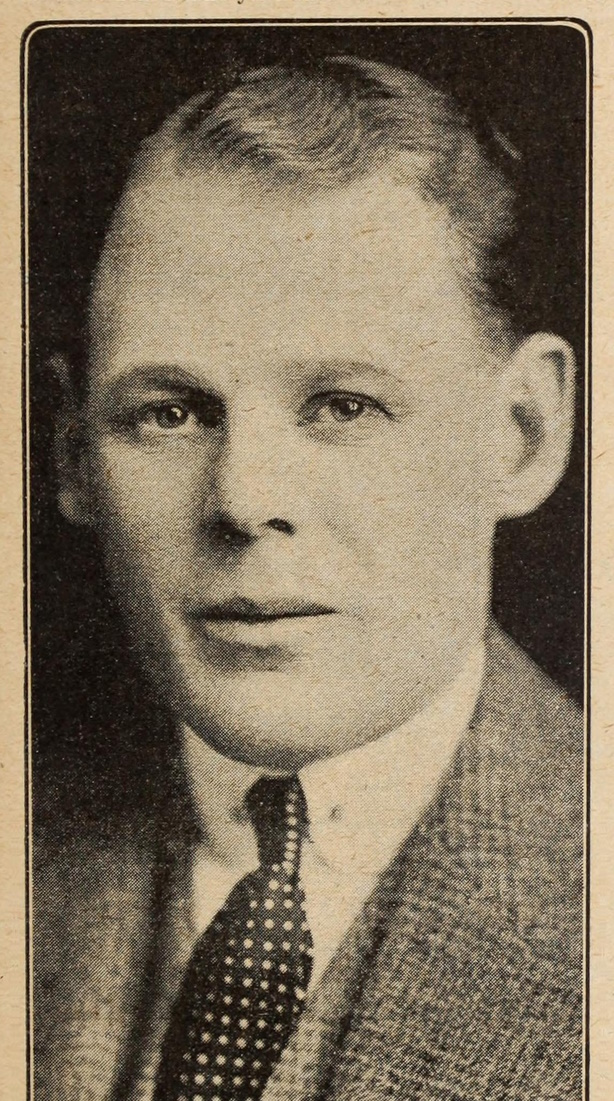
- Photographic portrait of Guy Newall, published in The Picture Show, 27 March 1920.
- Born: Guy Patrick Newall; 25 May 1885; Isle of Wight, England, United Kingdom
- Died: 25 February 1937 (aged 51); Hampstead, London, England, United Kingdom
- Occupations: Film actor, screenwriter, film director
- Years active: 1915 - 1937

Guy Newall (25 May 1885 – 25 February 1937) was a British actor, screenwriter and film director in a career that encompassed the silent era of film-making to the early years of sound films.

Newall was a theatre actor who began his film career playing comic roles in the early years of World War I. He joined the war effort as an anti-aircraft gunner, where he met his future business partner George Clark. The heyday of Newall's career was in the post-war period to the early 1920s, where he, in a production company formed with Clark, directed, scripted and acted in the leading roles in a series of highly-regarded films. The actress Ivy Duke, who later became Newall's second wife, played opposite him in these films. During the mid- to late-1920s, with the British film industry in decline due to competition from America, Newall undertook theatre work, including a tour to South Africa, punctuated by an occasional film acting role. By the early 1930s, with the legislated requirement of a quota of British-made films, Newall was employed as both an actor and director in a series of low budget films known as 'quota quickies'. Newall's health began to decline from the mid-1930s and he died in February 1937.

== Biography ==
=== Early years ===
Guy Patrick Newall was born on 25 May 1885 on the Isle of Wight, the eldest child of Colonel Marius Charles Newall, of the Royal Horse Artillery, and Mabel Kathleen (née Bartlett).^{[A]}

Newall gained his first theatrical experience with a travelling pantomime and circus which was touring on the Isle of Wight. A year or so later he found work in London and provincial theatre productions, specialising in comic roles. In addition to acting, Newall also wrote one-act plays and music-hall sketches.

=== Pre-war years ===
Guy Newall and Mary Hancock were married on 26 May 1906 at Sunderland in county Durham.

Newall had a part in the "farcical romance" The Duke of Killiecrankie at the Criterion Theatre and was understudy to the leading man. He was involved with the production "on and off" for two years. In October 1911 Newall played the character of 'J. K. Ainslie' in Same Lodge at the Prince of Wales' Theatre in London.

Newall and his first wife Mary were divorced in 1913. Guy Newall began his film career playing small parts and writing scenarios for productions by the London Film Company, founded in 1913.

=== The war years ===
In May 1914, shortly before the outbreak of World War I in late July, Newall was engaged to play the role of 'Adrian Harper' in The Wynmartens at London's Playhouse Theatre, alongside the established comic actress Marie Tempest. In September 1914 Newall was engaged to undertake a theatrical tour of North America with a company of actors led by Tempest. In mid-September it was reported that Marie Tempest, then "reciting patriotic pieces" at the Empire Theatre in London, "will shortly sail for America". In early October Tempest and her English company began their season in Toronto, Canada, with productions of The Marriage of Kitty and Mary Comes First. Newall was also a cast-member of At the Barn that opened in late November 1914 in the Comedy Theatre in New York, performed by Tempest and her English company.

Newall left Tempest's company in 1915 and returned to England where he was cast in a succession of films produced by the London Film Company. His first role as an acknowledged cast member was in the silent film The Heart of Sister Ann, a drama released in December 1915. He played roles in a further eight films produced by the London Film Company that were released in Britain in the period January 1916 to January 1917. Seven of the eight were directed by Maurice Elvey, including two – Money for Nothing and Trouble for Nothing – for which Newall wrote the screenplays as well as playing the recurring lead character of 'Rev. Cuthbert Cheese'. One of the films directed by Elvey, Driven, was renamed Desperation for its release in the United States in March 1917. The Manxman, in which Newall had a small role, was directed by the American George Loane Tucker and included extensive footage filmed on location on the Isle of Man. It was released in Britain in November 1916, and in August 1917 in the United States, and was a financial and critical success.

Newall joined the Royal Garrison Artillery (RGA), operating anti-aircraft guns as part of Britain's air defences against bombing raids by German aircraft and Zeppelin airships. It was during his service in the RGA, on military duty at a defence station at Dover, that Newall first met George Clark, who was also serving as an anti-aircraft gunner, beginning an association which led to the foundation of a film company after the war. In the ensuing discussion the two men formed the idea of founding an all-British film company as a commercial proposition. They shared a belief "in the superior talent of British players" and formed a plan for demonstrating "to the world the possibilities of all-British pictures". As Clark described the meeting: "In solemn conclave assembled we carefully considered ways and means, and soon a definite plan of campaign was mapped out".

Newall was cast as an army officer ('Lieutenant Baring') in Comradeship, one of the first films completed after the Armistice, directed by Maurice Elvey for the Stoll Film Company and released in January 1919. It was the first feature film produced by the Stoll company and, in addition to its central inter-class love story, attempted to highlight problems faced by injured soldiers returning from the war. The filming of Comradeship was carried out at around the time of the Armistice and incorporated footage of victory celebrations and captured German guns in its depiction of post-war London.

=== Lucky Cat Films ===
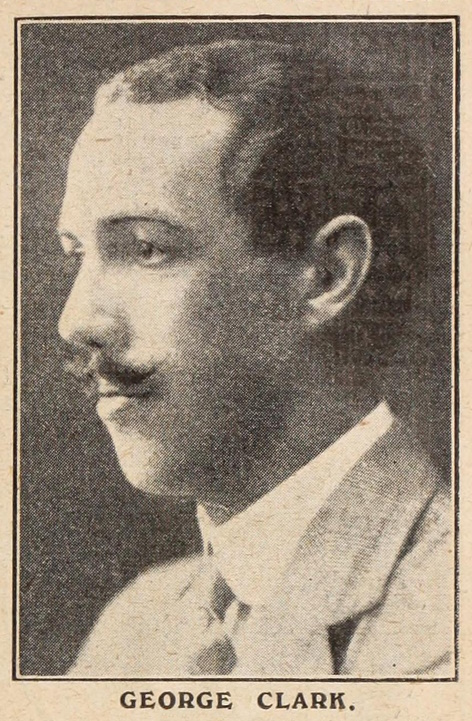
Photographic portrait of George Clark, published in The Picture Show, 6 March 1920.

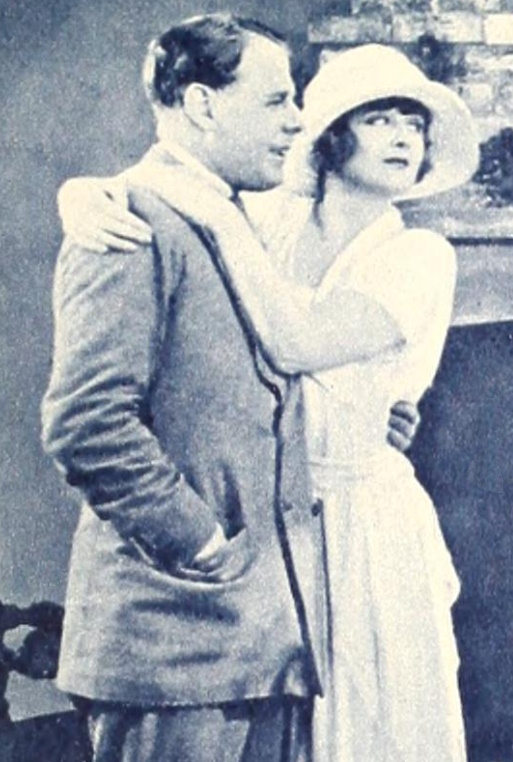
Guy Newall and Ivy Duke in The Persistent Lovers, published in The Picturegoer, May 1922.

After the war ended Clark and Newall founded Lucky Cat Films with Clark as the business manager and Newall as a leading actor and with artistic control. They assembled a team made up of camera operators Bert Ford and Joe Rosenthal (jnr.), set designer Charles Dalmon and directors Kenelm Foss and Arthur Rooke. The other important relationship integral to the success of the new enterprise was Newall's partnership with Ivy Duke, a musical-comedy actress. Newall had met Duke during the war and she was persuaded to join Lucky Cat Films as his leading lady. In July 1919 it was reported that Lucky Cat Films aimed to produce "good comedies" for the screen, "without extravagance in scenery or situation... with an English background". The account added: "Everything is to be English, the company, the settings, and, it is to be hoped, the style of humour".

Lucky Cat Films completed four comedies in quick succession, released from June to September 1919, working from cramped studios in Ebury Street in Central London. The Lucky Cat films were distributed by the Ideal Film Company. Ivy Duke played the leading lady in each of the four Lucky Cat films, with Newall in a lead role in two of them (I Will and Fancy Dress). Newall, together with Frank Miller, wrote the screenplay for The March Hare, which was set in the New Forest.^{[B]}

=== George Clark Productions ===
Towards the end of 1919 Clark and Newall began operating under the name of George Clark Productions and announced plans to construct a new modern film studio at Beaconsfield in Buckinghamshire, north-west of London. George Clark Productions secured an arrangement with the Stoll Film Corporation of America to distribute their entire output.

George Clark Productions completed a series of films from December 1919 to mid-year 1923, in the process of which Newall extended his skills and experience as a writer and director.^{[C]} The first release under the new name was in December 1919: The Garden of Resurrection was directed by Arthur Rooke and featured Newall and Duke in the lead roles. The film was scripted by Newall, based on a novel by E. Temple Thurston. Newall wrote the screenplays for another eleven films produced by George Clark Productions, most of them adaptations of novels. All but a couple of the films produced by George Clark Productions in the period up until July 1923 featured Guy Newall and Ivy Duke in lead acting roles. The exceptions were Testimony, a drama released in September 1920 that was directed by Newall, with Ivy Duke and David Hawthorne in the leading roles and The Mirage (released in December 1920), for which Newall and Duke shared the credit for the screenplay. Testimony was Newall's debut as a director, a film for which he also wrote the screenplay (based on a novel by Alice and Claude Askew).

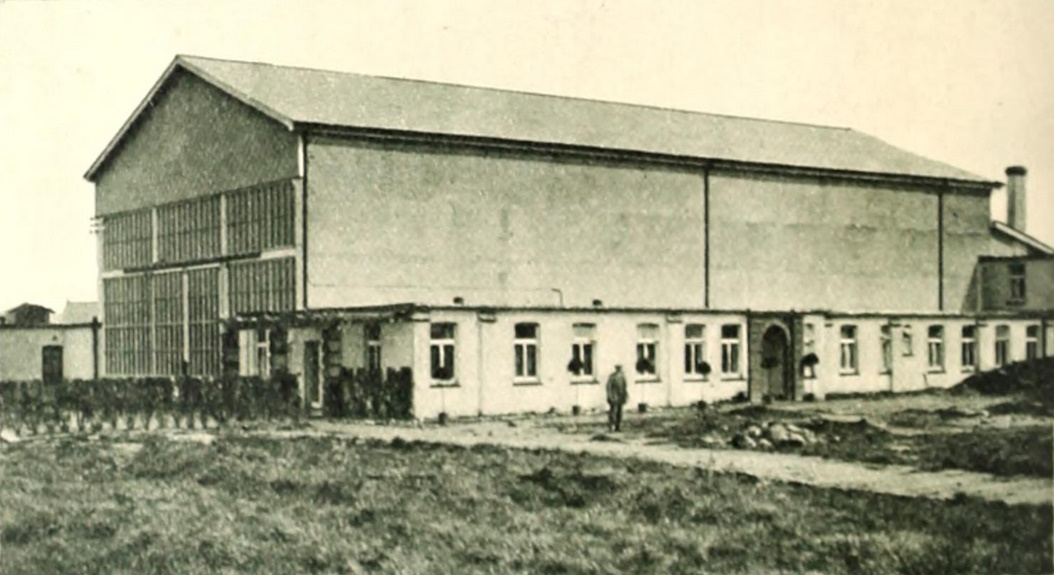
"Exterior view of new George Clark studios at Beaconsfield", published in Pictures and Picturegoer, July 1923.

George Clark Productions Ltd. was registered as a company in October 1920 with capital of fifty thousand pounds, with Clark as company president and Newall as the managing director. After raising finance for the project, construction of the Beaconsfield Studios commenced in 1921. While the studios were still under construction Newall took the company to Nice, on the French Riviera, where he directed The Bigamist and The Persistent Lovers, films for which he also wrote the screenplays and acted in the leading male roles. After returning from France Newall took his actors and production company to the New Forest and Salisbury Plain to film Boy Woodburn and Fox Farm (released in May and July 1922), films for which he had full artistic control as director, screenwriter and actor.

The films made by George Clark Productions were released in the United States through Stoll, with some being moderately successful. In particular, Newall's The Bigamist was highly regarded and was "exported with comparative success". In the early 1920s Newall was described as "the leading spirit of the movement among English film producers who aspire to make British films which shall compete with American productions on their own ground".

The Beaconsfield Studios were officially opened in May 1922. The interiors of The Starlit Garden (released in July 1923) were filmed in the Beaconsfield Studios, the last of Newall's films for George Clark Productions. In October 1924 the studio was hired by Britannia Films to make Afraid of Love, but afterwards fell into disuse due to a slump in British film production due to competition from American film distributors. In 1929 the studios were sold to the British Lion Film Corporation.

Guy Newall and Ivy Duke were married in November 1922 in Kensington, London.

The film historian Rachael Low described the acting partnership of Newall and Duke in the following terms: "their combined realistic, shrewd and humorous observation of the interplay of personal relations was a refreshing contrast to the stock figures portrayed in most contemporary films". In her biography of Newall for the British Film Institute, Christine Gledhill wrote that in his films for George Clark Productions Newall "developed a pathos-laden, if whimsically ironic, protagonist defined by social marginalisation and personal isolation". His characters were described as "unloved, misunderstood and wryly self-deprecating oddballs". His films ("a series of stylish fantasies, laced with wry humour") depicted "his outsider heroes" as they confronted realities of post-war Britain such as a corrupted and declining aristocracy and changing class and gender relations. In December 1920, on the occasion of the release of Squandered Lives (the film Duke's Son, featuring Newall and Ivy Duke in the lead roles, renamed for the American market), an article in Moving Picture World observed: "The partisans of Mr. Newall with large justification insist he is one of the screen's most natural actors as well as one of its most skillful character delineators". Although Newall's more nuanced and serious performances in the George Clark Productions films of the early 1920s differed considerably from the earlier Lucky Cat comedies, reviews in the British press and audiences "responded positively to this new direction", even to the extent of him being named at that time as "Britain's finest actor".

There had been a general downturn in the British film industry after 1922 due to heavy competition from the United States. After completing The Starlit Garden in July 1923 Newall largely confined himself to his home in the Norfolk Broads to concentrate on writing a novel.

=== Later career ===
In 1924 Newall was a cast-member of What the Butler Saw, directed by George Dewhurst for Dewhurst Productions (released in October 1924). At the same time Duke was in Berlin playing in The Decameron Nights opposite Lionel Barrymore.

In late 1924 Newall and Duke toured the play Husband Love. The three-act play was written and produced by Newall, with himself in the lead role of 'Jim Valentine' and Ivy Duke playing 'Paula Valentine'. On 10 November 1924 Husband Love was performed at the Grand Theatre, Fulham. For the next few years both Newall and Duke appeared regularly on the stage. In June 1925 Newall performed in Mixed Doubles at the Criterion Theatre. In September 1927 he was in When the Blue Hills Laughed. In May 1928 Newall performed in Our Little Wife at the Comedy Theatre, after which he toured in productions of Baby Cyclone and The Ghost Train.

During 1927 and 1928 Newall was involved in several co-productions between Gainsborough Pictures and German film production companies. Newall played the lead role in The Ghost Train (released in September 1927), a film made in collaboration with Phoebus Film at their Staaken Studios in Berlin. It was directed by Géza von Bolváry with a mainly German cast. Newall was also cast in the lead role for Number 17 (released in December 1928), a co-production with Felsom Film filmed at Berlin's Tempelhof Studios (also directed by Von Bolváry). An English version of Number 17 was released in August 1929 with a synchronised musical score and sound effects.

Guy Newall and Ivy Duke were divorced by 1929.

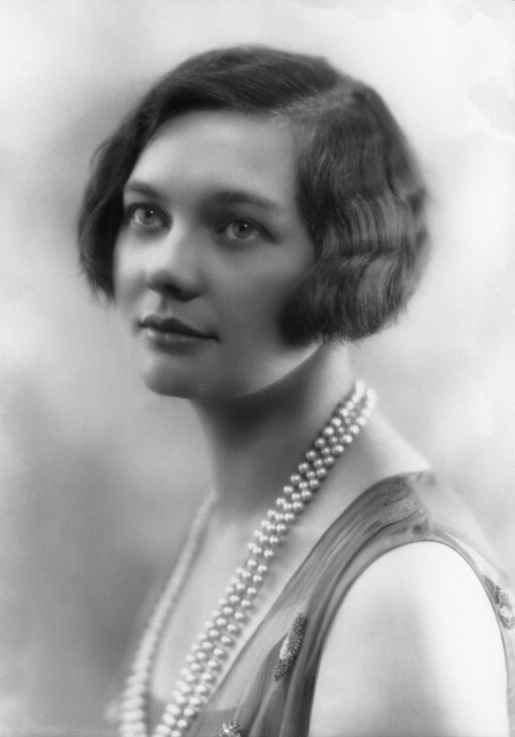
Photographic portrait of Dorothy Batley, dated September 1927 (Newall's third wife).

In May 1929 Guy Newall led a company of actors on a tour of South Africa. The company included Dorothy Batley who played the female lead in the plays Just Married, When the Blue Hills Laughed and 77 Park Lane, performed on the tour.

After their return from South Africa, Guy Newall and Dorothy Batley were married in June 1930 in the Hampstead Registry Office.^{[D]} The couple had a daughter named Susan, born on 19 July 1932 at Eton in Buckinghamshire.

In 1927 the British parliament passed the Cinematograph Films Act, which came into force in April 1928. The Act, intended as a counter to the perceived economic and cultural dominance of Hollywood films, imposed a minimum quota of British films to be shown in British cinemas. One of the consequences of the legislation was the proliferation of inexpensive productions in order for distributors and exhibitors to conform to the legal requirements of the Act. The low-budget British-made films, usually shown as a supporting movie to the featured film, became known as 'quota quickies'. These films were often looked upon with disdain and considered to be cheap and tawdry. The producer Michael Balcon commented: "For many people 'a British film' became the rubbishy second feature you had to sit through, or avoid, if you went to see a Hollywood movie". The Cinematograph Films Act coincided with the advent of the sound film, which within a short space of time replaced the silent film in British cinemas.

In 1930 Newall played the lead role in The Road to Fortune, made by the Starcraft production company and distributed by Paramount. The film was an early example of the 'quota quickies', described by one film historian as "a tedious thriller... redeemed only by the natural beauty of its Cornish exteriors". Newall also appeared in another Starcraft production, The Eternal Feminine, released in February 1931. In 1931 Newall was a cast member of Potiphar's Wife, directed by Maurice Elvey, with Laurence Olivier as the male lead in an early film role.

In the early 1930s Newall worked for Julius Hagen at Twickenham Studios in west London, where he directed six films, most of them with Elizabeth Allan in the lead female role. After Hagan took over management of Twickenham and set up New Art Productions in 1929, he received many commissions to produce 'quota quickies' and maintained a roster of directors for that purpose. He employed veterans of the silent era of film-making, such as Newall, as well as younger directors. The films made at Twickenham made use of the recycling of sets and a stock company of actors and technicians to work on the productions. The six films directed by Newall at Twickenham for Real Art Productions began with Rodney Steps In (released in July 1931). Three other Real Art films directed by Newall were released in 1931, including Chin Chin Chinaman which was scripted by Newall and Brock Williams. Newall directed two more films at the Twickenham Film Studios, The Chinese Puzzle (released in March 1932) and The Admiral's Secret (released in February 1934).

Newall was in the cast of So Good! So Kind!!, a "flighty comedy" performed at London's Playhouse Theatre in October 1933. In February 1935 he played the lead role in the comedy All Rights Reserved at King's Theatre in Hammersmith.

Newall's last film-acting roles were Grand Finale (released in September 1936) and Merry Comes to Town, released two months after his death in February 1937.

Newall's health began to deteriorate in the mid-1930s. On 25 February 1937 Guy Newall died at his home at Hampstead, aged 51.

== Filmography ==
Actor

- The Heart of Sister Ann (December 1915), London Film Productions
- Esther (January 1916), London Film Productions
- Driven (January 1916), London Film Productions
- Money for Nothing (March 1916), London Film Productions
- Vice Versa (March 1916), London Film Productions
- Mother Love (March 1916), London Film Productions
- Trouble for Nothing (August 1916), London Film Productions
- The Manxman (November 1916), London Film Productions
- Smith (January 1917), London Film Productions
- Comradeship (January 1919), Stoll
- I Will (June 1919), Lucky Cat Films
- Fancy Dress (September 1919), Lucky Cat Films
- The Garden of Resurrection (December 1919), George Clark Productions
- The Lure of Crooning Water (January 1920), George Clark Productions
- Duke's Son (June 1920), George Clark Productions
- The Bigamist (August 1921), George Clark Productions
- Beauty and the Beast (January 1922), George Clark Productions
- The Persistent Lovers (April 1922), George Clark Productions
- Boy Woodburn (May 1922), George Clark Productions
- Fox Farm (July 1922), George Clark Productions
- A Maid of the Silver Sea (November 1922), George Clark Productions
- The Starlit Garden (July 1923), George Clark Productions
- What the Butler Saw (October 1924), Dewhurst Productions
- The Ghost Train (Der Geisterzug) (September 1927), Gainsborough Pictures
- Number 17 (Haus Nummer 17) (December 1928), Fellner & Somlo
- The Road to Fortune (August 1930), Starcraft
- The Eternal Feminine (February 1931), Starcraft
- Potiphar's Wife (March 1931), British International Pictures
- The Marriage Bond (March 1932), Real Art Productions
- Grand Finale (September 1936), British & Dominions Film Corporation
- Merry Comes to Town (May 1937), George King Productions

Director

- Testimony (September 1920), George Clark Productions
- The Bigamist (August 1921), George Clark Productions
- Beauty and the Beast (January 1922), George Clark Productions
- The Persistent Lovers (April 1922), George Clark Productions
- Boy Woodburn (May 1922), George Clark Productions
- Fox Farm (July 1922), George Clark Productions
- A Maid of the Silver Sea (November 1922), George Clark Productions
- The Starlit Garden (July 1923), George Clark Productions
- Rodney Steps In (July 1931), Real Art Productions
- The Rosary (July 1931), Twickenham Film Studios
- Chin Chin Chinaman (September 1931), Real Art Productions
- The Other Mrs. Phipps (December 1931), Real Art Productions
- The Chinese Puzzle (March 1932), Twickenham Film Studios
- The Admiral's Secret (February 1934), Real Art Productions

Screenwriter

- Money for Nothing (March 1916), London Film Productions
- Trouble for Nothing (August 1916), London Film Productions
- The March Hare (August 1919), Lucky Cat (with Frank Miller)
- The Garden of Resurrection (December 1919), George Clark Productions
- The Lure of Crooning Water (January 1920), George Clark Productions
- Duke's Son (June 1920), George Clark Productions
- Testimony (September 1920), George Clark Productions
- The Mirage (December 1920), George Clark Productions (with Ivy Duke)
- The Bigamist (August 1921), George Clark Productions
- Beauty and the Beast (January 1922), George Clark Productions
- The Persistent Lovers (April 1922), George Clark Productions
- Boy Woodburn (May 1922), George Clark Productions
- Fox Farm (July 1922), George Clark Productions
- A Maid of the Silver Sea (November 1922), George Clark Productions
- The Starlit Garden (July 1923), George Clark Productions
- Chin Chin Chinaman (September 1931), Real Art Productions

== Notes ==
A.Lieutenant-Colonel Marius Charles Newall (late of Bombay) retired in December 1884 (on a retired pay and extra annuity), with the honorary rank of Colonel. Colonel Newall died in 1906.

B.In an interview published in March 1920 Newall revealed that he breeds New Forest ponies.

C.After July 1923 only one further film was released under the name of George Clark Productions: Mutiny directed by F. Martin Thornton, released in January 1925. It was Thornton's final British film before he returned to the United States.

D.Dorothy Audrey Batley was born on 18 January 1902 at Marylebone, London, the daughter of Ernest and Ethyle Batley. Both her parents directed films in the period before World War I, often featuring Dorothy "as the plucky child heroine". Her mother died in April 1917 following an operation. Her father directed Dorothy in a four-reel farm drama The Sins of Youth in 1919, after which she continued as a stage actor. She made her theatrical debut in London at the Prince's Theatre in December 1920 as 'Ela Delahay' in Charley's Aunt. Batley toured as 'Odile' in The Rat and played the same part at the Prince of Wales's Theatre in June 1924. She continued in a series of theatrical roles in London theatres and touring companies during the period 1924 to early 1929.
