= The Double Life of Mr. Alfred Burton =

The Double Life of Mr. Alfred Burton may refer to:

- The Double Life of Mr. Alfred Burton (novel), a 1913 novel by E. Phillips Oppenheim
- The Double Life of Mr. Alfred Burton (film), a 1919 British silent comedy film, based on the novel
