= Rodney Steps In =

1931 film

- Feature story based on the film (Boy's Cinema, 24 October 1931)
- Directed by: Guy Newall
- Screenplay by: Brock Williams
- Produced by: Julius Hagen
- Starring: Richard Cooper; Elizabeth Allan; Walter Piers
- Production company: Twickenham Film Studios
- Release date: 14 December 1931
- Running time: 45 minutes
- Country: United Kingdom
- Language: English

Rodney Steps In is a 1931 British comedy film directed by Guy Newall and starring Richard Cooper, Elizabeth Allan, Walter Piers and Leo Sheffield. It was written by Brock Williams, and was made as a quota quickie at Twickenham Film Studios. A carefree aristocrat becomes involved with a woman suspected of murder – and assists her in proving her innocence.

== Preservation status ==
The British Film Institute National Archive holds a collection of stills but no film or video materials.

== Synopsis ==
Upper-class twit Rodney Perch sees what he thinks is a girl being attacked by a bag-snatcher, and goes to her assistance, soon to realise that she is in fact a thief, and the man was a detective. Falling for her, Rodney decides to become her partner in crime. The next night they meet to rob a safe, but are caught in the act.

== Cast ==
- Richard Cooper as Rodney Perch
- Elizabeth Allan as masked lady
- Walter Piers as Steven Dalton
- Leo Sheffield as Tapper
- Alexander Field as Billings
- John Turnbull as Inspector
- Melville Cooper

== Reception ==
Kine Weekly wrote: "A polished comedy crook drama, which has a slight but amusing story and one which furnishes an unexpected climax. The individual characterisation is good and the picture is well mounted. ... Richard Cooper plays Rodney, a silly ass part, with the necessary lightness and convicticn, and is mainly responsible for the comedy element. Elizabeth Allan is mysterious and intriguing as the girl, and there is a good cast in support."

Variety wrote: "As these quota quickies go this one is a little over average, which means to say it is possible to watch it through. ... Production and direction, all things considered, pretty average. Film gets by as satisfactory quota footage which should get laughs in the smaller bills, Richard Cooper as usual in his stammering ineptitude."
