= Comradeship =

Comradeship may refer to:

- Comradeship (1919 film), a British silent film drama directed by Maurice Elvey
- Kameradschaft, or Comradeship, a 1931 film directed by Georg Wilhelm Pabst

== See also ==
- Comrade
