= The Starlit Garden =

1923 film

- Directed by: Guy Newall
- Written by: Henry De Vere Stacpoole (novel); Guy Newall
- Produced by: George Clark
- Starring: Guy Newall; Ivy Duke; Valia Venitshaya; Lawford Davidson
- Production company: George Clark Productions
- Distributed by: Stoll Pictures
- Release date: July 1923
- Running time: 6,400 feet
- Country: United Kingdom
- Languages: Silent; English intertitles

The Starlit Garden is a 1923 British silent romantic film directed by Guy Newall and starring Newall, Ivy Duke, Lawford Davidson and Mary Rorke. The film is set in Italy and concerns a doomed romance between a ward and her guardian. It was made at Beaconsfield Studios.

== Cast ==
- Guy Newall as Richard Pinckney
- Ivy Duke as Phyllis Berknowles
- Valia Venitshaya as Frances Blett
- A. Bromley Davenport as Colonel Grangerson
- Lawford Davidson as Silas Grangerson
- Mary Rorke as Aunt Maria
- Cecil Morton York as Hennessey
- John Alexander as Rafferty
- Marie Ault as Old Prue

== Bibliography ==
- Low, Rachael. History of the British Film, 1918-1929. George Allen & Unwin, 1971.
- Warren, Patricia. British Film Studios: An Illustrated History. Batsford, 2001.
