= The Bigamist =

The Bigamist may refer to:

- The Bigamist, an 1887 play by Fergus Hume
- The Bigamist (1921 film), a silent British film directed by Guy Newall
- The Bigamist (1953 film), starring Edmond O'Brien, Joan Fontaine and Ida Lupino, who also directed
- The Bigamist (1956 film), an Italian film featuring Marcello Mastroianni
