= Duke's Son =

1920 British film by Franklin Dyall

- Directed by: Franklin Dyall
- Written by: Cosmo Hamilton (novel); Guy Newall
- Produced by: George Clark
- Starring: Guy Newall; Ivy Duke; Hugh Buckler
- Production company: George Clark Productions
- Distributed by: Stoll Pictures
- Release date: June 1920
- Country: United Kingdom
- Languages: Silent; English intertitles

Duke's Son is a 1920 British silent drama film directed by Franklin Dyall and starring Guy Newall, Ivy Duke and Hugh Buckler.

== Cast ==
- Guy Newall as Lord Francis Delamere
- Ivy Duke as Loan Lambourne
- Hugh Buckler as Sir Robert Sheen
- Lawford Davidson as Charles Denbeigh-Smith
- Ruth Mackay as Mrs. Denbeigh-Smith
- Edward O'Neill as Duke of Cheshire
- Mary Merrall as Billy Honour
- Philip Hewland as Lord Tarporley
- Toni Edgar-Bruce as Mary Delamare
- Douglas Munro as Burberry
- Winifred Sadler as Mrs. Burberry

== Bibliography ==
- Goble, Alan. The Complete Index to Literary Sources in Film. Walter de Gruyter, 1999.
- Low, Rachael. The History of the British Film 1918-1929. George Allen & Unwin, 1971.
