= The Garden of Resurrection =

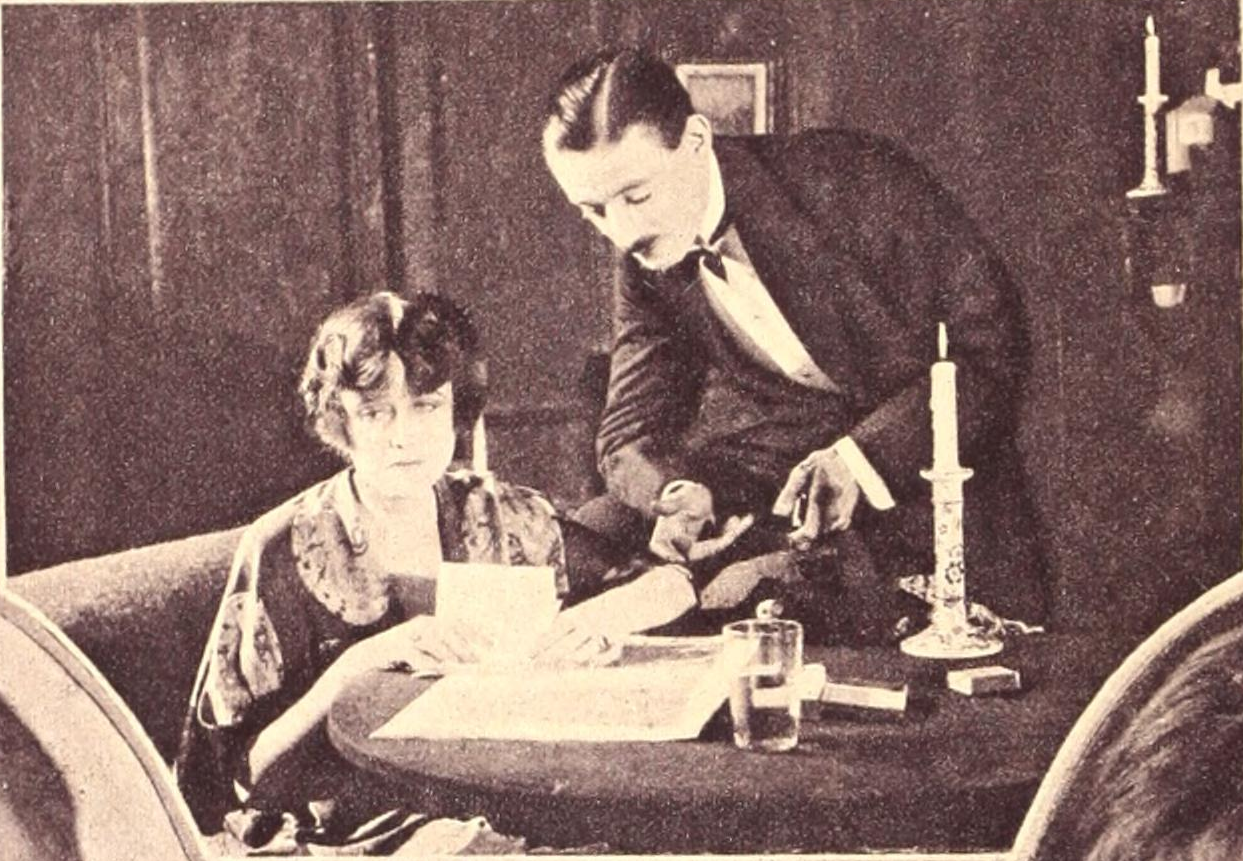
- Directed by: Arthur Rooke
- Written by: Guy Newall; E. Temple Thurston
- Cinematography: Joe Rosenthal
- Production company: George Clark Productions
- Distributed by: Stoll Pictures
- Release date: December 1919
- Running time: 7 reels
- Country: United Kingdom
- Language: Silent (English intertitles)

The Garden of Resurrection is a 1919 British silent drama film directed by Arthur Rooke and starring Guy Newall, Ivy Duke and Franklin Dyall. It was adapted from the 1911 novel The Garden of Resurrection by E. Temple Thurston.

== Plot ==
According to a film magazine, "Clarissa, a beautiful and wealthy half-caste, is brought to England by her mercenary lover, Fennell, who lodges her with his aunts in an Irish seaside village. Here she is found by Bellairs, a lonely young bachelor, whose curiosity, aroused by Fennell's cynical story of her history overheard at a restaurant, quickly changes to love, which is not, however, reciprocated. To get hold of Carissa's money Fennell induces her to go through a mock marriage with him, but soon afterwards heartlessly deserts her. In her trouble Clarissa turns to Bellairs, who is on the point of committing suicide through disappontment at losing her, and who shields her when she bears a still-born child. Later, through the instrumentality of his good friend, Cruikshank, Bellairs finds happiness in a marriage with Clarissa."

== Cast ==
- Guy Newall as Bellairs
- Ivy Duke as Clarissa
- Franklin Dyall as Cruickshank
- Mary Dibley as Belwottle
- Douglas Munro as Moxon
- Lawford Davidson as Fennell
- Hugh Buckler as Dr. Perowne
- Humberston Wright as General French
- Madge Tree as Aunt
