= The Double Life of Mr. Alfred Burton (novel) =

1913 fictional novel

- First US edition
- Author: E. Phillips Oppenheim
- Language: English
- Genre: Drama
- Publisher: Methuen (UK); Little, Brown (US)
- Publication date: 1913
- Publication place: United Kingdom
- Media type: Print

The Double Life of Mr. Alfred Burton is a 1913 novel by the British writer E. Phillips Oppenheim.

== Adaption ==
In 1919 it was adapted into a British film of the same title directed by Arthur Rooke and starring Kenelm Foss and Ivy Duke.

== Bibliography ==
- Goble, Alan. The Complete Index to Literary Sources in Film. Walter de Gruyter, 199
