= Money for Nothing (disambiguation) =

"Money for Nothing" is a 1985 song by British rock band Dire Straits.

Money for Nothing may also refer to:

== Books ==
- Money for Nothing (novel), a 1928 novel by P. G. Wodehouse

== Film ==
- Money for Nothing (1916 film), a film starring Guy Newall
- Money for Nothing (1932 film), a British film
- Money for Nothing (1993 film), a film starring John Cusack
- Money for Nothing, a 1993 TV film by Mike Ockrent
- Money for Nothing: Inside the Federal Reserve, 2013 film

== Television ==
- Money for Nothing (TV programme), a 2015 British television programme narrated by Arthur Smith that airs on BBC One
- "Money for Nothing" (CSI: Miami), an episode of the TV series CSI: Miami

== Music ==
- "Money for Nothing/Beverly Hillbillies*", a parody cover of the Dire Straits song by "Weird Al" Yankovic
- Money for Nothing (album), a greatest hits collection by Dire Straits
- "Money for Nothing" (Darin song)

== See also ==
- Monkeys for Nothin' and the Chimps for Free, a 2007 album by Reel Big Fish
- Money for Nothing, a BBC Radio Wales show presented by Welsh musician, comedian and actor Owen Money
