= The Place of Honour =

1921 film

- Directed by: Sinclair Hill
- Written by: Ethel M. Dell (short story); William J. Elliott
- Starring: Hugh Buckler; Madge White; Miles Mander
- Production company: Stoll Pictures
- Distributed by: Stoll Pictures
- Release date: June 1921
- Country: United Kingdom
- Languages: Silent; English intertitles

The Place of Honour is a 1921 British silent adventure film directed by Sinclair Hill and starring Hugh Buckler, Madge White and Miles Mander. It is based on a short story by Ethel M. Dell set in British India.

== Cast ==
- Hugh Buckler as Maj. Eustace Tudor
- Madge White as Mrs. Tudor
- Pardoe Woodman as Lt. Philip Trevor
- Miles Mander as Lt. Devereaux
- M. Gray Murray as Capt. Raleigh
- Ruth Mackay as Mrs. Raleigh
- Bob Vallis as Pvt. Archie Smith

== Bibliography ==
- Low, Rachael. History of the British Film, 1918-1929. George Allen & Unwin, 1971.
