= A. Bromley Davenport =

English actor (1867–1946)

Davenport (centre) & Will Fyffe in Owd Bob (1938)

Arthur Henry Bromley-Davenport (29 October 1867 – 15 December 1946), better known as A. Bromley Davenport, was an English actor born in Baginton, Warwickshire, England, UK.

Bromley-Davenport made appearances in at least 77 films for television and cinema between 1920 and 1944. He was known publicly as Bromley Davenport and in the film credits, his Christian name was always abbreviated.

Perhaps the most commercial films he appeared in were Jamaica Inn and The Way Ahead, in which his character was named after his real life name. He did not often have a lead role, but in the television drama Magic, he took the lead role as Duke.

== Personal life ==
Bromley Davenport was a member of the Bromley-Davenport family of Macclesfield, Cheshire. He was the youngest son of the politician William Bromley-Davenport and the brother of William Bromley-Davenport, a British Army officer, England footballer, and Conservative politician.

He was educated at Eton College, Berkshire. In 1886, he married Elizabeth Light. In 1921, he married Madame Adele Burdillat of Nice, France. He was 79 when he died in London in 1946.

== Filmography ==
- The Great Gay Road (1920) - Sir Crispin Vickrey
- The Bigamist (1921) - Richard Carruthers
- The Persistent Lovers (1922) - Duke of Harborough
- Boy Woodburn (1922) - Matt Woodburn
- Fox Farm (1922) - Sam Wetherall
- Running Water (1922) - Capt. Barstow
- A Maid of the Silver Sea (1922) - Old Tom Hamon
- The Starlit Garden (1923) - Col Grangerson
- Bonnie Prince Charlie (1923) - Sir John Cope
- Sally Bishop (1924) - Landlord
- Eugene Aram (1924) - Cpl. Bunting
- What the Butler Saw (1924) - General Dunlop
- Somebody's Darling (1925) - Sleeper
- Roses of Picardy (1927) - Baron d'Archeville
- The Glad Eye (1927) - Galipau
- The Fake (1927) - Hesketh Pointer
- A Sister to Assist 'Er (1927) - Jim Harris
- The Flight Commander (1927) - Philosopher
- Glorious Youth (1928) - Sam Duffield
- The Blue Peter (1928) - Mr. Callaghan
- Spangles (1928) - Romanovitch
- The American Prisoner (1929) - Squire Malherb
- Too Many Crooks (1930, Short) - The Man Upstairs
- Leave It to Me (1930, Short) - Mr. Jordan
- Captivation (1931) - Colonel Jordan
- Glamour (1931) - Lord Belton
- Mischief (1931)
- The Marriage Bond (1932) - MFH
- Self Made Lady (1932) - Duke of Alchester
- Mr. Bill the Conqueror (1932) - Lord Blagden
- Flat No. 9 (1932, Short) - Caretaker
- When London Sleeps (1932) - Colonel Graham
- The Return of Raffles (1932) - Sir John Truwode
- Money Means Nothing (1932) - Earl of Massingham
- The Face at the Window (1932) - Gaston de Brisson
- Lord Camber's Ladies (1932) - Sir Bedford Slufter
- The Iron Stair (1933) - Sir Andrew Gale
- The Wishbone (1933) - Harry Stammer
- The Melody-Maker (1933) - Jenks
- Dora (1933, Short) - Judge
- Enemy of the Police (1933) - Sir Lemuel Tapleigh
- A Shot in the Dark (1933) - Peter Browne
- The Pointing Finger (1933) - Lord Edensore
- The Stolen Necklace (1933) - Priest
- Little Miss Nobody (1933) - Mr. Romary
- Lily of Killarney (1934) - Lord Kenmore (uncredited)
- The Warren Case (1934) - Sir Richard Clavering
- Love, Life and Laughter (1934) - Menkenburg
- Lost in the Legion (1934) - Colonel
- The Scarley Pimpernel (1934)- French innkeeper (Brogard)
- So You Won't Talk (1935) - Mr. Fielding
- Vintage Wine (1935) - Pierre
- The Crouching Beast (1935)
- The Cardinal (1936) - Bramante
- London Melody (1937) - General Taplow
- Owd Bob (1938) - Magistrate - Mr. Parker
- Murder in the Family (1938) - Minor Role (uncredited)
- Second Thoughts (1938) - George Gaunt
- Jamaica Inn (1939) - Ringwood
- Magic (1939, TV Movie) - The Duke
- The Mysterious Mr. Davis (1939) - Lord Avonmouth
- The Second Mr. Bush (1940) - Colonel Barlow
- The Farmer's Wife (1941) - Henry Coaker
- Love on the Dole (1941) - Pawnbroker (uncredited)
- Old Mother Riley's Ghosts (1941) - Warrender
- Let the People Sing (1942) - Agent
- The Young Mr. Pitt (1942) - Sir Evan Nepean
- Those Kids from Town (1942) - Egworth
- When We Are Married (1943) - Mayor
- The Way Ahead (1944) - Chelsea Pensioner (final film role)
