= Fox Farm (novel) =

1911 novel by Warwick Deeping

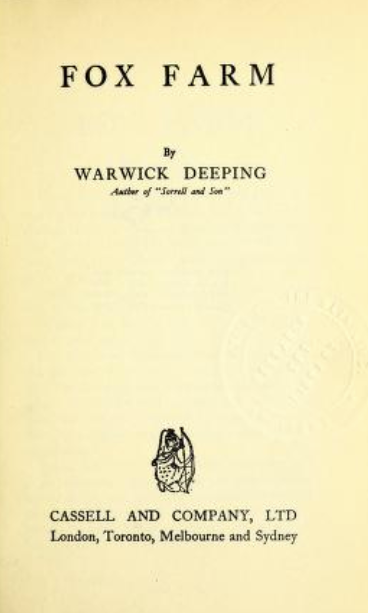
- Title page for Fox Farm (1911)
- Author: Warwick Deeping
- Language: English
- Publication date: 1911
- Publication place: United Kingdom
- Media type: Print

Fox Farm is a novel by the British writer Warwick Deeping which was first published in 1911. It was one of Deeping's most successful works in the period before his major international breakthrough with Sorrell and Son. In 1922 it was adapted into a silent film of the same title directed by and starring Guy Newall.

== Bibliography ==
- Mary Grover. The Ordeal of Warwick Deeping: Middlebrow Authorship and Cultural Embarrassment. Associated University Presse, 2009.
