= Comradeship (1919 film) =

1919 British film by Maurice Elvey

- Directed by: Maurice Elvey
- Written by: Jeffrey Bernerd; Louis N. Parker
- Produced by: Maurice Elvey
- Starring: Lily Elsie; Gerald Ames; Guy Newall
- Cinematography: Paul Burger
- Production company: Stoll Pictures
- Release date: January 1919
- Running time: 6000 feet
- Country: United Kingdom
- Language: English

Comradeship is a 1919 British silent film drama, directed by Maurice Elvey and starring Lily Elsie, Gerald Ames and Guy Newall. The film's action covers the entire span of World War I, from the months before the outbreak of hostilities to the declaration of peace.

== Background ==
Comradeship was the first feature production by the Stoll Pictures, founded in April 1918 by theatrical manager Oswald Stoll. Stoll was a well-known philanthropist who had been instrumental during World War I in setting up a charity to create homes for disabled soldiers, and campaigned to publicise the plight of blinded ex-servicemen. The film's storyline mirrored these interests, and was also one of the first to examine the social impact of the war on Britain in the respect that common cause and experience had caused a sea-change in British society, challenging and eroding traditional class-based assumptions.

Filming on Comradeship began in the summer of 1918 while the war was still in progress, and it was still in production when the Armistice was signed in November. Elvey took the opportunity to incorporate authentic footage of victory celebrations in London and some of his characters in the setting of the city in the immediate aftermath of war, lending these sections of the film a historical documentary feel.

== Plot ==
Pacifist John Armstrong runs a drapery store in the small town of Melcombe, helped by his apprentice Peggy and German assistant Otto, who are having an affair. Local landowner Lieutenant Baring finds Otto a suspicious character, but is angrily assured by John that he is trustworthy. Armstrong is attracted to Baring's cousin Betty), who plans to turn their home, Fanshawe Hall, into a wounded soldiers' hospital on the inevitable outbreak of war between Britain and Germany.

Otto leaves John a note stating his allegiance to Germany, and fails to return to work after the 1914 August bank holiday. Peggy is distraught as she is carrying his child. She is disowned by her family, but Betty hears of the situation and offers shelter to Peggy at Fanshawe.

War breaks out, and injured serviceman start to arrive at Fanshawe. John visits to offer a charitable donation, and starts to tell Betty how he feels about her, but is deflated when Betty explains that running the hospital takes up all of her time and she cannot think of romance. Despite his pacifist inclinations, John finally enlists in the army. At the training camp he becomes fast friends with the cheery working-class Ginger (Teddy Arundell) and the pair admit their trepidation to each other. As the regiment leaves for the front, Betty turns up to wish John goodbye and good luck, and they embrace.

While John fights in the trenches, Peggy suffers a miscarriage. She decides to become a nurse and help Betty at Fanshawe. John comes home on leave and is upset to see Betty handing her locket to Baring as a keepsake. Ginger arrives in Melcombe to visit. As he is out walking, he sees Peggy being harassed by a man and steps in to rescue her. They begin to fall in love, but before Peggy can be honest with Ginger about her past, Ginger and John are recalled to action.

On the battlefield Baring is attacked by Otto, who is killed by Ginger. Ginger is shocked when he finds a picture of Peggy in Otto's pocket. John is moving the badly-wounded Baring to safety when he finds Betty's locket. For a moment he considers leaving Baring to die, but comes to his senses and continues dragging Baring to shelter. A shell explodes nearby, and John is blinded. He is repatriated and sent to Fanshawe to be nursed.

The Armistice is signed. Ginger visits Melcombe again, but refuses to have anything to do with Peggy. Baring reveals that Betty gave him her locket for him to pass on to John, but for one reason or another he forgot about it. John now realises that Betty does not love Baring, but refuses to advance his own suit as he does not want her to feel she has to commit herself to a blind man out of sympathy. Betty is hurt by John's apparent lack of interest. Peggy intercedes, telling John he must be honest with Betty about his love for her. He refuses, but manages to effect a happy reconciliation between Peggy and Ginger.

As society begins to recover from the war, John feels adrift and unsure what to do with his future. He learns of a network of Comrades Clubs set up by ex-serviceman, and finds purpose by setting up a branch in Melcombe. Ginger and Peggy have married, and come down for the grand opening of the club. On the big day, Betty decides that if John will not make the running, she will ask him to marry her. He agrees, and later receives the good news that he can have an operation which will restore his sight.

== Cast ==
- Lily Elsie as Betty Mortimer
- Gerald Ames as John Armstrong
- Guy Newall as Lt. Baring
- Teddy Arundell as Ginger
- Peggy Carlisle as Peggy
- Dallas Cairns as Liebeman
- Kate Gurney as Housekeeper
