= A Maid of the Silver Sea (film) =

1922 film

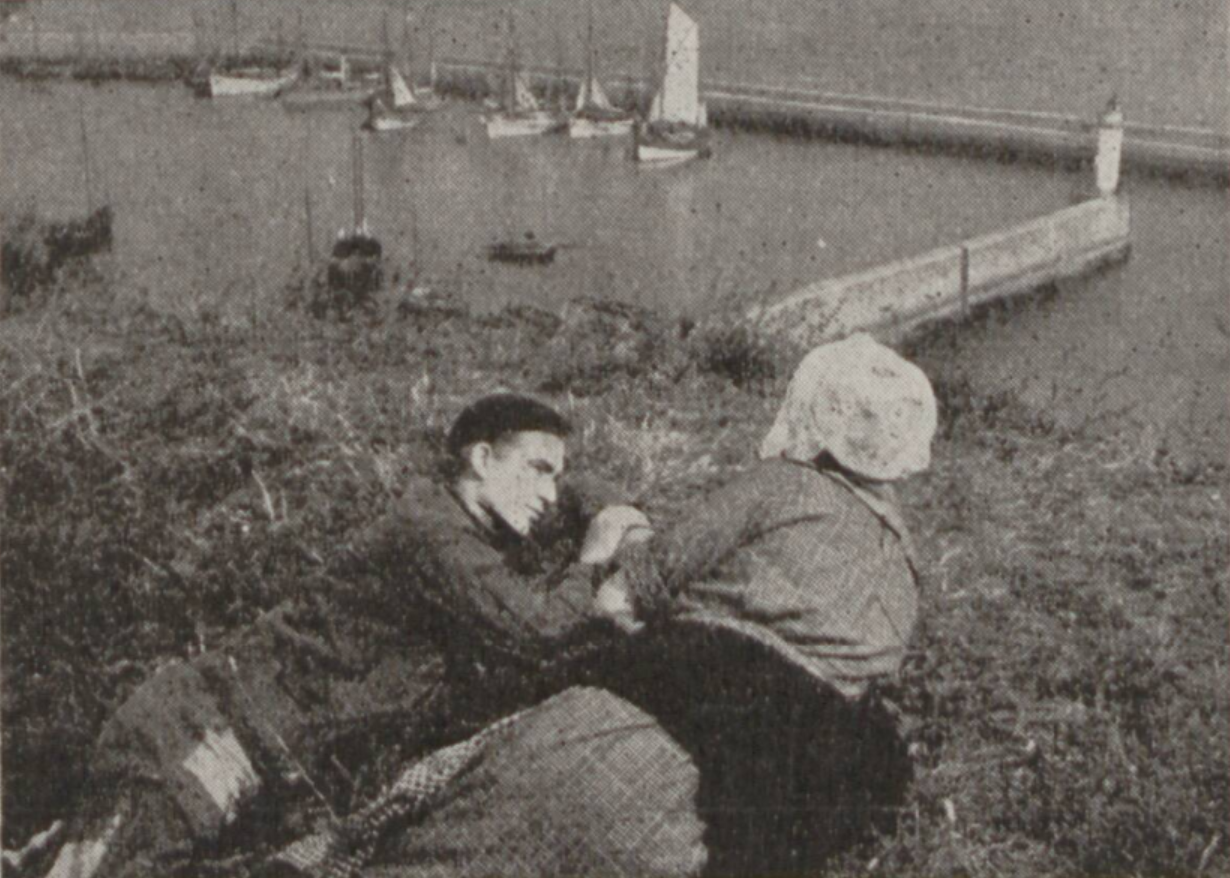
- Directed by: Guy Newall
- Written by: John Oxenham (novel); Guy Newall
- Produced by: George Clark
- Starring: Guy Newall; Ivy Duke; Cameron Carr
- Production company: George Clark Productions
- Distributed by: Stoll Pictures
- Release date: November 1922
- Country: United Kingdom
- Languages: Silent; English intertitles

A Maid of the Silver Sea is a 1922 British silent crime-drama film directed by Guy Newall and starring Newall, Ivy Duke and Cameron Carr. It is an adaptation of the 1910 novel of the same name by John Oxenham.

== Plot ==
The Bioscope provided the following synopsis of the film:

To a small island off the French coast comes Stephen Gard, a young Englishman, in charge of a gang of Cornish miners, whose presence arouses the hostility of the natives. Especially resentful is Tom Hamon, the bullying brother of Nance, in whom Stephen finds a friend. immediately after a fight one night with Stephen, Tom is found dead at the foot of a steep cliff. Although his assertion of innocence is accepted by the local magistrate, the fisher-folk, goaded on by the dead man's wife, believe that Stephen murdered Tom and threaten to lynch him. Hearing of their intentions, Nance rows Stephen to a lonely rock whither she brings him food. The angry fisher-folk discover Stephen's hiding-place, however, and, landing on the island, blockade his cavern. Meanwhile, another fisherman is killed on the spot where Tom died. Determined to solve the mystery, Nance visits the place with the magistrate and discovers that both men were killed by the kick of a wild pony, which attacks her. Hastening to Stephen's island, she is able to prove his innocence and secure his release.

== Cast ==
- Ivy Duke as Nance Hamon
- Guy Newall as Stephen Gard
- A. Bromley Davenport as Old Tom Hamon
- Cameron Carr as Tom Hamon
- Lilian Cavanagh as Julie
- Charles Evemy as Berne Hamon
- Winifred Sadler as Mrs. Hamon
- Percy Morrish as Peter Mauger
- Marie Gerald as Grannie
- Charles Wood as Seneschal
- Norman Loring as Doctor

== Reception ==
According to The Biograph, "charming rocky coast scenes and clever Breton type studies are the most noteworthy features of this version of John Oxenham's novel, adapted and directed by Guy Newall. The story opens well, but tails off rather weakly. However, the production is varied in interest and, as a whole, makes a fairly satisfactory entertainment of a class which is always welcome." According to the reviewer, "Guy Newall's direction of individual scenes is always intelligent and artistic, and often original. The photography by Hal Young is generally excellent, especially in the coast scenes, a few of which are real gems of screen art," and the acting good, but "the solution of the 'murder' mystery is in the nature of an anti-climax, owing largely to the unconvincing and altogether inadequate staging of the wild pony's attack upon the heroine."

== Bibliography ==
- Goble, Alan. The Complete Index to Literary Sources in Film. Walter de Gruyter, 1999.
- Low, Rachael. The History of the British Film 1918-1929. George Allen & Unwin, 1971.
