= The Double Life of Mr. Alfred Burton (film) =

1919 British film by Arthur Rooke

- Directed by: Arthur Rooke
- Written by: Kenelm Foss
- Based on: The Double Life of Mr. Alfred Burton by E. Phillips Oppenheim
- Produced by: George Clark
- Starring: Kenelm Foss; Ivy Duke; James Lindsay (actor)
- Production company: Lucky Cat Productions
- Distributed by: Ideal Films
- Release date: July 1919
- Country: United States
- Languages: Silent; English intertitles

The Double Life of Mr. Alfred Burton is a 1919 British silent comedy film directed by Arthur Rooke and starring Kenelm Foss, Ivy Duke and James Lindsay. It was based on the 1913 novel The Double Life of Mr. Alfred Burton by Edward Phillips Oppenheim.

== Cast ==
- Kenelm Foss as Alfred Burton
- Ivy Duke as Edith Cowper
- Elaine Madison as Mrs. Burton
- Joe Peterman as Mr. Waddington
- James Lindsay as Mr.Bomford
- Philip Hewland as Lord Idlemay
- Humberston Wright as Kamar Shri
- Ronald Power as Cowper
- Gordon Craig as Alfie Burton
