= Boy Woodburn =

1922 film by Guy Newall

- Directed by: Guy Newall
- Written by: Alfred Ollivant (novel); Alex Scruby; Guy Newall
- Produced by: George Clark
- Starring: Guy Newall; Ivy Duke; Mary Rorke; A. Bromley Davenport
- Cinematography: H. Harris
- Production company: George Clark Productions
- Distributed by: Stoll Pictures
- Release date: July 1922
- Running time: 5 reels
- Country: United Kingdom
- Languages: Silent; English intertitles

Boy Woodburn is a 1922 British silent sports film directed by Guy Newall and starring Newall, Ivy Duke and Mary Rorke. It is set in the world of English horse racing. It was known in the United States by the alternative title Wings of the Turf. It was based on the 1917 novel Boy Woodburn by Alfred Ollivant.

== Cast ==
- Guy Newall as Jim Silver
- Ivy Duke as Boy Woodburn
- Mary Rorke as Ma Woodburn
- A. Bromley Davenport as Matt Woodburn
- Cameron Carr as Jaggers
- John Alexander as Monkey Brand

== See also ==
- List of films about horses
- List of films about horse racing

== Bibliography ==
- Bamford, Kentom. Distorted Images: British National Identity and Film in the 1920s. I.B. Tauris, 1999.
- Low, Rachael. History of the British Film, 1918-1929. George Allen & Unwin, 1971.
