= Leon M. Lion =

British actor (1879–1947)

- Photo by Howard Coster
- Born: Leon Marks Lion; 12 March 1879; Islington, London, England
- Died: 28 March 1947 (aged 68); Brighton, Sussex, England
- Occupations: Actor; Playwright; Stage director Theatrical producer
- Spouse: Kathleen Crighton Symington (m. 1907; div. 1925)

Leon Marks Lion (12 March 1879 – 28 March 1947) was an English stage and film actor, playwright, theatrical director and producer. He starred in Joseph Jefferson Farjeon's 1925 hit play Number 17 as well as its subsequent 1932 film adaptation by Alfred Hitchcock.

== Selected filmography ==
- The Woman Who Was Nothing (1915)
- Hard Times (1915)
- The Chinese Puzzle (1919)
- Chin Chin Chinaman (1932)
- Number Seventeen (1932)
- The Chinese Puzzle (1932)
- The Amazing Quest of Ernest Bliss (1936)
- Strange Boarders (1938)
- Crackerjack (1938)
