= Derelicts (film) =

1917 British film by Sidney Morgan

- Directed by: Sidney Morgan
- Written by: Sidney Morgan
- Based on: Derelicts by William John Locke
- Starring: Violet Graham; Sydney Vautier; Julian Royce
- Production company: Unity-Super Films
- Distributed by: Olympic Films
- Release date: March 1917
- Country: United Kingdom
- Languages: Silent; English intertitles

Derelicts is a 1917 British silent drama film directed by Sidney Morgan and starring Violet Graham, Sydney Vautier and Julian Royce.

== Cast ==
- Violet Graham as Yvonne Latour
- Sydney Vautier as Stephen Chisely
- Julian Royce as Canon Chiseley
- Mona K. Harrison as Annie Bevan
- F. Yensen as Amedee Bazauge

== Bibliography ==
- Goble, Alan. The Complete Index to Literary Sources in Film. Walter de Gruyter, 1999.
- Low, Rachael. The History of the British Film 1914 - 1918. George Allen & Unwin, 1950.
