= The Bigamist (1921 film) =

1921 British film by Guy Newall

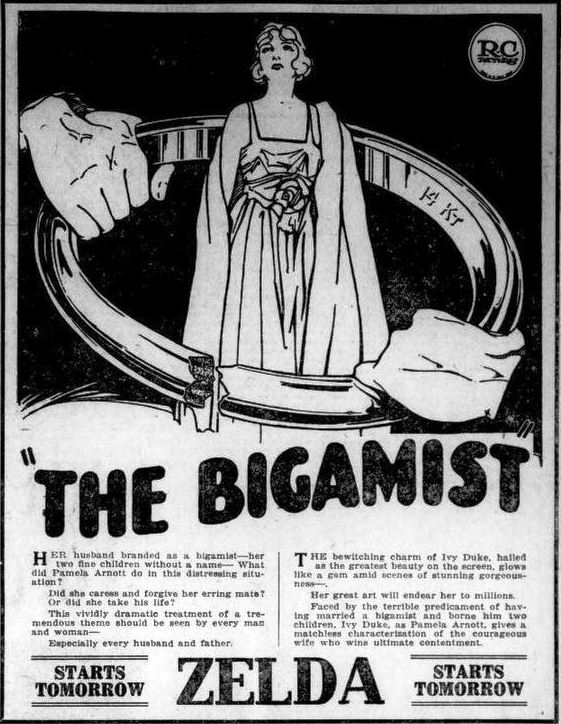
- American newspaper ad
- Directed by: Guy Newall
- Written by: F. E. Mills Young (novel); Guy Newall
- Produced by: George Clark
- Starring: Guy Newall; Ivy Duke; Julian Royce; Barbara Everest
- Production company: George Clark Productions
- Distributed by: Stoll Pictures
- Release date: August 1921
- Running time: 9,000 feet
- Country: United Kingdom
- Language: Silent (English intertitles)
- Budget: £51,000

The Bigamist is a 1921 British silent romance film directed by Guy Newall and starring Newall, Ivy Duke, and Julian Royce.

== Plot ==
As described in a film magazine, Pamela (Duke) and Herbert Arnott (Royce) have been happily married for five years and have had two children. On the day of their wedding anniversary, Pamela receives a letter from another woman signed Lucy Arnott which states that she is the legal wife of Herbert. Herbert confirms that this is the truth and explains that Lucy refused to give him a divorce. For the sake of their children, Pamela continues to live with Herbert, but their governess Blanche (Everest) later overhears a conversation between them and learns the truth regarding the status of the marriage. Pamela discharges Blanche, and on the day the governess leaves Herbert also departs. Pamela calls on family friend George Dane for advice. George agrees to search for Herbert, and by tracing the governess locates Herbert in a hospital. He is ill but has a message disclosing that Lucy Arnott has died. Pamela and Herbert are then remarried by the hospital priest. There is also a subplot about the Carruthers, another couple who are friends of the Arnotts, where Constance Carruthers (Scott) desires to have babies but her husband Richard (Davenport) is more interested in golf.

== Cast ==
- Guy Newall as George Dane
- Ivy Duke as Pamela Arnott
- Julian Royce as Herbert Arnott
- Barbara Everest as Blanche Maitland
- A. Bromley as Richard Carruthers
- Dorothy Scott as Constance Carruthers
- Douglas Munro as Proprietor

== Bibliography ==
- Bamford, Kentom. Distorted Images: British National Identity and Film in the 1920s. I.B. Tauris, 1999.
- Low, Rachael. History of the British Film, 1918-1929. George Allen & Unwin, 1971.
