= Chin Chin Chinaman =

1931 British film by Guy Newall

- Theatrical release poster
- Directed by: Guy Newall
- Written by: Guy Newall; Brock Williams
- Produced by: Julius Hagen
- Starring: Elizabeth Allan; Leon M. Lion; George Curzon
- Cinematography: Basil Emmott
- Edited by: Jack Harris
- Production company: Real Art Productions
- Distributed by: Metro-Goldwyn-Mayer
- Release date: November 1931
- Running time: 57 minutes
- Country: United Kingdom
- Language: English

Chin Chin Chinaman (U.S. title: The Boat from Shanghai) is a 1931 British crime film directed by Guy Newall and starring Elizabeth Allan, Leon M. Lion and George Curzon. It was written by Newall and Brock Williams.

== Cast ==
- Elizabeth Allan as Countess Olga Dureska
- Leon M. Lion as the Mandarin
- George Curzon as Colley
- Picot Schooling as Marie
- Dino Galvani as Dolange
- Douglas Blandford as Captain
- Henry B. Longhurst as Purser
- Ley On as Chinese servant

== Production ==
The film was made at Twickenham Studios as a quota quickie for release by MGM. The film's sets were designed by the art director James A. Carter.

== Reception ==
The Daily Film Renter wrote: "This decidedly original British production, a more than useful Quota booking for any hall, deserves a better title; otherwise, despite some slight crudities in detail, it calls for praise on most counts. Guy Newall has put over an essentially theatrical but very effective mystery story with a light directorial touch, and an exploitation of picturesque peculiarities of race and diction which make it a really intriguing entertainment. ... Leon M. Lion's portrayal of the sauve Chinaman, and the cleverly maintained mystery of the various characters, are the outstanding features of an unassuming but really fresh effort."

Kine Weekly wrote: "The plot is unoriginal, but it works out satisfactorily, and has a novel twist. ... Leon M. Lion makes up quite well as the Chinaman. Elizabeth Allen is sufficiently alluring and mystifying as the Countess, while George Curzon is good as the polished crook. There is nothing remarkable about Guy Newall's direction; but he keeps things on the move, and succeeds in condensing pleasant dramatic diversion into a small compass."
