= Franklin Dyall =

English actor (1870–1950)

- Dyall as Emilio Diaz in Sacred and Profane Love (1920)
- Born: 3 February 1870; Liverpool, Lancashire, England
- Died: 8 May 1950 (aged 80); Worthing, Sussex, England
- Occupation: Actor
- Spouse(s): Mary Phyllis Logan (1907–1929; divorced); Mary Merrall (1929–1950; his death)
- Children: Valentine Dyall

Frank Poole Dyall (3 February 1870 (Note: In adult life Dyall deducted four years from his age, giving his year of birth as 1874 in Who's Who in the Theatre, but the actual year is recorded in the England & Wales, Civil Registration Birth Index.)– 8 May 1950), professionally known as Franklin Dyall, was an English actor. In his early years he was a member of the companies of the actor-managers George Alexander, Ben Greet, John Martin-Harvey and Johnston Forbes-Robertson. During a 50-year stage career he played a wide range of parts in plays from Shakespeare to modern comedy, grand guignol, swashbuckling costume drama and the works of Ibsen. He broadcast on radio and television and made more than 20 films. He was the father of the actor Valentine Dyall.

== Life and career ==
=== Early years ===
Dyall was born in Liverpool on 3 February 1870, the youngest of four sons of Charles Dyall, first curator of the Walker Art Gallery, and his wife Margaret Oliphant née Robertson. He was educated at the Liverpool Institute High School for Boys. He made his professional stage debut in April 1894 in George Alexander's company at the St James's Theatre, London, in The Masqueraders by Henry Arthur Jones. In his early career he appeared under his real name, and as Frank Dyall he played a servant in Alexander's production of Henry James's Guy Domville in January 1895 and created the role of Merriman in The Importance of Being Earnest the following month.

Dyall's first Shakespearean roles were Claudius in Hamlet, and the Duke in The Merchant of Venice in Ben Greet's company at the Olympic Theatre in May 1897. Claudius was a role to which he returned during his career, playing it to the Hamlet of John Martin-Harvey in 1911 and John Gielgud in 1935. He joined Johnston Forbes-Robertson at the Lyceum later in that year, playing Guildenstern in Hamlet and Second Witch in Macbeth the following year ("satisfactory, though we should prefer female witches", said The Era). He appeared at the Prince of Wales’s Theatre in June 1898 as the Doctor in Mrs Patrick Campbell's production of Pelléas and Mélisande.

=== Early 20th century ===
In the early years of the 20th century Dyall appeared in Lewis Waller's company, and played a variety of roles, both Shakespearean and modern. In 1905–06 he toured the US in E. S. Willard's company. After returning to England, he married the actress Mary Phyllis Logan, known professionally as Concordia Merrel. They had one child, Valentine, who followed his parents into the acting profession. At about the same time Dyall changed his stage name from Frank Dyall to Franklin Dyall, (Note: The change was gradual: he was billed variously as Frank or Franklin as late as 1918.) He acted in a wide range of roles, including several Ibsen parts, playing the title role in John Gabriel Borkman (1910), Dr Rank in A Doll's House and Judge Brack in Hedda Gabler (both 1911). Of the first of these the reviewer of The Illustrated London News called Dyall's performance "splendid ... the actor has done nothing half so good heretofore and his was ... the best performance we have ever had in London of his role". In 1913, he originated the role of the Stranger/Conjurer, in G.K. Chesterton's first play, Magic.

In 1914 Dyall returned to North America, touring Canada and the US with Marie Tempest's company, playing roles including Richard Whichello in Mary Goes First and James Crane in At the Barn. The New York Tribune found his performances "easy, natural and enjoyable". He remained in the US in early 1915, playing the paterfamilias in a new comedy, The Younger Generation, by Stanley Houghton. After returning to London he appeared with Martin-Harvey at His Majesty's in 1916, as Laertes in Hamlet, Lucentio in The Taming of the Shrew, Richmond in Richard III, and the Duke of Exeter in Henry V. In 1918, in partnership with the actress Mary Merrall, he ran the Abbey Theatre, Dublin, for the summer season.

=== Inter-war years ===
In his middle years Dyall had many successes playing what The Times called "saturnine villains in modern melodramas":

In this genre his most notable achievements were in White Cargo, which was produced in May 1924, at the Playhouse, and ran for a year and a half, and in a series of Edgar Wallace crime pieces, beginning with The Ringer, which ran for 12 months at Wyndham's in 1926, and was followed by others over several years.

Between 1918 and 1939 Dyall played five Shakespearean roles: Friar Lawrence in Romeo and Juliet (1919), Pistol in Henry V, Cassius in Julius Caesar, Shylock in The Merchant of Venice (all 1934), and Claudius with Gielgud (1935). Between these his appearances ranged from grand guignol (1922), to another Ibsen lead (Solness in The Master Builder (1931) as well as swashbuckling roles such as Duke Michael in The Prisoner of Zenda and Captain Hook in Peter Pan (both 1923). In 1928 he and his first wife were divorced, and the following year he married Mary Merrall, with whom he had been living for several years.

=== Last years ===
At the Shaftesbury Theatre in 1940 Dyall played Andrew Bevan in Behind the Scenes. The following year he played Sir Valentine in The Devil's Sanctuary, and for ENSA he toured for five months as Weston in White Cargo. He toured in 1943, in The Strange Case of Margaret Wishart, and was back in the West End later that year as Vasin in The Russians at the Playhouse, and, in the Christmas season, the Caterpillar and the King of Hearts in Alice in Wonderland at the Scala. His final stage appearances were on tour in 1944 and 1945, in The Case of the Frightened Lady, The Frog, and The Ringer, and finally as Svengali in Trilby.

Dyall died at his home in High Salvington, Worthing, Sussex on 8 May 1950 at the age of 80. He was buried in the churchyard at Thaxted Parish Church in Essex.

== Radio and television ==
Dyall was an early broadcaster in both radio and television. For 2LO, London, he and Forbes-Robertson gave a Shakespearean recital in May 1925, and in August 1939 he headed the cast in two live television transmissions of The Ringer. Other than these, he made few broadcasts until the 1940s, when he appeared frequently in the series Appointment with Fear. (Note: Dyall's son Valentine was the regular narrator ("The Man in Black") of this long-running series, but Dyall senior was a frequent cast member and for several programmes took over the role of narrator.) When television resumed after wartime suspension Dyall once again made two live broadcasts in The Ringer, and in the late 1940s he played a wide range of parts on radio, including John Gabriel Borkman, the Dream Chronicler in A Yank at the Court of King Arthur, Joseph Haydn in Papa Haydn, Anselm in The Miser, Jaggers in Great Expectations, Don Fernando in Henry de Montherlant's The Master of Santiago and, his final role, Gardiner, the Lord Chancellor, in Tyrone Guthrie's adaptation of Tennyson's Queen Mary, broadcast in July 1950 after his death.

== Films ==
Dyall appeared in, produced or directed 26 films between 1916 and 1948.

Year	Title	Role	Notes
1916	Esther		Short
1919	The Garden of Resurrection	Cruickshank	
1920	Duke's Son		Director
1928	Easy Virtue	Aubrey Filton	
1929	Atlantic	John Rool	
1931	A Safe Affair	Rupert Gay	Producer
1931	Alibi	Sir Roger Ackroyd	Lost film
1931	The Ringer	Maurice Meister	
1931	A Night in Montmartre	Max Levine	
1931	Creeping Shadows	Disher	
1932	Men of Steel	Charles Paxton	
1932	First Division		
1933	Called Back	Dr. Jose Manuel	
1933	The Private Life of Henry VIII	Thomas Cromwell	
1933	No Satan		
1934	Mr. Stringfellow Says No	Count Hokana	
1934	The Iron Duke	Blücher	
1935	The Case of Gabriel Perry	Prosecution	
1936	Conquest of the Air	Jerome de Ascoli	
1937	Fire Over England		Uncredited
1937	Captain's Orders	Newton	
1937	Leave It to Me	Sing	
1938	Mr. Satan	Billy	
1940	All at Sea	Dr. Stolk	
1943	Yellow Canary	Captain Foster	
1948	Bonnie Prince Charlie	MacDonald of Keppoch - Morar	(final film role)

== Notes, references and sources ==
=== Sources ===
- Parker, John (1922). Who's Who in the Theatre (fourth ed.). London: Sir Isaac Pitman and Sons. OCLC 10013159.
- Parker, John (1978). Who Was Who in the Theatre. Detroit: Gale Research. OCLC 297602022.
