= The Chinese Puzzle (1932 film) =

1932 British film by Guy Newall

- Trade advertisement from The Daily Film Renter (1 January 1932)
- Directed by: Guy Newall
- Written by: H. Fowler Mear
- Based on: The Chinese Puzzle by Frances Barclay, Marian Bower and Leon M. Lion
- Produced by: Julius Hagen
- Starring: Leon M. Lion; Austin Trevor; Lilian Braithwaite; Elizabeth Allan
- Production company: Julius Hagen Productions
- Distributed by: Woolf and Freedman Film Service
- Release date: 21 March 1932
- Running time: 81 minutes
- Country: United Kingdom
- Language: English

The Chinese Puzzle is a 1932 British crime film directed by Guy Newall and starring Leon M. Lion, Austin Trevor, Lilian Braithwaite, Elizabeth Allan and Francis L. Sullivan. It was written by H. Fowler Mear based on the play The Chinese Puzzle by Frances Barclay, Marian Bower and Lion, which had previously been filmed as The Chinese Puzzle in 1919. It was shot at Twickenham Studios in London by the independent producer Julius Hagen.

== Preservation status ==
The British Film Institute National Archive holds a collection of stills but no film or video materials.

== Plot ==
When the news of a secret diplomatic treaty between China and Britain leaks out, suspicion falls on Roger de la Hay of the Diplomatic Service. Marquis Chi Lung, who owes the de la Hay family a long-standing debt of honour, investigates and finally clears Roger's name.

== Cast ==
- Leon M. Lion as Marquis Chi Lung
- Lilian Braithwaite as Lady de la Haye
- Elizabeth Allan as Naomi Melsham
- Austin Trevor as Paul Markatel
- James Raglan as Sir Charles/Sir Roger
- Jane Welsh as Victoria
- C. M. Hallard as Sir Aylmer Brent
- Mabel Sealby as Mrs. Melsham
- Francis L. Sullivan as Herman Strumm
- Charles Carson as Armand de Rochecorbon
- George Carr as Dr. Fu Yang

== Reception ==
Film Weekly wrote: "The Chinese Puzzle is a competent piece of work – and it is quite good entertainment into the bargain."

Kine Weekly wrote: "The performance of Leon M. Lion as a Chinese dignitary gives distinction to this story of a Chinese debt of honour. The plot is artificial, but the characterisation is good and the production attractive. ... Guy Newall has provided graceful as well as strong situations, and groups his characters well, but his story is rather spun out ... He opens thrillingly, however, and ends dramatically. Dialogue rather swamps action, but is in keeping and provides some humour."

The Daily Film Renter wrote: "Moving story of Chinese Mandarin who owes gratitude for a service, and after many years is called on to pay in dramatic circumstances. Fine portrayal by Leon M. Lion; powerfully developed story told with florid Oriental embellishments; much humour and quiet drama. Strong supporting cast, excellent photography and sound. Splendid booking."
