= What the Butler Saw (1924 film) =

1924 film

- Directed by: George Dewhurst
- Written by: George Dewhurst; Edward Mouillot; Edward Parry
- Produced by: George Dewhurst
- Starring: Irene Rich; Pauline Garon; Guy Newall
- Production company: Dewhurst Productions
- Distributed by: Gaumont British Distributors
- Release date: October 1924
- Country: United Kingdom
- Languages: Silent; English intertitles

What the Butler Saw is a 1924 British silent comedy film directed by George Dewhurst and starring Irene Rich, Pauline Garon and Guy Newall.

== Cast ==
- Irene Rich as Mrs. Barrington
- Pauline Garon as Joan Wyckham
- Guy Newall as Barrington
- Cecil Morton York as Professor Shall
- A.B. Imeson as Sir Charles Foden
- Drusilla Wills as Sophie Foden
- John MacAndrews as Pink
- A. Bromley Davenport as General Dunlop
- Peggy Patterson as Miss Dunlop
- Cecil Mannering as Dr. Boggins
- Hilda Anthony as Mrs. Flemyng-Smith

== Bibliography ==
- Goble, Alan. The Complete Index to Literary Sources in Film. Walter de Gruyter, 1999.
