= Julian Royce =

British actor (1866–1946)

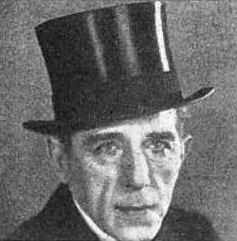
- Born: William Leonard Gardener; 26 May 1866; Chorlton-upon-Medlock, England
- Died: 10 May 1946 (aged 79); Hailsham, England
- Occupation: Actor
- Spouses: Elizabeth Mary Day (m. 1889; died 1898) Ivy Herzog (m. 1899)

Julian Royce (26 May 1866 – 10 May 1946), born William Leonard Gardener, was a British stage and, later, film actor.

== Life and career ==
Royce was christened in Chorlton-upon-Medlock. In 1889 he married an actress, Elizabeth Mary Day ("Nora Day"). The two toured together in 1891, by which time he had adopted the stage name Julian Royce. They appeared together in 1897 in The New Magdalen, and in 1898 they appeared in Sporting Life, by Seymour Hicks and Cecil Raleigh, at the Shaftesbury Theatre in London, with Royce as the evil Malet de Carteret. In 1898 Nora died, of cancer, aged 40. The next year, Royce married Ivy Herzog, who had been in the cast of Sporting Life. The two then sometimes performed and toured together. In 1900, they travelled to America with Lillie Langtry, and played Sir William and Lady Saumarez in The Degenerates on Broadway. After they returned to Britain, they toured in The Messenger Boy, with Julian as the villainous Pyke. For Charles Frohman, he played the title character in William Gillette's play Sherlock Holmes several times over the next years. He and Herzog also toured with Mrs Patrick Campbell. He returned to Broadway in Detective Sparks (1909), Caste (1910), Passers-by (1911), Declassee (1919–1920) and Death Takes a Holiday, as Duke Lambert (1931).

He began a film career in the silent film era and continued making films through the 1930s.

Royce died at Hailsham in 1946, aged 79. His wife died later the same year.

== Selected filmography ==
- Iron Justice (1915)
- Honour in Pawn (1916)
- Derelicts (1917)
- Not Negotiable (1918)
- The Bigamist (1921)
- The Persistent Lovers (1922)
- Running Water (1922)
- The Knockout (1923)
- God's Clay (1928)
- This Is the Life (1933)
- Call Me Mame (1933)
- She Was Only a Village Maiden (1933)
- Leave It to Blanche (1934)
- Two Hearts in Harmony (1935)
- So You Won't Talk (1935)
- Birds of a Feather (1936)
