= The Lost Chord (1933 film) =

- Directed by: Maurice Elvey
- Written by: H. Fowler Mear
- Produced by: Julius Hagen
- Starring: John Stuart; Elizabeth Allan; Jack Hawkins
- Cinematography: Sydney Blythe
- Music by: W. L. Trytel
- Production company: Julius Hagen Productions
- Release date: April 1933
- Running time: 70 minutes
- Country: United Kingdom
- Language: English

The Lost Chord is a 1933 British drama film directed by Maurice Elvey and starring John Stuart, Elizabeth Allan and Jack Hawkins. It was written by H. Fowler Mear and concerns a musician who becomes embroiled in the domestic rows of an aristocratic family. It was inspired by the Arthur Sullivan song The Lost Chord. Two earlier films directed by Wilfred Noy, The Lost Chord (1917) and The Lost Chord (1925), were both also based on the song. The film was made at Twickenham Studios.

== Cast ==
- John Stuart as David Graham
- Elizabeth Allan as Joan Elton
- Mary Glynne as Countess Madeleine
- Anne Grey as Pauline
- Leslie Perrins as Count Carol Zara
- Jack Hawkins as Dr. Jim Selby
- Garry Marsh as Joseph Mendel
- Betty Astell as Madge
- Frederick Ranalow as Beppo
- Barbara Everest as Mother Superior
- Bernard Ansell as Benito Levina
- Eliot Makeham as Bertie Pollard
- Tudor Davies as the singer
- Billy Mayerl as man at the piano

== Critical reception ==
Kine Weekly wrote: "The narrative is constructed with experienced dramatic skill, and it is carried pleasantly through the essential paths, building up good, honest entertainment cunningly attuned to the requirements of the masses."

In 1937, Variety gave a negative review, and wrote, "Film shortage in the Broadway houses has grown so acute they've resurrected this piece of wreckage out of the past – 1933 and showing its age. No use wasting time and space recounting all the flaws in the pic. Just about everything possible is wrong, from the writing, production, direction, acting, to the final editing. If there are merits, they aren't visible ... If the pic does nothing else, it shows how far film methods have progressed in four years, though even then this would have been a bad production."
