= Fox Farm (film) =

1922 film

- Directed by: Guy Newall
- Written by: Warwick Deeping (novel); Guy Newall
- Starring: Guy Newall; Ivy Duke; Barbara Everest; Cameron Carr
- Cinematography: Hal Young
- Production company: George Clark Productions
- Distributed by: Stoll Pictures
- Release date: 1922
- Country: United Kingdom
- Languages: Silent; English intertitles

Fox Farm is a 1922 British silent drama film directed by Guy Newall and starring Newall, Ivy Duke and Barbara Everest. It is based on the 1911 novel Fox Farm by Warwick Deeping. A farmer's wife becomes obsessed with the high life, and abandons him after he loses his sight. It was made at Beaconsfield Studios. Unlike many of the era, the film is still extant.

== Cast ==
- Guy Newall - James Falconer
- Ivy Duke - Ann Wetherall
- Barbara Everest - Kate Falconer
- Cameron Carr - Jack Rickerby
- A. Bromley Davenport - Sam Wetherall
- Charles Evemy - Slim Wetherall
- John Alexander - Jacob Boase

== Bibliography ==
- Bamford, Kenton. Distorted Images: British National Identity and Film in the 1920s. I.B. Tauris, 1999.
- Warren, Patricia. British Film Studios: An Illustrated History. Batsford, 2001.
