= Barbara Everest =

British actress (1890–1968)

- Born: 19 June 1890; Southfields, Surrey, England, United Kingdom
- Died: 9 February 1968 (aged 77); London, England
- Occupation: Actress
- Years active: 1916–1968

Barbara Everest (19 June 1890 – 9 February 1968) was a British stage and film actress. She was born in Southfields, Surrey, and made her screen debut in the 1916 film The Man Without a Soul. On stage she played Queen Anne in the 1935 historical play Viceroy Sarah by Norman Ginsbury. Her most famous rôle was Elizabeth, the rather deaf servant in Gaslight (1944).

== Selected filmography ==
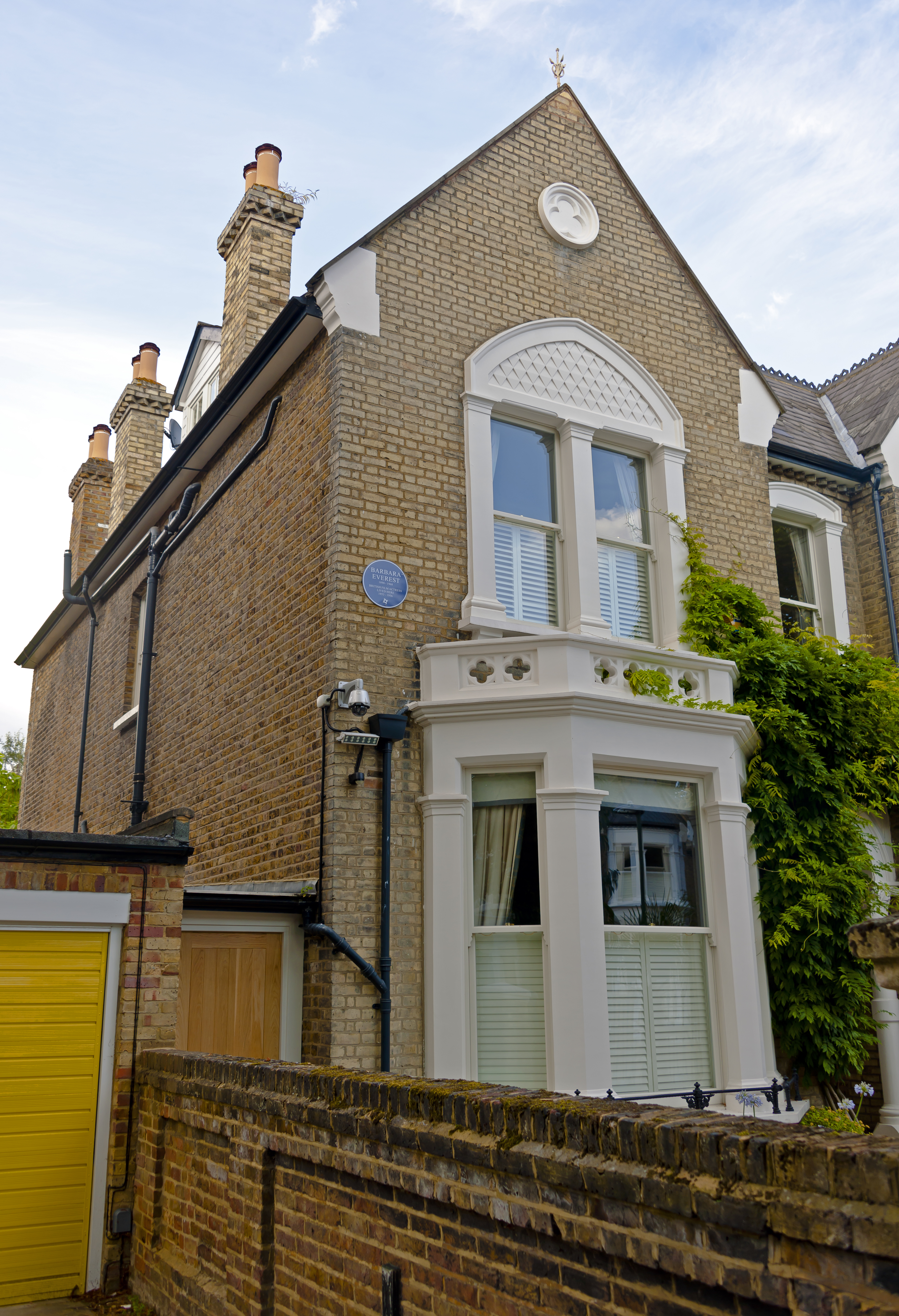
Everest's London house near Kew Gardens, with blue plaque

- The Hypocrites (1916) – Helen Plugenet
- The Man without a Soul (1916) – Elaine Ferrier
- Whosoever Shall Offend (1919) – Maddalena
- Not Guilty (1919) – Hetty Challis
- The Lady Clare (1919) – Alice
- Calvary (1920) – Rachel Penryn
- The Joyous Adventures of Aristide Pujol (1920) – Anne
- Testimony (1920) – Lucinda
- The Bigamist (1921) – Blanche Maitland
- A Romance of Old Baghdad (1922) – Mrs. Jocelyn
- The Persistent Lovers (1922) – Joyce
- Fox Farm (1922) – Kate Falconer
- Lily Christine (1932) – Hempel
- When London Sleeps (1932) – Madame Lamberti
- The Lodger (1932) – Mrs. Bunting
- There Goes the Bride (1932) – Mme. Marquand (uncredited)
- The Roof (1933) – Mrs. Foster
- She Was Only a Village Maiden (1933) – Agatha
- The Lost Chord (1933) – Mother Superior
- The Umbrella (1933) – Mrs. Wynne
- Love's Old Sweet Song (1933) – Nurse
- Home Sweet Home (1933)
- The River Wolves (1934)
- The Warren Case (1934) – (uncredited)
- Passing Shadows (1934) – Mrs. Lawrence
- Song at Eventide (1934)
- The Lad (1935) – Mrs. Lorraine
- Royal Cavalcade (1935) – Undetermined Minor Role (uncredited)
- The Passing of the Third Floor Back (1935) – Cook
- Scrooge (1935) – Mrs. Cratchit
- Love in Exile (1936) – Anna
- Men of Yesterday (1936)
- The Man Behind the Mask (1936) – Lady Slade
- Jump for Glory (1937) – Mrs. Nolan
- Old Mother Riley (1937) – Mrs. Briggs
- Death Croons the Blues (1937)
- Trunk Crime (1939) – Ursula
- Discoveries (1939) – Mrs. Venters
- Inquest (1939) – Mrs. Wyatt
- Meet Maxwell Archer (1940) – Miss Duke
- The Second Mr. Bush (1940) – Mrs. Windel-Tod
- The Prime Minister (1941) – Baroness Lehzen (uncredited)
- This Man Is Dangerous (1941) – Mrs. Cardby
- He Found a Star (1941) – Mrs. Cavour
- Commandos Strike at Dawn (1942) – Mrs. Olav
- Forever and a Day (1943) – Girl's Mother in Air Raid Shelter
- Mission to Moscow (1943) – Mrs. Litvinov
- Phantom of the Opera (1943) – Aunt
- Jane Eyre (1943) – Lady Ingraham
- The Uninvited (1944) – Lizzie Flynn
- Gaslight (1944) – Elizabeth
- The Valley of Decision (1945) – Delia
- The Fatal Witness (1945) – Lady Elizabeth Ferguson / Vera Cavanaugh
- Wanted for Murder (1946) – Mrs. Colebrooke
- Frieda (1947) – Mrs Dawson
- The Long Mirror (1948) - Mrs.Tenbury
- Children of Chance (1949) – Francesca
- Madeleine (1950) – Mrs. Smith
- Tony Draws a Horse (1950) – Mrs. Parsons
- An Inspector Calls (1954) – committee member
- The Safecracker (1958) – Mrs. Dawson
- The World, the Flesh and the Devil (1959) – Mrs. Brophy
- Upstairs and Downstairs (1959) – 2nd Old Lady
- El Cid (1961) – Mother Superior
- Dangerous Afternoon (1961) – Mrs. Judson
- The Damned (1963) – Miss Lamont
- Nurse on Wheels (1963) – Nurse Merrick
- The Man Who Finally Died (1963) – Martha Gelman
- Rotten to the Core (1965) – Mrs. Dick
- Trouble with Junia (1967) – Ada
- Franchette: Les Intrigues (1969) – (final film role)
