= The Mirage (1920 film) =

1920 film

The Mirage is a 1920 British silent romance film directed by Arthur Rooke and starring Edward O'Neill, Dorothy Holmes-Gore and Douglas Munro. The screenplay was written by Guy Newall and Ivy Duke based on a story by E. Temple Thurston. The screenplay concerns a poor French aristocrat living in Bloomsbury who falls in love with a woman.

== Cast ==
- Edward O'Neill ... Viscount Guescon
- Dorothy Holmes-Gore ... Rozanne
- Douglas Munro ... Courtot
- Geoffrey Kerr ... Richard Dalziell
- Blanche Stanley ... Mrs. Bulpitt
- William Parry ... Somerset
