= The Persistent Lovers =

1922 film

- Directed by: Guy Newall
- Written by: Guy Newall
- Based on: The Persistent Lovers; 1915 novel by A. Hamilton Gibbs
- Produced by: George Clark
- Starring: Guy Newall; Ivy Duke; A. Bromley Davenport; Julian Royce
- Cinematography: Bert Ford
- Production company: George Clark Productions
- Distributed by: Stoll Pictures
- Release date: April 1922
- Running time: 6,420 feet
- Country: United Kingdom
- Languages: Silent; English intertitles

The Persistent Lovers is a 1922 British silent drama film directed by Guy Newall and starring Newall, Ivy Duke and A. Bromley Davenport. It was an adaptation of a 1915 novel by A. Hamilton Gibbs.

== Plot summary ==
Richard Ardley-Manners, the irresponsible son of Reverend Ardley-Manners and a former Oxford student without a clear career path, wins the heart of Lady Audrey Beaumont, a fascinating and unconventional girl. To his surprise, he discovers that she is the daughter of a duke, specifically the Duke of Harborough. Seeking a way to be worthy of her, Ardley-Manners takes up work on a Devon fruit farm to become a better man. Meanwhile, Lady Audrey, fleeing from her father's anger and seeking her own path, leaves the ducal estate to become a dairymaid, demonstrating her independent nature and devotion to her own beliefs. The love between Richard and Lady Audrey persists despite the challenges posed by their social standings and familial expectations.

== Production ==
Half of the film's scenes were shot in Nice, France while Newall's Beaconsfield Film Studios was under construction. In order to maintain the appearance of an "English" film, Newall chose English-style "interiors" for filming locations. Most of the "exteriors" were photographed on the Norfolk Broads.

During one scene, Ivy Duke punches Lawford Davidson "in the ear" to admonish his misbehavior. Lawford Davidson later reported: "But the first punch I received was a very meek one, and I remonstrated 'That won't do, you must really hit me. After that there were about three rehearsals, the last was 'shot'—and by that time I received such an effective punch, that I had jaw-ache for three whole days."

== Cast ==
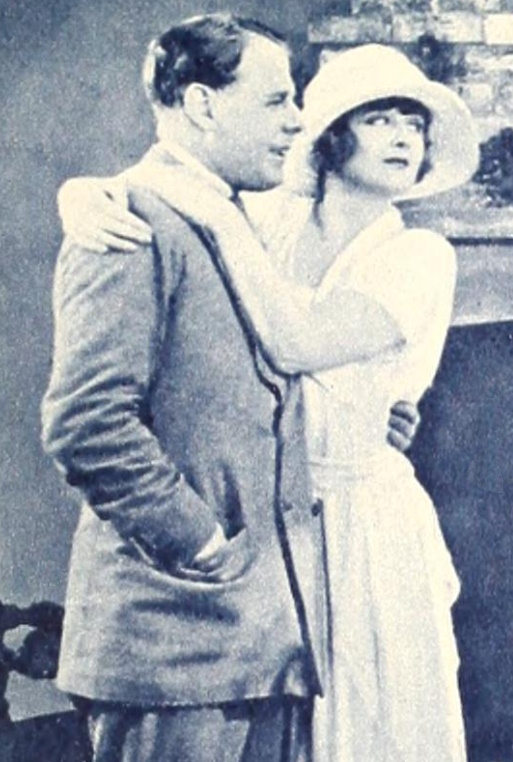
Guy Newall and Ivy Duke in Persistent Lovers, published in The Picturegoer, May 1922.

- Guy Newall - Richard Ardley-Manners
- Ivy Duke - Lady Audrey Beaumont
- A. Bromley Davenport - Duke of Harborough
- Julian Royce - Anthony Waring
- Lawford Davidson - Honorable Ivor Jocelyn
- Barbara Everest - Joyce
- Douglas Munro - John
- Ernest A. Douglas - Reverend Ardley-Manners
- Emilie Nichol - Duchess

== Bibliography ==
- Low, Rachael. History of the British Film, 1918-1929. George Allen & Unwin, 1971.
