= The Road to Fortune =

1930 film

- Trade advertisement for the film as supporting feature for Safety in Numbers
- Directed by: Arthur Varney
- Written by: Hugh Broadbridge
- Produced by: Arthur Varney
- Starring: Guy Newall; Florence Desmond
- Music by: Doria March
- Production company: Starcraft
- Distributed by: Paramount British Pictures
- Release date: 29 August 1930
- Running time: 60 minutes
- Country: United Kingdom
- Language: English

The Road to Fortune is a 1930 British drama film directed by Arthur Varney and starring Guy Newall, Doria March and Florence Desmond. It was based on a novel by Hugh Broadbridge.

It was shot at Twickenham Studios and on location in Cornwall, as a quota quickie for release by Paramount Pictures.

== Preservation status ==
The British Film Institute National Archive holds a collection of ephemera but no film or video materials.

== Plot ==
Young widow June refuses to marry Guy until she is certain of his character. She retreats to her uncle's house in Cornwall, where she is soon followed by Guy and her younger sister Toots. Meanwhile, a madman named Willard, who is trying to force June's uncle to sell him land near a tin mine, traps June and her uncle inside a cabin. The pair manage to escape via a secret passage leading out to the cliffside. There, Guy confronts Willard and, after a dramatic struggle, sends him hurtling into the sea, proving his mettle once and for all.

== Cast ==
- Guy Newall as Guy Seaton
- Doria March as June Eastman
- Florence Desmond as Toots Willoughby
- Stanley Cooke as Professor Kingsbury
- George Vollaire as Dr. Killick
- J.H. Wakefield as Willard
- Jean Lester as Miss Lurcher

== Reception ==
Film Weekly wrote: "The story of this film is hardly strong enough to hold one's interest; and, handled as it is without much enterprise, it is not likely to appeaI in any degree to the average flmgoer."

Kine Weekly wrote: "A far fetched and unconvincing story, staged in Cornwall. Production and acting are moderate, and the entertainment value unfortunately cannot rank high. ... Continuity is jerky and production generaily indifferent."

The Daily Film Renter wrote: "Little space need be wasted upon this Quota picture, which Paramount are releasing, for a more amateurish effort it has seldom been our lot to witness. ... Guy Newall is the featured player, but the part doesn't give him the slightest chance to show his undoubted talent. Just a Quota picture, and a very poor one at that. Where audiences in the smaller kinemas are easily pleased and entirely uncritical it may appeal."

Picture Show wrote: "The beautiful Cornish exteriors in this picture are spoilt by the poor acting and directing which make the story hard to follow and exceelingly tedious."
