= Weavers of Fortune =

1922 film

- Directed by: Arthur Rooke
- Written by: Kinchen Wood
- Production company: I.B. Davidson
- Distributed by: Granger Films
- Release date: December 1922
- Country: United Kingdom
- Languages: Silent; English intertitles

Weavers of Fortune is a 1922 British silent sports film directed by Arthur Rooke and starring Henry Vibart, Dacia and Derek Glynne.

== Cast ==
- Henry Vibart as Jackson
- Dacia as Minna Vandyck
- Derek Glynne as Tom Winter
- Myrtle Vibart as Molly Jackson

== See also ==
- List of films about horses

== Bibliography ==
- Low, Rachael. History of the British Film, 1918-1929. George Allen & Unwin, 1971.
