= The Lure of Crooning Water =

1920 film

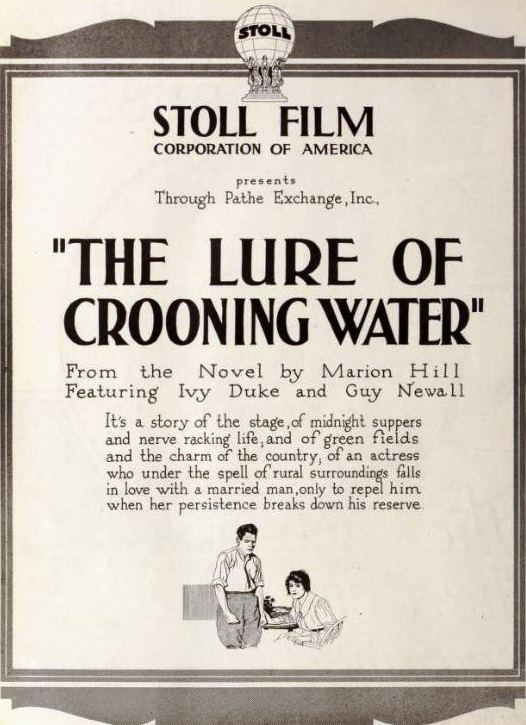
- American advertisement
- Directed by: Arthur Rooke
- Release date: 1920
- Running time: 105 minutes
- Country: United Kingdom
- Language: Silent

The Lure of Crooning Water is a 1920 British silent comedy romance film directed by Arthur Rooke and starring Guy Newall, Ivy Duke and Hugh Buckler. It is adapted from a novel by Marion Hill and was one of several rural romances directed by Rooke. At least one copy of the film survives.

== Plot ==
The film tells the story of Georgette Verlaine (Duke), a stage actress who is persuaded by Dr. John Longden (Buckler), who loves her, to recuperate in the countryside as her lifestyle is ruining her health. She stays at a place called "Crooning Water" with Horace Dornblazer (Newall), his wife Rachel (Dibley), and their three children. The only man not captivated by her is Horace, prompting her to try and win his admiration. When she succeeds, she returns to London, pursued by Horace who has left his family. However, she tells him she did not love him, only admired his honor and fidelity, so Horace returns to his forgiving family. Georgette soon tires of frivolity and returns to Crooning Water where she too is forgiven, before returning to London to marry the doctor.

== Cast ==
- Guy Newall as Horace Dornblazer
- Ivy Duke as Georgette
- Hugh Buckler as Dr. John Longden
- Douglas Munro as Yes Smith
- Mary Dibley as Rachel Dornblazer
- Lawford Davidson as Frank Howard
- Arthur Chesney as Gerald Pinkerton
- Winifred Sadler as Mrs. Dusenberry

== Bibliography ==
- Bamford, Kenton. Distorted Images: British National Identity and Film in the 1920s. I.B. Tauris, 1999.
