= Hugh Buckler =

British actor (1881–1936)

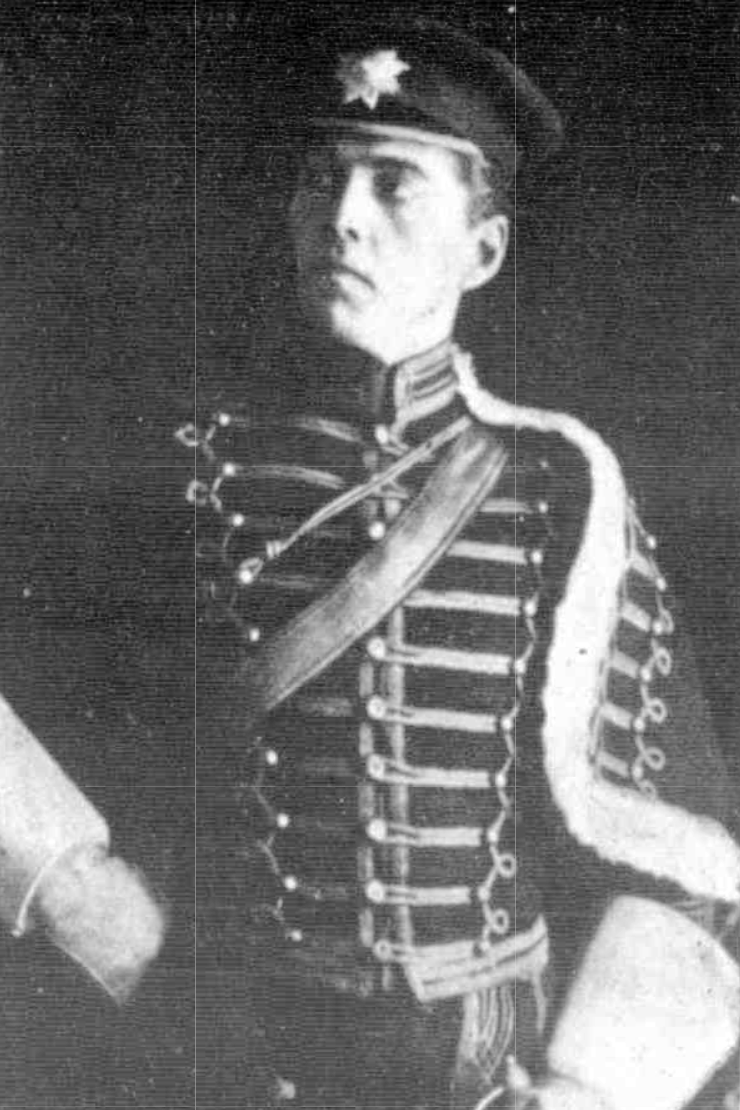
- Butler in 1912
- Born: 9 September 1881; Southampton, Hampshire, UK
- Died: 30 October 1936 (aged 55); Malibou Lake, California, U.S.
- Occupation: Film actor
- Years active: 1919–1936
- Spouse: Violet Buckler (1905–1936)
- Children: John Buckler

Hugh Chilman Buckler (9 September 1881 – 30 October 1936) was a British actor. He was married to stage actress Violet Paget, who was somehow related to the Marquess of Anglesey. The film actor John Buckler was their son.

== History ==
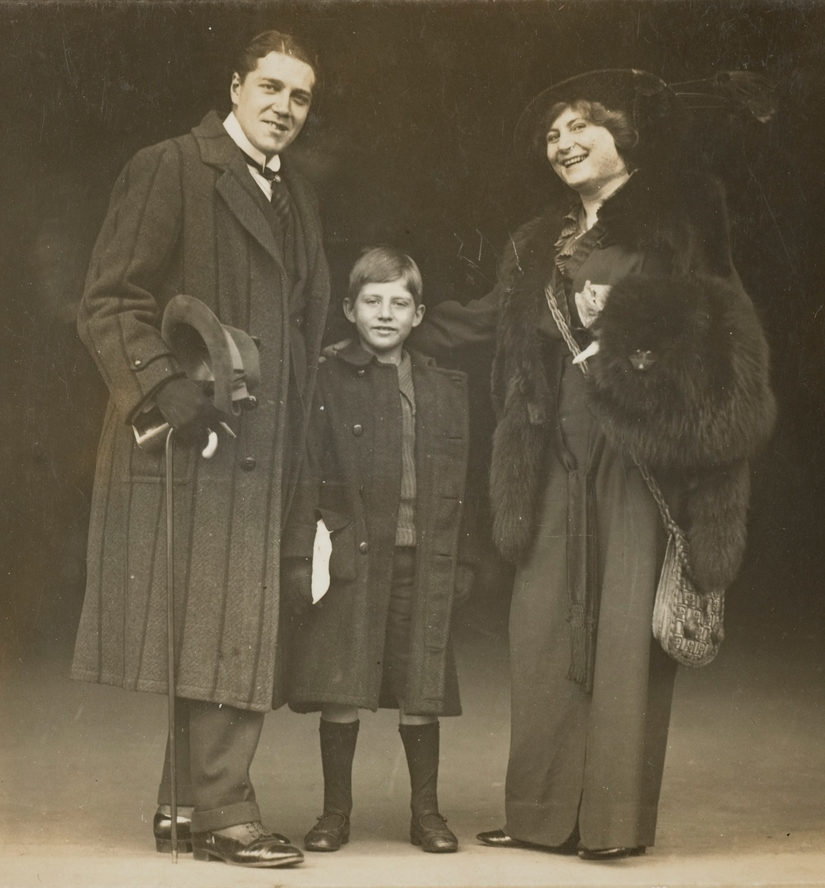
Buckler family 1914

In 1909 Buckler and Paget were in England, with George Willoughby's Farcical Comedy Company, touring Weedon Grossmith's The Night of the Party, which production was brought out to Australia by Rupert Clarke and Clyde Meynell, opening at the Princess's Theatre, Melbourne on 26 February 1910.

Buckler and Paget founded Sydney's Little Theatre in 1913.

Their eight-year-old son John, or Jack, had been living in England while his parents were touring, and joined his parents sometime around August 1914. In the first few months that Jack was in Sydney and Brisbane his talent for acting became evident.

Buckler, who was a reserve officer with the Royal Irish Rifles, volunteered for service with the outbreak of war, and received a commission with his old regiment leaving Melbourne by the R.M.S. Maloja on 12 January 1915, and saw some fighting with the 4th Battalion, Worcester Regiment. A rumor that he had a leg amputated below the knee and another, that he was killed in action, were without foundation but he was wounded and his wife and son left for Egypt, where he had been hospitalized, in November 1915.

In London in 1919 he founded a "Bohemian" club, the "Junior Savage" in a spacious loft over 5–6 Market Street, off Jermyn Street, Piccadilly.

In March 1923, while playing Decameron Nights at Drury Lane Theatre, he was charged with passing a cheque while bankrupt, but acquitted. A year later Buckler and Paget were in America, with Henry Jewett's repertory company in Boston.

In 1931 he has in New York, playing Antonio in The Merchant of Venice to Maurice Moscovitch's Shylock.

In 1936 he visited his actor son John Buckler in Hollywood and the same week was signed for the part of Gainsford in Lost Horizon. Father and son died together when their car left the road and plunged into Malibou Lake.

== Selected filmography ==
- The Garden of Resurrection (1919)
- The Lure of Crooning Water (1920)
- Duke's Son (1920)
- The Place of Honour (1921)
- The Nonentity (1921)
- Belonging (1922)
- Guy Fawkes (1923)
- Carry on, Sergeant! (1928)
- The Last of the Mohicans (1936)
- The Jungle Princess (1936)
- Crash Donovan (1936)
- Lost Horizon (1937)
