= Fancy Dress (1919 film) =

1919 British silent comedy film

- Directed by: Kenelm Foss
- Written by: Kenelm Foss
- Produced by: George Clarke; Guy Newall
- Starring: Godfrey Tearle; Ivy Duke; Guy Newall
- Production company: Lucky Cat Films
- Distributed by: Ideal Films
- Release date: September 1919
- Country: United Kingdom
- Languages: Silent; English intertitles

Fancy Dress is a 1919 British silent comedy film directed by Kenelm Foss and starring Godfrey Tearle, Ivy Duke and Guy Newall. A lawyer hires a strolling player to impersonate an aristocrat.

== Cast ==
- Godfrey Tearle as Tony Broke
- Ivy Duke as Hebe
- Guy Newall as Earl of Richborne
- Will Corrie as The Guv
- Elaine Madison as Eighth Wonder
- Frank Miller as Dick Scribe
- George Tawde as Mike
- Kitty Barlow as Ma
- Patricia Stannard as Mrs. Van Graft
- Bryan Powley as Mr. Rong
- James English as Mr. Wright

== Bibliography ==
- Low, Rachael. History of the British Film, 1918-1929. George Allen & Unwin, 1971.
