= Money for Nothing (1916 film) =

1916 film by Maurice Elvey

Money for Nothing is 1916 short film directed by Maurice Elvey from a play by Arthur Eckersley. The cast features Guy Newall in the role of the Rev. Cuthbert Cheese, a curate on holiday whom gem thieves mistake for a detective.
