= Elizabeth Allan =

English actress (1910–1990)

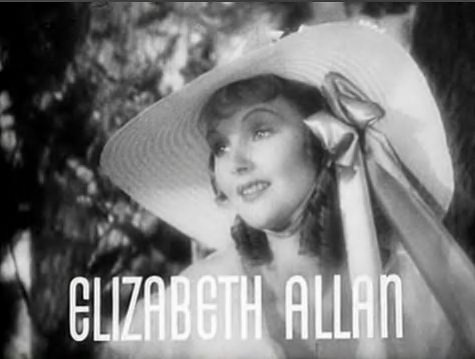
- Elizabeth Allan in the trailer for Camille (1936)
- Born: 9 April 1910; Skegness, Lincolnshire, England
- Died: 27 July 1990 (aged 80); Hove, East Sussex, England
- Occupation: Actress
- Years active: 1927–1967
- Spouse: Wilfrid J. O'Bryen (m. 1932; died 1977)

Elizabeth Allan (9 April 1910 – 27 July 1990) was an English stage and film actress who worked in both Britain and Hollywood, where she appeared in 50 films.

== Life and career ==
Allan was born in Skegness, Lincolnshire in 1910 and educated in Darlington, County Durham. At age 17, she made her stage debut at the Old Vic. She made her film debut four years later in Alibi.

She appeared in a number of films for Julius Hagen's Twickenham Studios, but was also featured in Gainsborough's Michael and Mary and Korda's Service for Ladies. In 1932 she married agent Wilfrid J. O'Bryen, to whom she was introduced by actor Herbert Marshall; they were together until his death in 1977.

Her first US/UK co-production and first US production came in 1933, and she worked in the United States under contract with Metro-Goldwyn-Mayer. 1935 was her most memorable year in Hollywood, when she not only distinguished herself in two memorable Dickens' adaptations as David's unfortunate young mother in George Cukor's David Copperfield and as Lucie Manette in Jack Conway's A Tale of Two Cities, but was also featured in Tod Browning's Mark of the Vampire.

Allan did not think highly of the latter film, to which she had been assigned, and considered it "slumming". MGM announced her for a leading part in King Vidor's The Citadel, but she was subsequently replaced by Rosalind Russell. When she was replaced again by Greer Garson in Goodbye, Mr Chips, Elizabeth successfully sued the studio. The studio retaliated by refusing to let her work, and, frustrated, she returned to the UK in 1938. The same year she appeared onstage in the West End farce The Innocent Party alongside Basil Radford and Cecil Parker. In 1939 she was in the West End production of Max Catto's Punch without Judy.

By the 1950s, Allan had made the transition to character parts. Particularly memorable is her appearance as Trevor Howard's brittle and dissatisfied wife in the film adaptation of Graham Greene's The Heart of the Matter (1953). In 1958, she appeared as Boris Karloff's wife in The Haunted Strangler. Late in her career, she was a frequent panellist on television game shows, including the British version of What's My Line?. She was named Great Britain's Top Female TV Personality of 1952.

== Death ==
She died at Hove, on the Sussex coast, at age 80. She was cremated at Woodvale Crematorium in Brighton and the ashes were taken by the family.

== Legacy ==
Her name is on Brighton & Hove's Scania OmniDekka bus 655.

== Filmography ==
=== Film ===
Year	Title	Role	Notes
1931	Alibi	Ursula Browne	
1931	Rodney Steps In	Masked Lady	Short subject
1931	The Rosary	Vera Mannering	
1931	Black Coffee	Barbara Amory	
1931	Chin Chin Chinaman	Olga Dureska	
1931	Michael and Mary	Romo	
1931	Many Waters	Freda Barcaldine	
1932	Service for Ladies	Sylvia Robertson	
1932	The Chinese Puzzle	Naomi Melsham	
1932	Nine till Six	Gracie Abbott	
1932	Down Our Street	Maisie Collins	
1932	Insult	Pola Dubois	
1932	The Lodger	Daisy Bunting	
1933	The Shadow	Sonia Bryant	
1933	Looking Forward	Caroline Service	
1933	The Lost Chord	Joan Elton	
1933	No Marriage Ties	Peggy Wilson	
1933	The Solitaire Man	Helen Heming	
1933	Ace of Aces	Nancy Adams	
1934	The Mystery of Mr. X	Jane Frensham	
1934	Men in White	Barbara	
1934	Java Head	Nettie Vollar	
1934	Outcast Lady	Venice Harpenden	
1935	David Copperfield	Clara Copperfield	
1935	Mark of the Vampire	Irena Borotyn	
1935	A Tale of Two Cities	Lucie Manette	
1936	A Woman Rebels	Flora Anne Thistlewaite	
1936	Camille	Nichette	
1937	The Soldier and the Lady	Nadia	
1937	Slave Ship	Nancy Marlowe	
1938	Dangerous Medicine	Victoria Ainswell	
1938	It Might Be You	Betty	Short subject
1939	Inquest	Margaret Hamilton	
1940	The Girl Who Forgot	Leonora Barradine	
1940	Saloon Bar	Queenie King	
1942	Went the Day Well?	Peggy Pryde	
1942	The Great Mr. Handel	Mrs. Cibber	
1945	He Snoops to Conquer	Jane Strawbridge	
1948	Virtuoso	Judith Wainwright	
1949	If This Be Sin	Sybil	
1951	No Highway in the Sky	Shirley Scott	
1952	Folly to Be Wise	Angela Prout	
1953	Twice Upon a Time	Carol-Anne Bailey	
1953	The Heart of the Matter	Louise Scobie	
1954	Front Page Story	Susan Grant	
1955	The Brain Machine	Philippa Roberts	
1957	Going Shopping with Elizabeth Allan BFI	Herself (with commentary by David Jacobs (broadcaster)	(Short film, at Harrods)
1958	The Haunted Strangler	Barbara Rankin	

=== Television ===
Year	Title	Role	Notes
1951	The Concert	Frances Hein	TV film
1955–56	The Adventures of Annabel	Annabel	TV series
1956	The Chalet	Cyra Carter	TV film
1956	The Adventures of Aggie	Toni	Episode: "Top Secret"
1961	Call Oxbridge 2000	Peggy Graham	TV series
