= Charles Dalmon =

British poet and film designer

Charles William Dalmon (1862–1938) was a British poet, 1890s decadent, 1920s film designer, and friend of Noël Coward.

== Life ==
Dalmon was a contributor to The Yellow Book, and was published in The Living Age, in the mid-1890s. His poems subsequently appeared in many anthologies, but his reputation was never bright. Jean Moorcroft Wilson notes that Siegfried Sassoon and Ralph Hodgson planned to publish "small, neglected authors", into which group Dalmon fell with Thomas Ashe and Primovard Dugard.

There are ascriptions to Dalmon of Manx songs and ballads, which may be collector's or editor's rather than author's credits. O what if the fowler my blackbird has taken? is given as by him, but there is a related old ballad. The (Red) Fuchsia Tree, set by Roger Quilter and John Raynor, is attributed to Dalmon but may be traditional.

In December 1934, Charles Dalmon 'Sussex poet' and 'descendant of Tudor Court Favourite' joined the British Union of Fascists.

== Works ==
- Minutiae (1892)
- Song Favours (1895)
- Flower And Leaf (1900)
- A Poor Man's Riches (1922)
- Singing As I Go (1927)
- The Last Service (1928)
