= Mutiny (1925 film) =

1925 film

- Directed by: Floyd Martin Thornton
- Written by: Ben Bolt (novel)
- Production company: George Clark Productions
- Distributed by: Ducal Films
- Release date: January 1925
- Country: United Kingdom
- Languages: Silent; English intertitles

Mutiny is a 1925 British silent adventure film directed by F. Martin Thornton and starring Nigel Barrie, Doris Lytton and Walter Tennyson.

== Cast ==
- Nigel Barrie as John England
- Doris Lytton as Diana
- Walter Tennyson
- Clifton Boyne
- Donald Searle

== Bibliography ==
- Goble, Alan. The Complete Index to Literary Sources in Film. Walter de Gruyter, 1999.
