= Rachael Low =

British film historian

Rachael Low (6 July 1923 – 14 December 2014) was a British film historian, best known as the author of the seven-volume The History of the British Film.

The daughter of the cartoonist Sir David Low, she gained her BSc in sociology and economics in 1944 from the London School of Economics, and her doctorate from the University of London in 1949. She published, in seven volumes between 1948 and 1985, The History of the British Film; this examines, in exacting detail, film production in Britain from its origins in 1896 until 1939. She was awarded a Research Fellowship by Lucy Cavendish College, Cambridge, to facilitate her work on the later volumes of the series.

Film critic Matthew Sweet has criticised Low's "tyrannous influence" on the writings of subsequent film historians.

== Legacy ==
The annual Rachael Low Lecture was established in 2007 in her honour, as part of the British Silent Film Festival. In December 2018, an event was held at the British Film Institute Library to assess her legacy and mark her contribution to the history of early British film.

== Principal works ==
Originally published by George Allen & Unwin, Low's history is now published by Routledge.

- The History of the British Film 1896–1906 (with Roger Manvell), Allen & Unwin, 1948
- The History of the British Film 1906–1914, Allen & Unwin, 1948
- The History of the British Film 1914–1918, Allen & Unwin, 1948
- The History of the British Film 1918–1929, Allen & Unwin, 1950
- The History of the British Film 1929–1939: Films of Comment and Persuasion of the 1930s, Allen & Unwin, 1979
- The History of the British Film 1929–1939: Documentary and Educational films of the 1930s, Allen & Unwin, 1979
- The History of the British Film: Film Making in 1930s Britain, Allen & Unwin, 1985
