= Ivy Duke =

British actress (1896–1937)

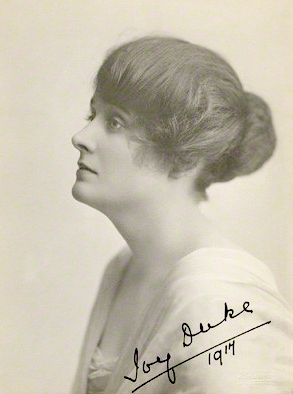
- Ivy Duke in 1917
- Born: Ivy Elsie Duke; 9 June 1896; Kensington, London; United Kingdom
- Died: 8 November 1937 (aged 41); London, United Kingdom
- Occupation: Actress
- Years active: 1919 - 1928 (film)

Ivy Duke (9 June 1896 – 8 November 1937) was a British actress. She was married to the actor and director Guy Newall with whom she co-starred in several films.

== Filmography ==
- The March Hare (1919)
- The Double Life of Mr. Alfred Burton (1919)
- I Will (1919)
- Fancy Dress (1919)
- The Garden of Resurrection (1919)
- Duke's Son (1920)
- The Lure of Crooning Water (1920)
- Testimony (1920)
- The Bigamist (1921)
- The Persistent Lovers (1922)
- Boy Woodburn (1922)
- Fox Farm (1922)
- A Maid of the Silver Sea (1922)
- The Starlit Garden (1923)
- The Great Prince Shan (1924)
- Decameron Nights (1924)
- A Knight in London (1929)
