= Arthur Rooke =

British actor and film director

Arthur Henry Rooke (18 May 1878 – 1947) was a British actor and film director of the silent era. Rooke had worked in the theatre for many years before he went into films. He initially co-directed several films with A.E. Coleby, but later began directing films by himself. By the early 1920s, he was one of the more successful British film directors.

== Selected filmography ==
Director

- Thelma (1918)
- God's Clay (1919)
- The Mirage (1920)
- The Lure of Crooning Water (1920)
- A Sporting Double (1922)
- Weavers of Fortune (1922)
- A Bachelor's Baby (1922)
- The Sporting Instinct (1922)
- M'Lord of the White Road (1923)
- The Scandal (1923)
- The Gay Corinthian (1924)
- Nets of Destiny (1924)
- The Wine of Life (1924)
- The Diamond Man (1924)
- The Blue Peter (1928)

Actor

- Thelma (1918)
- God's Clay (1919)

== Bibliography ==
- Bamford, Kenton. Distorted Images: British National Identity and Film in the 1920s. I.B. Tauris, 1999.
