= Stoll Pictures =

British film company

- Industry: Film
- Founded: April 1918

Stoll Pictures was a British film production and distribution company of the silent era, founded in April 1918.

== Background ==
During the early to mid-1920s it was the largest film company in Britain and one of the biggest in Europe. Its major domestic rival was the Ideal Film Company. Stoll's films were primarily made at its Cricklewood Studios, although the smaller Surbiton Studios were also used during the early years of the company's existence. The company takes its name from its founder Sir Oswald Stoll, better known today as a theatre owner.

Stoll produced a series of expensive films during the early 1920s such as The Four Feathers and The Prodigal Son - which cost £37,000 (equivalent to £2.67 million in 2023), and was at the time the most expensive British production ever. The film's original release length of 18,454 feet made it the longest commercially made British film. The studio was a major victim of the Slump of 1924 and cut back production, relying on several co-productions with European firms. The company became particularly known for its film series such as Fu Manchu and Sherlock Holmes. The company ran its own magazine Stoll's Editorial News.

== See also ==
- List of Stoll Pictures films

== Bibliography ==
- Low, Rachael. The History of the British Film, 1918-1929. George Allen & Unwin, 1971.
- Murphy, Robert. The British Cinema Book, Second Edition. British Film Institute, 2003.
