= The Man Who Stayed at Home =

The Man Who Stayed at Home may refer to:

- The Man Who Stayed at Home (play), a 1914 play by J. E. Harold Terry and Lechmere Worrall
- The Man Who Stayed at Home (1915 film), a British silent thriller film, based on the play
- The Man Who Stayed at Home (1919 film), an American silent adventure drama film, based on the play
