= Bentley's Conscience =

1922 British film by Denison Clift

- Directed by: Denison Clift
- Written by: Denison Clift; Paul Trent (Novel)
- Starring: Robert Loraine; Betty Faire; Henry Victor; Harvey Braban
- Production company: Ideal Film Company
- Distributed by: Ideal Film Company
- Release date: 1922
- Country: United Kingdom
- Language: English

Bentley's Conscience is a 1922 British silent drama film directed by Denison Clift and starring Robert Loraine, Betty Faire and Henry Victor.

== Cast ==
- Robert Loraine as Clive Bentley
- Betty Faire as Diane carson
- Henry Victor as Fletcer
- Harvey Braban as Richard Glym
- Ivo Dawson as Murdoch
- J. Fisher White as John Carson
