= J. E. Harold Terry =

English novelist, playwright, actor and critic

- Born: 21 September 1885; York, England
- Died: 10 August 1939 (aged 53)
- Education: Pembroke College, Cambridge
- Spouse: Constance Leetham Terry
- Children: 2 daughters, 2 sons
- Writing career
- Period: 1908–1930
- Genres: comedy; spy; detective; drama
- Notable works: The Man Who Stayed at Home (1914); General Post (1917)

Joseph Edward Harold Terry (1885–1939) was an English novelist, playwright, actor and critic who was born in York. He was a nephew of the actor Eille Norwood. and a grandson of Sir Joseph Terry. and became famous for writing two of the longest running plays of the First World War era, The Man Who Stayed at Home (1914) and General Post (1917), which both ran for more than 500 performances.

== Early career ==
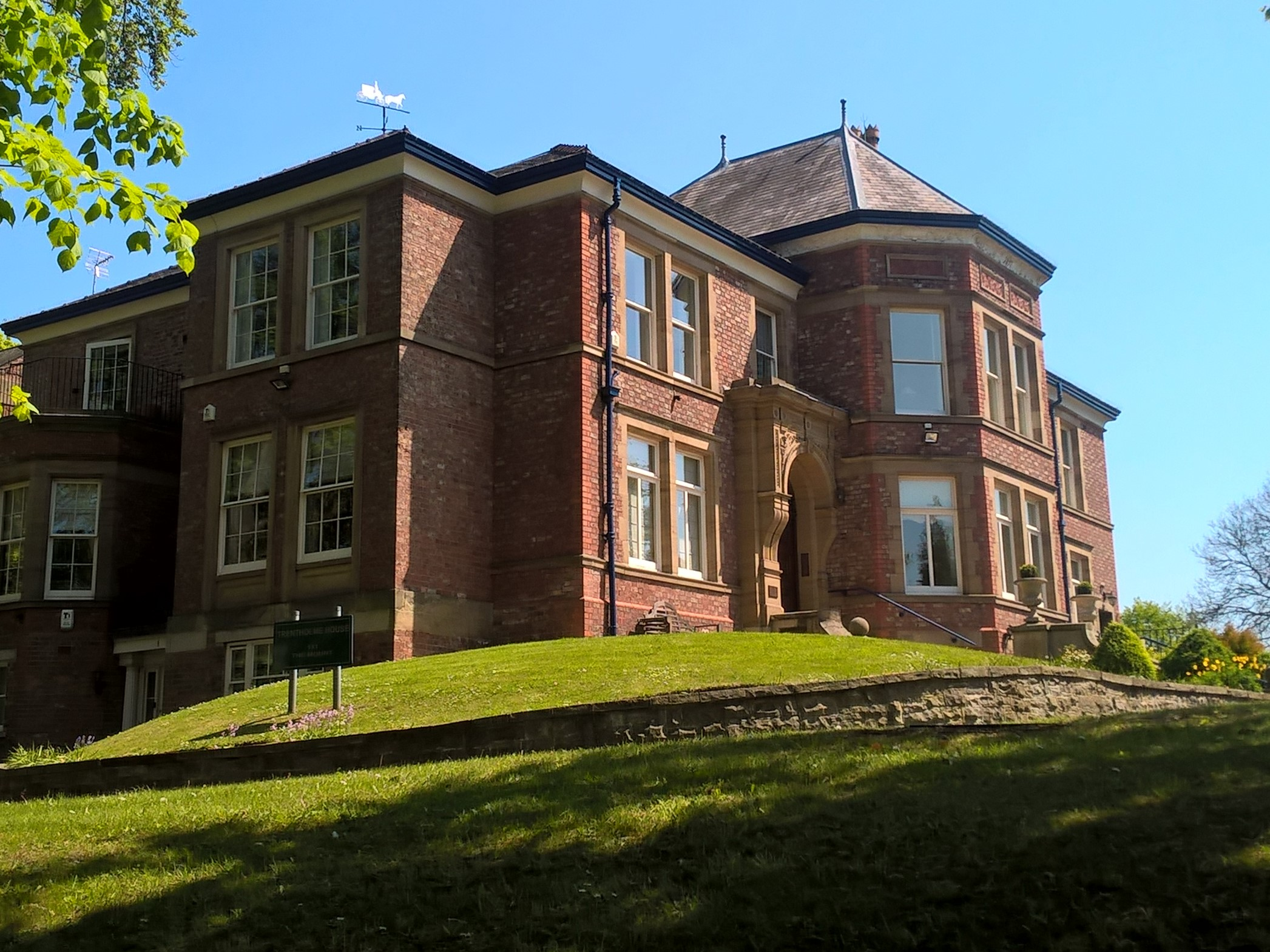
Trentholme House, York, was the family home where Terry was living when he wrote A Fool to Fame

Terry was educated at Marlborough College and Pembroke College, Cambridge where he was stage-manager of the Footlights club. While at Cambridge he was editor of The Granta but left in 1906 to take up a position with the Daily Mirror before becoming a dramatic critic for The British Review and The Onlooker, for which he was also the editor. His first play Old Rowley, The King (1908) is believed to have been lost. In September 1908 he became a Freeman of the City of York.

Terry took a number of amateur acting roles in the years after leaving Cambridge, most notably playing King Harold at the Battle of Stamford Bridge in the York Historic Pageant of 1909, a production that he had helped Louis N. Parker to write. The Yorkshire Herald then commissioned Terry to write a serial story for the newspaper which was in 1912 published as the novel A Fool to Fame. The novel was set in England during the period of the Commonwealth and Restoration and included an appendix of Terry's research. Although this historical romance about the highwayman John Nevison received positive reviews he would become best known for his patriotic wartime plays that emphasised the resourcefulness and courage of ordinary civilians and the impact of war on social conventions. In 1914 Terry, who was by this time living in the Covent Garden area of London, signed up with the Artists Rifles but he was invalided out soon afterwards.

== Wartime plays ==
The Man Who Stayed at Home, a play written by Terry and Lechmere Worrall, (Note: Pseudonym of Lechmere Worrall Clark (1875–1957)) was first performed in 1914 where it ran for 584 performances in London and was regarded as being "the most popular spy play of the 1914–1915 season". It was also performed on Broadway at the Comedy Theatre initially under the title The White Feather in early 1915 and then again in 1918 under the original title. The plot follows a British agent in his efforts to uncover a group of German fifth columnists, a popular theme that played on the fears of the British public at the time and was the subject of several classic works of the period, for example the spy novels of John Buchan. In 1915 the first film adaptation of The Man Who Stayed at Home was released along with a book version of play. In June 1915 it became the first major war-themed drama to be performed in Melbourne, Australia and when performed in New Zealand that August it was well received and attended by the Prime Minister William Massey. This was soon followed by the Australian film Within Our Gates (1915), considered to have been heavily influenced by the play, and another film version of the play released in 1919.

These were followed by a film version of Terry's play General Post (1920) the stage version of which ran from March 1917 for 586 performances at the Haymarket Theatre and earned Terry commendation for being one of the first war dramatists to explore the social impact of war and the breakdown of class divisions, pre-empting the exploration of these themes in John Galsworthy's The Foundations (1917) Following on from his earlier work with Worrall, they wrote a sequel to The Man Who... in 1917, called The Man Who Went Abroad, although this proved to be less successful than the original. Terry also wrote two other plays during the war, April Fools in 1915 and the musical Master Wayfarer which premiered at the London Apollo in December 1917 and featured songs by Arthur Scott Craven and music by Howard Carr.

== Later career ==
Terry was a member of both the Garrick Club and the Savage Club and between 1919 and 1922 was the Honorary Secretary of the Dramatists Club. He had also moved to live in Northwood, Middlesex (now in London). In 1921 Terry took to the stage again, acting in performances of his new play The Fulfilling of the Law and in 1922 he worked with Rafael Sabatini to write The Rattlesnake, a play re-titled in America as The Carolinian, which Sabatini later re-wrote as a novel and dedicated it to Terry. In 1923 he co-wrote the play The Return of Sherlock Holmes with Arthur Rose, a performance of which was attended by Arthur Conan Doyle, who praised both the writers and the lead performer Eille Norwood, who had by this time become famous for his portrayals of Holmes. The play ran for 130 performances at the Princes Theatre, London, before going on tour in the UK. It was also produced at the Grand Theatre, Amsterdam (1924), and the Sonderborg Theatre, Copenhagen (1926). In 1930, it was revived at the Regent Theatre, London, for 24 performances.

In 1924 Terry wrote Collusion a play that was made into the film Midnight Lovers in 1926, by which time Terry had moved to Luccombe Hill, Shanklin, on the Isle of Wight, where he lived with his wife and four children until his death in 1939. In 1915 he had married Constance Leetham Terry, one of the first women admitted to The Physiological Society. Terry's final play was another collaborative effort in 1930, this time with Harry Tighe, with whom he translated a Dutch play, Dolly Hans by Jan Fabricus. It was renamed Insult and successfully ran for over five months at the Apollo Theatre. In 1935 Terry is listed in Who's Who as a director of Joseph Terry and Sons.

== Works ==
=== Books ===
- A Fool to Fame (1912)

=== Plays ===
- Old Rowley, the King (1908)
- A King's Ransom (1911)
- The Knight of the Garter (1913)
- The Man Who Stayed at Home (a.k.a. The White Feather) (1914, with Lechmere Worrall) (Film – 1915,1919)
- April Fools (1915)
- The Man Who Went Abroad (1917)
- General Post (1917) (Film – 1920)
- Master Wayfarer (1917, with Arthur Scott Craven and Howard Carr)
- The Fulfilling of the Law (1921)
- The Rattlesnake (a.k.a. The Carolinian) (1922, with Rafael Sabatini)
- The Return of Sherlock Holmes (1923, with Arthur Rose)
- Collusion (1924) (Film – 1926 (Midnight Lovers))
- Insult (1930, with Harry Tighe)
