= Account Rendered =

Account Rendered may refer to:

- Account Rendered (1932 film), a British crime film
- Account Rendered (1957 film), a British murder mystery
- Account Rendered, a 1911 novel by E. F. Benson
- Account Rendered (novel), a 1928 novel by Rosita Forbes
