= The Pointing Finger (1922 film) =

1922 film

The Pointing Finger is a 1922 British directed by George Ridgwell and starring Madge Stuart and Joseph Tozer. It was an adaptation of the novel The Pointing Finger (1907) by "Rita". It was remade as The Pointing Finger in 1933.

== Cast ==
- Milton Rosmer - Lord Rollestone / Earl Edensore
- Madge Stuart - Lady Susan Silchester
- Joseph Tozer - Captain Jasper Mallory
- Teddy Arundell - Danny O'Shea
- Irene Rooke - Lady Anne Silchester
- James English - Earl of Edensore
- Norma Whalley - Mrs. Ebury
- Gibb McLaughlin - The Monk
