= Leslie Howard Gordon =

British screenwriter and actor (1891–1950)

- Born: 7 October 1891; London, England
- Died: 1950 (aged 58); Barnet, Hertfordshire, England
- Occupations: Film director, Actor, Screenwriter
- Years active: 1912 – 1937 (film)

Leslie Howard Gordon (7 October 1891 – 1950) was a British screenwriter and actor of the silent and early sound film eras. He also directed three films in the 1930s including The Double Event (1934). He worked as a screenwriter for Stoll Pictures in the early 1920s, when the company was the largest studio in the country. He often worked with the director Sinclair Hill.

== Selected filmography ==
=== Director ===
- The House of Unrest (1931)
- Account Rendered (1932)
- The Double Event (1934)

=== Screenwriter ===
- All the World's a Stage (1917)
- The Prey of the Dragon (1921)
- The Woman with the Fan (1921)
- The Woman of His Dream (1921)
- The Tragedy of a Comic Song (1921)
- A Romance of Wastdale (1921)
- Gwyneth of the Welsh Hills (1921)
- The Fruitful Vine (1921)
- The Prey of the Dragon (1921)
- The River of Stars (1921)
- Frailty (1921)
- The Knave of Diamonds (1921)
- The Eleventh Hour (1921)
- Dick Turpin's Ride to York (1922)
- Tell Your Children (1922)
- Half a Truth (1922)
- Melody of Death (1922)
- Little Brother of God (1922)
- Belonging (1922)
- The Knight Errant (1922)
- Lamp in the Desert (1922)
- The Passionate Friends 1922)
- The Guns of Loos (1928)
- Dark Red Roses (1929)
- Such Is the Law (1930)
- Other People's Sins (1931)
- The House of Unrest (1931)
- The Great Gay Road (1931)
- Account Rendered (1932)
- The First Mrs. Fraser (1932)
- It's a Boy (1933)
- The Double Event (1934)
- Melody and Romance (1937)
- The Live Wire (1937)

=== Actor ===
- Peg Woffington (1912)
- All the World's a Stage (1917)

== Bibliography ==
- Low, Rachael. Filmmaking in 1930s Britain. George Allen & Unwin, 1985.
