= The Knight Errant =

The Knight Errant may refer to:

- Knight-errant, a figure of medieval chivalric romance literature.
- The Knight Errant (film), a 1922 British silent romance film
- The Knight Errant (painting), an 1870 painting by John Everett Millais
