= The Scourge (film) =

1922 film

- Directed by: Geoffrey Malins
- Written by: Rafael Sabatini (novel and screenplay)
- Produced by: Sam Hardy
- Starring: Madge Stuart; Joseph R. Tozer; William Stack
- Production company: Hardy Films
- Distributed by: Stoll Pictures
- Release date: December 1922
- Country: United Kingdom
- Languages: Silent; English intertitles

The Scourge is a 1922 British silent drama film directed by Geoffrey Malins and starring Madge Stuart, Joseph R. Tozer and William Stack. It is based on the novel Fortune's Fool by Rafael Sabatini, who also wrote the screenplay. It was made at Isleworth Studios for release by Stoll Pictures, the largest British film company of the era.

== Cast ==
- Madge Stuart as Sylvia Farquharson
- Joseph R. Tozer as Duke of Buckingham
- William Stack as Ned Holles
- Simeon Stuart as General Monk
- A. Harding Steerman as Rev. Sylvester
- Ruth Mackay as Mrs. Quin
- Frank Woolf as Tucker
- Fothringham Lysons as Bates

== Bibliography ==
- Goble, Alan. The Complete Index to Literary Sources in Film. Walter de Gruyter, 1999.
- Low, Rachael. The History of the British Film 1918-1929. George Allen & Unwin, 1971.
