= The Man Who Stayed at Home (play) =

- Written by: J. E. Harold Terry; Lechmere Worrall
- Characters: Christopher Brent (title character)
- Series: The Man Who Went Abroad (1917)
- Subject: WWI espionage
- Genre: Comedy Detective Thriller
- Setting: South-east England, 1914

Premiere
- Date: 10 December 1914
- Place: Royalty Theatre, London

The Man Who Stayed at Home is a play by J. E. Harold Terry and Lechmere Worrall. First performed in 1914, the play is set during the First World War and tells the story of a group of German spies in South East England and the British agent who thwarts their undercover operation. It ran for over a year and a half in London and became one of the longest running plays of the period. It was also performed in Australia and New Zealand, and in North America where it was known as The White Feather. There were two film versions of the play, the first in 1915 and the other in 1919.

== Plot ==
This three act play is set in a boarding house called the 'Wave Crest Hotel' on the English coast. Christopher Brent is ‘The Man who...’, a character viewed by other characters as lazy and cowardly for his refusal to enlist as a soldier. However it soon becomes clear to the audience that he is actually a British secret agent attempting to uncover a group of German spies, based in the hotel, who are sending information to Germany using a wireless machine hidden in the fireplace. The Examiner of Plays, George Street, described it as 'a really good play about spies, with possible people and incidents and without any foolish violence of language. The plot, as is usual with good detective stories and plays, is full of incident'.

== United Kingdom ==
Directed by Eille Norwood, the play ran for 584 performances in London between December 1914 and July 1916. This was initially at the Royalty Theatre before transferring to the Apollo for the final four months of its run. The theme of German spies in England played on the fears of the British public at the time leading to the Daily Mail describing it as: "more than a play of the moment; it is a play of the very second, pregnant with the insistence of a tremendous and nationally important question". Although some reviewers considered it to be an ordinary detective play made popular by it topical setting, other newspapers also gave the play more positive reviews and many of the London cast became notable for their work in films. Dennis Eadie and Jean Cadell both reprised their roles in the 1915 film version of the play. The success of the play led to a book version of the play being produced in 1915 and a sequel The Man who went Abroad in 1917.

== Australia and New Zealand ==
The Australian theatre company of J. C. Williamson Ltd (JCW) produced the play in Australia and New Zealand. The Australian premiere was at the Theatre Royal, Sydney on 1 May 1915 where its war theme gained particular relevance due to news of the Gallipoli landings which began less than a week earlier. In June 1915 it was the first major war-themed drama to be performed in Melbourne, Australia, where it ran for five weeks at the Theatre Royal. It then opened at the Wellington Opera House in New Zealand in August and was well received and attended by the Prime Minister William Massey. The play, which starred Frank Harvey in the title role, is considered to have been a major influence on the Australian film Within Our Gates (1915). Both were produced by JCW and the film was directed by Harvey, who acted in the film along with several other actors who had been in the play.

== North America ==
On Broadway the play opened at the Comedy Theatre in February 1915, initially under the title The White Feather for 140 performances which at one point were described as standing-room only It returned to Broadway in April 1918 under the original British title for a run of 109 performances at the 48th Street Theatre. The change in title was due to the fact that the writers had already sold the motion picture rights and the alternative title is a reference to an incident in the play where Brent is handed a white feather to signify his supposed cowardice.

The play toured Canada, being performed at the Princess Theatre, Montreal, in 1915 with a cast that included Grace Hampton and Wyndham Standing, and in Toronto at the Royal Alexandra, where in March 1916, it returned for a third time in less than a year.

== Cast of the Play ==
Role	London (Royalty)	London (Apollo)	Melbourne	Wellington
Christopher Brent	Dennis Eadie	Stanley Logan	Frank Harvey	Frank Harvey
Carl Sanderson	Malcolm Cherry	Frank Woolfe	Cyril Mackay	Austin Milroy
John Preston, J.P.	Hubert Harben	Sydney Paxton	Arthur Cornell	Arthur Cornell
Percival Pennicuik	Stanley Logan	P. Perceval Clark	Martin Lewis	Kenneth Brampton
Fritz	E. Henry Edwards	V Tarva Penna	Leslie Victor	Leslie Victor
Corporal Atkins	Campbell Gullan	Robert Taylor	-	Charles Morse
Mrs Sanderson	Mrs Robert Bough	Mrs Robert Bough	Emma Temple	Emma Temple
Miriam Leigh	Ruth Mackay	Ruth Mackay	Violet Paget	Violet Paget
Molly Preston	Isobel Elsom	Stella Jesse	Lizette Parkes	Dorothy Cumming
Miss Myrtle	Jaen Cadell	Edith Evans	Tempe Pigott	Tempe Pigott
Fraulein Schroeder	Mary Jerrold	Esme Hubbard	Elly Maylon	Florence Gleeson
Daphne Kidlington	Elizabeth Risdon	Norah Balfour	Dorothy Cumming	Mattee Brown
