= Green Lane Cemetery, Farnham =

Cemetery in Surrey, England

Coordinates: 51.2005°N 0.8085°W

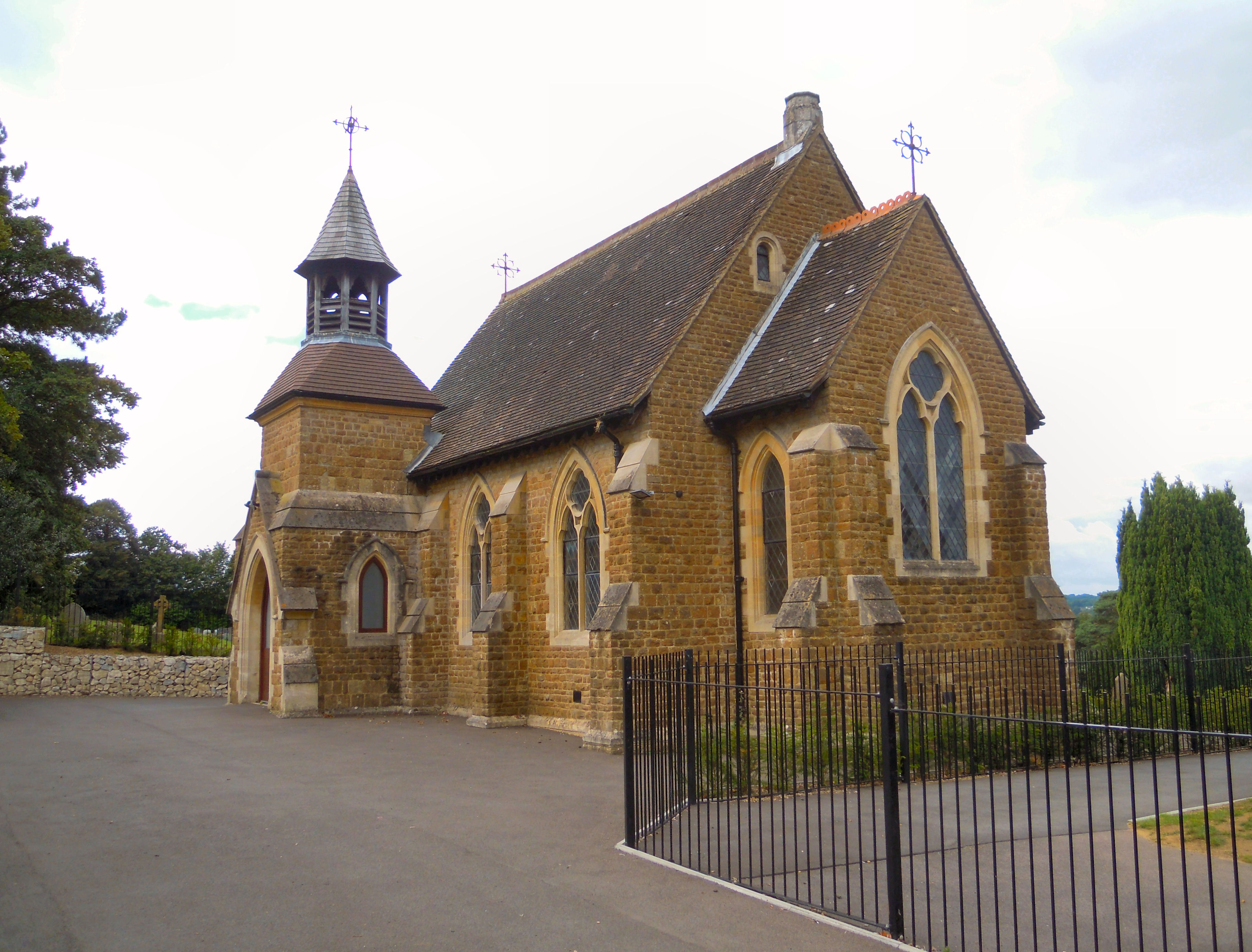
The former Cemetery chapel

Green Lane Cemetery is a small cemetery on Green Lane in Farnham in Surrey, one of four cemeteries owned and maintained by Farnham Town Council.

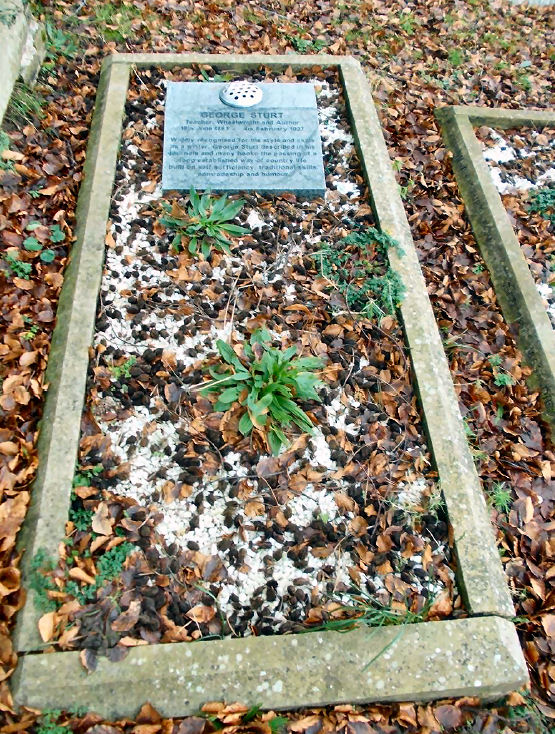
The grave of George Sturt in Green Lane Cemetery

In 1861, the local Burial Board received a request from the residents of Bourne for a burial area to be created next to the newly-built Green Lane Chapel. The Burial Board agreed to the request but it was a further 50 years before permission was finally given by Whitehall. The cemetery was designed by the architect Arthur J Stedman.

The Chapel and Cemetery were opened in 1914 and are on a hill which commands views across to the West of Farnham and Farnham Castle. The Chapel is built from Bargate stone, which came from Godalming with Bath stone dressings. The bell turret is oak. The Chapel could seat up to 80 people but had little use in recent years and was sold by Farnham Town Council for use as a Meeting House for the Plymouth Brethren Christian Church. The cemetery is divided into six sections allowing for the burial of different denominations; there is a small children's area and an area dedicated to the interment of cremated remains.

The cemetery has 13 military burials, two from World War I and eleven from World War II, the latter including two pilots – P/O Evelyn Creen Stuart Wilson-Steele of 219 Squadron (killed 1942) and Sgt Michael Henry John Kilburn. Kilburn joined the RAFVR aged 18 to train as a pilot and was completing his last two weeks of training when he was killed during a training flight in January 1942. He was initially buried along with the other seven members of his crew at Dyce Old Churchyard near Aberdeen. However, his family in Farnham must have applied to the RAF to have his remains returned to his home town and in 1943 he was reinterred in the plot here. Buried nearby is Lt Ernest Lyford of the Home Guard who was accidentally killed in 1943 aged 55 while training with bombs.

== Notable burials ==
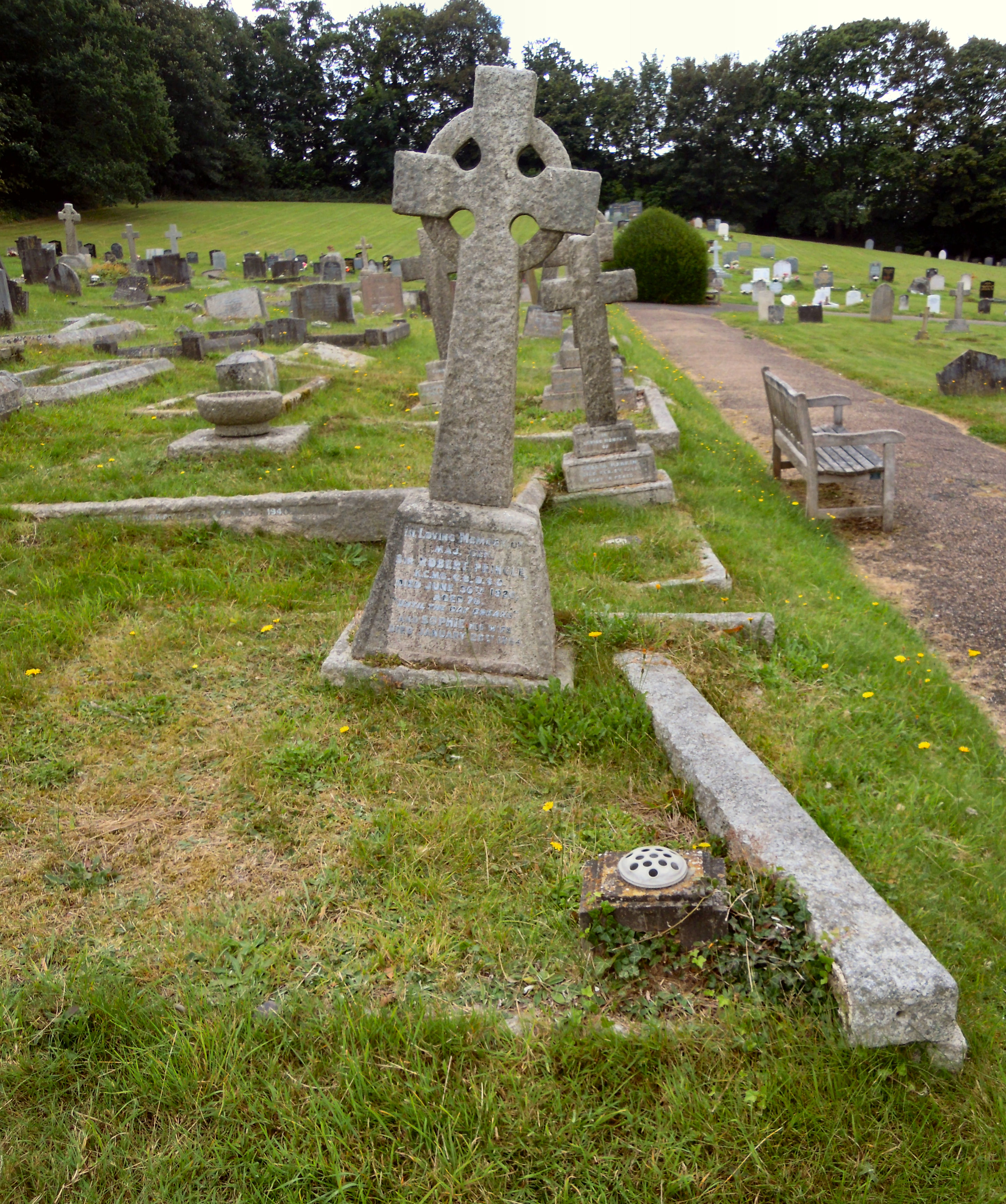
The grave of Sir Robert Pringle in Green Lane Cemetery

- Eille Norwood (1861–1948) actor known for playing Sherlock Holmes in a series of silent films.
- Sir Robert Pringle (1855–1925) Director-General of the Army Veterinary Corps 1910–1917
- George Sturt (1863–1927), English writer on rural crafts and affairs
