= A Gipsy Cavalier =

1922 film by J. Stuart Blackton

- Georges Carpentier and Flora le Breton
- Directed by: J. Stuart Blackton
- Written by: John Overton (novel); J. Stuart Blackton; Andrew Soutar
- Produced by: J. Stuart Blackton
- Starring: Georges Carpentier; Flora le Breton; Rex McDougall
- Cinematography: Nicholas Musuraca
- Production company: International Artists
- Distributed by: Gaumont British Distributors
- Release date: 20 September 1922
- Running time: 6,740 feet
- Country: United Kingdom
- Languages: Silent; English intertitles

A Gipsy Cavalier is a 1922 British historical drama film directed by J. Stuart Blackton and starring Georges Carpentier, Flora le Breton and Rex McDougall. It was one of three films made in Britain during the early 1920s by the British-born American founder of Vitagraph Studios. All involved elaborate sets, costumes and extras and set an example of showmanship to emerging British filmmakers. It was adapted from the novel My Lady April by John Overton.

== Cast ==
- Georges Carpentier as Valerius Carew
- Flora le Breton as Dorothy Forrest
- Rex McDougall as Ralph Carew
- Mary Clare as Janet
- Hubert Carter as Bartholomew Griggs
- William Luff as Beydach
- Simeon Stuart as Sir Julian Carew
- W.D.C. Knox as Sir George Forrest
- Norma Whalley as Lady Forrest
- Percy Standing as Stirrett
- Tom Coventry as Ballard
- Charles Stuart Blackton as Valerius as a Child
- Ursula Jeans as Extra

== Bibliography ==
- Low, Rachael (1971). History of the British Film, 1918-1929. George Allen & Unwin.
