= Betty Faire =

British actress

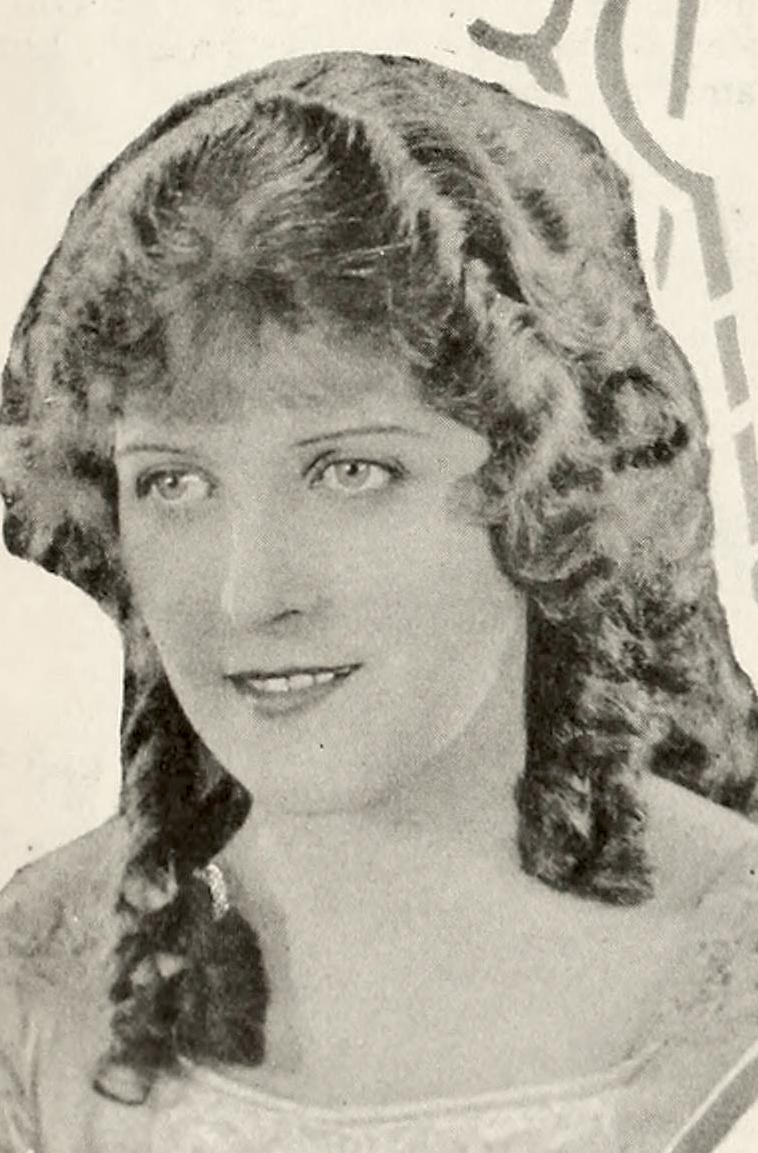
Betty Faire in 1925

Betty Faire was a British actress of the silent era.

== Selected filmography ==
- The Door That Has No Key (1921)
- Bentley's Conscience (1922)
- The Lonely Lady of Grosvenor Square (1922)
- The Loves of Mary, Queen of Scots (1923)
- Claude Duval (1924)
- The Gay Corinthian (1924)
- The Conspirators (1924)
- A Romance of Mayfair (1925)
- The Presumption of Stanley Hay, MP (1925)
- Bulldog Drummond's Third Round (1925)
- The Only Way (1927)
- The City of Youth (1928)
- The Man Who Changed His Name (1928)
- Cross Roads (1930)
