= A. Harding Steerman =

English actor (1863–1947)

Spotlight photo, 1939

A. Harding Steerman (21 November 1863 – 1947) was an English actor. He is sometimes credited as Harding Steerman.

He was born Alfred Harding Treeby Stalman in St Pancras, London and died in Plymouth, Devon.

== Selected filmography ==
- Iron Justice (1915)
- A Bid for Fortune (1917)
- The Elusive Pimpernel (1919)
- The Manchester Man (1920)
- Mr. Gilfil's Love Story (1920)
- Bleak House (1920)
- Beyond the Dreams of Avarice (1920)
- Love at the Wheel (1921)
- The God in the Garden (1921)
- The Corner Man (1921)
- The Old Curiosity Shop (1921)
- The Lilac Sunbonnet (1922)
- The Scourge (1922)
- Diana of the Crossways (1922)
- A Romance of Old Baghdad (1922)
- The Three Students (1923)
- Love, Life and Laughter (1923)
- Lights of London (1923)
- Motherland (1927)
- Other People's Sins (1931)
