= The House of Unrest =

1931 film

- Trade advertisement
- Directed by: Leslie Howard Gordon
- Written by: Leslie Howard Gordon (play and screenplay)
- Produced by: Seymour Hill
- Starring: Dorothy Boyd; Malcolm Keen; Tom Helmore
- Cinematography: Desmond Dickinson
- Production company: Associated Pictures Productions
- Distributed by: Producers Distributing Corporation
- Release date: March 1931
- Running time: 58 minutes
- Country: United Kingdom
- Language: English

The House of Unrest is a 1931 British mystery film directed by Leslie Howard Gordon and starring Dorothy Boyd, Malcolm Keen and Tom Helmore. It was written by Gordon from his stage play of the same name, and was made as a quota quickie at Cricklewood Studios.

== Preservation status ==
The British Film Institute National Archive holds a collection of stills but no film or video materials.

== Cast ==
- Dorothy Boyd as Diana
- Malcolm Keen as Hearne
- Tom Helmore as David
- Leslie Perrins as Cleaver
- Hubert Carter as Ben
- Mary Mayfren as Agnes

== Reception ==
Film Weekly wrote, "Unfortunately, this film cannot be recommended either as a thriller or as a mystery. Few of the scenes which are intended to excite achieve their purpose, and the identity of the mysterious criminal, around whom the plot turns, is never in doubt to normally perceptive persons."

Kine Weekly wrote, "Mechanical in its efforts to achieve mystification, and rather artifically acted."
