= Midnight Lovers (1926 film) =

1926 film

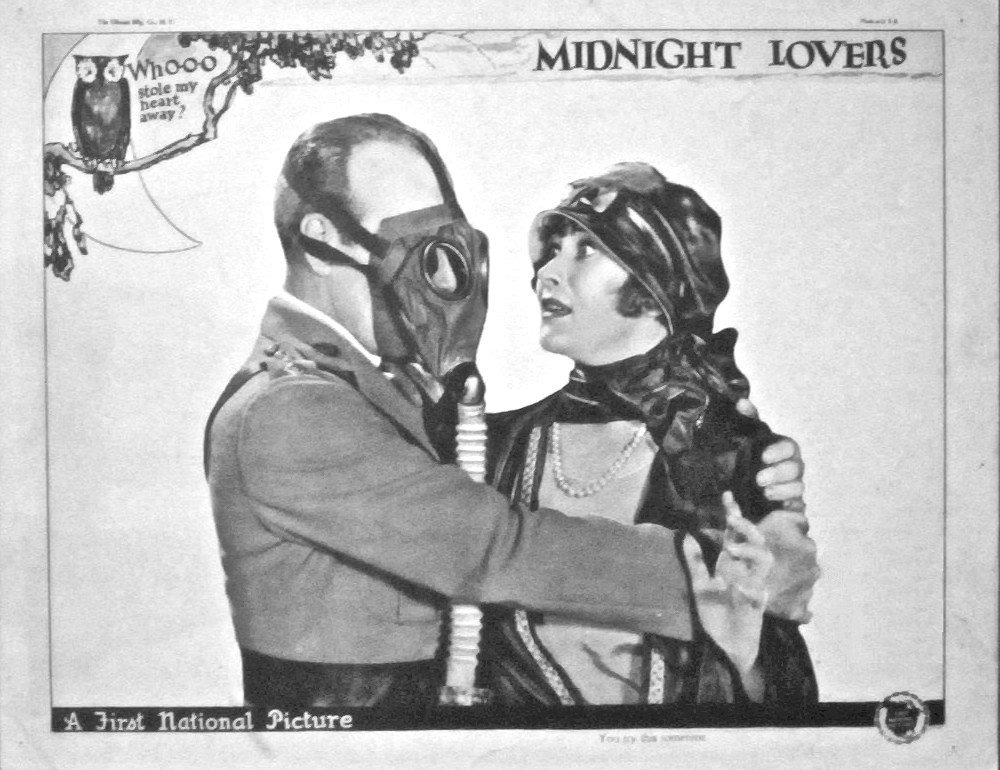
- Lobby card
- Directed by: John Francis Dillon
- Written by: Carey Wilson (story); George Marion, Jr. (intertitles)
- Based on: Collusion (play) by J. E. Harold Terry
- Produced by: John McCormick
- Starring: Lewis Stone; Anna Q. Nilsson
- Cinematography: James Van Trees
- Distributed by: First National Pictures
- Release date: October 25, 1926
- Running time: 70 minutes
- Country: United States
- Language: Silent (English intertitles)

Midnight Lovers is a 1926 American silent romantic war comedy film directed by John Francis Dillon and distributed by First National Pictures. It starred Lewis Stone and Anna Q. Nilsson. It was based on the play Collusion by J. E. Harold Terry.

Prints of the film are preserved at the Library of Congress and the Wisconsin Center for Film and Theater Research, Madison.

== Plot ==
As described in a film magazine review, because all the girls in her set married war heroes, and because William Ridgewell is a distinguished commander of aviation, Diana marries him. As soon as he has left for the front after a short honeymoon, during which she finds him to be a petrol-smelling, blunt-speeched aviator, she decides to divorce him. She intends marrying a man-about town as soon as the divorce takes effect. She writes her intentions to her husband, just as the armistice is signed. He hurries home and, because he loves her, agrees to arrange a desertion so she can get the divorce. On the fourteenth day, the last day for legan desertion, he becomes intoxicated. Reason leaves him and he returns home and goes to bed. In the morning when the other man appears Ridgewell throws him out. Diana, seeing her husband is really a desirable person, becomes reconsidered.

== Cast ==
- Lewis Stone as Major William Ridgewell, RFC
- Anna Q. Nilsson as Diana Fothergill
- John Roche as Owen Ffolliott
- Chester Conklin as Moriarty
- Dale Fuller as Heatley
- Purnell Pratt as Wibley
- Harvey Clark as Archer
