= The Only Way (1926 film) =

1926 film by Herbert Wilcox

- John Martin Harvey
- Directed by: Herbert Wilcox
- Written by: Charles Dickens (novel); Frederick Longbridge (play); Freeman Wills (play)
- Produced by: Herbert Wilcox
- Starring: John Martin Harvey; Madge Stuart; Betty Faire; Ben Webster
- Production company: Herbert Wilcox Productions
- Distributed by: First National-Pathé Pictures
- Release date: 6 February 1926
- Country: United Kingdom
- Language: English
- Budget: £24,000 or less than £20,000
- Box office: £53,000

The Only Way is a 1926 British drama film directed by Herbert Wilcox and starring John Martin Harvey, Madge Stuart and Betty Faire. It was adapted from the play The Only Way which was itself based on the 1859 novel A Tale of Two Cities by Charles Dickens. John Martin Harvey had been playing Carton in the play since 1899 and it was his most popular work. It cost £24,000 to make and was shot at Twickenham Studios. The film was a commercial success and reportedly took over £53,000 in its first two years on release. It was a particularly notable achievement given the collapse in British film production between the Slump of 1924 and the passage of the Cinematograph Films Act 1927 designed to support British film making.

== Synopsis ==
In the 1770s, France Doctor Manette is witness to the rape of a young woman (Jeanne Defarge) and the murder of her and brother (Jacques) by the powerful Marquis d'Evremonde. In order to silence Manette, d'Evremonde arranges to have him locked away in the infamous Bastille Prison, where he languishes for over a decade. Manette's young daughter is spirited out of the country by her guardian, the British banker Jarvis Lorry, to England, where she is brought up by Miss Pross. Ernest Defarge swears vengeance on d'Evremonde and will not rest until the entire family has been wiped out.

Many years later Doctor Manette is released. His time in the Bastille has left him institutionalised and he initially finds it hard to adjust to life outside the prison. Jarvis Lorry and Manette's now-grown daughter Lucy come to Paris to escort him to England. On the journey back they encounter a young man named Charles Darnay, the son of Marquis d'Evremonde, fleeing France because his liberal views clash with those of his father. Darnay and Lucy soon fall in love, but their hopes of marriage are threatened when Darnay is arrested on his arrival in England for espionage and high treason as an alleged French spy. Darnay's accuser is the unscrupulous Barsad, who is himself in the pay of the French government.

Darnay's defence case is worked on by an dissolute Englishman, Sidney Carton, whose young idealism has given way to a self-loathing cynicism. Carton bears a striking resemblance to Darnay and uses this in court to discredit Barsad's evidence in court, by raising doubts over Barsad's claims that he clearly saw and heard Darnay talking treason. Darnay is acquitted, and he plans to marry Lucy. Carton is befriended by Lucy, and developing an unrequited attachment for her, he tries to mend his ways and give up his heavy drinking.

In France, the oppression of the poor finally drives them to breaking point, and the French Revolution breaks out. Marquis d'Evremonde, who has been particularly exploitative of his tenants, is murdered in his bed by Ernest Defarge, and Charles Darnay inherits his title. Desperate to get their hands on the new aristocrat, Defarge and his colleagues trick Darnay into returning to France to assist an old faithful family servant who is now in trouble. Darnay is arrested and accused of being both an aristocrat and a British spy. Carton travels to Paris with Lucy, Lorry and others to try to help Darnay. He pleads Darnay's case and points out how liberal his views are and how he hated his father. He adds by pointing out that Darnay had been accused of treason in Britain and was hated there, to discredit the accusation of espionage.

Darnay is released, but Defarge is determined to wipe out the last of the d'Evremondes. He has Darnay re-arrested after producing an old letter written by Doctor Manette condemning all Evremondes, and this shifts the court against Darnay, who is sentenced to be executed by guillotine. Realising that Darnay is now facing almost certain death, Carton hatches an outlandish plan to switch places with him based on their facial similarities. He bribes his way into the prison, smuggles Darnay out and takes his place in the condemned cell. In sparing Darnay's life and securing Lucy's happiness, Carton is able to restore his long vanished sense of self-worth. The following day, while Lucy and Darnay escape safely from Paris, he goes to his death calmly and at peace with himself and the world.

The film, like the play, adds a character named Mimi who is a young waif who is rescued by Carton and works in his house. She becomes devoted to him and elects to die on the guillotine with him after killing Ernest Defarge in self-defence.

== Cast ==
- John Martin Harvey – Sydney Carton
- Madge Stuart – Mimi
- Betty Faire – Lucy Manette
- Ben Webster – Marquis d'Evremonde
- J. Fisher White – Manette
- Frederick Cooper – Darnay
- Mary Brough – Miss Pross
- Frank Stanmore – Jarvis Lorry
- Gibb McLaughlin – Barsad
- Gordon McLeod – Ernest Defarge
- Jean Jay – Jeanne Defarge
- Margaret Yarde – The Vengeance
- Judd Green – Prosecutor
- Fred Rains – President
- Jack Raymond – Jacques

== Production ==
Wilcox says he made the film after "a period of unimpressive films". He bought the rights to the play and had John Martin Harvey to reprise his stage role. "It was a unique experience, since Martin Harvey was the finest actor I had directed up to that time," wrote Wilcox.

The film reportedly went £5,000 over budget.

== Reception ==
Wilcox wrote "I was inundated with congratulations and praise for my direction. But, remembering the hard lesson of the praise lavished on The Wonderful Story [a critical success which had flopped] I took no risks and put all my knowledge of showmanship into presenting it." Wilcox arranged a gala premiere at the London Hippodrome.

The film later resulted in a lawsuit involving block booking.

== Bibliography ==
- Low, Rachel. The History of British Film: Volume IV, 1918–1929. Routledge, 1997.
- Wilcox, Herbert. Twenty Five Thousand Sunsets, 1967
