= The Woman Who Was Nothing =

1917 film by Maurice Elvey

The Woman Who Was Nothing is a 1917 British silent crime film directed by Maurice Elvey and starring Lilian Braithwaite, Madge Titheradge and George Tulley. It was based on a novel by Tom Gallon. The screenplay concerns a female ex-convict who steals the identity of a dying heiress.

== Cast ==
- Lilian Braithwaite - The Wife
- Madge Titheradge - Brenda
- George Tulley - Richard Marsden
- Leon M. Lion - Ferret
- Lyston Lyle - Financier
- Ruth Mackay - Duchess
- Douglas Munro - Chairman
- Marjorie Day - Hope Dacre
