= Joseph Grossman =

British film pioneer (1888–1949)

Joseph Grossman (10 October 1888 – 18 January 1949) was a pioneer of the British film industry, most famous as the charismatic Studio Manager of Elstree Studios. Born in Dartford, Kent, the son of Myer Grossman and Rosa Morris, who belonged to Jewish families originally from Germany and Poland, he was always known as "Joe" and was famous for his nervous twitches and his Cockney humour. Joe Grossman was a contemporary of Oscar Deutsch and Michael Balcon, both of whom lived near his grandparents in Birmingham. He is mentioned in Michael Balcon's autobiography.

Joe Grossman worked his whole life in the entertainment industry, first appearing on stage aged 4 in his father's theatre in Brentford, Middlesex. Joe and his identical twin brother, William, performed as a double-act and toured (as 'The Filberts') with magicians and illusionists Nevil Maskelyne and David Devant until the outbreak of war in 1914. (William is said to have died as an indirect result of copying Harry Houdini's famous illusion featuring an escape from a tank of water.)

After serving with distinction in the Royal Army Medical Corps during The Great War, Joe Grossman entered the film industry in 1920, when Oswald Stoll gave him the post of Studio Manager at the Stoll Studios at Surbiton and, a year later, at the new Studios at Cricklewood. (Joe married Oswald Stoll's secretary, Esther Josephs, in 1922.) In 1927, John Maxwell, manager of British International Pictures (later Associated British Picture Corporation), offered him the Studio Manager job at Elstree, where he remained until his death. During his time as studio manager at Elstree he was successful in engaging the interest of the Royal Family in the work of the studios. Both the future Edward VIII and the future George VI made private visits, and King George V and Queen Mary paid an official visit in 1934.

Joe Grossman worked with Alfred Hitchcock on his early films, including Blackmail, Britain's first talkie. Jamaica Inn (1939), St Martin’s Lane (1938) and Mimi (1935) were also made at Elstree during the period when Grossman was studio manager. He is credited as a screenwriter with The Guns of Loos (1928) and The Lady From the Sea (1929).

Joe Grossman was a Commander of the Order of St. John of Jerusalem and won many awards for meritorious service to the Order of St. John, the Fire Brigade (he was chief of the Elstree Fire Brigade) and the Royal National Life Boat Service.

== Sources ==
- P. Warren, Elstree, the British Hollywood (ISBN 0241109558), p. 90
- R. Low, History of British Film (ISBN 0415154510), p. 342
- K. Short, Hollywood's Overseas Campaign: The North Atlantic Movie Trade, 1920-1950, (ISBN 0521415667), p. 140
- A Tribute to Joe Grossman, “The A.B.C. News”, Vol. 2 No. 11, February, 1949
- J. Cardiff Magic Hour: The Life of a Cameraman (Faber and Faber, London, 1996), p. 36
