= Beyond the Dreams of Avarice =

1920 British film by Thomas Bentley

- Directed by: Thomas Bentley
- Written by: Walter Besant; William J. Elliott
- Starring: Henry Victor; Joyce Dearsley; Alban Atwood; Frank Stanmore
- Production company: Ideal Film Company
- Distributed by: Ideal Film Company
- Release date: 1920
- Country: United Kingdom

Beyond the Dreams of Avarice is a 1920 British silent drama film directed by Thomas Bentley and starring Henry Victor, Joyce Dearsley and Alban Atwood. It was based on the 1895 novel by Walter Besant.

== Cast ==
- Henry Victor as Dr. Lucien Calvert
- Joyce Dearsley as Margaret Calvert
- Alban Atwood as Sir Joseph Burnley
- Frank Stanmore as Alf Burnley
- Lionel d'Aragon as Bill Burnley
- Adelaide Grace as Old Lucy
- Jeff Barlow as James Calvert
- Howard Cochran as James Calvert
- A. Harding Steerman as Nicholson
