= The City of Youth =

1928 British film by E. H. Calvert

- Directed by: E. H. Calvert
- Written by: Muriel Alleyne; Oona Ball (novel)
- Starring: Betty Faire; Lilian Oldland; J. Fisher White
- Production company: British University Films
- Distributed by: British University Films
- Release date: March 1928
- Country: United Kingdom
- Languages: Silent; English intertitles

The City of Youth is a 1928 British silent drama film directed by E. H. Calvert and starring Betty Faire, Lilian Oldland and J. Fisher White.

== Cast ==
- Betty Faire as Barbara
- Lilian Oldland as Brownie
- J. Fisher White as Patrick Enderby
- Desmond Roberts

== Bibliography ==
- Wood, Linda. British Films, 1927-1939. British Film Institute, 1986.
