= Innocent (1921 film) =

1921 film

- Directed by: Maurice Elvey
- Written by: William J. Elliott
- Based on: Innocent by Marie Corelli
- Starring: Madge Stuart; Basil Rathbone; Edward O'Neill
- Production company: Stoll Pictures
- Distributed by: Stoll Pictures
- Release date: March 1921
- Country: United Kingdom
- Languages: Silent; English intertitles

Innocent is a 1921 British silent drama film directed by Maurice Elvey and starring Madge Stuart, Basil Rathbone and Edward O'Neill. The film marked the screen debut of Rathbone, with his casting as a villainous figure pointing towards the sort of roles he would play in later British and Hollywood films. The film was made by Stoll Pictures, Britain's leading film company of the era, at Cricklewood Studios.

== Synopsis ==
A naive country girl comes to the city, where she is seduced by a cynical artist.

== Cast ==
- Madge Stuart as Innocence
- Basil Rathbone as Amadis de Jocelyn
- Lawrence Anderson as Robin
- Edward O'Neill as Hugo de Jocelyn
- Frank Dane as Ned Langdon
- W. Cronin Wilson as Armitage
- Ruth Mackay as Lady Maude
- Mme. d'Esterre as Miss Leigh
- Annie Esmond as Housekeeper

== Bibliography ==
- Kabatchnik, Amnon. Sherlock Holmes on the Stage: A Chronological Encyclopedia of Plays Featuring the Great Detective. Scarecrow Press, 2008.
- Low, Rachael. The History of the British Film 1918-1929. George Allen & Unwin, 1971.
