= A Daughter of the Old South =

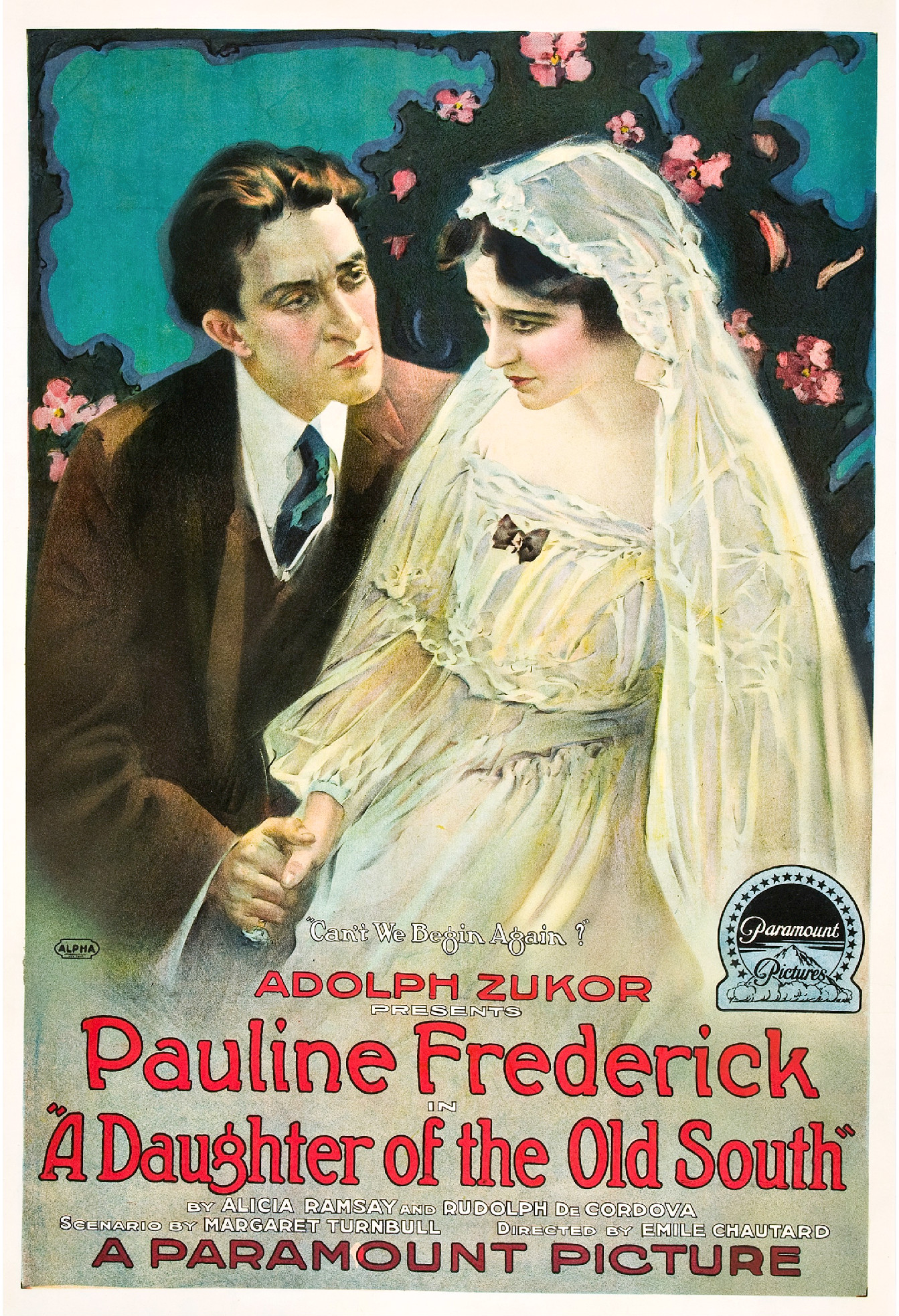
- Film poster
- Directed by: Émile Chautard
- Screenplay by: Alicia Ramsey; Rudolph de Cordova; Margaret Turnbull
- Produced by: Adolph Zukor
- Starring: Pauline Frederick; Pedro de Cordoba; Vera Beresford; Rex McDougall; Mrs. T. Randolph; Myra Brooks
- Cinematography: Jacques Bizeul (fr)
- Production company: Famous Players–Lasky Corporation
- Distributed by: Paramount Pictures
- Release date: November 24, 1918
- Running time: 50 minutes
- Country: United States
- Language: English

A Daughter of the Old South is a 1918 American drama silent film directed by Émile Chautard and written by Alicia Ramsey, Rudolph de Cordova and Margaret Turnbull. The film stars Pauline Frederick, Pedro de Cordoba, Vera Beresford, Rex McDougall, Mrs. T. Randolph and Myra Brooks. A premiere for the film was held at the Rialto Theatre in Manhattan on November 24, 1918. The film was distributed by Paramount Pictures.

== Cast ==
- Pauline Frederick as Dolores Jardine
- Pedro de Cordoba as Pedro de Alvarez
- Vera Beresford as Lillian Hetherington
- Rex McDougall as Richard Ferris
- Mrs. T. Randolph as Dolores' Grandmother
- Myra Brooks as The Housekeeper
- James Laffey as Mr. Hetherington

== Preservation ==
A Daughter of the Old South is currently presumed lost. In February 2021, the film was cited by the National Film Preservation Board on their Lost U.S. Silent Feature Films list.
