= Cross Roads (film) =

1930 British film by Reginald Fogwell

- Directed by: Reginald Fogwell
- Written by: Reginald Fogwell; A.E. Bundy
- Produced by: Reginald Fogwell
- Starring: Percy Marmont; Anne Grey; Betty Faire
- Production company: British Projects
- Distributed by: Paramount British Pictures
- Release date: August 1930
- Running time: 58 minutes
- Country: United Kingdom
- Language: English

Cross Roads is a 1930 British drama film directed by Reginald Fogwell and starring Percy Marmont, Anne Grey and Betty Faire. It was shot at Welwyn Studios as a quota quickie. It is a melodrama about a wife killing her unfaithful husband.

== Plot summary ==
The plot of this "Cross Roads" revolves around a wife who kills her unfaithful husband and tries to cover up the crime. Percy Marmont plays the role of the husband, while Anne Grey plays the role of the wife, and Betty Faire plays the role of a young woman who becomes involved in the crime.

The film explores themes of jealousy, betrayal, and murder and features suspenseful elements as the wife tries to cover up her crime and avoid getting caught by the authorities. The film was shot at Welwyn Studios, which was a major film production studio in the UK during the 1920s and 1930s.

== Cast ==
- Percy Marmont as Jim Wyndham
- Anne Grey as Mary Wyndham
- Betty Faire as The Other Woman
- Langhorn Burton as The Lawyer
- Wilfred Shine as The father

== Bibliography ==
- Chibnall, Steve. Quota Quickies: The Birth of the British 'B' Film. British Film Institute, 2007.
- Low, Rachael. Filmmaking in 1930s Britain. George Allen & Unwin, 1985.
- Wood, Linda. British Films, 1927-1939. British Film Institute, 1986.
