= Ruth Mackay =

English actress (1878–1949)

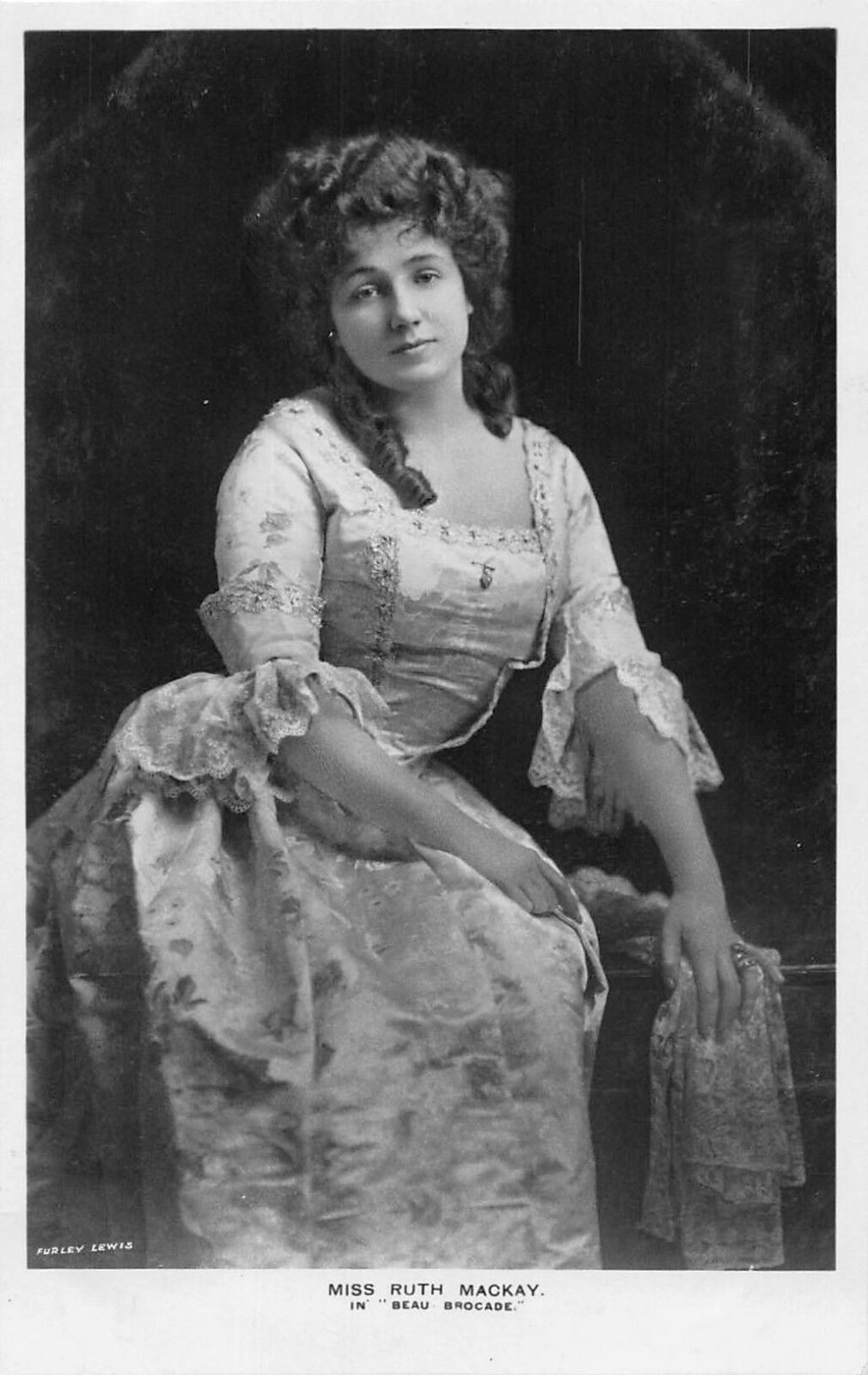
- Ruth Mackay in Beau Brocade (1908)
- Born: 9 May 1878; Kennington, London, United Kingdom
- Died: 31 March 1949 (aged 70); Canterbury, Kent, United Kingdom
- Occupation: Actress
- Years active: 1915 - 1922 (film)
- Spouse: Eille Norwood

Ruth Mackay (9 May 1878 – 31 March 1949) was a British stage and silent film actress. She was married to actor Eille Norwood.

She was born in Kennington in London in 1878, the daughter of David McDonald MacKay (1839–1910) and Florence née Dignam (1846–). Her daughter was Marjorie Florence Grahame - the actress Jane Grahame (1899–1981). In 1905 Mackay married the actor Eille Norwood; they were to remain together until his death.

In 1902 she toured Australia as Iras in Ben Hur. She was 'Carrots' in Resurrection (1903) with Herbert Beerbohm Tree and appeared in The Gordian Knot before travelling to New York to appear with Nat Goodwin in The Usurper at the Knickerbocker Theatre in 1904. In 1905 she was Potiphar's Wife in Joseph and His Brethren at the Coliseum in London. while in 1908 she was in Beau Brocade. She played the title role in Mrs. Warren's Profession (1913) at the Royalty Theatre, Glasgow, was Miriam Leigh in The Man Who Stayed at Home at the Royalty Theatre (1914) and was Mrs. Gordon Peel in The Luck of the Navy (1918) at the Queen's Theatre.

In her later years, she lived with her husband at Corner Cottage, Waverley Lane in Farnham in Surrey. Ruth Mackay Brett died in Westfields Nursing Home in Whitstable in Kent.

== Filmography ==
- Honeymoon for Three (1915)
- Esther (1916)
- East Is East (1916)
- Merely Mrs. Stubbs (1917)
- The Woman Who Was Nothing (1917)
- Goodbye (1918)
- No Children Wanted (1918)
- Duke's Son (1920)
- Testimony (1920)
- Innocent (1921)
- The Place of Honour (1921)
- The Scourge (1922)

== Bibliography ==
- Goble, Alan. The Complete Index to Literary Sources in Film. Walter de Gruyter, 1999.
