= Hubert Carter =

English stage and film actor (1869–1934)

- Born: 1869; Great Horton, Yorkshire, United Kingdom
- Died: 26 March 1934 (aged 64–65); London, United Kingdom
- Occupation: Actor
- Years active: 1913–31 (film)

Hubert Carter (1869–1934) was an English stage and film actor.

== Selected filmography ==
- Ivanhoe (1913)
- The Wonderful Year (1921)
- The House of Peril (1922)
- A Gipsy Cavalier (1922)
- The Game of Life (1922)
- Blinkeyes (1926)
- London (1926)
- The House of Unrest (1931)

== Bibliography ==
- Goble, Alan. The Complete Index to Literary Sources in Film. Walter de Gruyter, 1999.
