= Diana of the Crossways (film) =

1922 British film by Denison Clift

- Directed by: Denison Clift
- Written by: William Meredith; George Meredith (novel)
- Starring: Fay Compton; Henry Victor; Joseph Tozer; A. Harding Steerman
- Production company: Ideal Film Company
- Distributed by: Ideal Film Company
- Release date: April 1922
- Country: United Kingdom
- Language: English

Diana of the Crossways is a 1922 British silent drama film directed by Denison Clift and starring Fay Compton, Henry Victor and Joseph Tozer. It is an adaptation of the 1885 novel Diana of the Crossways by George Meredith.

== Plot ==
A sensuous woman trapped in a loveless marriage has an affair with a leading politician which threatens to bring down the government.

== Cast ==
- Fay Compton as Diana
- Henry Victor as Honourable Percy Dacier
- Joseph Tozer as Augustus Warwick
- A. Harding Steerman as Tonans
- J. Fisher White as Lord Dannisburgh
- Reginald Fox as Tom Rodworth
- Ivo Dawson as Sir Lukyne Dunstane
- Ernest A. Dagnall as Prime Minister
- Harvey Braban as Rodworth
- Joyce Gayman as Lady Emma
- Pamela Cooper as Princess
- Hope Tilden as May Paynham
