= Reginald Bach =

British actor (1886–1941)

Reginald Bach (3 September 1886 – 6 January 1941) was a British actor and theatrical producer.

== Early life and career ==
Born in Shepperton, Middlesex, England, Bach was educated at Dean Close School, in Cheltenham Spa, the family having moved to Leamington Spa. After leaving school lived in Cheltenham Spa, where he established a reputation as an amateur actor, making his professional debut in 1905. In 1926 Bach married Olive Thurston, daughter of writer E. Temple Thurston. She had acted in Bach's 1924 production of the Temple Thurston play Blue Peter. Bach took an active part in the actor's union Equity and served on the executive committee. At the outbreak of the Second World War, Bach moved to the US, where he acted in several plays. He died 6 January 1941 in New York City.

== Selected plays ==
- Damaged Goods (1917)
- Havoc (1923)
- 'Our Nell (1924)
- Blue Peter (1924) (producer)
- Death Sentence (1926)
- My Lady's Mill (1928)
- The Stranger Within (1929)
- Through A Window (1929) {producer/actor}
- Tunnel Trench (1929)
- Twelve Hours (1930) (producer)
- A Song of Sixpence (1930) (producer)
- The Scorpion (1930) (producer/actor)
- The Queen's Husband (1931)
- The Hound of the Baskervilles (1832)
- High Temperature (1833)
- The Bride (1934> (producer/actor)
- Treasure Island (1934) (producer/actor)

== Selected filmography ==
- The Chinese Puzzle (1919)
- Once Aboard the Lugger (1920)
- The Amazing Quest of Mr. Ernest Bliss (1920)
- Build Thy House (1920)
- The Will (1921)
- Empress Josephine; Or, Wife of a Demigod (1923)
- A Romance of Mayfair (1925)
- We Women (1925)
- The Girl in the Night (1931)
- Hobson's Choice (1931)
- Let Me Explain, Dear (1932)
- Account Rendered (1932)
- The Hound of the Baskervilles (1932)
- The Scoop (1934)
