= George Sturt =

English writer

Chalk drawing of George Sturt by W. H. Allen (1909)

George Sturt (18 June 1863 – 4 February 1927), who also wrote under the pseudonym George Bourne, was an English writer on rural crafts and affairs. He was born and grew up in Farnham, Surrey, the son of Ellen née Smith (1829–1890) and Francis Sturt (1822–1884).

He attended Farnham Grammar School and for a short period aged 15 years he was a pupil-teacher there, at one time having the ambition to be a sub-inspector of local schools. When his father died in 1884 he took over the administration of the family wheelwright business founded in 1706. During this time he also contributed as an assistant to the various craftsmen working in the business.

However, the work became either too onerous or he found his preference would be to spend more time writing so he took on a partner Eventually that partner died and his own ill health became a problem in 1916, so another partner was found who bought him out in 1920.

He wrote numerous books and articles under the name George Bourne, including a novel - his first published book - A Year's Exile (1898), which dealt with country life among the people of Surrey. Many of Sturt's later books, essays, and articles concerned the dealings of country people and their life and often included details of the practices and tools of the wheelwright and farmer. Among such books were The Bettesworth Book (1901), Change in the Village (1912), Lucy Bettesworth (1913), A Farmer's Life, with a Memoir of the Farmer's Sister (1922), and The Wheelwright's Shop (1923), often considered to be his best book. Sturt also wrote a book on aesthetics called The Ascending Effort (1910).

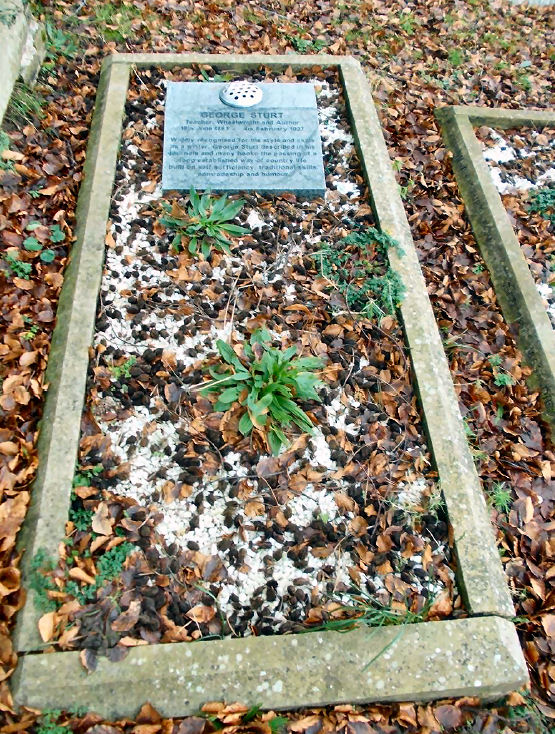
Sturt's restored grave in Green Lane Cemetery in Farnham, Surrey

George Sturt is buried in Green Lane Cemetery in Farnham, Surrey.

== Writing ==
It was in 1923 and close to the end of his life that he published his next-to-last book and best-known, The Wheelwright's Shop. The Times Literary Supplement praised the book for its "grace and power," noting that "It paints directly and without effort the temper and acquirements of a race of skilled workmen such as we are not likely to see again." Mortise & Tenon Magazine says the work, "has gained the deserved status of a classic" and describes it as "a timelessly important and enjoyable book." Sturt described it as "an autobiography for the years 1884 to 1891" but its continuing interest to its present and recent readership lies in the 170-plus pages describing the technology of late-Victorian cart woodwork.

It was after he took over his father's eponymous firm that he learned the technical processes and features of the technology making up the bulk of the book.

== Bibliography ==
- The Extinction Of The Keens, unpublished novel
- A Year's Exile (1898), his only published novel
- The Bettesworth Book: Talks with a Surrey Peasant (1901)
- Memoirs of a Surrey Labourer: A Record of the Last Years of Frederick Bettesworth (1907)
- The Ascending Effort (1910)
- Change in the Village (1912)
- Lucy Bettesworth (1913)
- William Smith, Potter and Farmer: 1790-1858 (1919)
- A Farmer's Life, with a Memoir of the Farmer's Sister (1922)
- The Wheelwright's Shop (1923)
- A Small Boy in the Sixties (1927)
- The Journals of George Sturt 1890-1902 (1941)
