= The Gay Corinthian =

1924 film

- Directed by: Arthur Rooke
- Written by: Ben Bolt (novel); Eliot Stannard
- Produced by: I.B. Davidson
- Starring: Victor McLaglen; Betty Faire; Cameron Carr
- Production company: I.B. Davidson
- Distributed by: Granger Films
- Release date: July 1924
- Country: United Kingdom
- Languages: Silent; English intertitles

The Gay Corinthian is a 1924 British silent historical drama film directed by Arthur Rooke and starring Victor McLaglen, Betty Faire and Cameron Carr. It was shot at Leyton Studios.

== Cast ==
- Victor McLaglen as Squire Hardcastle
- Betty Faire as Lady Carrie Fanshawe
- Cameron Carr as Lord Barrymore
- Humberston Wright as Sir Thomas Apreece
- Donald Macardle as Harry Fanshawe
- George Turner as Jeremy
- Guardsman Penwill as Flaming Tinman
- Noel Arnott as Gentleman Jeffries
- Jack Denton as Dr. Lee

== Bibliography ==
- Low, Rachael. History of the British Film, 1918-1929. George Allen & Unwin, 1971.
- Warren, Patricia. British Film Studios: An Illustrated History. Batsford, 2001.
