= Robert Pringle (British Army officer) =

Major-General Sir Robert Pringle KCMG CB DSO FRCVS
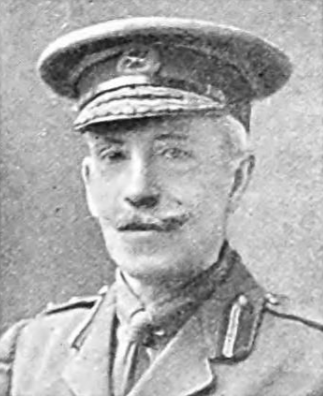
- Born: 25 August 1855
- Died: 30 June 1925 (aged 69)
- Alma mater: Glasgow College
- Spouse: Sophie Byres (m. 1899)
- Military career
- Allegiance: United Kingdom
- Branch: British Army
- Service years: 1878–1910
- Rank: Major-general
- Unit: Army Veterinary Corps
- Conflicts: Second Anglo-Afghan War; Second Boer War
- Awards: Mentioned in dispatches x 2

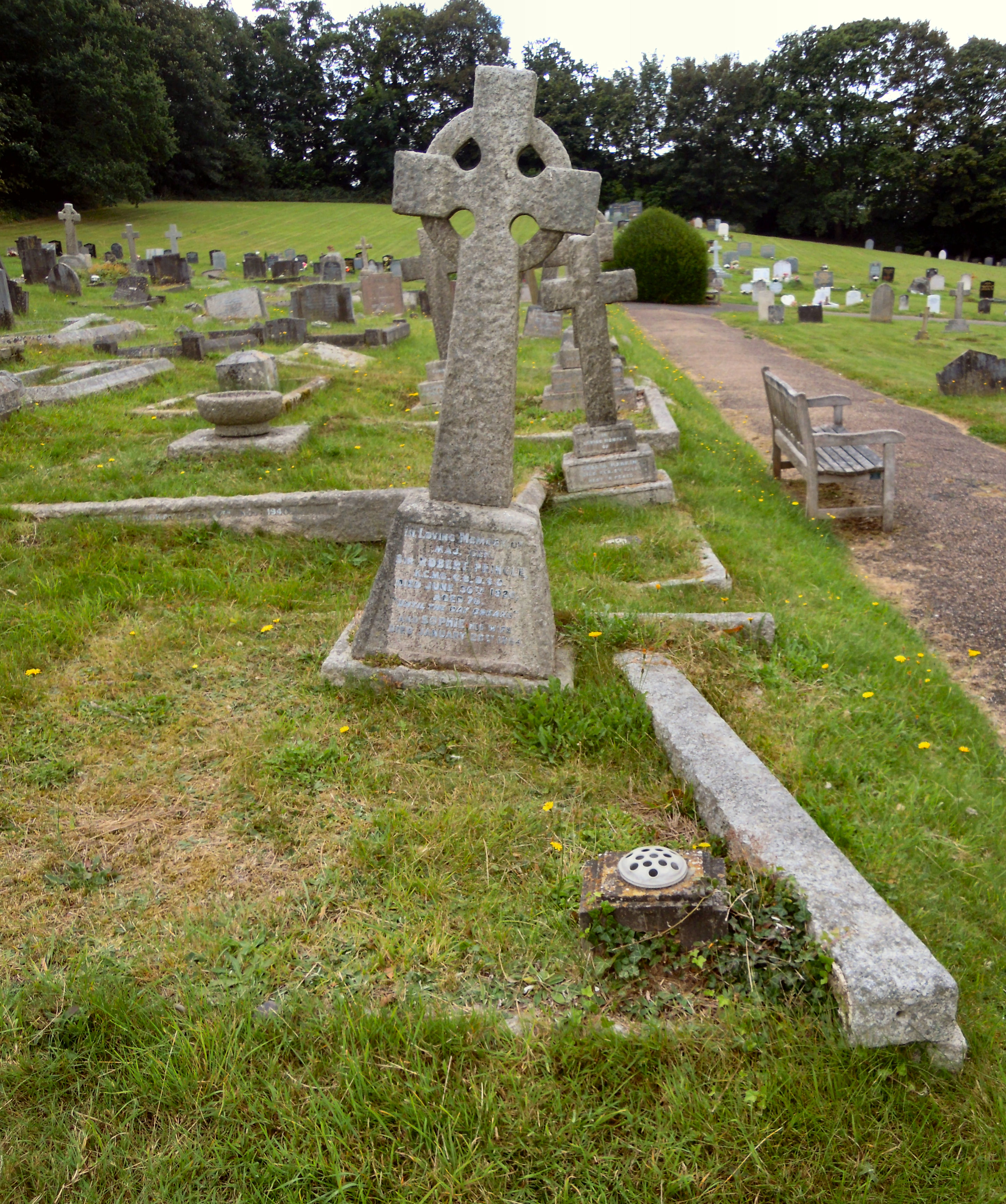
The grave of Major-General Sir Robert Pringle in Green Lane Cemetery in Farnham in Surrey

Major-General Sir Robert Pringle KCMG CB DSO FRCVS (25 August 1855 – 30 June 1925) was Director-General of the Army Veterinary Service from 1910 to 1917.

Pringle was born in 1855, the son of Mary née McCulloch (1819–1902) and Gilbert Pringle (1818–1897), a master blacksmith of Stranraer in Scotland and attended Glasgow College. He joined the Army Veterinary Department of the British Army in October 1878 and served during the Afghan War and in the Mahsud–Waziri Expedition of 1881 (where he was mentioned in despatches), and in the Zhob Valley Expedition of 1884. He was Principal Veterinary Officer of the 3rd Army from December 1901 to February 1903, serving in the Boer War of 1899-1902 as Senior Veterinary Officer. He was again mentioned in despatches and was appointed DSO.

Pringle became Principal Veterinary Officer and Lieutenant-Colonel on 11 December 1901 and was Inspecting Veterinary Officer in India from March 1903 to May 1907, serving on the North West Frontier. He was promoted to Colonel in December 1906. Pringle was Principal Veterinary Officer at Aldershot Command from February 1908 to October 1910 and was created a CB in 1909. He was Director-General of the Army Veterinary Service from 1910 to 1917 and was in that post when World War I broke out. It was through him that the conditions for wounded horses were improved with evacuation stations and motor horse ambulances introduced. He left the War Office in 1917 retiring with the honorary rank of Major-General. Pringle was created KCMG in 1917.

Pringle was a keen sportsman, playing racquets and polo and riding to hounds. In 1898 he married Sophie Moir-Byres (1872-1964), the eldest daughter of George Moir-Byres, of Tonley. They are buried in Green Lane Cemetery in Farnham in Surrey.
