= Joseph Tozer =

British actor (1881–1955)

Joseph Rose Tozer (1881 in Birmingham, Warwickshire – 1955) was a British actor.

== Musical theatre ==
- Houp La! (1916)

== Partial filmography ==
- The Brass Bottle (1914)
- A Park Lane Scandal (1915)
- The Answer (1916)
- The Merchant of Venice (1916)
- Burnt Wings (1916)
- Bars of Iron (1920)
- The Old Wives' Tale (1921)
- Gwyneth of the Welsh Hills (1921)
- The Scourge (1922)
- The Sporting Instinct (1922)
- The Pointing Finger (1922)
- The Greek Interpreter (1922)
- Diana of the Crossways (1922)
- The Passionate Adventure (1924)
- Zero (1928)
- Afterwards (1928)
- Cardinal Richelieu (1935)
- Clive of India (1935)
- Anna Karenina (1935)
- The Lady Escapes (1937)
