= Norma Whalley =

Australian actress (1882–1883)

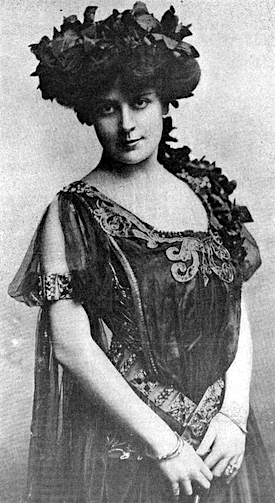
- On the cover of Broadcast Weekly, 8 September 1905
- Born: 1882 or 1883; Sydney, New South Wales, Australia
- Died: 9 October 1954 (aged 71–72); Westminster, London, England
- Other name: Lady Clarke
- Occupation: Actor
- Spouses: Charles Verner; James Sheridan Mathews (m. 1901; div. 1904) Percival Clarke (m. 1904; died 1936)
- Parent(s): Henry Whalley; Mary Rayson

Norma Whalley (1882 or 1883 – 9 October 1954) was an Australian theatre and film actress active in the United States and Britain.

== Biography ==
Whalley was born in Sydney in 1882 or 1883, the daughter of doctor Henry Octavius Whalley.

During the late 1890s she toured South Africa, meeting Paul Kruger, president of the Transvaal Republic soon after the Jameson Raid.

In 1901 she was married to J. Sherrie Matthews, an American vaudeville performer, who since mid-1900 had been prevented from working due to ill health, and by 1902 was permanently disabled after a stroke of paralysis.

In 1904 she divorced Matthews to marry barrister Percival Clarke (1872–1936), later Sir Percival, son of Sir Edward Clarke. Percival Clarke was portrayed by David Buck in the 1980s Granada Television series Lady Killers.

She died at Grosvenor Square on 9 October 1954.

== Acting career ==
=== Theatre ===
Whalley was brought to the United States for a production by George Edwardes.

She worked in the Chicago and New York for several years from the late 1890s. Whalley appeared in the Broadway production of The Man in the Moon between April and November 1899.

== Selected filmography ==
- Mr. Gilfil's Love Story (1920)
- Colonel Newcombe, the Perfect Gentleman (1920)
- Greatheart (1921)
- The Mystery of Mr. Bernard Brown (1921)
- Open Country (1922)
- The Pointing Finger (1922)
- The Pauper Millionaire (1922)
- Half a Truth (1922)
- The Crimson Circle (1922)
- A Gipsy Cavalier (1922)
- The Knight Errant (1922)
- The Experiment (1922)
- Sliver Blaze (1923)
- The Virgin Queen (1923)
- The Luck of the Navy (1927)
- Bitter Sweet (1933)
- This Is the Life (1933)
- The Camels Are Coming (1934)
