= Innocent: Her Fancy and His Fact =

1921 novel

- First edition
- Author: Marie Corelli
- Language: English
- Subject: Mistreatment of illegitimate children
- Genre: Victorian novel
- Publisher: Hodder & Stoughton
- Publication date: 1914
- Publication place: United Kingdom

Innocent: Her Fancy and His Fact is a 1914 English novel by Marie Corelli. Its theme is the mistreatment of illegitimate children. It also contains several proto-feminist polemics against marriage. it was adapted into the 1921 silent film Innocent.

== Plot ==
Raised on the prosperous farm of Hugo Jocelyn, descendant of a French knight, Innocent has always believed herself to be Jocelyn's illegitimate daughter by his fiancee before her death. She is an idealistic woman, inspired by the romanticism of the medieval French literature preserved by her ancestor; indeed, she feels she knows "Sieur Amadis" personally.

As an infant, Innocent was dumped at the farm during a violent storm, by a stranger who explained he had to keep going but feared endangering the child. He promised to return, but never did, instead sending money every six months. Jocelyn reveals this in a deathbed confession.

After his death, Innocent receives a visit from her birth mother, Lady Blythe. A shallow and pretentious noblewoman, she explains that Innocent was the result of a fling she had with artist Pierce Armitage. He was probably the one who left her at the farm.

Innocent departs for London, planning to earn her living by writing and "make a name" for herself, since she has none by birthright. She has one book already written; it is wildly successful, and she writes another. In the usual Corellian coincidences, Innocent's landlady had had a serious relationship with Pierce Armitage, and Lord Blythe had been his friend at school. Lady Blythe confesses all, then dies. In Italy, Lord Blythe discovers Armitage alive and tells him of Innocent; Armitage at once prepares to claim his daughter legally.

However, Innocent has been lured into a romance with a modern-day Amadis Jocelyn, descendant of her "Sieur Amadis"' brother. She mistakes his flirtations and romantic gestures for real love, but he thinks of it as a mere fling. When he casts her out, Innocent is heartbroken, and returns to her farm to die.

== Reception ==
The New York Times called Innocent "the kind of book once beloved by the romantic and unsophisticated schoolgirl." William Robertson Nicoll endorsed the book as "A beautiful and tender love story.... With consummate skill the whole heart of a woman is shown us.... Innocent is one of the heroines that will never be forgotten."
