= The Prey of the Dragon =

1921 film

- Directed by: Floyd Martin Thornton
- Written by: Ethel M. Dell (short story); Leslie Howard Gordon
- Production company: Stoll Pictures
- Distributed by: Stoll Pictures
- Release date: September 1921
- Country: United Kingdom
- Languages: Silent; English intertitles

The Prey of the Dragon is a 1921 British silent adventure film directed by F. Martin Thornton and starring Harvey Braban, Gladys Jennings and Hal Martin. It was based on a short story by Ethel M. Dell.

== Cast ==
- Harvey Braban as Robin Wentworth
- Gladys Jennings as Sybil Dehan
- Hal Martin as Jim Curtis
- Victor McLaglen as Brett 'Dragon' Mercer

== Bibliography ==
- Goble, Alan. The Complete Index to Literary Sources in Film. Walter de Gruyter, 1999.
