= Within Our Gates (1915 film) =

- Directed by: Frank Harvey
- Written by: W. J. Lincoln; Frank Harvey; Monte Luke
- Based on: The Man Who Stayed at Home by J. E. Harold Terry and Lechmore Worrall
- Starring: Cyril Mackay; Frank Harvey
- Cinematography: Monte Luke; Maurice Bertel
- Production company: J. C. Williamson Ltd
- Release date: 19 July 1915
- Running time: 3,000 feet or 5,000 feel (75 mins)
- Country: Australia
- Languages: Silent; English intertitles

Within Our Gates, also known as Deeds that Won Gallipoli, is a 1915 Australian silent film about Australia's fight with the German Empire and the Ottoman Empire during World War I, including the landing at Gaba Tepe during the Gallipoli campaign. The story was partly based on a play The Man Who Stayed at Home.

It is considered a lost film.

== Plot ==
Max Huitzell (Leslie Victor), a German-American clerk in the War Office, is being blackmailed by a German spy (Norman Easty), transmitting information by wireless from his attic. The spy's adopted daughter Freda (Dorothy Cumming) falls in love with Edgar (Cyril Mackay), the son of the War Minister (John Ralston), and exposes her stepfather. Max and Edgar both enlist and meet in the Gallipoli campaign, where Max gives his life to save Edgar.

== Cast ==
Adelaide Express 28 July 1915

- Cyril Mackay as Edgar Ferguson
- Leslie Victor as Max Huitzell
- Frank Harvey as Carl Heine
- Norman Estey as Heinrich Henschell
- John Ralston as Andrew Ferguson
- Dorothy Cumming as Freda Henschell
- Raymond Lawrence
- Charles Morse
- Frank East

== Development ==
This was the first original feature film from the theatrical company J. C. Williamson Ltd. They had become concerned with reports of American films being made from plays which they were producing in Australia, and decided to move into film production themselves.

They bought the studios of Lincoln-Cass Films in Melbourne and hired two of its staff, Maurice Bertel and W. J. Lincoln. After making two play adaptations, Williamson then decided to produce original stories, starting with Within Our Gates.

Although it was the third movie they made, it was the first of their movies to be released.

== Production ==
The cast were drawn from J. C. Williamson Ltd's theatrical stock company, many of whom appeared in a production of the play The Man Who Stayed at Home, on which the script was partly based. The director was English actor Frank Harvey, who moved to Australia in 1914.

W. J. Lincoln later claimed making the film was his idea.

The landing at Gaba Tepe was staged near Obelisk Bay near Sydney. Other location work was shot in Melbourne, and some interiors done at Melbourne's JCW Studio.

== Reception ==
Reviews were very positive and the film was a popular success at the box office.

The Motion Picture News called it "a really good war story, which is exceptional... Frank Harvey... deserves all the credit that can be given him for making such an interesting picture."

The Lone Hand said it "must be placed amongst the best Australian achievements" and Lincoln "succeeded in producing a strong story of German intrigue and cunning, of patriot-ism and valor all happening within our gates."

The Bulletin called it "a laudable attempt to stimulate recruiting" where "the melodrama, devised by W. J. Lincoln, introduces a lot of military spectacle, and the storming of the Gallipoli cliffs tickled up the soldier section of the audience when the film was submitted to private view at Her Majesty’s (Melb.)." Another review in the same magazine called it, "A trifle deliberate in the development of the story, perhaps, but a good, stirring sample of what Australia can do in this line."
