= Other People's Sins =

1931 film

- Theatrical_release_poster
- Directed by: Sinclair Hill
- Written by: Leslie Howard Gordon
- Produced by: Sinclair Hill
- Starring: Horace Hodges; Stewart Rome; Anne Grey; Arthur Margetson
- Cinematography: Desmond Dickinson
- Production company: Associated Pictures Productions
- Distributed by: Producers Distributing Corporation
- Release date: October 1931
- Running time: 63 minutes
- Country: United Kingdom
- Language: English

Other People's Sins is a 1931 British crime film directed by Sinclair Hill and starring Horace Hodges, Stewart Rome and Anne Grey. It was written by Leslie Howard Gordon and made at Cricklewood Studios.

== Plot ==
Barrister Anthony Vernon defends his crooked father-in-law Carfax, who has taken the blame for a murder committed by his daughter Anne.

== Cast ==
- Horace Hodges as Carfax
- Stewart Rome as Anthony Vernon, Barrister
- Anne Grey as Anne Vernon
- Arthur Margetson as Bernard Barrington
- Adeline Hayden Coffin as Mrs. Vernon
- A. Harding Steerman as Prosecuting Counsel
- Clifton Boyne as juror
- Arthur Hambling as fireman
- Sam Wilkinson as actor
- Frederick Burtwell as Junior Counsel
- Russell T. Carr as the tragedian
- Arthur Hardy as Judge

== Reception ==
Film Weekly wrote: "Horace Hodges gives a really delightful study of the scheming Carfax. He spares nothing in detail to make the character consistent, yet he always succeeds in retaining the sympathy of the audience. It is one of the best performances yet seen in a British film. Apart from this, all the other players are extremely efficient, and the whole picture is cleverly handled."

The Daily Film Renter wrote: "Interesting Old Bailey murder trial drama, intelligently directed by Sinclair Hill. It is well staged, well acted, and well recorded, and the story, which has many highly dramatic moments and a clever twist at the end, keeps a firm hold on the attention."

Kine Weekly wrote: "An intelligent and gripping crime play which survives a rather slow opening and works up step by step to an arresting and masterly handled court scene, and then ends on an unexpected and popular note. Sinclair Hill has directed the picture with imagination and understanding, and is well served by a talented cast."
