= Desmond Dickinson =

British cinematographer (1902–1986)

Desmond Evelyn Otho Cockburn Dickinson B.S.C. (1902–1986) was a British cinematographer.

He was cinematographer on Such Is the Law (1930). He directed Detective Lloyd (1932), notable as Britain's only talkie serial. During World War II he made morale boosting documentaries. He was the cinematographer for Laurence Olivier's version of Hamlet (1948), for which Dickinson won the International Award for Best Cinematography at the 1948 Venice Film Festival.

== Selected filmography ==
- The King's Highway (1927)
- A Woman Redeemed (1927)
- Carry On (1927)
- The Guns of Loos (1928)
- Such Is the Law (1930)
- Other People's Sins (1931)
- The House of Unrest (1931)
- The Great Gay Road (1931)
- Account Rendered (1932)
- The Callbox Mystery (1932)
- Threads (1932)
- Here's George (1932)
- Dick Turpin (1933)
- Love's Old Sweet Song (1933)
- Romance in Rhythm (1934)
- A Real Bloke (1935)
- Cock o' the North (1935)
- Strictly Illegal (1935)
- Variety (1935)
- King of Hearts (1936)
- Stars on Parade (1936)
- The Small Man (1936)
- Sunshine Ahead (1936)
- Song of the Forge (1937)
- Holiday's End (1937)
- Calling All Crooks (1938)
- The Body Vanished (1939)
- Hamlet (1948)
- Madness of the Heart (1949)
- Morning Departure (1950)
- The Importance of Being Earnest (1952)
- Horrors of the Black Museum (1959)
- City of the Dead (Horror Hotel USA) 1960
- Murder Most Foul (1964)
- Murder Ahoy (1964)
- A Study in Terror (1965)
- The Alphabet Murders (1965)
- Crooks and Coronets (1969)
