= Harvey Braban =

British actor (1883–1943)

Braban as Florizel in a stage production of Shakespeare's The Winter's Tale, c. 1910

George William Chapman (19 May 1883 – 6 August 1943), known as Harvey Braban, was a British stage actor. He also appeared in films between 1920–1938.

Braban was born in Brighton, Sussex, to George Chapman and Anne Braban. He performed regularly in West End plays, and also occasionally on Broadway. From 1920 he began appearing in silent films made by the leading British studios Stoll Pictures and the Ideal Film Company. Braban played the Chief Inspector in Alfred Hitchcock's Blackmail (1929) and thereafter often portrayed policemen or other official figures of authority on screen. One of his final roles was that of the Victorian Prime Minister Lord Salisbury in the 1938 film Sixty Glorious Years.

He married actress Lilian Christine Smith in 1914. He died in 1943 in Sussex.

== Selected filmography ==
- The Prey of the Dragon (1921)
- The Yellow Claw (1921) - Gaston Max
- Gwyneth of the Welsh Hills (1921) - Gwylim Rhys
- The Prince and the Beggarmaid (1921) - King Hildred
- Shirley (1922) - Nunnally
- Bentley's Conscience (1922) - Richard Glym
- Man and His Kingdom (1922)
- Diana of the Crossways (1922) - Rodworth
- The Loves of Mary, Queen of Scots (1923) - Ruthven
- The Romany (1923)
- The Great Well (1924)
- A Girl of London (1925)
- Blackmail (1929)
- Alibi (1931) - Insp. Davis
- The Girl in the Night (1931)
- The Call Box Mystery (1932)
- Easy Money (1934)
- The Path of Glory (1934)
- Boomerang (1934)
- Bulldog Jack (1935)
- Keep Your Seats, Please (1936)
- Darby and Joan (1937)
- Thank Evans (1938)
- Sixty Glorious Years (1938)

== Bibliography ==
- Duncan, Paul. Alfred Hitchcock: Architect of Anxiety, 1899-1980. Taschen, 2003.
