= The Hound of the Baskervilles (1921 film) =

1921 film by Maurice Elvey

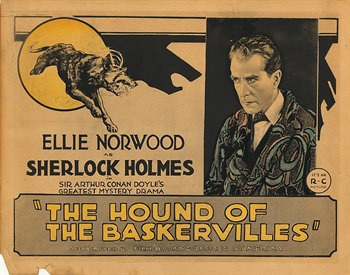
- Directed by: Maurice Elvey
- Written by: William J. Elliott; Dorothy Westlake
- Based on: The Hound of the Baskervilles; 1902 novel by Sir Arthur Conan Doyle
- Produced by: Jeffrey Bernerd
- Starring: Eille Norwood; Catina Campbell; Hubert Willis
- Cinematography: Germain Burger
- Production company: Stoll Pictures
- Distributed by: Stoll Pictures (UK); UFA (Germany); Robertson-Cole (US)
- Release date: 1921
- Running time: 5 reels; 5500 feet
- Country: United Kingdom
- Language: English

The Hound of the Baskervilles is a 1921 British silent mystery film directed by Maurice Elvey and starring Eille Norwood, Catina Campbell and Rex McDougall. It is based on the 1902 Sherlock Holmes novel The Hound of the Baskervilles by Arthur Conan Doyle. It was made by Stoll Pictures, Britain's largest film company at the time. It was the first British film adaptation of the famous novel.

== Plot ==
According to a local legend, Sir Henry Baskerville is slated to become the next in his family line to fall victim to a ghostly hound.

== Cast ==
- Eille Norwood as Sherlock Holmes
- Catina Campbell as Beryl Ducerne Stapleton
- Rex McDougall as Sir Henry Baskerville
- Lewis Gilbert as Roger Stapleton Baskerville
- Hubert Willis as Dr. Watson
- Allan Jeayes as Dr. James Mortimer
- Fred Raynham as Barrymore, the Butler
- Miss Walker as Mrs. Barrymore
- Madame d'Esterre as Mrs. Hudson
- Robert Vallis as Selden

== Production ==
Following the fifteen part The Adventures of Sherlock Holmes this was the first full-length film starring Eille Norwood as Holmes and Hubert Willis as Dr. Watson. It was the second film version of The Hound of the Baskervilles, following the 1914 German silent film Der Hund von Baskerville. Sometimes erroneously claimed to have filmed on Dartmoor, the film was actually shot near the village of Thursley.

== Release ==
The film was released in the United Kingdom on 8 August 1921 and didn't arrive in the United States for another 14 months, by which time the characters of Mr. and Mrs. Barrymore were renamed "Osborne". This was presumably done to avoid confusion with John Barrymore who starred in the film Sherlock Holmes, which was released the same year in the United States.

== Critical reception ==
Allmovie noted that the film sticks closely to the original story, but "doesn't even come close to the definitive 1939 talkie starring Basil Rathbone and Nigel Bruce -- for one thing, there are far too many title cards -- but it still has its moments, mostly involving moody shots of the moors."

Sir Arthur Conan Doyle himself enjoyed the film saying "Mr. Ellie Norwood, whose wonderful personification of Holmes has amazed me. On seeing him in The Hound of the Baskervilles, I thought I had never seen anything more masterly."

== See also ==
- Sherlock Holmes (Stoll film series)
