= The Double Event (1934 film) =

1934 British film by Leslie Howard Gordon

Double Event
- Sebastian Smith, Alexander Field, Ruth Taylor, Jane Baxter and O. B. Clarence in the film.
- Directed by: Leslie Howard Gordon
- Screenplay by: Sydney Blow
- Starring: Alexander Field; Jane Baxter; Ruth Taylor
- Cinematography: W. R. Crawshaw
- Edited by: A.C. Knott
- Production company: Riverside Studios
- Release date: 22 October 1934
- Running time: 68 minutes
- Country: United Kingdom
- Language: English

The Double Event is a 1934 British comedy film directed by Leslie Howard Gordon. It was written by Sydney Blow, and was made as a quota quickie. It marked the screen debut of Bernard Lee.

== Preservation status ==
The British Film Institute National Archive holds a collection of ephemera and stills but no film or video materials.

== Plot ==
To rescue his niece Evelyn from a dull life in her father's rectory, Uncle James sets her up as a bookmaker. Evelyn pretends the business belongs to her turf adviser Charlie Weir, and implies that he is her husband. Her ardent admirer John Dennison, unhappy that his prospective wife is a bookmaker, hatches a plot to ruin her business.

== Cast ==
- Jane Baxter as Evelyn Martingale
- Ruth Taylor as Aunt Laura
- O. B. Clarence as Reverend Martingale
- Alexander Field as Charlie Weir
- Bernard Lee as John Dennison
- Sebastian Smith as Uncle James

== Reception ==
Kine Weekly wrote: "Amusing well acted and intelligently directed, the film has a happy atmosphere and is thoroughly recommended for family halls and as a sound light addition in the average programme. ... Leslie Howard Gordon has a sound grip of his story, establishes every character clearly, and wastes no time in padding. Various situations are really very funny."

The Daily Film Renter wrote: "Naive situations, feeble dialogue, and stilted direction. ... Apart from some amusing comedy by that seasoned old trouper, O. B. Clarence, this film has little to recommend it. The idea of making the central character a woman bookie is quite good, but the plot degenerates into the conventional melange of misunderstandings so dear to near-farce."
