= Boomerang (1934 film) =

1934 British film by Arthur Maude

- Directed by: Arthur Maude
- Written by: John Paddy Carstairs; David Evans (play)
- Starring: Lester Matthews; Nora Swinburne; Harvey Braban
- Cinematography: Geoffrey Faithfull
- Production company: Maude Productions
- Distributed by: Columbia Pictures
- Release date: 1934
- Running time: 82 minutes
- Country: United Kingdom
- Language: English

Boomerang is a 1934 British drama film directed by Arthur Maude and starring Lester Matthews, Nora Swinburne, and Harvey Braban. It was written by John Paddy Carstairs based on the play by David Evans, and was made at Walton Studios.

== Preservation status ==
The British Film Institute National Archive holds no stills or ephemera, and no film or video materials.

== Synopsis ==
Elizabeth Stafford marries a blind man who, she later discovers, had earlier in her life seduced her at a masked ball.

== Cast ==
- Lester Matthews as David Kennedy
- Nora Swinburne as Elizabeth Stafford
- Harvey Braban
- Wallace Geoffrey
- Charles Mortimer
- Millicent Wolf

== Reception ==
The Daily Film Renter wrote: "Stagily presented, film possesses overmuch dialogue of a stilted pattern, while climax lacks strength. Main interest, however, vested in smooth portrayals by Lester Matthews, Nora Swinburne and Millicent Wolf, who make best of poor material. Quota fare for indulgent."
