= The Guns of Loos =

1928 film by Sinclair Hill

- Directed by: Sinclair Hill
- Written by: Reginald Fogwell; Leslie Howard Gordon; Joe Grossman; Sinclair Hill
- Produced by: Oswald Mitchell
- Starring: Henry Victor; Madeleine Carroll; Bobby Howes; Hermione Baddeley
- Cinematography: D.P. Cooper; Desmond Dickinson; Sidney Eaton
- Edited by: Leslie Brittain
- Production company: Stoll Pictures
- Distributed by: New Era
- Release date: 9 February 1928
- Running time: 84 minutes
- Country: United Kingdom
- Languages: Sound (Synchronized); English Intertitles

The Guns of Loos is a 1928 British sound war film directed by Sinclair Hill and starring Henry Victor, Madeleine Carroll, and Bobby Howes. The film was given a limited release as a silent film before being converted into a sound film late in 1928. While the sound version of the film has no audible dialog, it was released with a synchronized musical score with sound effects using both the sound-on-disc and sound-on-film process. Like the majority of films from the early sound era, this film was made available in a silent version for theatres that had not yet converted to sound.

== Plot ==
A blind veteran of the First World War returns home to run his family's industrial empire.

== Cast ==
- Henry Victor as John Grimlaw
- Madeleine Carroll as Diana Cheswick
- Bobby Howes as Danny
- Hermione Baddeley as Mavis
- Donald Macardle as Clive
- Adeline Hayden Coffin as Lady Cheswick
- Jeanne le Vaye as Arlette
- Philip Hewland as Stevens
- Frank Goldsmith as Colonel Jameson
- Tom Coventry as Tubby
- William Freshman as Officer
- Wally Patch as Sergeant
- Daniel Laidlaw VC as himself

== Music ==
The film featured a theme song entitled “If You’d but Say You Care” which was composed by Arthur Crocker and Harry Major.

== Production background ==
Carroll was selected for the role from 150 applicants to play her role. It was her first film role and helped launch her career.

Daniel Laidlaw, an army piper who won the Victoria Cross while rallying his company at the 1915 Battle of Loos, plays himself.

== Score ==
In 2011, sheet music for Richard Howgill's score, meant to be performed live for the silent version of the film, was rediscovered in Birmingham Central Library.
