= Rex McDougall =

English actor (1878–1933)

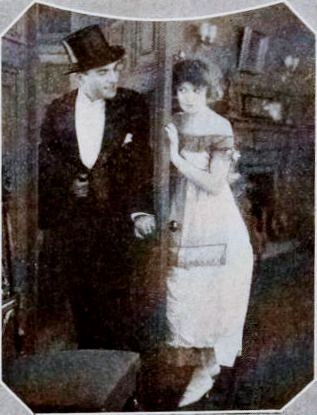
Rex McDougall and Ann Murdock in Please Help Emily (1917)

Rex McDougall (13 December 1878 – 30 August 1933) was an English stage and film actor. He was born as Reginald McDougall in Kensington, London, England, UK and died at age 54 in Marylebone, London, England, UK.

== Selected filmography ==
- Please Help Emily (1917)
- A Daughter of the Old South (1918)
- The Beloved Blackmailer (1918)
- My Wife (1918)
- Le Secret du Lone Star (1920)
- The Bargain (1921)
- The Knight Errant (1922)
- The Hound of the Baskervilles (1921)
- A Gipsy Cavalier (1922)
