= Afterwards (1928 film) =

1928 British silent film by Lawson Butt

- Directed by: Lawson Butt
- Written by: R. Byron Webber
- Starring: Marjorie Hume; Julie Suedo; Joseph R. Tozer; Cecil Barry
- Production company: Bushey Studios
- Distributed by: Associated Producers & Distributors
- Release date: November 1928
- Running time: 6,500 feet
- Country: United Kingdom
- Languages: Silent; English intertitles

Afterwards is a 1928 British silent drama film directed by Lawson Butt and starring Marjorie Hume, Julie Suedo and Joseph R. Tozer. It was made at Bushey Studios, and based on a novel by Kathlyn Rhodes.

== Cast ==
- Marjorie Hume – Mrs Carstairs
- Julie Suedo – Tocati
- Joseph R. Tozer – Doctor Anstice
- Cecil Barry – Bruce Cheniston
- Dorinea Shirley – Iris Wayne
- Jean Jay – Hilda Ryder
- Pat Courtney – Cherry
- Fewlass Llewellyn – Sir Richard Wayne
- Frank Perfitt – Major Carstairs

== Bibliography ==
- Low, Rachael. History of the British Film, 1918–1929. George Allen & Unwin, 1971. ISBN 978-0-04-791021-0.
