= Please Help Emily =

1917 film by Dell Henderson

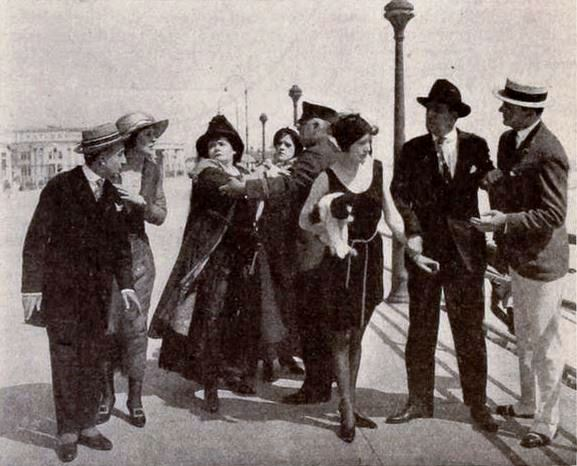
- Film still
- Directed by: Dell Henderson
- Written by: Joseph F. Poland (scenario)
- Based on: Please Help Emily by H. H. Harwood
- Produced by: Empire All Star Corp. (Charles Frohman)
- Starring: Ann Murdock
- Cinematography: William Crolly
- Production company: Empire All Star Corp.
- Distributed by: Mutual Film
- Release date: November 19, 1917
- Running time: 5 reels
- Country: United States
- Language: Silent (English intertitles)

Please Help Emily is 1917 American silent comedy-drama film starring Ann Murdock and directed by Dell Henderson. It is based on the 1916 Broadway play Please Help Emily that starred Ann Murdock. Charles Frohman's company, of whom Murdock was employed on the stage, produced the film and released it through Mutual Film. It is now a lost film.

== Plot ==
As described in a film magazine, Professor Delmar (Hubert Druce) is sent to China to study child-life and decides to leave his daughter Emily (Murdock), who is always getting into trouble, with his good friends the Lethbridges. One night Emily runs away from a musicale and attends a cabaret. Not knowing how to explain matters and feeling sure that Trotters (McDougall), a friend, can help her out, she goes to his apartment. Waiting for him to return from the club, she takes a nap. Mrs. Lethbridge (Veness), not wishing her husband to know of Emily's escapade, tells him that Emily is staying with her aunt, who has the mumps. Trotter is told of the story and, wishing to make it good, plans to take Emily to her aunt's house. They stop at a hotel for lunch. Emily has her dog hidden and tells Trotter that it is lost and that she will not leave the hotel until it is found. Julia (Carlyle), the fiancée of Trotter, decides to visit the sick aunt. She is accompanied by Herbert Threadgold (Gottschalk) a nervous little body who is in love with Emily. Their automobile breaks down and they are forced to stay at the same hotel that Emily and Trotter are staying. Aunt Geraldine follows and they are all arrested for kidnapping Emily, but through the efforts of Lethbridge (Brown) they are all released. Julia marries Threadgold and, to avoid a scandal, Emily marries Trotter, not that either objects.

== Cast ==
- Ann Murdock as Emily Delmar
- Hubert Druce as Professor Delmar
- Amy Veness as Mrs. Lethbridge
- Grace Carlyle as Julia Marchmont
- Katherine Stewart as Mrs. Moxon
- Rex McDougall as Richard Trotter
- Ferdinand Gottschalk as Herbert Threadgold
- John Harwood as Francis
- Jules Raucort as Rene Dufour
- Halbert Brown as Honorable Samuel Lethbridge
