= William Stack =

American actor (1882-1949)

- Born: March 5, 1882; Baker, Oregon, U.S.
- Died: January 15, 1949 (aged 66); Pasadena, California, U.S.
- Occupation: Actor
- Years active: 1918–1945

William Stack (March 5, 1882 – January 15, 1949) was an American actor who began his acting career in Great Britain. Over the course of his career he appeared in over 50 films in the United States and United Kingdom, including such notable films as Mary of Scotland, Captains Courageous, and Gone with the Wind.

== Life and career ==
Stack was born on March 5, 1882, in Baker, Oregon. He began his acting career on the stage in England, before entering the film industry with a starring role in the 1918 British silent film, The Girl from Downing Street. He also starred in the 1922 British film, The Scourge, which also stars Madge Stuart and J.R. Tozer.

In 1930, Stack returned to the U.S., making his American film debut with a featured role in the melodrama, Sarah and Son, starring Ruth Chatterton and Fredric March. He followed this with an appearance as Travis in Derelict, directed by Rowland V. Lee, and starring George Bancroft, Jessie Royce Landis, and William "Stage" Boyd. He finished the year in the small role of Dr. Fowler in The Right to Love, starring Ruth Chatterton and Paul Lukas. In 1931 he only appeared in a single film, the legal drama A Free Soul, in a small role. The film stars Norma Shearer, Leslie Howard, Lionel Barrymore, and Clark Gable. 1932 would see him in another small role, that of a doctor in Payment Deferred, starring Charles Laughton and Maureen O'Sullivan. In Charlie Chan's Greatest Case (1933), starring Warner Oland in the title role, Stack had the minor part of Jack Eagan. Small roles followed in the 1934 films The Fountain, starring Ann Harding, Manhattan Melodrama, starring Clark Gable, William Powell, and Myrna Loy, Wonder Bar, starring Al Jolson, and Chained, starring Gable and Joan Crawford. Before he appeared in the substantial role as Warner Baxter's captain in the war drama, Hell in the Heavens. In 1935 he again had several small roles in such films as Rendezvous, where he played a waiter, as a director in The Man Who Broke the Bank at Monte Carlo, and as Sir Phillip in The Perfect Gentleman. Stack also played the Judge Advocate, another small role, in the classic 1935 version of Mutiny on the Bounty, starring Charles Laughton and Clark Gable. That year he also had prominent roles in several films. He played a mysterious professor, Henri Fresnel, the father of Wendy Barrie, in the murder mystery, College Scandal. Stack also had a leading role in the historical drama, Becky Sharp, which was notable because it was the first film shot entirely in the new three-strip Technicolor process.

Stack's final screen performance was as the Butler in the 1945 spy film, Confidential Agent, starring Charles Boyer and Lauren Bacall.

Stack died on January 15, 1949, at the age of 66, in Pasadena, California.

== Filmography ==
(Per AFI database)

- Derelict (1930) as Party Guest Gossiper (uncredited)
- The Right to Love (1930) as Dr. Fowler
- Sarah and Son (1930) as Cyril Belloc
- A Free Soul (1931) as Dick Roland (uncredited)
- Payment Deferred (1932) as A Doctor
- Charlie Chan's Greatest Case (1933) as James Eagan
- The Fountain (1934) as Commandant
- Manhattan Melodrama (1934) as Judge (uncredited)
- Hell in the Heavens (1934) as Capt. Andre De Laage
- Wonder Bar (1934) as Businessman (uncredited)
- Tarzan and His Mate (1934) as Tom Pierce (uncredited)
- Chained (1934) as James, Richard's Butler (uncredited)
- The Mystery of Mr. X (1934) as Travers Gordon (uncredited)
- What Every Woman Knows (1934) as Tenterden - Sybil's Brother (uncredited)
- I've Been Around (1935) as Doctor
- The Winning Ticket (1935) as Jeffries (uncredited)
- Rendezvous (1935) as Headwaiter (uncredited)
- Becky Sharp (1935) as Pitt Crawley
- College Scandal (1935) as Dr. Henri Fresnel
- The Man Who Broke the Bank at Monte Carlo (1935) as Director (uncredited)
- The Perfect Gentleman (1935) as Sir Percy Phillips (uncredited)
- Mutiny on the Bounty (1935) as Judge Advocate (uncredited)
- Dressed to Thrill (1935) as Canadian Colonel (uncredited)
- Magnificent Obsession (1935) as Doctor (uncredited)
- The Last of the Mohicans (1936) as General Montcalm
- Mary of Scotland (1936) as Ruthven
- Stowaway (1936) as Alfred Kruikshank
- Pennies From Heaven (1936) as Clarence B. Carmichael
- Rose-Marie (1936) as Gordon (uncredited)
- The Gorgeous Hussy (1936)
- His Brother's Wife (1936) as Winters
- Souls at Sea (1937) as Judge (uncredited)
- Captains Courageous (1937) as Elliott (uncredited)
- Criminal Lawyer (1937) as District Attorney Hopkins
- Parnell (1937) as Conservative Member (uncredited)
- The Soldier and the Lady (1937) as Grand Duke
- The Emperor's Candlesticks (1937) as Czar (voice, uncredited)
- Personal Property (1937) as Bobby at Crystal's House (uncredited)
- A Christmas Carol (1938) as Man Discussing Scrooge's Funeral (uncredited)
- Four Men and a Prayer (1938) as Prosecuting Pttorney
- Man-Proof (1938) as Minister
- Booloo (1938) as Col. Stanley Jaye
- Of Human Hearts (1938) as Uniform Salesman (uncredited)
- The Shopworn Angel (1938) as Minister (uncredited)
- The Lady in Question (1940) as Mr. Marinier (uncredited)
- The Earl of Chicago (1940) as Coroner (uncredited)
- Victory (1940)
- Among the Living (1941) as Minister
- So Ends Our Night (1941) as Professor Meyer
- Confidential Agent (1945) as The Butler (uncredited)
- The Picture of Dorian Gray (1945) as Mr. Erskine (uncredited)
