= The Conspirators (1924 film) =

1924 British film by Sinclair Hill

- Directed by: Sinclair Hill
- Written by: Sinclair Hill
- Based on: The Avenger; 1907 novel by E. Phillips Oppenheim
- Starring: Betty Faire; David Hawthorne; Moore Marriott
- Cinematography: Horace Wheddon
- Edited by: Challis Sanderson
- Production company: Stoll Pictures
- Distributed by: Stoll Pictures
- Release date: May 1924
- Country: United Kingdom
- Languages: Silent; English intertitles

The Conspirators is a 1924 British silent crime film directed by Sinclair Hill and starring Betty Faire, David Hawthorne and Moore Marriott.

== Cast ==
- Betty Faire as Louise Fitzmaurice
- David Hawthorne as Herbert Wrayson
- Moore Marriott as Morris / Sydney Barnes
- Edward O'Neill as Colonel Fitzmaurice
- Margaret Hope as Mrs. Barnes
- Winifred Izard as Queen of Rexonia
- Fred Rains as Benham

== Production ==
The film was made by Britain's leading film company of the era Stoll Pictures at their Cricklewood Studios in London. It was based on the 1907 novel The Avenger by E. Phillips Oppenheim. The film's sets were designed by art director Walter Murton.

== Bibliography ==
- Low, Rachael. History of the British Film, 1918-1929. George Allen & Unwin, 1971.
