= A Romance of Mayfair =

1925 film directed by Thomas Bentley

- Directed by: Thomas Bentley
- Written by: J.C. Snaith (novel)
- Starring: Betty Faire; Henry Victor; Molly Johnson; Fred Raynham
- Production company: Stoll Pictures
- Distributed by: Stoll Pictures
- Release date: 1925
- Country: United Kingdom

A Romance of Mayfair is a 1925 British romance film directed by Thomas Bentley and starring Betty Faire, Henry Victor and Molly Johnson. It was based on the novel The Crime of Constable Kelly by J.C. Snaith and made by Stoll Pictures at their Cricklewood Studios. The screenplay concerns the love affair between the heir to a Duke and a young actress.

== Premise ==
The love affair between the heir to a Duke and a young actress is almost ruined because of the gulf in class between them.

== Cast ==
- Betty Faire – Mary Lawrence
- Henry Victor – Jack Dinneford
- Molly Johnson – Lady Blanche
- Fred Raynham – Sir Dugald MacLean
- Edward O'Neill – Duke of Bridport
- George Foley – Sergeant Kelly
- Temple Bell – Millie Wren
- Reginald Bach – Lord Wrexham
- Gertrude Sterroll – Lady Wargrave
- Eva Westlake – Mrs. Wren
