= Eille Norwood =

English actor, director, playwright (1861–1948)

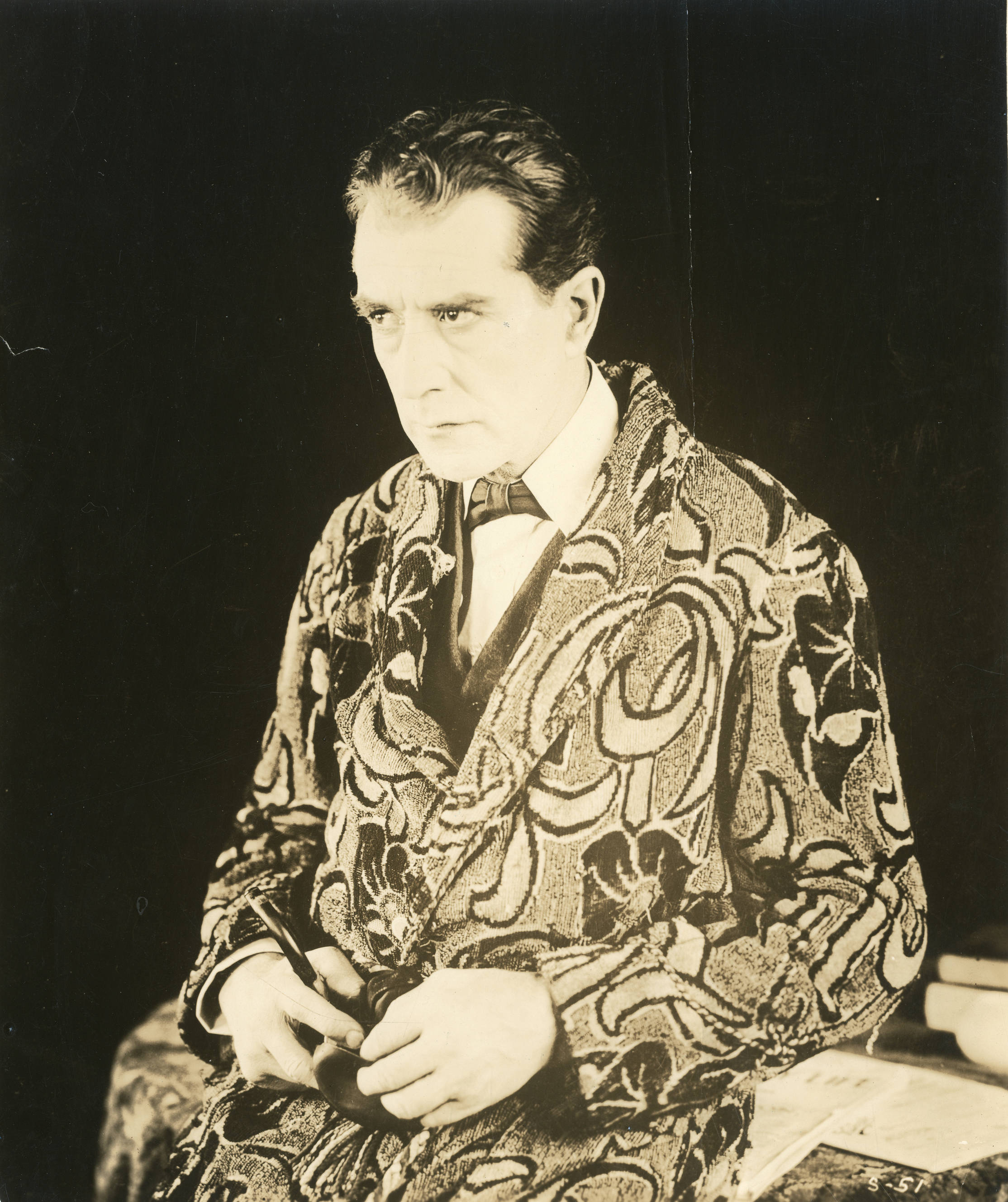
- Norwood as Sherlock Holmes in 1923
- Born: Anthony Edward Brett; 11 October 1861; York, England
- Died: 24 December 1948 (aged 87); London, England
- Resting place: Green Lane Cemetery, Farnham, Surrey
- Occupations: Actor; Director; Playwright
- Years active: 1884–1934
- Spouse: Ruth Mackay (m. 1905)

Eille Norwood (born Anthony Edward Brett; 11 October 1861 – 24 December 1948) was an English stage actor, director, and playwright best known today for playing Sherlock Holmes in a series of silent films.

== Early life ==
He was born 11 October 1861 in York as Anthony Edward Brett and educated at Pocklington School followed by St John's College, Cambridge (B.A. 1883). Norwood took his stage name from a woman he once loved named Eileen and Norwood in southeast London, where he lived.

== Career ==
His first professional stage appearance was in 1884 with F. R. Benson's Shakespearean company. In 1886-7 he worked for Edward Compton's company. He was active on the stage until 1892, when he became ill and did not recover until about 1899. After acting in a revival of his play The Noble Art, retitled The Talk of the Town, in 1901, he resumed regular stage work. For some years he was employed by Charles Wyndham, appearing for him in My Lady of Rosedale (1904), Captain Drew on Leave (1906), and The Liars (1907). Among many other roles, he toured in 1909 as Raffles in a stage version of the amateur detective. He made his film debut in 1911. He directed the successful production of The Man Who Stayed at Home, which ran in London from December 1914 to July 1916.

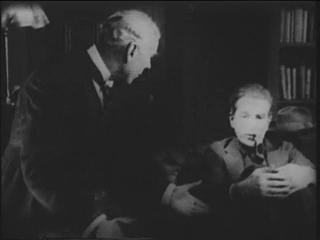
Eille Norwood as Sherlock Holmes pictured with Hubert Willis as Dr. Watson

From 1921 to 1923 Norwood played Holmes in 45 two-reel short films in three series: The Adventures of Sherlock Holmes (1921), The Further Adventures of Sherlock Holmes (1922) and The Last Adventures of Sherlock Holmes (1923), and in two feature films, The Hound of the Baskervilles and The Sign of Four directed by Maurice Elvey and George Ridgwell. The Golden Pince-Nez was restored by the BFI National Archive in 2024 and screened for the first time since 1922. Hubert Willis played Watson in nearly all these films. For the final Holmes film, however, Hubert Willis was replaced by Arthur Cullin. Until Jonny Lee Miller's run in the tv series Elementary (2012 - 2019), Norwood had played Holmes more times than any other actor in film or TV.

Norwood was earlier a stage actor associated with the Brough-Boucicault company, and he wrote several plays which were produced commercially:

- Chalk and Cheese (one act)
- Hook and Eye
- The Talk of the Town (previous title The Noble Art), about a fusty old solicitor who is hypnotised into competing in a boxing tournament. The play was first performed at the Theatre Royal in York in 1892, and then in 1893 at Terry's in London with Arthur Williams as Andrew Fullalove, and fifteen years later in Australia, with Hugh J. Ward in the lead part.
- The Grey Room (with Max Pemberton) - produced in York in 1911

Following his appearance in the films, Norwood appeared on the London stage as Sherlock Holmes in The Return of Sherlock Holmes in October 1923. The play was successful enough that it was toured in Europe without Norwood after its London run. Norwood continued to appear on the London stage until at least 1934.

== Personal life ==
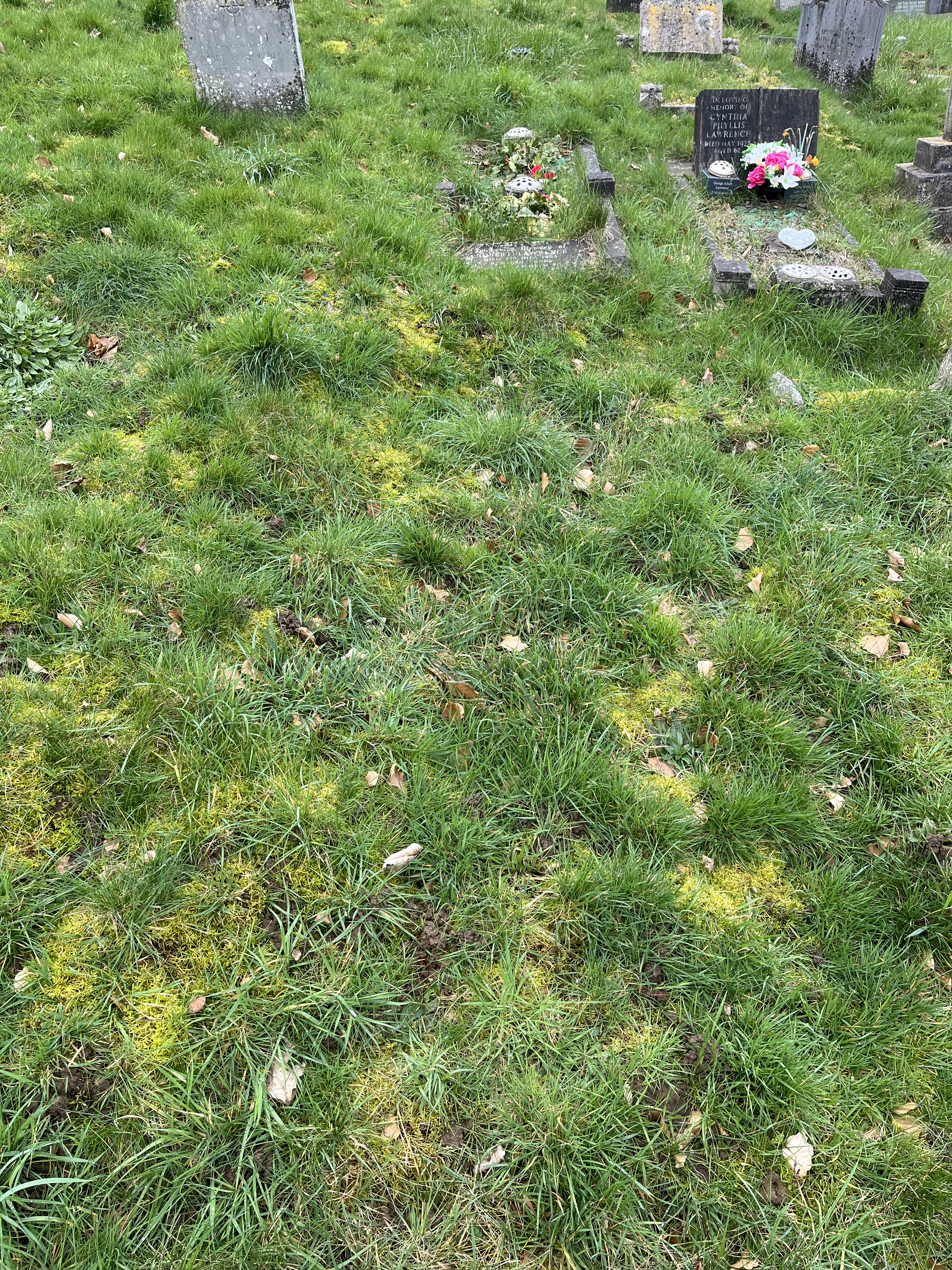
The unmarked grave of Eille Norwood in Green Lane Cemetery in Farnham, Surrey in 2026

In 1905 Norwood married fellow English stage and silent film actress Ruth Mackay (1878-1949). His step-daughter actress Jane Grahame (1899-1981) married actor/writer Ernest Dudley, creator of another well-known English detective character, Doctor Morelle. In his later years he lived at Corner Cottage, Waverley Lane in Farnham in Surrey.

Norwood died in London on Christmas Eve 1948 at age 87. He is buried in an unmarked grave in Green Lane Cemetery in Farnham in Surrey.

== Quote ==
- Sir Arthur Conan Doyle himself admired Norwood's portrayal, saying: "His wonderful impersonation of Holmes has amazed me."
- The BFI's Executive Director of Knowledge, Learning and Collections, Arike Oke, said: “Eille Norwood embodies the original tales’ Victorian sleuth, encountering Britain’s Empire at its globe-trotting height while exploring 1920s London: that fertile ground of mystery and duplicity."

== Filmography ==
Year	Title	Role	Notes
1911	Princess Clementina	James Stuart	Short
1916	The Charlatan	Dr. O'Kama	
1916	Temptation's Hour		
1920	The Hundredth Chance	Dr. Jonathon Capper	
1920	The Tavern Knight	The Tavern Knight	
1921	A Scandal in Bohemia	Sherlock Holmes	
1921	A Gentleman of France	Gaston de Marsac	
1921	The Hound of the Baskervilles	Sherlock Holmes	
1921	Gwyneth of the Welsh Hills	Lord Pryse	
1922	The Recoil	Francis	
1922	Charles Augustus Milverton	Sherlock Holmes	
1922	The Crimson Circle		
1923	The Sign of Four	Sherlock Holmes	(final film role)

== See also ==
- Sherlock Holmes (Stoll film series)
- List of people who have played Sherlock Holmes
