= Dennis Eadie =

British stage actor (1875–1928)

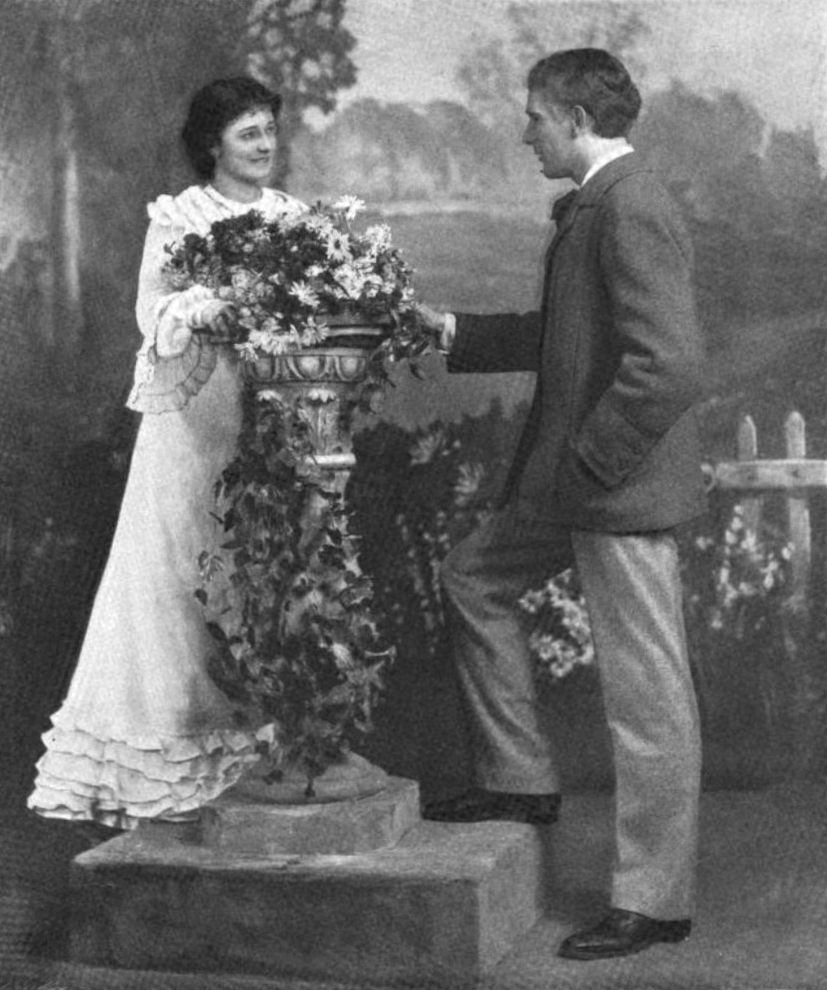
- Born: 14 January 1875; Glasgow, Scotland; United Kingdom
- Died: 10 June 1928 (aged 53); England; United Kingdom
- Occupation(s): Film actor Stage actor

Dennis Eadie (14 January 1875 – 10 June 1928) was a British stage actor who also appeared in three films during the silent era. Eadie was a leading actor of the British theatre, appearing in plays by Edward Knoblauch, Harley Granville-Barker and Louis N. Parker.

In 1902 he appeared as Gilbert Etheridge in Memory's Garden, by Albert Chevalier, at the Comedy Theatre, London. In 1916 he became the first man to play the British prime minister Benjamin Disraeli in a feature film. In 1918 he starred in the hit West End comedy The Freedom of the Seas by Walter Hackett.

In 1928 Eadie played Hanaud in a London revival of the popular play At the Villa Rose.

== Selected filmography ==
- The Man Who Stayed at Home (1915)
- Disraeli (1916)

== Bibliography ==
- Davis, Tracy C. The Economics of the British Stage 1800-1914. Cambridge University Press, 2007.
