= The Knight Errant (film) =

1922 film

- Directed by: George Ridgwell
- Written by: Leslie Howard Gordon; Mrs. Sydney Groome
- Starring: Madge Stuart; Rex McDougall; Olaf Hytten
- Production company: Stoll Pictures
- Distributed by: Stoll Pictures
- Release date: February 1922
- Country: United Kingdom
- Languages: Silent; English intertitles

The Knight Errant is a 1922 British silent romance film directed by George Ridgwell and starring Madge Stuart, Rex McDougall and Olaf Hytten.

== Cast ==
- Madge Stuart as Ernestine
- Rex McDougall as Cecil Mordaunt Livingston
- Olaf Hytten as Hernando Perez
- Norma Whalley as Lady Cardwell
- Judd Green as Mr. Perkiss
- Eva Westlake as Mrs. Perkiss

== Bibliography ==
- Goble, Alan. The Complete Index to Literary Sources in Film. Walter de Gruyter, 1999.
