= J. Fisher White =

British stage and film actor (1865–1945)

- Born: 1 May 1865; Bristol; United Kingdom
- Died: 14 January 1945 (age 79); London; United Kingdom
- Occupations: Film actor Stage actor
- Years active: 1905–1940 (film)

Joseph John Fisher White (1 May 1865 – 14 January 1945) was a British stage and film actor. The eldest of four sons of Rev. John White, of Ampfield, of that family formerly of Hursley, by his wife Martha, daughter of Rev. John Fisher, he was educated at Monkton Combe School and Oriel College, Oxford, graduating BA in 1887. He became a solicitor's clerk (1891 census).

White developed a reputation for playing character roles in the theatre and began to appear in a significant number of British films from the early 1920s onwards. He was Chairman of the Actors' Association. He was the uncle of the actor Wilfrid Hyde-White.

== Selected filmography ==
- Damaged Goods (1919)
- Diana of the Crossways (1922)
- A Tale of Two Cities (1922)
- Owd Bob (1924)
- One Colombo Night (1926)
- The Island of Despair (1926)
- The Only Way (1927)
- Balaclava (1928)
- The City of Youth (1928)
- The Last Post (1929)
- Lily of Killarney (1929)
- Loose Ends (1930)
- Kissing Cup's Race (1930)
- Madame Guillotine (1931)
- A Man of Mayfair (1931)
- The Good Companions (1933)
- The Great Defender (1934)
- What Happened Then? (1934)
- The Old Curiosity Shop (1934)
- Turn of the Tide (1935)
- City of Beautiful Nonsense (1935)
- Hearts of Humanity (1936)
- Little Miss Somebody (1937)
- Dreaming Lips (1937)
- The Man Who Made Diamonds (1937)
- Under the Red Robe (1937)
- Pastor Hall (1940)

== Bibliography ==
- Kruger, Loren. The National Stage: Theatre and Cultural Legitimation in England, France, and America. University of Chicago Press, 1992.
- Richards, Jeffrey (ed.). The Unknown 1930s: An Alternative History of the British Cinema, 1929-1939. I.B Tauris, 2001.
- Fox-Davies, Arthur Charles. Armorial families: a directory of gentlemen of coat armour (seventh edition), vol. 2. Hurst and Blackett, 1929
