= The Man Who Stayed at Home (1919 film) =

1919 film by Herbert Blaché

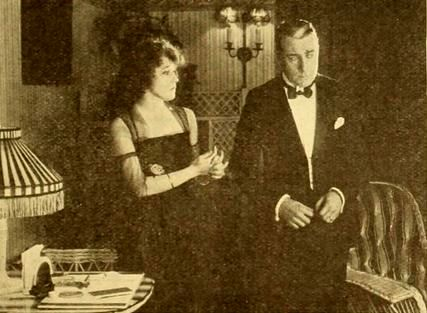
- Film still with Claire Whitney and King Baggot
- Directed by: Herbert Blache
- Based on: The Man Who Stayed at Home (play) by: Lechmere Worrall; J. E. Harold Terry
- Produced by: Herbert Blaché
- Starring: King Baggot; Claire Whitney
- Cinematography: Eugene Gaudio
- Production company: Screen Classics Inc.
- Distributed by: Metro Pictures Corporation
- Release date: July 6, 1919
- Running time: 6 reels
- Country: United States
- Languages: Silent; English intertitles

The Man Who Stayed at Home is a 1919 American silent adventure drama film directed by Herbert Blaché and starring King Baggot, Claire Whitney. It was based on the play The Man Who Stayed at Home by J. E. Harold Terry and Lechmere Worrall.

== Plot ==
Set in Virginia 1918, German spies passing information on American coastal defences are thwarted by Christopher Brent (Baggot) who is working for the secret service.

== Cast ==
- King Baggot as Christopher Brent
- Claire Whitney as Molly Preston
- Robert Whittier as Fritz
- A.J. Herbert as Norman Preston
- Lila Leslie as Miriam Lee
- Frank Bennett as Carl Sanderson
- Ricca Allen as Miss Myrtle
- Robert Paton Gibbs as Judge Preston
- Julia Calhoun as Fraulein Schroder
- Ida Darling as Mrs Sanderson
- A. Lloyd Pack as Gaston Letour
