= Gwyneth of the Welsh Hills =

1921 film

- Directed by: Floyd Martin Thornton
- Written by: Edith Nepean (novel); Leslie Howard Gordon
- Starring: Madge Stuart; Eille Norwood; Lewis Gilbert; Harvey Braban
- Cinematography: Percy Strong
- Production company: Stoll Pictures
- Distributed by: Stoll Pictures
- Release date: November 1921
- Running time: 6,000 feet
- Country: United Kingdom
- Languages: Silent; English intertitles

Gwyneth of the Welsh Hills is a 1921 British silent romance film directed by Floyd Martin Thornton and starring Madge Stuart, Eille Norwood and Lewis Gilbert. It was based on a novel by Edith Nepean.

== Cast ==
- Madge Stuart as Gwyneth
- Eille Norwood as Lord Pryse
- Lewis Gilbert as Davydd Owen
- Harvey Braban as Gwylim Rhys
- R. Henderson Bland as Shadrack Morgan
- Elizabeth Herbert as Megan Powers
- Gladys Jennings as Blodwen
- Dalton Somers as Denis
- Joseph R. Tozer as Evan Pryse
- Robert Vallis as But Lloyd
- Sam Wilkinson as Shores
- Mrs. Hubert Willis as Jan Rhys

== Bibliography ==
- Low, Rachael; Manvell, Roger (1971). The History of the British Film: 1918-1929. George Allen & Unwin. ISBN 978-0-04-791021-0.
