= The Man Who Stayed at Home (1915 film) =

- Directed by: Cecil M. Hepworth
- Based on: The Man Who Stayed at Home (play) by: Lechmere Worrall; J. E. Harold Terry
- Starring: Dennis Eadie; Violet Hopson; Alma Taylor
- Production company: Hepworth Picture Plays
- Distributed by: Central Films
- Release date: July 1915
- Running time: 3,000 feet
- Country: United Kingdom
- Languages: Silent; English intertitles

The Man Who Stayed at Home is a 1915 British silent thriller film directed by Cecil M. Hepworth and starring Dennis Eadie, Violet Hopson and Alma Taylor. It is based on the play by Lechmere Worrall and J. E. Harold Terry.

== Plot summary ==
During the First World War a detective poses as a man who has evaded military service in order to infiltrate a gang of enemy spies operating out of a coastal boarding house.

== Cast ==
- Dennis Eadie as Christopher Brent
- Violet Hopson as Miriam Leigh
- Alma Taylor as Molly Preston
- Lionelle Howard as Carl Sanderson
- Chrissie White as Daphne Kidlington
- Henry Edwards as Fritz
- Dorothy Rowan as Mrs. Sanderson
- Jean Cadell as Miss Myrtle
- Ruby Belasco as Fraulein Schroeder

== Bibliography ==
- Palmer, Scott. British Film Actors' Credits, 1895-1987. McFarland, 1988.
