= Dorothy Cumming =

American actress (1894–1983)

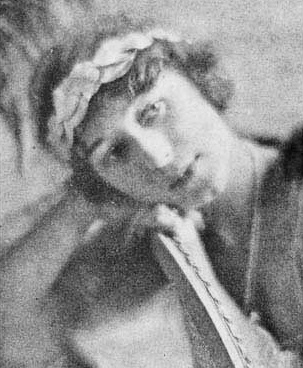
- Publicity photo of Cumming from Who's Who on the Screen (1920)
- Born: Dorothy Greville Cumming; 12 April 1894; Boorowa, New South Wales, Australia
- Died: 10 December 1983 (aged 89); New York, New York, U.S.
- Occupation: Actress
- Years active: 1915–1929
- Spouses: Frank Elliott (m. 1922; div. 1927) Allan McNab (m. 1932)
- Children: 2

Dorothy Greville Cumming (12 April 1894 – 10 December 1983) was an Australian-born actress of the silent film era. She appeared in 39 American, English, and Australian films between 1915 and 1929, notably appearing as the Virgin Mary in Cecil B. DeMille's 1927 film The King of Kings and the jealous wife in Victor Sjöström's 1928 The Wind. She also appeared in stage productions in those same countries.

== Childhood and early career ==
Dorothy Greville Cumming was born in Boorowa, New South Wales. Her father, Victor Albert Cumming, born in 1859 in Brisbane, Queensland, was an officer of the Lands Department and also owned Narrangullen sheep station, near Yass. Her mother was the former Sarah T. Fennell. Her paternal grandparents, Frederick Cumming and Agnes Jane Stuart, were born in Scotland and England, respectively while her maternal grandparents were from England.

The family moved to Sydney around 1904, settling in the Sydney suburb of Woollahra. There, while a student at Ascham School, Dorothy attended elocution and acting lessons, appearing on stage from 1907. In 1911 she appeared with Enid Bennett in J. C. Williamson's production Everywoman.

In 1915 she appeared in the 6 reel J.C. Williamson film Within our Gates, or Deeds that Won Gallipoli, a spy drama directed by English actor-director Frank Harvey. At this time Williamsons made a handful of films using their own actors, in response to the threat of increasing American imports, including Get-Rich-Quick Wallingford and Officer 666, directed by Fred Niblo. Determined to follow a career in film, Cumming departed for the US in mid 1916.

She portrayed Naomi in Basil Rathbone's Judas at the Longacre Theatre in 1929.

Cumming had three full siblings, including two sisters who also moved to the United States. Rose Cumming became a prominent American interior decorator, and Eileen Cumming an advertising executive, who married rheumatologist Russell LaFayette Cecil. Cumming also had several half-siblings from her mother's first marriage.

== Marriages ==
Cumming was married twice. Her husbands were:

- Frank Elliott Dakin (married 4 April 1922, separated 1925, divorced 9 December 1927), a stage director known professionally as Frank Elliott. They had two sons, each of whom took his mother's maiden name after their parents' divorce: Anthony "Tony" Cumming and Lt. Greville C. E. Cumming. During the divorce trial, it was revealed that Cummings, for the role of Mary in King of Kings, had in 1926 signed a contract with DeMille that regulated her personal life for seven years, which included a no divorce clause for any act or thing done, and prohibited her from doing anything which could be grounds for divorce. It did not prevent the divorce from proceeding.
- Allan McNab, married 2 August 1932. He was a British artist and designer who became the art director of Life, worked as design director for Norman Bel Geddes, and became the director of administration of the Art Institute of Chicago.

== Death ==
She died in New York City in 1983.

== Selected filmography ==
- Within Our Gates (1915)
- Snow White (1916)
- A Woman Who Understood (1920)
- The Notorious Miss Lisle (1920)
- The Woman and the Puppet (1920)
- The Notorious Mrs. Sands (1920)
- Ladies Must Live (1921)
- Don't Tell Everything (1921)
- The Man From Home (1922)
- Manslaughter (1922)
- The Cheat (1923)
- The Self-Made Wife (1923)
- Twenty-One (1923)
- Nellie, the Beautiful Cloak Model (1924)
- The Female (1924)
- The Manicure Girl (1925)
- A Kiss for Cinderella (1925)
- One Way Street (1925)
- The New Commandment (1925)
- Dancing Mothers (1926)
- For Wives Only (1926)
- Mademoiselle Modiste (1926)
- Butterflies in the Rain (1926)
- The King of Kings (1927)
- In Old Kentucky (1927)
- The Lovelorn (1927)
- Forbidden Hours (1928)
- Life's Mockery (1928)
- Our Dancing Daughters (1928)
- The Wind (1928)
- Kitty (1929)
