= Account Rendered (1932 film) =

1932 British film by Leslie Howard Gordon

- Directed by: Leslie Howard Gordon
- Written by: Michael Joseph (play); Leslie Howard Gordon
- Starring: Cecil Ramage; Reginald Bach
- Cinematography: Desmond Dickinson
- Production company: Producers Distributing Corporation
- Distributed by: Producers Distributing Corporation
- Release date: 11 July 1932
- Running time: 35 minutes
- Country: United Kingdom
- Language: English

Account Rendered is a 1932 British crime film directed by Leslie Howard Gordon and starring Cecil Ramage and Reginald Bach. It was made as a quota quickie at Cricklewood Studios.

== Cast ==
- Cecil Ramage as Barry Barriter
- Reginald Bach as Hugh Preston
- Marilyn Mawn as Barbara Wayne
- Jessie Bateman as Mrs. Wayne
- Frederick Moyes as General Firmstone

== Reception ==
Film Weekly wrote: "Even as a 'fill-up' film, Account Rendered falls into the mediocre slough of a 'stagey' production with no distinction. Cecil Ramage is the only member of the cast who shows any signs of adequacy, the development is crude, and climax tails away into nothing as if the director had lost interest in the story. ... Poor entertainment."

Kine Weekly wrote: "Direction is intelligent, and the development is always resourceful, and works up to an ingenious climax. ... Notwithstanding a tendency to over-act, the characterisations are generally capable. Cecil Ramage as Barriter, K.C., relies too much on stage technique, as does also Marilvn Mawn as Barbara. J. Hubert. Leslie as the nervous clerk is much more natural, whilst the rest of the cast play up adequately. Leslie Howard Gordon introduces his characters clearly and concisely, and makes a good impression which he sustains. The story is unfolded with satisfactory movement and without either hurry or padding, and works up to a good climax."

Picturegoer wrote: "There is a tendency to overact in parts and Cecil Ramage seems to rely a little too much on stage technique. The same thing applies to Marilyn Mawn as the girl. Characterisation is quite good however and an excellent little study comes from J. Hubert Leslie as the nervous and guilty clerk. The story is not particularly ambitious, but is competently unfolded without a lot of undue padding."
