= Madge Stuart =

British silent film actress (1895–1958)

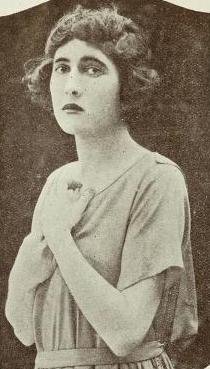
Stuart in 1922

Madge Stuart (5 August 1895, in Holmesfield, Derbyshire – 10 October 1958, in Monte Carlo, Monaco) was a British actress of the silent era. She married Dion Titheradge in 1928.

== Selected filmography ==
- Nature's Gentleman (1918)
- The Elusive Pimpernel (1919)
- The Tavern Knight (1920)
- The Amateur Gentleman (1920)
- The Iron Stair (1920)
- Gwyneth of the Welsh Hills (1921)
- Frailty (1921)
- Innocent (1921)
- General John Regan (1921)
- His Wife's Husband (1922)
- The Scourge (1922)
- Running Water (1922)
- The Knight Errant (1922)
- The Passionate Friends (1922)
- A Gamble with Hearts (1923)
- Around a Million (1924)
- The Uninvited Guest (1923)
- Women and Diamonds (1924)
- The Only Way (1927)
