= In the Wilderness =

In the Wilderness may refer to:

- In the Wilderness (Warner book), 1878 book by Charles Dudley Warner
- In the Wilderness (Undset book), 1995 book by Sigrid Undset
- In the Wilderness (1917 novel), 1917 book by Robert Hichens
- In the Wilderness (Fare book), 1913 book by John Thomas Fare
- In the Wilderness (film), 1910 short starring Margarita Fischer
- In the Wilderness: Coming of Age in Unknown Country, 1997 book by Kim Barnes
- In the Wilderness: The Doctrine of Defilement in the Book of Numbers, 2001 book by Mary Douglas
- In the Wilderness: And other poems, 1969 book by James Simmons
- In the Wilderness: Stories, 1969 book by Aron Appelfeld

== See also ==
- Bamidbar (disambiguation), Hebrew for In the Wilderness
