= Garden of Allah =

Garden of Allah may refer to:

- The Garden of Allah (novel), a 1904 novel by Robert Smythe Hichens
  - The Garden of Allah (play), a 1911 play based on the novel
  - The Garden of Allah (1916 film), based on the novel
  - The Garden of Allah (1927 film), based on the novel
  - The Garden of Allah (1936 film), based on the novel
- Garden of Allah Hotel, a residential hotel in Hollywood (1927 to 1959) popular with writers, musicians and movie stars
- Garden of Allah (cabaret), a gay cabaret in Seattle that opened in 1946
- "The Garden of Allah" (song), a 1995 song by Don Henley
- The Garden of Allah, a painting by Maxfield Parrish
- Garden of Allah Ice Plateau, a glacier and ice field connected to the Garden of Eden Ice Plateau in New Zealand's South Island
- The Garden of Allah, a guest ranch in Arizona, now the Hassayampa River Preserve
