= Call of the Blood =

(The) Call of the Blood may refer to:

- Call of the Blood (1929 film), a Czech-German silent film
- Call of the Blood (1948 film), a British-Italian drama film
- The Call of the Blood (1920 film), a French silent drama film
- The Call of the Blood (1934 film), a Mexican drama film
- The Call of the Blood (novel), a 1906 novel by Robert Hichens
