= After the Verdict =

After the Verdict may refer to:

- After the Verdict (film), a 1929 British-German drama film, based on the novel
- After the Verdict (novel), a 1924 novel by Robert Hichens
- After the Verdict (TV series), an Australian drama television series
