= The Woman with the Fan =

The Woman with the Fan may refer to:

- The Woman with the Fan (novel), a 1904 work by the British writer Robert Hichens
- The Woman with the Fan (film), a 1921 film adaptation directed by René Plaissetty
