= Beni Mora =

Suite by Holst

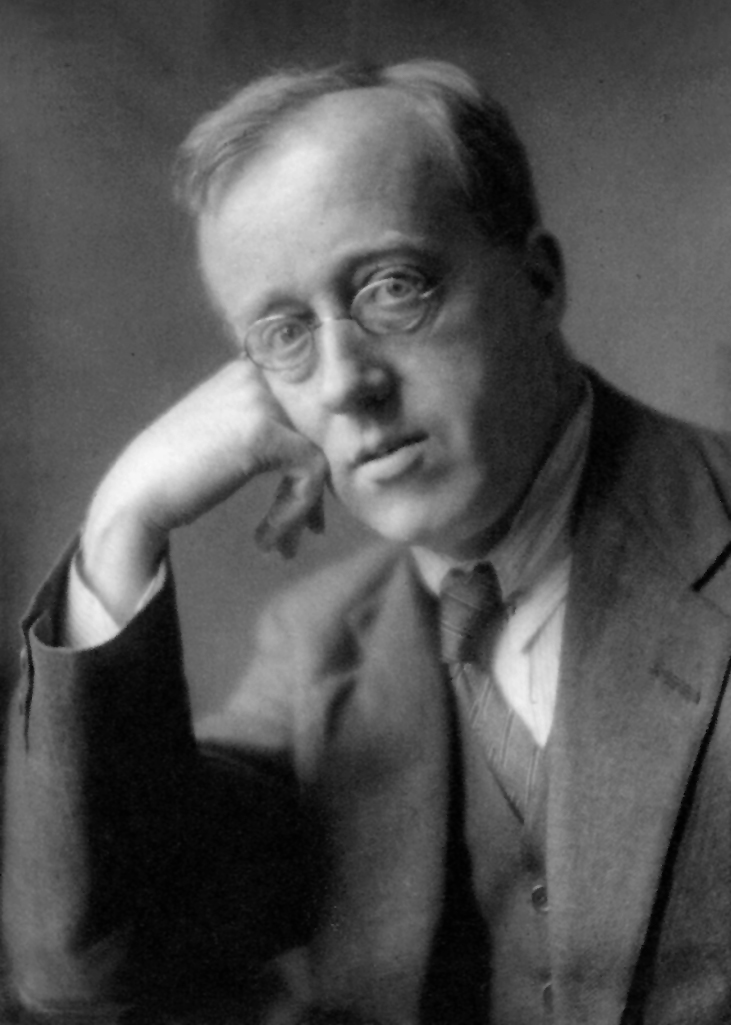
Gustav Holst ca. 1921

Beni Mora is a three-movement suite of music in E minor for large orchestra, by Gustav Holst. The first performance was at the Queen's Hall, London, on 1 May 1912, conducted by the composer. The work was inspired by music Holst heard in Algeria during a holiday in 1908. The constant repetition of one theme from Arabic folk music in the last movement has been described as a precursor of modern minimalism. The piece also includes dance rhythms and wistful, slow sections, and makes strong use of woodwinds and percussion. Beni Mora has been recorded several times by British orchestras, most recently in 2011.

== Background ==
In 1908 Holst, suffering from asthma, neuritis and depression, took a holiday in Algeria on medical advice. This trip inspired the suite Beni Mora, which incorporated music he heard in the Algerian streets. While in Algeria he listened to a local musician playing the same phrase on a bamboo flute for over two hours non-stop. He took the title from the setting of Robert Hichens's 1904 novel The Garden of Allah. The first movement was originally a stand-alone piece, Oriental Dance (1909), dedicated to the music critic Edwin Evans. In 1910 Holst added the other two movements.

== Structure ==
The work is scored, in the words of Michael Kennedy "most piquantly and colourfully". The three movements are titled, First Dance, Second Dance, and Finale: "In the Street of the Ouled Naïls."

=== First Dance ===
The dance opens with a broadly-phrased melody on the strings into which a strongly rhythmic figure interrupts, played by trumpets, trombones and tambourine. A lively dance rhythm follows, with solo parts for cor anglais, oboe and flute. The rhythm slows, and the opening string tune returns, before the full orchestra resumes the quick dance theme. The dance closes quietly. The movement typically takes between 5½ and 6½ minutes in performance, though in a 1924 recording with the London Symphony Orchestra the composer took it at a much quicker tempo, ending the movement within 4½ minutes: see table below.

=== Second Dance ===
This is the shortest of the three movements, typically taking a little under four minutes in performance. It is an allegretto with lighter scoring than the outer movements. It begins with a 5/4 rhythm for solo timpani, over which a solo bassoon enters with a quiet theme. The gentle mood is maintained by a flute solo, interrupted by the timpani. The movement, quiet almost throughout, ends pianissimo.

=== Finale: "In the Street of the Ouled Naïls" ===
The movement opens softly with phrases of indeterminate key until a solo flute enters with an eight-note theme repeated 163 times for the rest of the movement. Against the theme the full orchestra plays other dance rhythms. The volume rises to a climax and then sinks back to softness as the movement comes to an end.

== Reception ==
At the premiere the work received a mixed welcome. Some of the audience hissed and one critic wrote, "We do not ask for Biskra dancing girls in Langham Place". On the other hand, the reviewer in The Times observed, "Mr Von Holst's (Note: Holst's original surname, which he anglicised during the First World War.) suite is compiled from genuine Arab tunes treated with extraordinary skill, especially in the vivid finale, in which a number of dance tunes are combined to illustrate a night scene in Biskra."

Ralph Vaughan Williams wrote of Beni Mora, "if it had been played in Paris rather than London it would have given its composer a European reputation, and played in Italy would probably have caused a riot." More recently, the critic Andrew Clements has written of the "proto-minimalist fashion" of the repeated tune in the finale.

== Recordings ==
Conductor	Orchestra	Year	Timing 1st	Timing 2nd	Timing Finale	Ref
Gustav Holst	London Symphony Orchestra	1924	4′28″	3′06″	6′47″	
Sir Malcolm Sargent	BBC Symphony Orchestra	1958	5′24″	2′54″	5′47″	
Sir Adrian Boult	London Philharmonic Orchestra	1971	6′28″	3′55″	6′50″	
David Lloyd-Jones	Royal Scottish National Orchestra	1996	6′17″	3′58″	7′11″	
Sir Andrew Davis	BBC Philharmonic	2011	6′03″	3′49″	6′48″	

== Notes and references ==
=== Sources ===
- Holst, Imogen (1974). A Thematic Catalogue of Gustav Holst's Music. London: Faber and Faber. ISBN 0-571-10004-X.
- Mitchell, Jon C (2001). A Comprehensive Biography of Composer Gustav Holst, with Correspondence and Diary Excerpts. Lewiston, N Y: E Mellen Press. ISBN 0-7734-7522-2.
- Short, Michael (1990). Gustav Holst: The Man and his Music. Oxford: Oxford University Press. ISBN 0-19-314154-X.
