= Bracelet (disambiguation) =

A bracelet is an article worn around the wrist.

Bracelet may also refer to:

- Handcuffs, for which 'bracelets' is slang
- Bracelet (combinatorics), a cyclical sequence of symbols used in combinatorial mathematics
- World Series of Poker bracelet, an award won at the World Series of Poker
- The Bracelet (novel), a 1930 novel by Robert Hichens
- Bracelets (film), a 1931 British film
- Bracelet (horse), an Irish Thoroughbred racehorse
- The Bracelet (film), a 1918 German silent crime film
- "The Bracelet" (Curb Your Enthusiasm), a 2000 television episode
