= A Spirit in Prison =

1908 novel

- Author: Robert Hichens
- Language: English
- Genre: Drama
- Publisher: Hutchinson (Britain); Harper (US)
- Publication date: 1908
- Publication place: United Kingdom
- Media type: Print

A Spirit in Prison is a 1908 dramatic romance novel by the British writer Robert Hichens. It was inspired by time Hichens had spent in Sicily while writing his bestseller The Garden of Allah.

== Bibliography ==
- Vinson, James. Twentieth-Century Romance and Gothic Writers. Macmillan, 1982.
