= The Green Carnation =

1894 novel by Robert Hichens

- Author: Robert Hichens
- Language: English
- Genre: Satirical roman à clef
- Publisher: Heinemann (UK); D. Appleton & Company (US)
- Published: 1894
- Preceded by: The Coast Guard's Secret (1886)
- Followed by: An Imaginative Man (1895)

The Green Carnation is a novel by Robert Hichens that was first published anonymously in 1894. A satire on contemporary champions of the Aesthetic Movement, it was withdrawn briefly after the scandal of the Oscar Wilde trial in the following year. Later printings followed and it has remained popular for its depiction of the witty personalities of the time.

== Background ==
Robert Hichens, a writer on the fringes of the circle about Oscar Wilde, published The Green Carnation with Heinemann in 1894 in the UK and with D. Appleton & Company in the US. First editions were published anonymously on the advice of the English publisher in order to arouse greater interest, although his authorship was acknowledged later. According to the introduction that Hichens wrote for the Unicorn Press reprint in 1949, the book had been withdrawn from publication following the scandal of the Oscar Wilde trial in 1895. However, a Heinemann edition of 1901 lists an 1896 reissue following the first four editions of 1894-5 and claims 12,000 copies as having been printed in all.

The novel is a roman à clef and a gentle parody of aestheticism whose main characters, Esmé Amarinth and Lord Reginald Hastings, are based upon Oscar Wilde and his disciple, Lord Alfred Douglas. It has also been suggested that their hostess, Mrs Windsor, portrays Wilde's faithful friend, Ada Leverson. For most of the time they converse "brilliantly" in the Wildean manner, championing artifice over Nature and defying middle-class orthodoxy in the name of artistic individuality.

Wilde had at first been amused by The Green Carnation and had written to Ada Leverson that "I did not think [Hichens] capable of anything so clever". But when the review of the book in the Pall Mall Gazette suggested that Wilde himself could be the author, on the grounds that "A man may certainly burlesque himself if he like; in fact, it would be a clever thing to do", he immediately denied the fact: "I invented that magnificent flower. But with the middle-class and mediocre book that usurps its strangely beautiful name I have, I need hardly say, nothing whatsoever to do. The flower is a work of art. The book is not."

There are conflicting accounts of how the flower came to be associated with Wilde. Dyed flowers had already been in existence in England for a decade before he adopted it, and green carnations went on to be worn in the US by the Irish to celebrate St Patrick's Day. It is believed that Wilde and some of his supporters wore the flower to the first night of his play Lady Windermere's Fan in 1892, most probably to gain attention – a gesture similar to the decision to omit the author's name from Hichens's subsequent novel. The story that it was to identify wearers as homosexual is an unsubstantiated later invention.

== Plot ==
In the opening scene, Lord Reggie Hastings slips a green carnation into his evening coat before attending a dinner party at Mrs Windsor's house in Belgrave Square. He converses there with Esmé Amarinth, a married playwright; and Lady Locke (cousin to Mrs Windsor), a young widow who has only recently returned to England after a ten-year absence.

Some days later, Lord Reggie, Mr Amarinth and Lady Locke (together with her nine-year-old son Tommy) are guests at Mrs. Windsor's countryside cottage near Dorking. An additional guest is the mysterious Madame Valtesi whose one good action, she claims, was to marry the only man not in love with her when young. Lady Locke is initially attracted by Lord Reggie, but becomes increasingly disturbed by his wearing of the green carnation and what it symbolises about his flippant attitude to life. Lord Reggie tells her that Esmé invented the flower, and that it is only worn by a few people who are followers of "the higher philosophy".

During their stay in the village of Chenecote, Lord Reggie composes an anthem on a passage from the Song of Songs. Together with Mr Amarinth, he flatters the high church curate Mr Smith into allowing him to coach the village choir in singing it at Sunday service and directing them from the church's organ. At the village fete on Monday, held in Mrs Windsor's garden, Mr Amarinth assembles the local schoolchildren and addresses them incomprehensibly in a lecture on "The art of folly", to the outrage of their National school teachers.

Though Lord Reggie has no inclination to marry, he has been advised by Mr Amarinth that the good-natured and wealthy Lady Locke would make him a useful wife. She is fond of him, yet has realised by now how under the influence of Mr Amarinth Lord Reggie remains, as well as the incompatibility between him and herself and the destabilising influence Reggie is on the hero-worshipping Tommy. At the end of the novel, therefore, she firmly rejects his proposal, telling Lord Reggie that, as well as knowing it would only be a marriage of convenience to him, she could never accept a man whose whole behaviour and conversation is only an imitative pose.

Lady Locke then decides to take Tommy to the seaside, while Mr Amarinth and the disgruntled Lord Reggie cut short their week in the country and return together by train to London.

== Reception ==
Reviews of the novel were generally appreciative of its style but had mixed feelings about its effect. For The Observer, "The book is a classic of its kind", and in the opinion of The World, it is "brimful of good things, and exceedingly clever". The Literary World's reviewer thought that "A more telling satire on 'modernity' and the decadent could not easily be written", but in the eyes of the Glasgow Herald that might be a disadvantage: "This book is so terribly actual and up to date that in six months it will be old-fashioned."

Others take exception to the general tone of the discourse. It is, according to The Academy, "an affectation of life and literature, of an abnormality, a worship of abstract and 'scarlet sin'", while The Saturday Review is humorously dismissive: "It was, no doubt, necessary to the author to have a stone wall (represented by Lady Locke) from which the football of his epigrams would rebound with renewed agility; otherwise Lady Locke would have left the gathering of wits by the next train."

== Allusions and adaptations ==
A poem titled "Morbidezza" in the October 1894 number of Punch saw in the novel's device more artificiality than perversion:

Caught in Sham's sepulchral mesh
Art now raves of Green carnations.

A year later, Marc-André Raffalovich, a sympathetic friend of homosexuals though not of Wilde, followed with his sonnet "The Green Carnation", finding in the novel a vulgarisation of homoerotic aestheticism:

Never in his chaste or poisonous posies
Can love allow this milliner’s creation,
This shilling shocker, once a white carnation.

In the new century, Noël Coward wrote his operetta Bitter Sweet (1929) as a parody of the dandy's life style and drives the 1890s allusion home with the song "We all wear a green carnation", performed by a quartet of artistic types. It was not until 2013, however, that Frank J. Morlock based a play on Hichens's novel.
