= The Man with the Twisted Lip (film) =

1921 short silent film by Maurice Elvey

- Holmes (right) and Watson
- Directed by: Maurice Elvey
- Written by: William J. Elliott
- Based on: "The Man with the Twisted Lip" by Arthur Conan Doyle
- Produced by: Jeffrey Bernerd
- Starring: See below
- Cinematography: Germain Burger
- Production company: Stoll Picture Productions
- Distributed by: Stoll Picture Productions (UK)
- Release date: 1921
- Running time: 2 reels; 2411 feet
- Country: United Kingdom
- Language: Silent with English titles

The Man with the Twisted Lip is a 1921 British short silent film directed by Maurice Elvey. It is the eighth film in Stoll's Adventures of Sherlock Holmes series starring Eille Norwood as the detective.

== Plot summary ==
Sherlock Holmes discovers that the case of the Mrs. Neville St. Clair's missing husband may be connected to a disfigured beggar from Piccadilly Circus, known as "the man with the twisted lip".

== Cast ==
- Eille Norwood as Sherlock Holmes
- Hubert Willis as Dr. John Watson
- Robert Vallis as Neville St. Clair
- Paulette del Baye as Mrs. Nellie St. Clair
- Madame d'Esterre as Mrs. Hudson

== See also ==
- Sherlock Holmes (Stoll film series)
