= Paul Boyer (photographer) =

French photographer

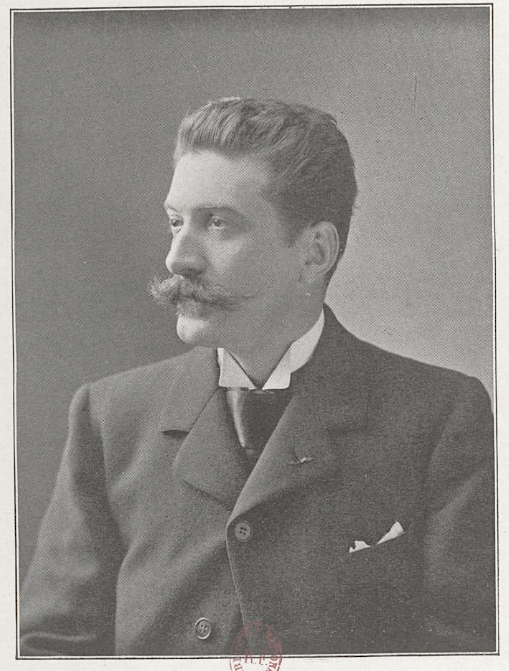
Paul Boyer by Braun Clément & Cie

Paul Boyer (September 28, 1861–1952) was a French photographer born in Toulon (Var). He was the son of Charles Boyer, architect, and of Séraphine Grec.

A student from École des Beaux-Arts (Paris), he invented the use of magnesium for the flash-lamp in photography, and got the gold medal at the Exposition Universelle of 1889. He also participated at the Moscow exhibition. He was nominated Knight of the Legion of Honor on December 30, 1891. At the Exposition Universelle of 1900, he was a member of the awarding jury. He was also decorated of officer des Palmes Académiques, officer of Nichan Iftikhar, officer of Lion and Sun. He had a studio at 35 boulevard des Capucines in Paris. He made numerous portraits of actors, actresses, and other personalities of his time, often published on postcards.

He died in 1952.

== Gallery ==
Pictures by Paul Boyer:

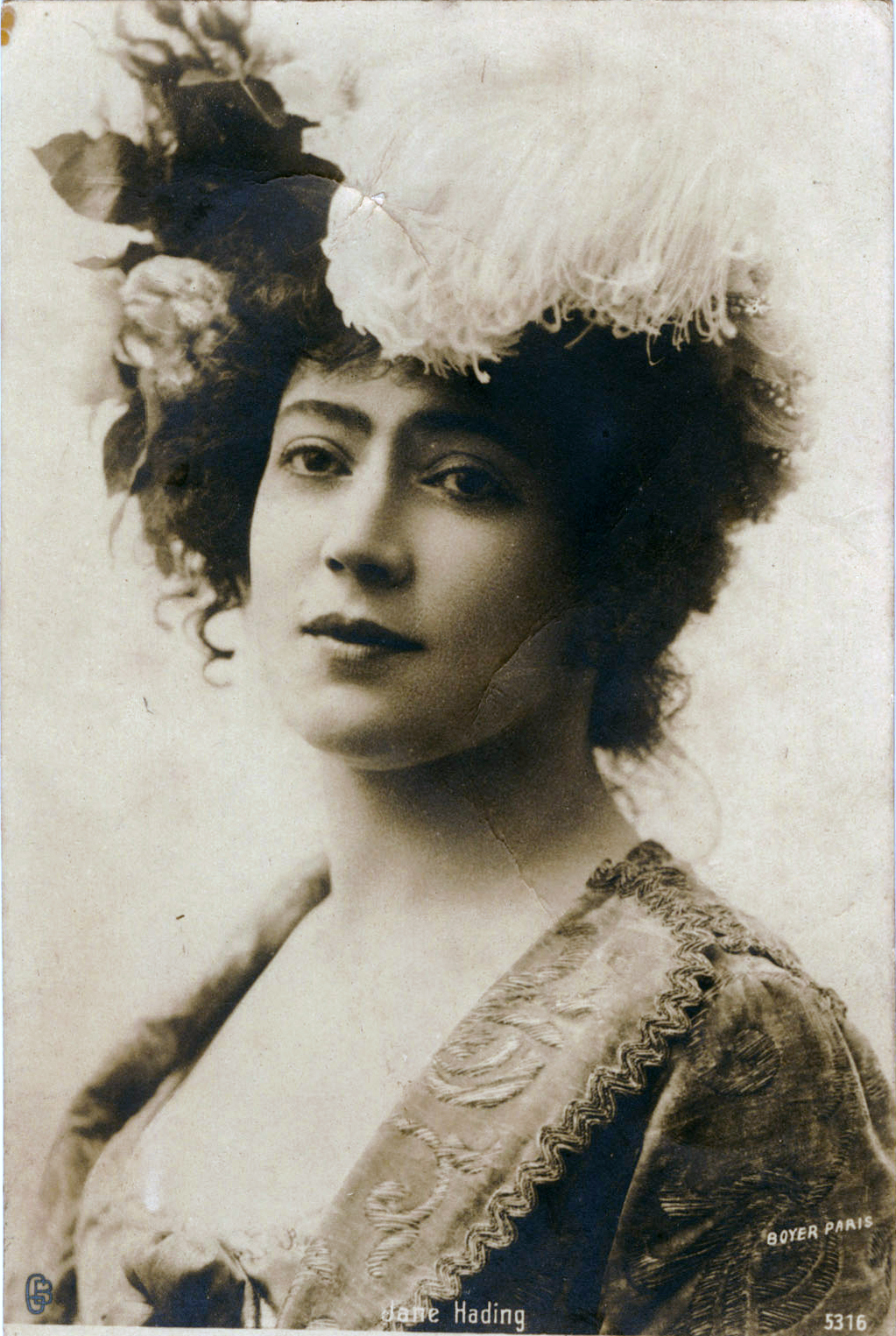
Jane Hading, French actress

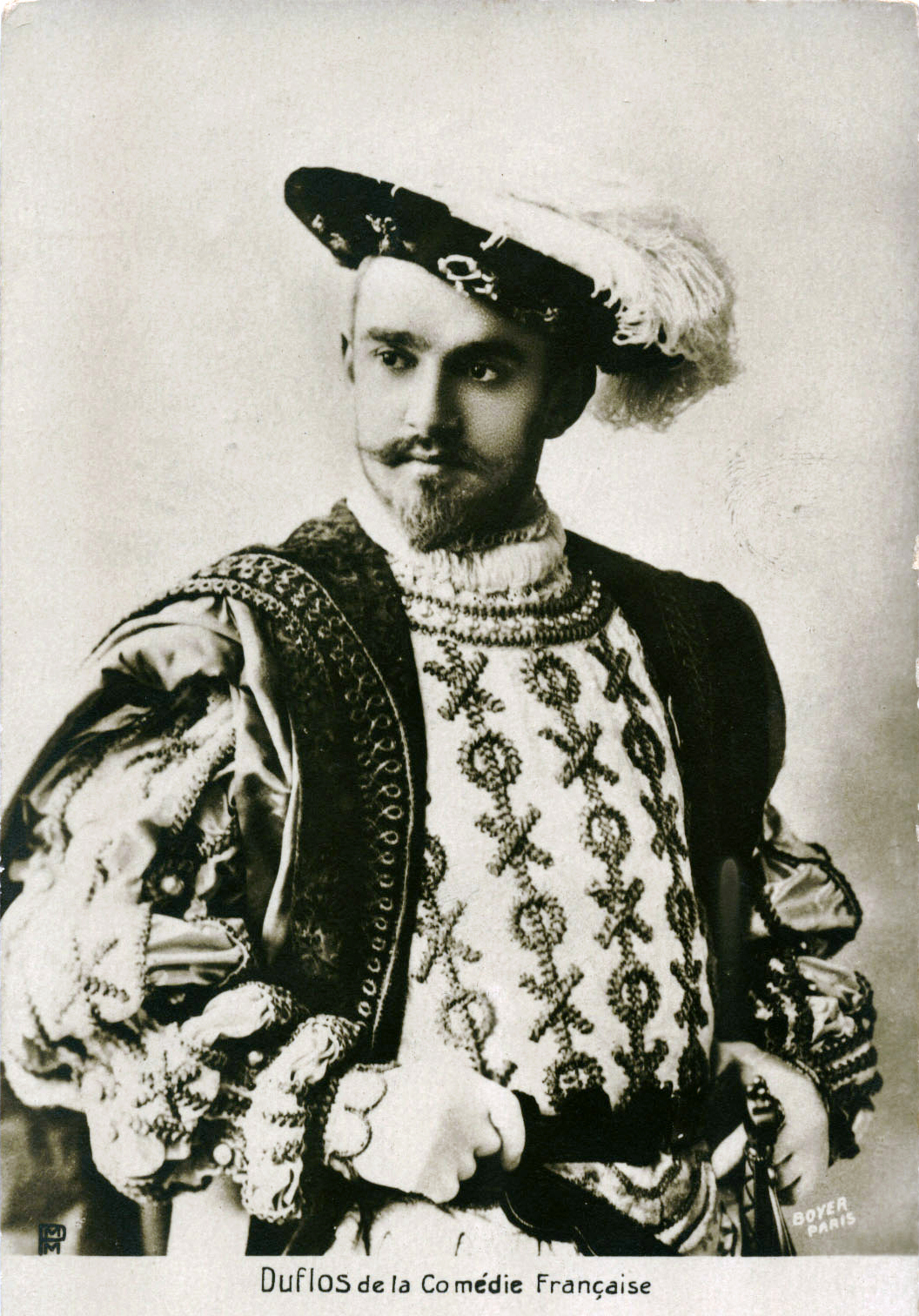
Raphaël Duflos, French actor, from the Comédie-Française

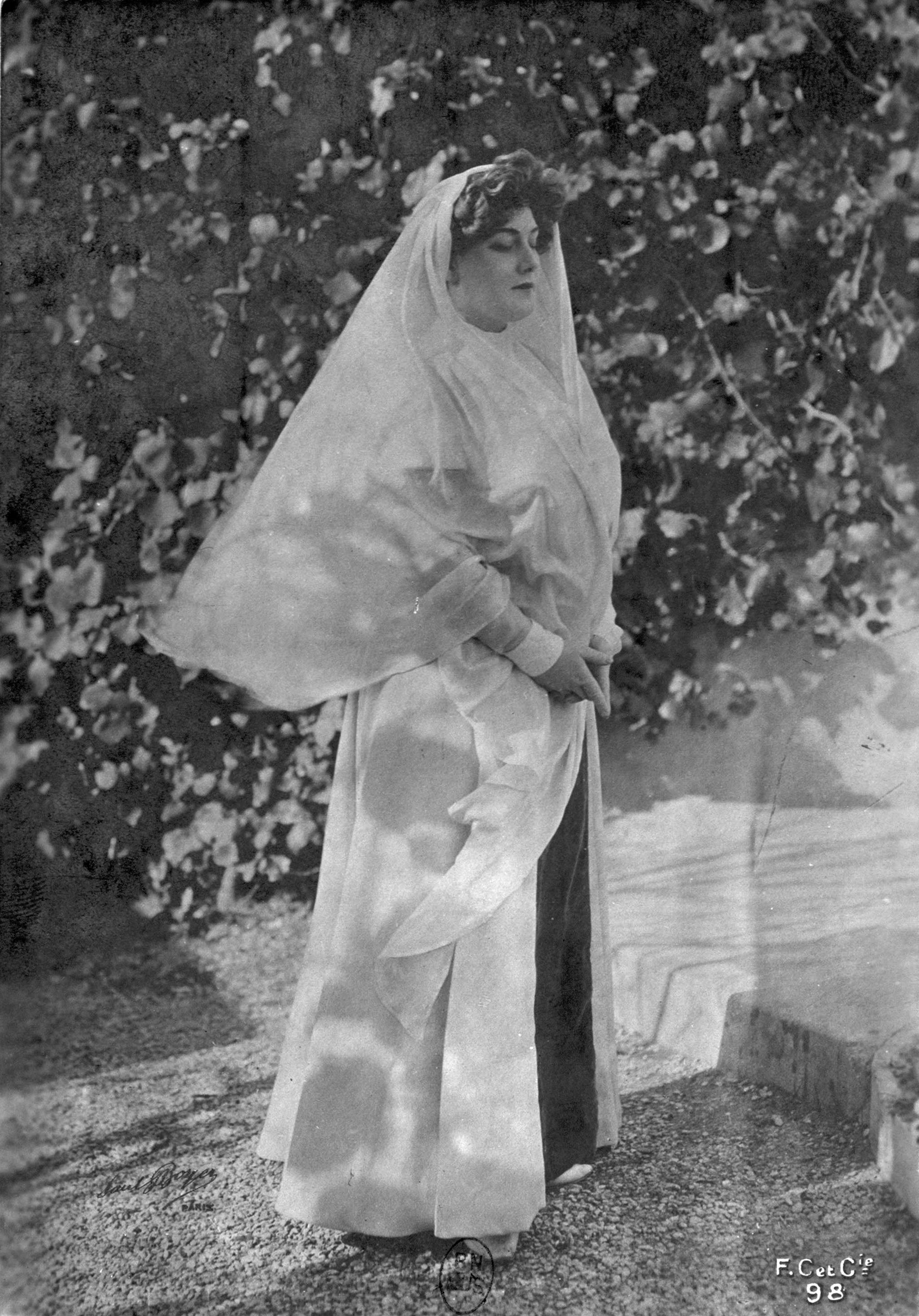
Marguerite Carré, French soprano

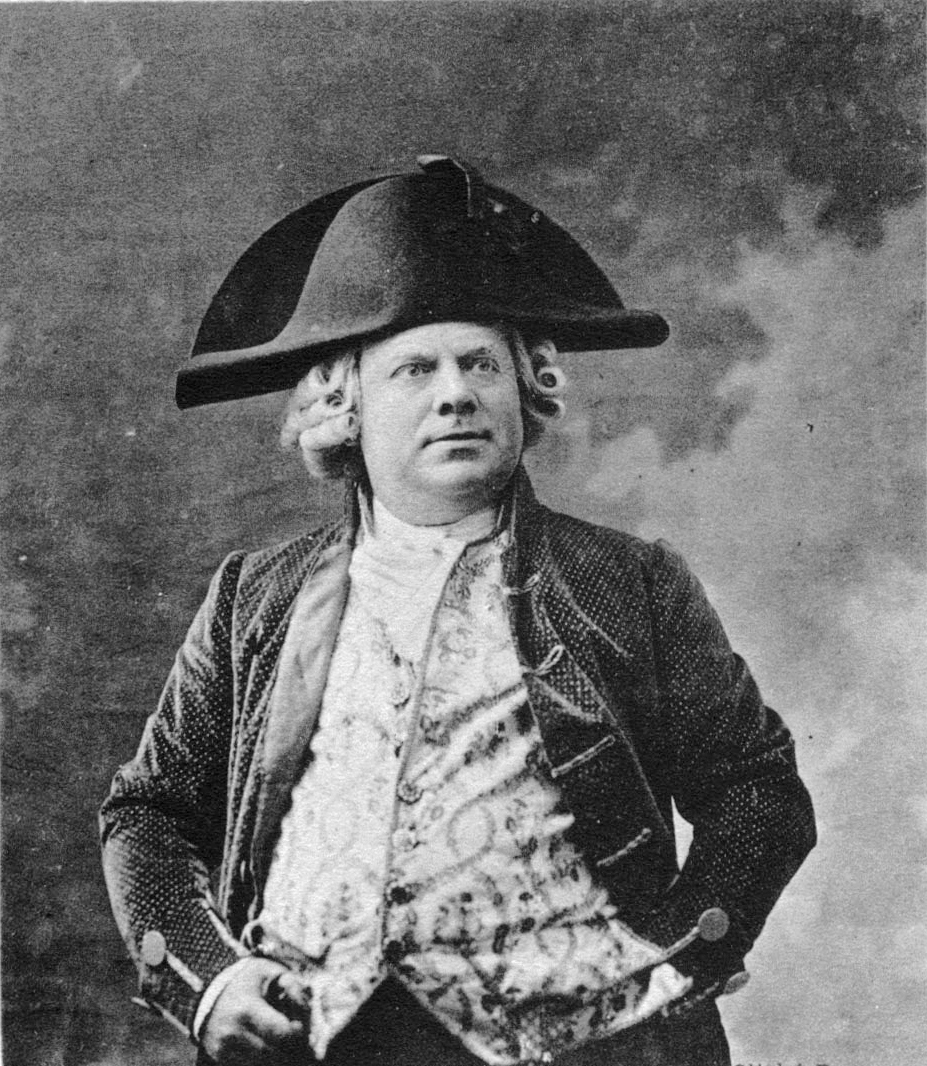
Jean Coquelin, French actor

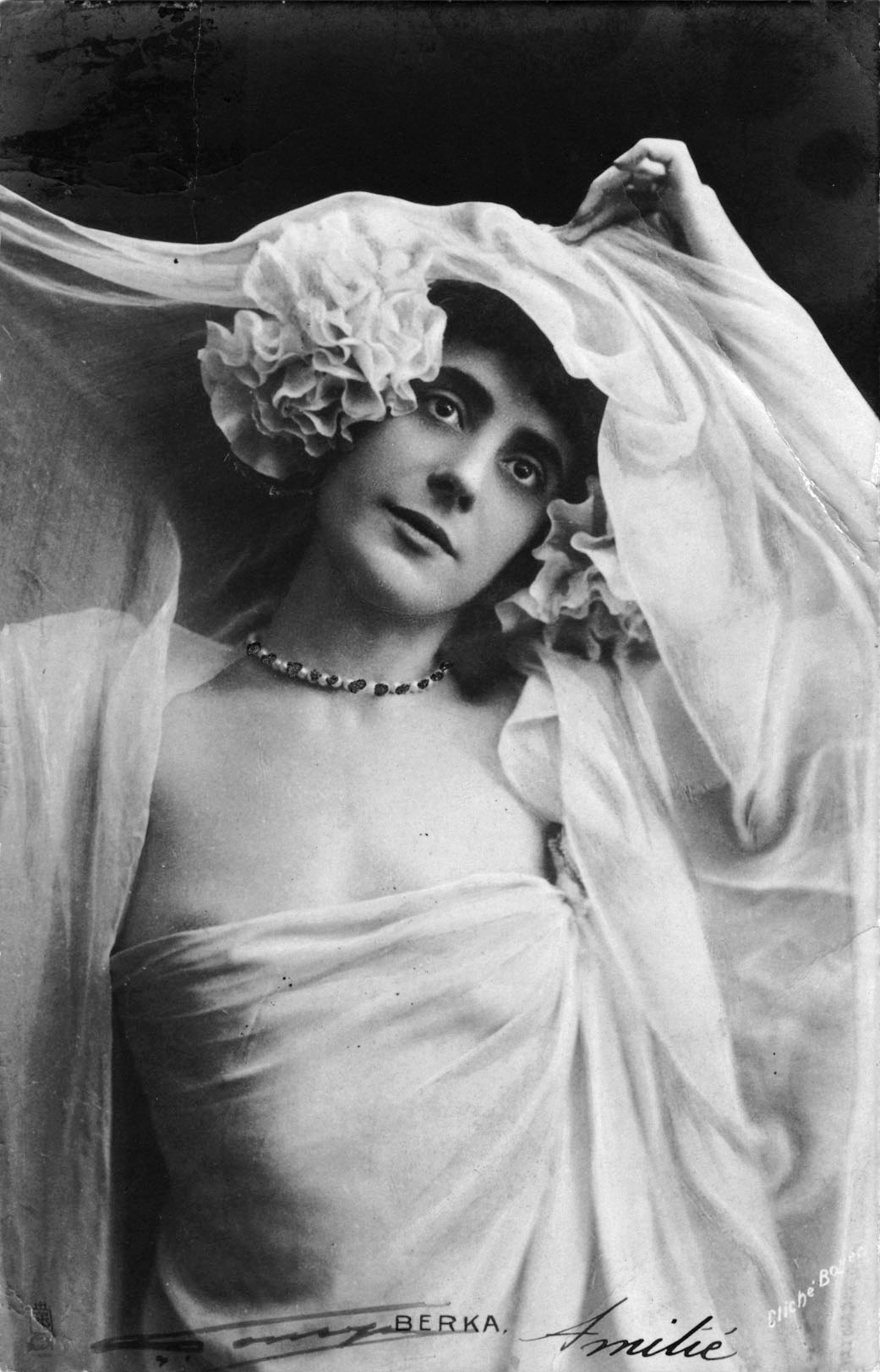
Berka

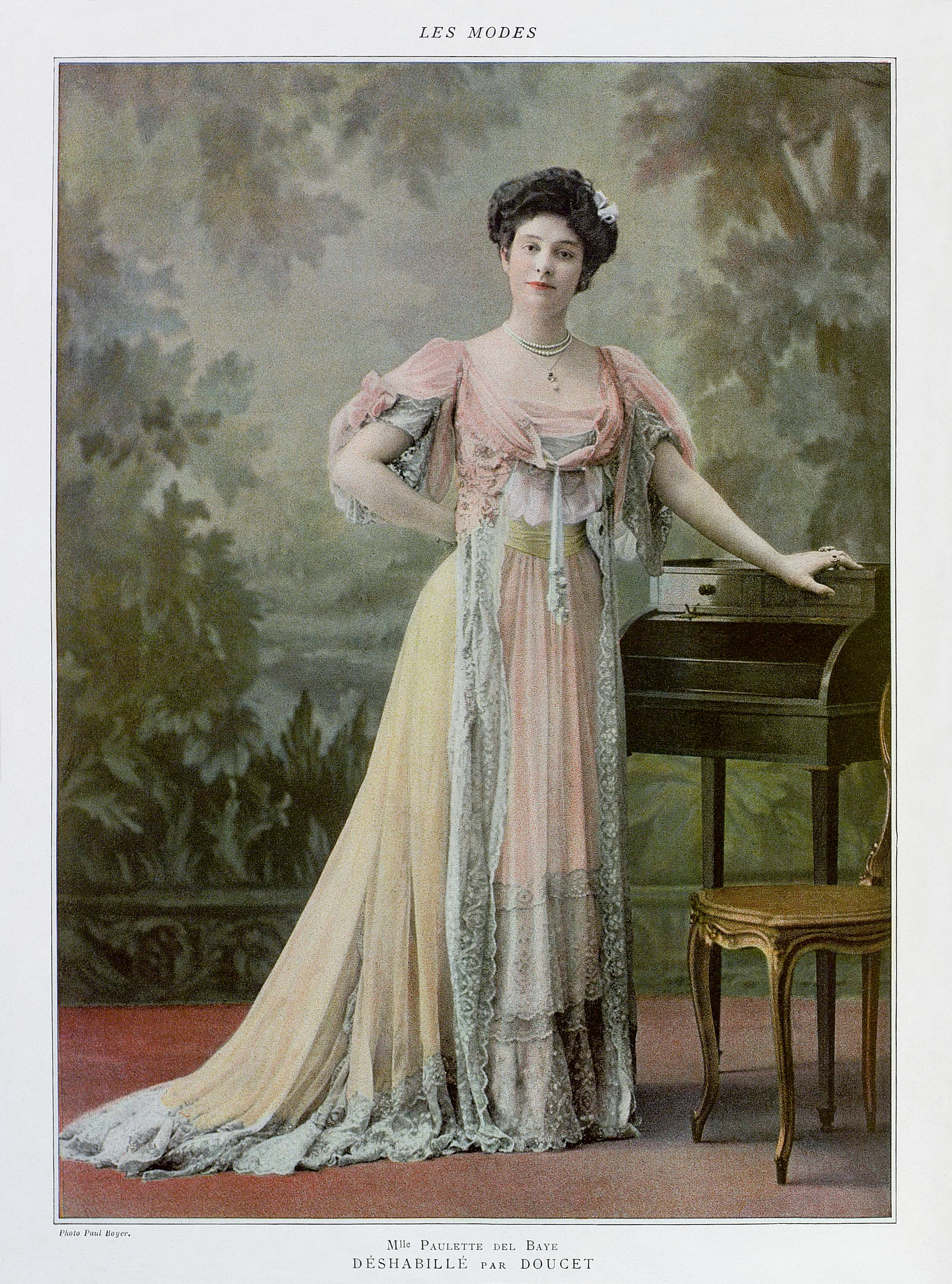
Paulette del Baye, French actress, from Les Modes
