= The First Lady Brendon =

1931 novel

- Author: Robert Hichens
- Language: English
- Genre: Drama
- Publisher: Cassell (Britain); Doubleday (US)
- Publication date: 1931
- Publication place: United Kingdom
- Media type: Print

The First Lady Brendon is a 1931 novel by the British writer Robert Hichens. A woman tries to escape from her disastrous first marriage. Much of the novel takes place in Egypt, a popular setting in the author's novels.

== Bibliography ==
- Vinson, James. Twentieth-Century Romance and Gothic Writers. Macmillan, 1982.
