= The Paradine Case =

1947 film by Alfred Hitchcock

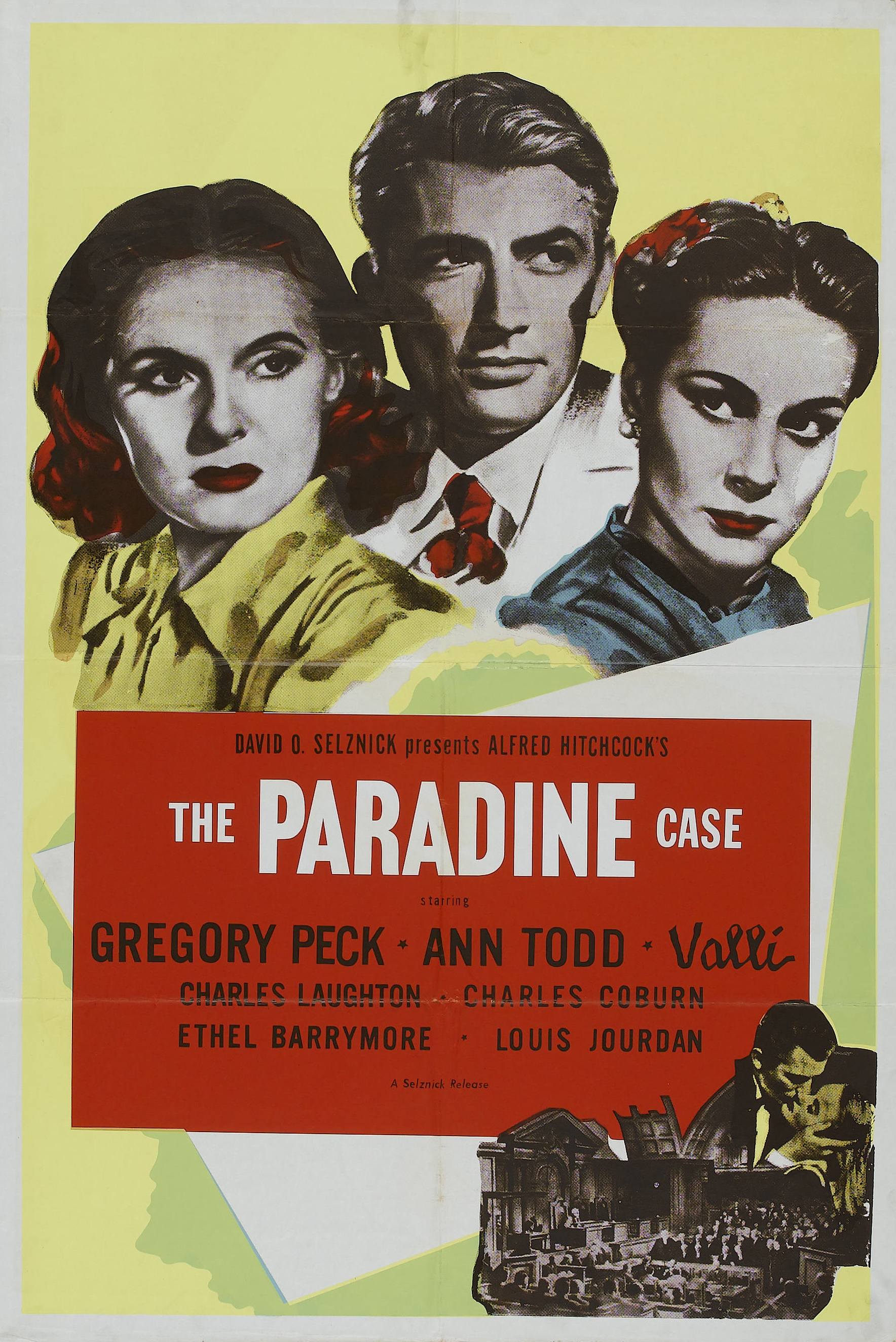
- Theatrical release poster
- Directed by: Alfred Hitchcock
- Screenplay by: Alma Reville; James Bridie; David O. Selznick; Ben Hecht
- Based on: The Paradine Case by Robert Hichens
- Produced by: David O. Selznick
- Starring: Gregory Peck; Ann Todd; Alida Valli; Charles Laughton
- Cinematography: Lee Garmes
- Edited by: Hal C. Kern
- Music by: Franz Waxman; Uncredited: Edward Rebner; Paul Dessau
- Production company: Vanguard Films
- Distributed by: Selznick Releasing Organization
- Release date: December 29, 1947
- Running time: 114 minutes
- Country: United States
- Language: English
- Budget: $4,258,000
- Box office: $2.1 million (worldwide)

The Paradine Case is a 1947 American courtroom drama film with elements of film noir set in England, directed by Alfred Hitchcock and produced by David O. Selznick. Selznick and an uncredited Ben Hecht wrote the screenplay from an adaptation by Alma Reville and James Bridie of the 1933 novel by Robert Smythe Hichens. The film stars Gregory Peck, Ann Todd, Alida Valli, Charles Laughton, Charles Coburn, Ethel Barrymore, and Louis Jourdan. It tells of an English barrister who falls in love with a woman who is accused of murder, and how it affects his relationship with his wife.

== Plot ==
Anna Paradine, an Italian woman living in London, is arrested by the police, who suspect her in the poisoning death of her older, blind husband, a retired colonel.

Mrs. Paradine's solicitor, Sir Simon Flaquer, hires Anthony Keane, a brilliant and successful barrister, to defend her in court. Although Keane has been happily married for eleven years, he becomes deeply infatuated with his client from their first meeting. Keane's wife, Gay, notices his growing obsession, and although he offers to relinquish the case, she presses him to continue. She believes that a "guilty" verdict, followed by Mrs. Paradine's hanging, will mean that she will lose her husband emotionally forever. The only way that she can regain her husband's love and devotion is if he is able to obtain a not guilty verdict for Mrs. Paradine.

Keane starts to focus his legal efforts on Colonel Paradine's French-Canadian manservant, André Latour, DCM & Bar. Keane sees Latour as a scapegoat on whom he can pin the murder, but this strategy backfires. After Keane repeatedly badgers Latour in court, triggering an angry outburst, word comes that Latour has killed himself.

Mrs. Paradine is coldly furious that contrary to her express instructions, Keane has destroyed Latour, who was her lover. In the witness box, she tells Keane that she hates him and that he has murdered the only person she loved, admitting that she poisoned her husband to be with Latour.

Keane is overwhelmed. Attempting to summarize, he improvises a brief and faltering speech, admitting how poorly he has handled the case; unable to continue speaking, he has to leave the court. He stays overnight at Sir Simon's office, knowing that his career is in ruins. Finding him there, Gay offers reconciliation and hope for the future.

== Cast ==
- Gregory Peck as Anthony Keane, counsel for the defense
- Ann Todd as Gay Keane
- Alida Valli as Mrs. Maddalena Anna Paradine (as Valli)
- Charles Laughton as Judge Lord Thomas Horfield
- Charles Coburn as Sir Simon Flaquer, solicitor for the defense
- Joan Tetzel as Judy Flaquer, daughter of Simon Flaquer
- Ethel Barrymore as Lady Sophie Horfield
- Louis Jourdan as André Latour, Col. Paradine's valet
- Leo G. Carroll as Sir Joseph, counsel for the prosecution
- Isobel Elsom as innkeeper
- John Williams as barrister Collins

Cast notes

- It is reported that Hitchcock originally wanted Greta Garbo to play Mrs. Maddalena Anna Paradine, but she turned down the role after the screen test, which allowed Alida Valli to step in for her American film debut. However Hitchcock denied this in a 1972 interview on The Dick Cavett Show. The Paradine Case was also the American film debut of Louis Jourdan. Both Valli and Jourdan hoped that the film would give them the star status in the U.S. that they enjoyed in their home countries (Italy and France, respectively), but that did not happen, though Jourdan later made many U.S. films, even receiving a Golden Globe nomination for his role in Gigi.

== Production ==
David O. Selznick had purchased the rights to Robert Smythe Hichens' novel in 1933, before it was published, when Selznick was still at MGM, with Greta Garbo in mind to star – indeed, Garbo was Hichens' inspiration for the creation of Mrs. Paradine. Garbo did consider doing the film, but ultimately turned it down. She had decided to retire from acting. (Garbo had also turned down I Remember Mama at about the same time, and is reputed to have said "No murderesses, no mamas".)

Howard Estabrook was assigned to write the script at that time, and it was announced that John Barrymore, Lionel Barrymore and Diana Wynyard would star in the film. A draft of the script was submitted by MGM to the censors at the Hays Office, who warned that the script would likely be rejected since Mrs. Paradine was guilty of murder, adultery and perjury, and later committed suicide. They also objected to the judge being portrayed as a sadist who enjoyed sending people to their deaths. A new draft of the script was submitted, but not for some years, in 1942, and this script was approved. In 1946, another version was sent in, and this was also approved after the suicide of Mrs. Paradine was removed from the story.

In 1946, it was announced that Alfred Hitchcock would direct the film, and that Laurence Olivier would star as the barrister, but Olivier eventually turned the project down, as he was preparing for his production of Hamlet. Hitchcock was interested in Ronald Colman for the part as well as Garbo (who had not yet turned down the project) or Ingrid Bergman for Mrs. Paradine. Other actors who were considered for the film include: Maurice Evans, Joseph Cotten, Alan Marshal, James Mason for Anthony Keane; Hedy Lamarr for Mrs. Paradine; Claude Rains for Lord Thomas Horfield; and Robert Newton for Mrs. Paradine's lover. In the end, Hitchcock pushed for Gregory Peck, then at the peak of his box-office appeal; Ann Todd was borrowed from the Rank Organisation to play his wife; and Selznick settled on Alida Valli, considered one of the more promising actresses in the Italian cinema for Mrs. Paradine.

Alfred Hitchcock and Gregory Peck in discussion on the set of The Paradine Case

The Paradine Case was the last film made under Hitchcock's seven-year contract with Selznick, as Hitchcock may have tired of the association by that time. In an interview with François Truffaut, Hitchcock said that he and his wife Alma Reville wrote the first draft of the script together, before bringing in Scottish playwright James Bridie to do some polishing, but that Selznick, dissatisfied with the result, would view the previous day's rushes, do a rewrite, and send the new scenes to the set to be shot. According to his biographer Donald Spoto "...Hitchcock's disgust with the content and method that were forced upon him conspired to produce an uneasy atmosphere from which Hitchcock could scarcely wait to extricate himself." Gregory Peck said of the director, "He seemed really bored with the whole thing..."

The film was in production from December 19, 1946, to May 7, 1947, with retakes done in November of that year. Although some external shots show the Lake District in Cumbria, the rest of the footage was shot on three sets at Selznick's lot in Culver City, California, a first in Selznick's career as an independent producer. Selznick reportedly spared no expense. The set for the courtroom scenes exactly duplicated a courtroom in London's Old Bailey, photographed, with permission, by unit manager Fred Ahern, and built in 85 days at the cost of $80,000. Unusually, the set had ceilings to allow for low camera angles.

For the courtroom sequence, Hitchcock used more than one camera, a technique which had been used in the past, but only to shoot the same subject. Here, Hitchcock used four cameras shooting simultaneously, each focused on one of the principal actors in the scene. This set-up, including elaborately choreographed crane shots, allowed Hitchcock to shoot longer takes of about ten minutes, something he would push to the limit on his next two films, Rope (1948) and Under Capricorn (1949).

The completed film cost an estimated $4,258,000 to make, almost as much as Gone with the Wind. Selznick maintained close supervision on the production, and interfered with Hitchcock's normally carefully budgeted process by demanding extensive re-takes. When Hitchcock insisted on receiving his contractual $1000/day fee, Selznick took over post-production, supervising the editing and the scoring of the film. The producer went through eighteen different title changes for the picture before rechristening it The Paradine Case, just hours before the premiere.

The Paradine Case opened December 29, 1947, in Los Angeles and in two theaters across the street from each other in Westwood, California followed by its New York City premiere on January 8, 1948. The film was initially 132 minutes long, Selznick having editing down Hitchcock's rough cut of almost three hours. Before general release, however, Selznick further reduced the running time to 114 minutes, which is also the current length of the DVD release. In 1980, a flood reportedly destroyed the uncut original version of the film, making a restoration unlikely.

The Paradine Case was not a box office success, worldwide receipts barely covering half of the cost of production.

Hitchcock put in a cameo appearance in most of his films. In this film, he can be seen leaving the Cumberland train station, carrying a cello, at about 38 minutes.

Hitchcock described The Paradine Case as "...a love story embedded in the emotional quicksand of a murder trial".

=== Production credits ===
The production credits on the film were as follows:

- Director – Alfred Hitchcock
- Producer – David O. Selznick
- Writing – David O. Selznick (screenplay), Alma Reville (adaptation)
- Cinematography – Lee Garmes (director of photography)
- Music – Franz Waxman
- Art direction – Joseph McMillan Johnson (production design), Thomas N. Morahan (art director), Joseph B. Platt (interiors), Emile Kuri (set decoration)
- Costumes – Travis Banton (gowns)
- Editor – Hal C. Kern (supervising film editor)
- Sound – James G. Stewart (sound director), Richard Van Hessen (recorder)
- Assistant director – Lowell J. Farrell
- Unit manager – Fred Ahern
- Special effects – Clarence Slifer
- Hair styles – Larry Germain

== Critical reception ==
Bosley Crowther, film critic for The New York Times, liked the film, the acting, and Hitchcock's direction, and wrote, "With all the skill in presentation for which both gentlemen are famed, David O. Selznick and Alfred Hitchcock have put upon the screen a slick piece of static entertainment in their garrulous The Paradine Case... Gregory Peck is impressively impassioned as the famous young London barrister who lets his heart, cruelly captured by his client, rule his head. And Ann Todd, the pliant British actress, is attractively anguished as his wife. Alida Valli, an import from Italy, makes the caged Mrs. Paradine a compound of mystery, fascination and voluptuousness with a pair of bedroom eyes, and Louis Jourdan, a new boy from Paris, is electric as the badgered valet."

Variety wrote, "high dramatics...Hitchcock's penchant for suspense and unusual atmosphere development get full play. There is a deliberateness of pace, artful pauses and other carefully calculated melodramatic hinges upon which he swings the story and players.

Time Out said: "Bleak in its message (those who love passionately inevitably destroy the object of their desire), the movie only half works. The intricate, triangular plot is finally overburdened by the courtroom setting."

In The Nation in 1948, critic James Agee wrote, "Hitchcock uses a lot of skill over a lot of nothing ... The picture never for an instant comes to life. This is the wordiest script since the death of Edmund Burke."

Leonard Maltin said "talk, talk, talk in complicated, stagy courtroom drama;"

Despite the mixed reviews the movie received, most critics noted the strong performances of Ann Todd and Joan Tetzel.

On the review aggregator site Rotten Tomatoes, The Paradine Case has an approval rating of 71% based on 14 reviews.

== Awards and honors ==
Ethel Barrymore was nominated for a 1947 Oscar for Best Supporting Actress as Lady Sophie Horfield.

== Adaptation ==
Lux Radio Theatre broadcast a radio adaptation of the film on 9 May 1949, starring Joseph Cotten, with Alida Valli and Louis Jourdan reprising their roles.

== Sources ==
- The Paradine Case, Hichens Robert, Ernest Benn (1947), ASIN B00178VIDM
- The Complete Films of Alfred Hitchcock, Michael S. Lasky and Robert A. Harris, Citadel Press, ISBN 0-8065-2427-8
