= The Fruitful Vine (novel) =

1911 novel

- Author: Robert Hichens
- Language: English
- Genre: Drama
- Publisher: Unwin
- Publication date: 1911
- Publication place: United Kingdom
- Media type: Print

The Fruitful Vine is a 1911 novel by the British writer Robert Hichens.

== Adaptation ==
In 1921 it was made into a silent film of the same title directed by Maurice Elvey and starring Basil Rathbone.

== Bibliography ==
- Goble, Alan. The Complete Index to Literary Sources in Film. Walter de Gruyter, 1999.
- Vinson, James. Twentieth-Century Romance and Gothic Writers. Macmillan, 1982.
