= Beneath the Magic =

1950 novel by Robert Hichens

- Author: Robert Hichens
- Language: English
- Genre: Drama
- Publisher: Hutchinson (UK); Macrae Smith (US)
- Publication date: 1950
- Publication place: United Kingdom
- Media type: Print

Beneath the Magic is a 1950 novel by the British writer Robert Hichens about a concert pianist. It was released in the United States under the alternative title of Strange Lady. It was one of the final works of Hichens, a romantic novelist whose career stretched back to the Victorian era.

== Bibliography ==
- Vinson, James. Twentieth-Century Romance and Gothic Writers. Macmillan, 1982.
