= An Imaginative Man =

1895 novel

- Author: Robert Hichens
- Language: English
- Genre: Drama
- Publisher: Heinemann
- Publication date: 1895
- Publication place: United Kingdom
- Media type: Print

An Imaginative Man is an 1895 novel by the British writer Robert Hichens. A tale about a young man on holiday in Cairo who after experiencing dissatisfaction with his new wife becomes increasingly obsessed with Great Sphinx, it was a commercial hit and Hichens wrote a number of further books in the orientalist style.

== Bibliography ==
- Sutherland, John. The Stanford Companion to Victorian Fiction. Stanford University Press, 1990.
- Vinson, James. Twentieth-Century Romance and Gothic Writers. Macmillan, 1982.
