= The Voice from the Minaret =

1923 film by Frank Lloyd

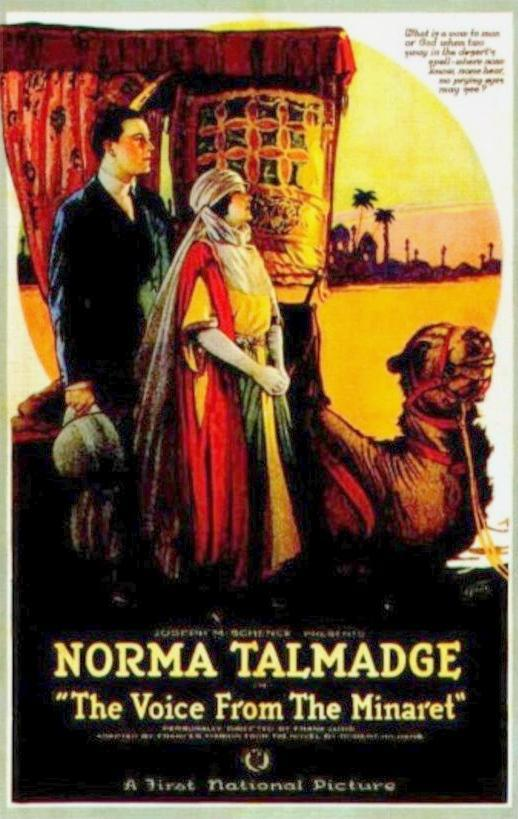
- Theatrical poster
- Directed by: Frank Lloyd
- Written by: Frances Marion
- Based on: The Voice from the Minaret by Robert Smythe Hichens
- Produced by: Joseph M. Schenck
- Starring: Norma Talmadge; Eugene O'Brien; Winter Hall
- Cinematography: Norbert Brodine; Tony Gaudio
- Production company: Norma Talmadge Productions
- Distributed by: Associated First National Pictures
- Release date: January 28, 1923 (Cleveland premiere)
- Running time: 7 reels
- Country: United States
- Language: Silent (English intertitles)

The Voice from the Minaret is a 1923 American silent romantic drama film directed by Frank Lloyd and starring Norma Talmadge, Eugene O'Brien, and Winter Hall. The film is based on the play of the same name by Robert Smythe Hichens (London, Sep 1919). The film is considered lost.

== Plot ==
Lady Adrienne Carlyle leaves Mumbai, where her tyrannical husband, lord Leslie Carlyle, is the governor, heading off to England. On board, Lady Adrienne meets Andrew Fabian, who studies theology to be a priest. Andrew persuades Adrienne to join his pilgrimage to the sacred land. Soon they fall in love, but Adrienne has to return to her husband when she learns about his weakened health. Later on, in England, Adrienne and Leslie meet with Andrew. Suspect Leslie hates Adrienne and Andrew and wants them to confess their love for each other. Shortly thereafter, Lord Carlyle suddenly dies, so Adrienne and Andrew may finally unite.

== Cast ==
- Norma Talmadge as Lady Adrienne Carlyle
- Eugene O'Brien as Andrew Fabian
- Edwin Stevens as Lord Leslie Carlyle
- Winter Hall as Bishop Ellsworth
- Carl Gerard as Secretary Barry
- Claire Du Brey as Countess La Fontaine
- Lillian Lawrence as Lady Gilbert
- Albert Prisco as Seleim
