= December Love =

1922 novel by Robert Hitchens

- Author: Robert Hichens
- Language: English
- Genre: Drama
- Publisher: Cassell (Britain)
- Publication date: 1922
- Publication place: United Kingdom
- Media type: Print

December Love is a 1922 dramatic romance novel by the British writer Robert Hichens.

== Bibliography ==
- Vinson, James. Twentieth-Century Romance and Gothic Writers. Macmillan, 1982.
