= The Garden of Allah (1927 film) =

1927 film by Rex Ingram

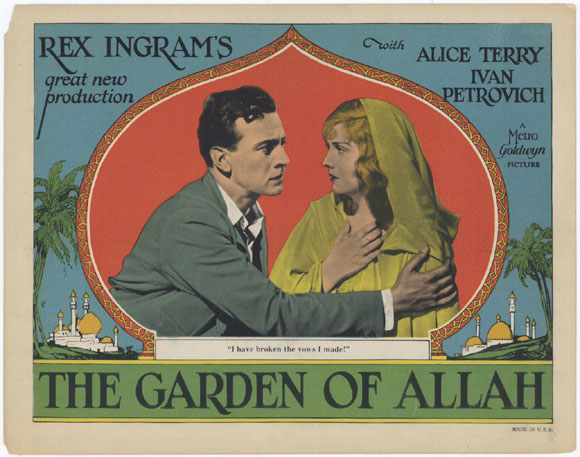
- Film poster
- Directed by: Rex Ingram
- Written by: Willis Goldbeck (scenario); Martin Brown (titles)
- Based on: The Garden of Allah by Robert S. Hichens
- Produced by: Rex Ingram
- Starring: Alice Terry; Iván Petrovich; Marcel Vibert
- Cinematography: Monroe Bennett; Lee Garmes; Marcel Lucien
- Edited by: Arthur Ellis
- Music by: William Axt; Edward Bowes; David Mendoza
- Distributed by: Metro-Goldwyn-Mayer
- Release date: September 2, 1927
- Running time: 96 minutes
- Country: United States
- Languages: Silent Version; Sound (Synchronized); English intertitles
- Box office: $634,450 (USA Gross Total)

The Garden of Allah is a 1927 American silent romantic drama film directed by Rex Ingram, his final film for Metro-Goldwyn-Mayer. The film stars Ingram’s wife, actress Alice Terry and Iván Petrovich. Due to the public's apathy towards silent films, a sound version was prepared and released in 1928. While the sound version has no audible dialog, it features a synchronized musical score with sound effects. The film was released in both sound-on-disc and sound-on-film formats.

This film was the second version of the Robert Hichens 1904 British novel of the same name, which had been filmed by the Selig Polyscope Company in 1916 with Helen Ware and would be filmed again in 1936 with Marlene Dietrich and Charles Boyer.

An incomplete print of The Garden of Allah still exists and is preserved at the Metro-Goldwyn-Mayer/United Artists film archive.

== Plot ==
Father Adrien (Iván Petrovich), a monk at the Trappist monastery of Notre Dame d'Afrique in Algeria, abandons his vows and escapes to the desert, where he meets and rescues Domini (Alice Terry).

== Cast ==
- Alice Terry as Domini Enfilden
- Iván Petrovich as Father Adrien
- Marcel Vibert as Count Anteoni
- H.H. Wright as Lord Rens
- Pâquerette as Suzanne (Credited as Madame Paquerette)
- Gerald Fielding as Batouch
- Armand Dutertre as The Priest of Beni-Mora
- Ben Sadour as The Sand Diviner
- Claude Fielding as Hadj
- Rehba Bent Salah as Ayesha
- Michael Powell as A Tourist

== Music ==
The sound version featured a theme song entitled “Only God and I Know What Is In My Heart” which was composed by William Axt, David Mendoza and Edward Bowes.

== Production ==
The film was shot at a studio in Nice, France, and the desert exteriors were filmed in Biskra, Algeria and Morocco.
