= Robert Wrigley =

American poet and educator (born 1951)

Robert Wrigley (born 1951 in East St. Louis, Illinois) is an American poet and educator.

== Biography ==
In 1971 Wrigley was inducted into the army, filing for discharge as a conscientious objector. He received his M.F.A. in Poetry from the University of Montana in 1976, where he studied under poets Richard Hugo, Madeline DeFrees, and John Haines. From 1987 to 1988 he served as writer-in-residence for the state of Idaho, and has received fellowships from the National Endowment for the Arts, the Idaho State Commission on the Arts, and the Guggenheim Foundation.

His poems have been published in a number of journals, including Poetry, The Atlantic, Barrow Street, and The New Yorker. In 2003 and 2006 he had poems published in Best American Poetry, and in 2013, his poem "Religion" appeared in The Best of the Best American Poetry: 25th Anniversary Edition, selected by Robert Pinsky. Wrigley is also the recipient of seven Pushcart Prizes. Reign of Snakes won the Kingsley Tufts Poetry Award; Lives of the Animals won the 2005 Poets' Prize. In the Bank of Beautiful Sins won the San Francisco Poetry Center Book Award. Box won a 2017 Pacific Northwest Book Award.

Wrigley retired from teaching (in 2016) at the M.F.A. program in creative writing at the University of Idaho, where his wife, Kim Barnes, a memoirist and writer, also taught until her retirement in 2020.

== Bibliography ==
- The Sinking of Clay City (1979)
- The Glow (1982) (chapbook)
- Three broadsides - "The Beliefs of a Horse", "A Preference in Birds", "Surfaces" (1984)
- Moon in a Mason Jar (1986)
- In the Dark Pool (1987) (chapbook)
- What My Father Believed (1991)
- In the Bank of Beautiful Sins (1995)
- Reign of Snakes (1999)
- Clemency (2002) (chapbook)
- Lives of the Animals (2003)
- Earthly Meditations: New and Selected Poems (Penguin Group, 2006)
- Beautiful Country (2010)
- After a Rainstorm (2010)
- Anatomy of Melancholy & Other Poems (2013)
- The Church of Omnivorous Light: Selected Poems (2013, UK)
- Box (2017)
- Nemerov's Door: Essays (2021)
- The True Account of Myself As a Bird (2022)
