= The Paradine Case (novel) =

1933 novel by Robert Hichens

- First edition
- Author: Robert Hichens
- Language: English
- Genre: Drama
- Publisher: Ernest Benn Limited
- Publication date: 1933
- Publication place: United Kingdom
- Media type: Print

The Paradine Case is a 1933 novel by the British writer Robert Hichens. In the novel, Colonel Paradine, V.C., a blinded war veteran of social prominence, has died of poisoning and his wife has been charged with his murder. The married London barrister who defends the accused wife becomes deeply infatuated with her.

The book is based in part on the murder of James Maybrick, whose much younger wife, Florie, was convicted of poisoning him in 1889 with arsenic; there were infidelities on both sides of the marriage. Hitchens also used elements of an even more sensational trial, that of the Marguerite Alibert, wife of Prince Aly Kamel Fahmy Bey, who in 1922 fatally shot her husband at the Savoy Hotel.

In 1947, the novel served as the basis of the Alfred Hitchcock film The Paradine Case starring Gregory Peck, Ann Todd, Alida Valli and Charles Laughton.
