= The Voice from the Minaret (play) =

1919 play

- Original language: English
- Written by: Robert Hichens
- Genre: Drama
- Setting: Damascus, London

Premiere
- Date: September 1919
- Place: Globe Theatre, London

The Voice from the Minaret is a play by the British writer Robert Hichens. It premiered at the Globe Theatre in London's West End in 1919, with a cast including Marie Lohr, Arthur Wontner, Henry Vibart, Norman McKinnel, George Hayes and Vane Featherston. In 1922 it was staged on Broadway at the Hudson Theatre with Lohr and Herbert Marshall heading the cast, and Edmund Gwenn receiving the best reviews.

== Synopsis ==
An unhappily married woman falls for a handsome religious student and has a brief romance before he dedicates himself to a career in the church.

== Film adaptation ==
In 1923 it was adapted into an American silent film The Voice from the Minaret directed by Frank Lloyd and starring Norma Talmadge, Eugene O'Brien and Winter Hall.

== Bibliography ==
- Bordman, Gerald. American Theatre: A Chronicle of Comedy and Drama 1914-1930. Oxford University Press, 1995.
- Goble, Alan. The Complete Index to Literary Sources in Film. Walter de Gruyter, 1999.
