= Paulette del Baye =

French-Cuban stage and film actress

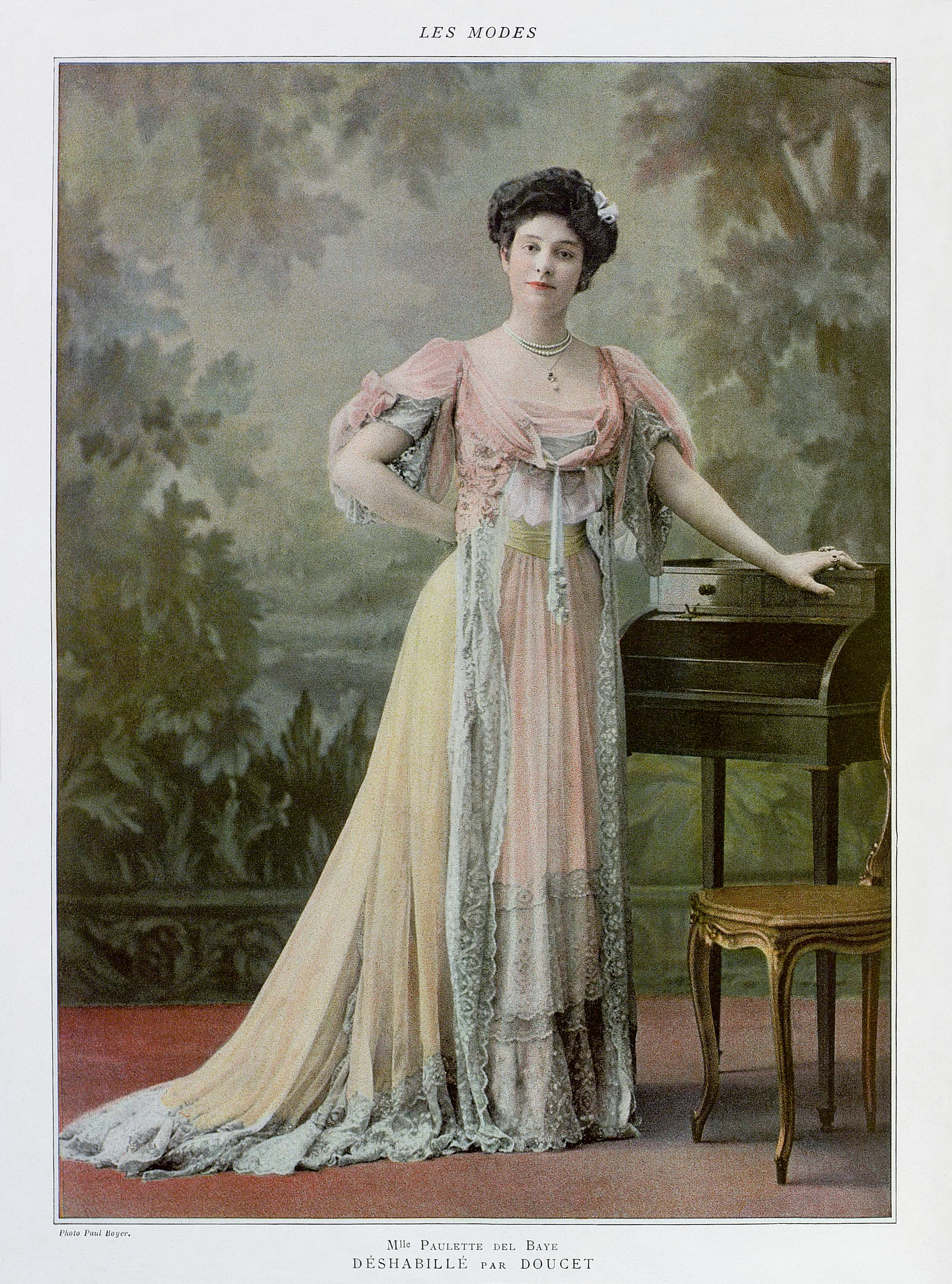
- Paulette del Baye, photographed by Paul Boyer, from the March 1907 issue of Les Modes
- Born: Catalina Francisca Paulina Batalla; 1877; Cuba
- Died: 23 May 1945 (aged 67–68); Harrow, Middlesex, England
- Other names: Paulette del Bay, Paulette Delbay, Comtesse de Brioude
- Occupation: actress

Paulette del Baye (1877 – 23 May 1945), born Catalina Francisca Paulina Batalla, was a French actress, singer, dancer and vaudeville performer from Cuba.

== Career ==
Paulette del Baye performed as "La commère au bois" in the revue at the Moulin Rouge in 1904. "Paulette del Baye est une comédienne fine, une chanteuse spirituelle, une danseuse exquise, qui fait de véritables tours de force d'art en souriant," said one report about the revue. She created the role of "Zézé" in Vous n'avez rien a declarer? (1906) at the Théâtre des Nouveautés, and also appeared in Les plaques de l'Année (1906) in Paris. In London, she was seen in More (1916), Arlette (1917), and The Passing Show of 1918 (1918). In 1917 a comic opera was based on her life, and named Paulette del Baye.

Paulette del Baye's film credits included four silent pictures from 1921: Greatheart, Frailty, The Fruitful Vine, and The Woman with the Fan; she also appeared in the Sherlock Holmes adventure The Man with the Twisted Lip.

== Other activities ==
In 1909, she was one of the "fair actresses" implicated in a plot to restore the French monarchy, "but in these days of automobiles and swift yachts," one report explained, "it is exceedingly difficult to follow the lead of the young and charming Mlle. del Baye".

== Personal life ==
Paulette del Baye held the title Comtesse de Brioude. She died in England in 1945.
