= Barbary Sheep (film) =

1917 film by Maurice Tourneur

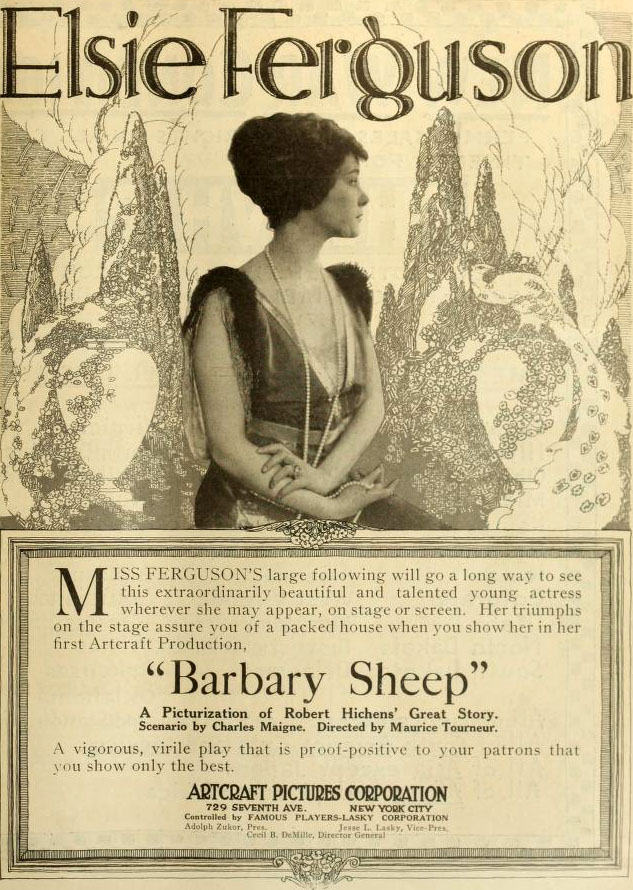
- Newspaper advertisement.
- Directed by: Maurice Tourneur
- Written by: Charles Maigne (scenario)
- Based on: Barbary Sheep by Robert Hichens
- Produced by: Adolph Zukor; Jesse Lasky
- Starring: Elsie Ferguson
- Cinematography: John van den Broek
- Distributed by: Artcraft Pictures
- Release date: September 10, 1917
- Running time: 5 reels
- Country: United States
- Language: Silent (English intertitles)

Barbary Sheep is a 1917 American silent drama film produced by Famous Players–Lasky and distributed through Artcraft Pictures, an affiliate of Paramount Pictures. The film was directed by Maurice Tourneur and stars Elsie Ferguson in her motion picture debut. This picture is said to have George M. Cohan in his film debut as well. It is an adaptation of the 1907 novel Barbary Sheep by British writer Robert Hichens. It was thought to be a lost film until an 8-minute clip or fragment was found in the Gosfilmfond archive.

== Plot ==
As described in a film magazine, following the close of the London social season, Katharine suggests to her husband that they take a trip to Africa, and when Sir Claude learns that there is excellent hunting, the pair book passage. Out in the desert Katharine meets Benchaalal, who is proud of his conquests of the feminine tourists. In the moonlight of the beautiful desert Benchaalal declares his love for Katharine. Sir Claude, through accident, learns of Benchaalal and returns home unexpectedly from a hunting expedition. Not finding Katharine in the apartment, he becomes suspicious and going out on the mountain sees Benchaalal and Katharine in the desert below. Benchaalal endeavors to take Katharine into his arms, but Katharine frees herself from the undesired embrace. Sir Charles is about to fire upon Benchaalal when the man is killed by a crazed merchant. Reconciliation and a happy reunion take place between Sir Claude and Katharine.

== Cast ==
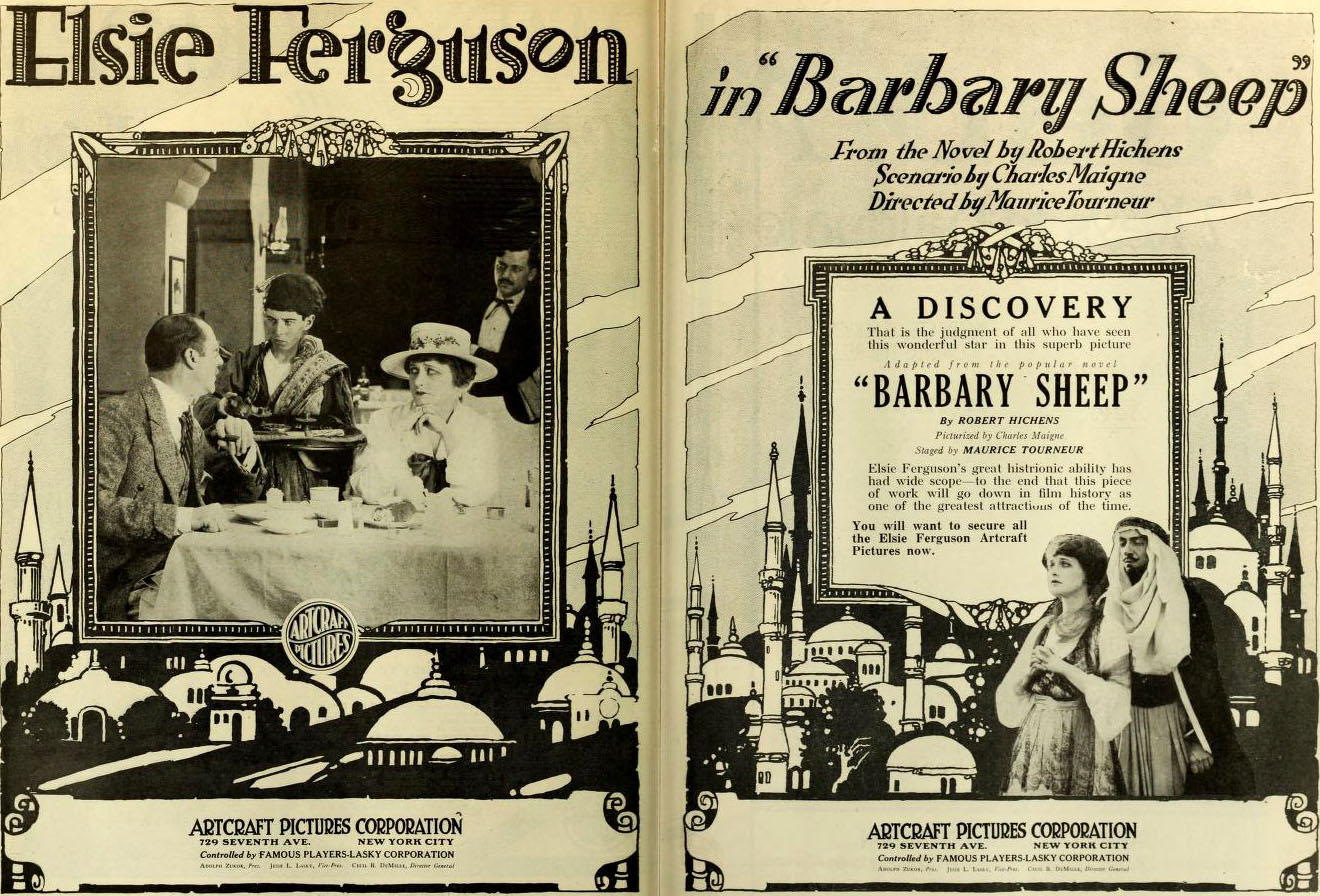
Advertisement

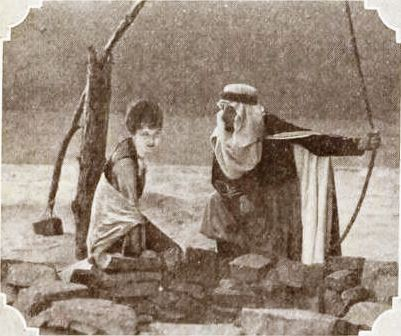
a scene in the film.

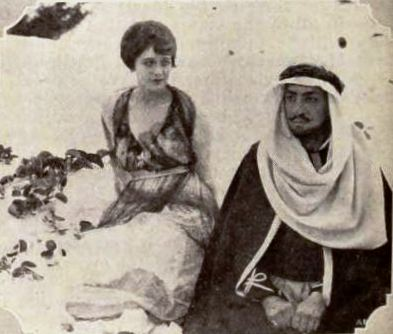
a scene in the film.

- Elsie Ferguson as Lady Katharine 'Kitty' Wyverne
- Lumsden Hare as Sir Claude Wyverne
- Pedro de Cordoba as Benchaalal
- Macey Harlam as Archmed
- Alex Shannon as The old Marabout
- Maude George as The innkeeper (credited as Maude Ford)
- Frances Ross (uncredited)

== Production ==
Some scenes in Barbary Sheep were filmed near the Skyland Resort in what is now Shenandoah National Park.

== Reception ==
Like many American films of the time, Barbary Sheep was subject to cuts by city and state film censorship boards. The Chicago Board of Censors ordered cut from Reel 3 the scene of a vision of the woman's murder, from Reel 5 intertitles such as "The Arab is faithless - and to satisfy his lust," and from Reel 6 the intertitle "The son of the desert, fired by his passion, scornful of a husband who has kept no watch over his own," and the vision of the woman's murder.
