= W. Howard Greene =

American cinematographer (1895–1956)

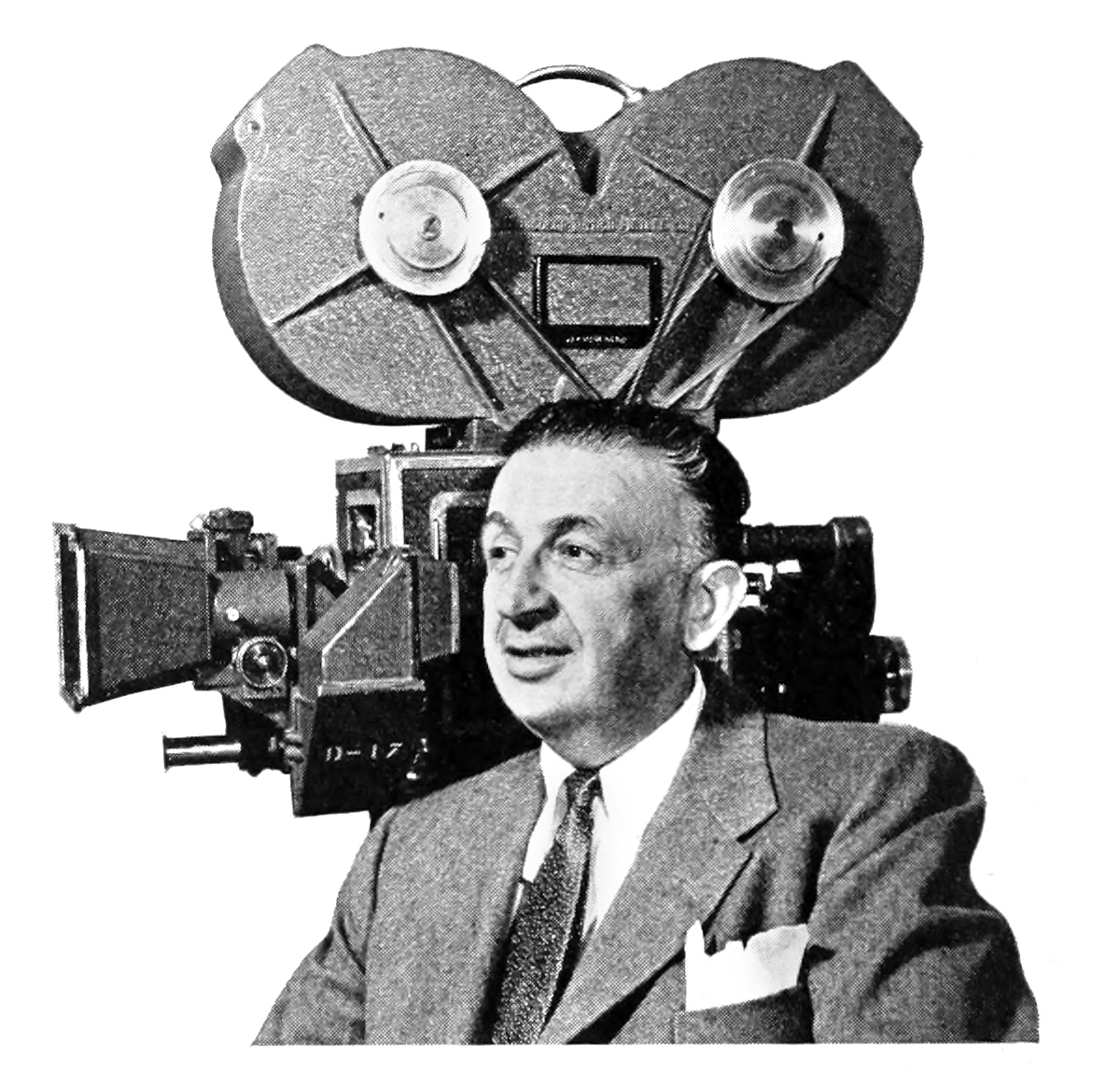
W. Howard Greene in 1941

William Howard Greene (1895–1956) was an American cinematographer.

== Career ==
Greene was a cinematographer on many early Technicolor films, including Legong: Dance of the Virgins (1935) and A Star Is Born (1937).

== Awards ==
- 1937: Special Academy Award (with Harold Rosson) for color cinematography, The Garden of Allah (1936)
- 1938: Special Academy Award for color cinematography, A Star Is Born (1937)
- 1944: Academy Award for Best Cinematography, Color, Phantom of the Opera (1943)
