= Daniel Airlie =

1937 novel

- First edition (US)
- Author: Robert Hichens
- Language: English
- Genre: Drama
- Publisher: Cassell (UK); Doubleday, Doran (US)
- Publication date: 1937
- Publication place: United Kingdom
- Media type: Print

Daniel Airlie is a 1937 novel by the British writer Robert Hichens.

In the book, "Airlie is an actor, trying to live down a secret in his past and when he realizes it can't be done, trying to make it right in the one medium he can control, the stage".

A review in Kirkus Reviews found the book to be "spun out to undue length", but "reasonably good entertainment".

== Bibliography ==
- Vinson, James. Twentieth-Century Romance and Gothic Writers. Macmillan, 1982.
