= A New Way of Life =

1942 novel

- First US edition
- Author: Robert Hichens
- Language: English
- Genre: Drama
- Publisher: Hutchinson (Britain); Doubleday (US)
- Publication date: 1942
- Publication place: United Kingdom
- Media type: Print

A New Way of Life is a 1942 novel by the British writer Robert Hichens. Like many of his works, it is set in North Africa in the Sahara Desert.

== Bibliography ==
- Vinson, James. Twentieth-Century Romance and Gothic Writers. Macmillan, 1982.
