= The Spell of Egypt =

1910 travel book

- Author: Robert Hichens
- Language: English
- Genre: Travel
- Publication date: 1910
- Publication place: United Kingdom
- Media type: Print

The Spell of Egypt is a 1910 travel book by the British writer Robert Hichens. It was originally published in 1908 as Egypt and Its Monuments. Hichens was known for his orientalist writing, and Egypt was a setting for several of his novels.

== Bibliography ==
- Hsu-Ming Teo. Desert Passions: Orientalism and Romance Novels. University of Texas Press, 2012.
