= The Power to Kill =

1934 novel

The Power To Kill
- Author: Robert Hichens
- Language: English
- Genre: Drama
- Publisher: Benn (Britain); Doubleday, Doran (US)
- Publication date: 1934
- Publication place: United Kingdom
- Media type: Print

The Power To Kill is a 1934 novel by the British writer Robert Hichens.

== Bibliography ==
- Vinson, James. Twentieth-Century Romance and Gothic Writers. Macmillan, 1982.
