= Barbary Sheep (novel) =

1907 novel by Robert Hichens

- Author: Robert Hichens
- Language: English
- Genre: Drama
- Publisher: Methuen (UK); Harper (US)
- Publication date: 1907
- Publication place: United Kingdom
- Media type: Print

Barbary Sheep is a 1907 novel by the British writer Robert Hichens; in common with much of the author's work, it has a North African setting.

== Film adaptation ==
In 1917, it was turned into a silent film Barbary Sheep directed by Maurice Tourneur and starring Elsie Ferguson, made by Paramount Pictures.

== Bibliography ==
- Goble, Alan. The Complete Index to Literary Sources in Film. Walter de Gruyter, 1999.
- Vinson, James. Twentieth-Century Romance and Gothic Writers. Macmillan, 1982.
