= The Way of Ambition =

1913 novel

- Author: Robert Hichens
- Language: English
- Genre: Drama
- Publisher: Methuen
- Publication date: 1913
- Publication place: United Kingdom
- Media type: Print

The Way of Ambition is a 1913 novel by the British writer Robert Hichens. An young woman marries a musical genius and ambitiously manages his career.

== Bibliography ==
- Vinson, James. Twentieth-Century Romance and Gothic Writers. Macmillan, 1982.
