= The Fruitful Vine =

1921 film

- Directed by: Maurice Elvey
- Written by: Leslie Howard Gordon
- Based on: The Fruitful Vine by Robert Hichens
- Starring: Basil Rathbone; Valia; Irene Rooke
- Production company: Stoll Pictures
- Distributed by: Stoll Pictures
- Release date: September 1921
- Country: United Kingdom
- Languages: Silent; English intertitles

The Fruitful Vine is a 1921 British silent drama film directed by Maurice Elvey and starring Basil Rathbone, Valia and Irene Rooke. From the silent era, probably the most notable thing about the film was an early appearance of British actor Rathbone, who was later to become famous for his portrayal of Sherlock Holmes. It is an adaptation of the 1911 novel The Fruitful Vine by Robert Hichens.

== Cast ==
- Teddy Arundell as Francis Denzil
- Peter Dear as Theo Denzil
- Paulette del Baye as Princess Mancelli
- Mary Dibley as Edna Denzil
- Robert English as Sir Theodore Cannynge
- Basil Rathbone as Don Cesare Carelli
- Fred Raynham as Dr. Mervynn Ides
- Irene Rooke as Lady Sarah Ides
- Valia as Dolores Cannynge

== Bibliography ==
- Goble, Alan. The Complete Index to Literary Sources in Film. Walter de Gruyter, 1999.
