= The Journey Up =

1938 novel

- First edition (US)
- Author: Robert Hichens
- Language: English
- Genre: Drama
- Publisher: Cassell (UK); Doubleday, Doran (US)
- Publication date: 1938
- Publication place: United Kingdom
- Media type: Print

The Journey Up is a 1938 novel by the British writer Robert Hichens.

== Bibliography ==
- Vinson, James. Twentieth-Century Romance and Gothic Writers. Macmillan, 1982.
