= Call of the Blood (1948 film) =

1948 Italian film by John Clements and Ladislao Vajda

- John Justin and Kay Hammond
- Directed by: John Clements; Ladislao Vajda
- Written by: Basil Mason; Fabrizio Sarazani; Ákos Tolnay; John Clements
- Based on: The Call of the Blood by Robert Hichens
- Produced by: Steven Pallos; John Stafford
- Starring: John Clements; Kay Hammond; John Justin; Hilton Edwards
- Cinematography: Ubaldo Arata; Wilkie Cooper
- Edited by: Carmen Beliaeff
- Music by: Ludovico Lunghi
- Production companies: British Lion; F.I.A.I.
- Distributed by: British Lion (UK)
- Release date: 12 February 1948
- Running time: 88 minutes
- Countries: Italy; United Kingdom
- Language: English
- Budget: £66,295
- Box office: £45,713 (UK as at 30 June 1949)

Call of the Blood (also known as Il Richiamo Del Sangue) is a 1948 British-Italian drama film directed by John Clements and Ladislao Vajda and starring Clements, Kay Hammond and John Justin. It was written by Basil Mason, Fabrizio Sarazani, Ákos Tolnay and Clements based on the 1906 novel of the same title by Robert Hichens.

== Plot ==
In the Edwardian era, British newly-weds David and Anne Erskine move to Sicily where David has an affaire with fisherman's daughter Maddelena. When she takes her own life, her father murders David.

== Cast ==
- John Clements as Julius Ikon
- Kay Hammond as Doctor Anne Lester
- John Justin as David Erskine
- Hilton Edwards as Doctor Robert Blake
- Robert Rietti as Gaspare
- Carlo Ninchi as Salvatore
- Lea Padovani as Maddelena
- Jelo Filippo as Sebastiono
- H.G. Stoker as Uncle Ben
- Keith Pyott as Doctor Sabatier
- Marcesa Faciacani as Lucretia

== Production ==
The film's sets were designed by art director Maurice Fowler. Elizabeth Haffenden was the costume designer.

== Reception ==
=== Boxoffice ===
As of 30 June 1949 the film earned £45,713 in the UK of which £33,401 went to the producer.

=== Critical ===
The Monthly Film Bulletin wrote: "Even the shots of lovely ltalian scenery cannot make this anything but a heavily over-acted, slow-moving film, with Kay Hammond hopelessly miscast as the understanding wife-cum-doctor; and John Justin behaving like an overgrown schoolboy as the husband whose Sicilian blood gets the better of him. Not for an instant does he really give the impression that the Sicilian in him is getting out of hand. John Clements' direction is not redeemed by his own skilful performance as Ikon, which obtrudes too much into the limelight. For brief, memorable moments the Sicily of Hichens' novel is recaptured, but somewhere all the spirit, the essential vitality of his story, has been lost."

Kine Weekly wrote: "Vague, old-fashioned, over-acted and heavily dialogued ... John Clements, who combines the roles of director, part-scriptwriter and leading player, seems so insistent upon keeping his own part in the limelight that balance is destroyed. The author's meaning completely hidden, the play amounts to little more than a farrago of dusty clichés and platitudes. How they came to make the outworn hokum we'll never know. The best part of the film is its authentic Italian settings, which oddly enough frequently look phoney."

Picturegoer wrote: "It is a theatrical affair, much too much talk, and tending to be over-acted. Kay Hammond does not seem happy in the role of the doctor, and John Justin is weak as her husband."

Variety wrote: "Little entertainment in this outmoded adaptation of Robert Hichens' dated novel."

== See also ==
- The Call of the Blood (1920)

== Bibliography ==
- Harper, Sue. Picturing the Past: The Rise and Fall of the British Costume Film. British Film Institute, 1994.
