= Kim Barnes =

American author

- Born: 1958 (age 67–68); Lewiston, Idaho, U.S.
- Occupations: Novelist, essayist
- Spouse: Robert Wrigley

Kim Barnes (born 1958 in Lewiston, Idaho) is a contemporary American author of fiction, memoir, and personal essays. She served as Poet Laureate of Idaho.

== Life ==
She returned with her mother to their logging camp on Orofino Creek in the Clearwater National Forest, where her father worked as a lumberjack. For the next twelve years, she and her family lived in small communities and cedar camps in northern Idaho—Pierce, Headquarters, and a number of places along the North Fork of the Clearwater River. In 1970, her family moved to Lewiston, Idaho, where Barnes graduated from Lewiston High School in 1976.

Barnes received her B.A. in English from Lewis-Clark State College in 1983, her M.A. in English from Washington State University in 1985, and her M.F.A. in Creative Writing from the University of Montana in 1995. Barnes teaches creative writing at the University of Idaho, and lives with her husband, Robert Wrigley, a poet, in Idaho. They have three children.

Barnes's creative works addresses subjects including the American West, religious fundamentalism, women's issues, logging, and the environment, and reflects her interest in feminist interpretations of mythology and Jungian archetypes. In A Country Called Home, one of her main characters has the condition known as synesthesia and sees color when she hears music.

Her work has appeared widely in anthologies and journals, including The Georgia Review, Shenandoah, MORE Magazine, and the Pushcart Prize anthology.

Barnes appeared on the Lit Hub/Podglomerate podcast Storybound.

== Awards ==
She is the recipient of two grants from the Idaho Commission on the Arts. In 1995, she was chosen to receive the PEN/Jerard fellowship given to an emerging woman writer of nonfiction. In 1997, she was honored with a Pacific Northwest Booksellers Association Award for In the Wilderness, which was also a finalist for the Pulitzer Prize, and the Quality Paperback Book Club's New Visions Award. From 2004 to 2007, she served as Idaho Writer-in-Residence.

== Published work ==
=== Memoirs ===
- Barnes, Kim (1996). In the Wilderness: Coming of Age in Unknown Country. Doubleday Books, Anchor. ISBN 978-0-385-47821-2.
- Barnes, Kim (2000). Hungry for the World: A Memoir. Villard. ISBN 978-0-375-50228-6.

=== Novels ===
- Barnes, Kim (2003). Finding Caruso. Putnam. ISBN 978-0-399-14967-2.
- Barnes, Kim (2008). A Country Called Home. Alfred A. Knopf. ISBN 978-0-307-26895-2.
- Barnes, Kim (2012). In the Kingdom of Men. Alfred A. Knopf. ISBN 978-0-307-27339-0.

=== Editor ===
- Barnes, Kim; Clearman Blew, Mary, eds. (2001). Circle of Women: An Anthology of Contemporary Western Women Writers. University of Oklahoma Press. ISBN 978-0-8061-3367-6.
- Barnes, Kim; Davis, Claire, eds. (Mar 21, 2006). Kiss tomorrow Hello: Notes from the Midlife Underground by Twenty-Five Women Over Forty. Doubleday Books. ISBN 978-0385515412.
