= The Call of the Blood (novel) =

1906 novel

- Author: Robert Hichens
- Language: English
- Genre: Drama
- Publisher: Methuen (UK); Harper (US)
- Publication date: 1906
- Publication place: United Kingdom
- Media type: Print

The Call of the Blood is a 1906 dramatic romance novel by the British writer Robert Hichens.

== Adaptations ==
In 1920 it was turned into a French silent film The Call of the Blood directed by Louis Mercanton and starring Ivor Novello. A second adaptation Call of the Blood was released in 1948 and starred Kay Hammond and John Justin.

== Bibliography ==
- Goble, Alan. The Complete Index to Literary Sources in Film. Walter de Gruyter, 1999.
- Vinson, James. Twentieth-Century Romance and Gothic Writers. Macmillan, 1982.
