= Bamidbar =

Bamidbar (בַּמִּדְבָּר) is a Hebrew word, which is the fifth word of the Book of Numbers, the fourth book of the Torah (the first five books of the Tanakh, or Hebrew Bible). It means "In the wilderness", or "In the desert", ba midbar.

When used as a noun, Bamidbar might refer to:

- The Hebrew title of the biblical Book of Numbers
- Bemidbar (parsha), the 34th weekly parsha in the annual Jewish cycle of Torah readings
