= The Bracelet (novel) =

1930 novel

- First edition
- Author: Robert Hichens
- Language: English
- Genre: Drama
- Publisher: Cassell
- Publication date: 1930
- Publication place: United Kingdom
- Media type: Print

The Bracelet is a 1930 novel by the British writer Robert Hichens. A society scandal breaks over a bracelet given by a man to a woman, leading to a court case.

== Bibliography ==
- Vinson, James. Twentieth-Century Romance and Gothic Writers. Macmillan, 1982.
