= In the Wilderness (Hichens novel) =

1917 novel

- Author: Robert Hichens
- Language: English
- Genre: Drama
- Publisher: Methuen
- Publication date: 1917
- Publication place: United Kingdom
- Media type: Print

In the Wilderness is a 1917 novel by the British writer Robert Hichens.

== Bibliography ==
- Vinson, James. Twentieth-Century Romance and Gothic Writers. Macmillan, 1982.
