= After the Verdict (novel) =

1924 novel by Robert Hichens

- Author: Robert Hichens
- Language: English
- Genre: Drama
- Publisher: Methuen Publishing
- Publication date: 1924
- Publication place: United Kingdom
- Media type: Print

After the Verdict is a 1924 novel by the English writer Robert Hichens. It was published in London by Methuen and in New York by George H. Doran. The novel was listed as a mystery and a romance.

== Adaptation ==
In 1929 it was made into a silent film of the same title directed by Henrik Galeen and starring Olga Chekhova and Warwick Ward. The film is considered lost as of 2021.

== Bibliography ==
- Goble, Alan. The Complete Index to Literary Sources in Film. Walter de Gruyter, 1999.
- Vinson, James. Twentieth-Century Romance and Gothic Writers. Macmillan, 1982.
