= The Woman with the Fan (film) =

1921 film

- Directed by: René Plaissetty
- Written by: Leslie Howard Gordon
- Based on: The Woman with the Fan by Robert Hichens
- Starring: Mary Massart; Alec Fraser; Paulette del Baye
- Production company: Stoll Pictures
- Distributed by: Stoll Pictures
- Release date: July 1921
- Country: United Kingdom
- Languages: Silent; English intertitles

The Woman with the Fan is a 1921 British silent drama film directed by René Plaissetty and starring Mary Massart, Alec Fraser and Paulette del Baye. It is an adaptation of the 1904 novel of the same title by Robert Hichens.

== Cast ==
- Mary Massart as Lady Violet / Pimpernel Schley
- Alec Fraser as Lord Fitz Holmes
- Paulette del Baye as Mrs. Wolfstein
- Cyril Percival as Rupert Carey
- Harold Deacon as Robin Pearce
- George Calliga as Leo Ullford

== Bibliography ==
- Goble, Alan. The Complete Index to Literary Sources in Film. Walter de Gruyter, 1999.
