= The Woman with the Fan (novel) =

1904 novel

- Author: Robert Hichens
- Language: English
- Genre: Drama
- Publisher: Methuen
- Publication date: 1904
- Publication place: United Kingdom
- Media type: Print

The Woman with the Fan' is a 1904 novel by the British writer Robert Hichens.

== Adaptation ==
In 1921 it was adapted into a silent film The Woman with the Fan directed by René Plaissetty for Stoll Pictures.

== Bibliography ==
- Goble, Alan. The Complete Index to Literary Sources in Film. Walter de Gruyter, 1999.
- Vinson, James. Twentieth-Century Romance and Gothic Writers. Macmillan, 1982.
