= The Garden of Allah (1936 film) =

1936 film by Richard Boleslawski

- 1936 US Theatrical Poster
- Directed by: Richard Boleslawski
- Written by: William P. Lipscomb; Lynn Riggs; Willis Goldbeck (uncredited)
- Based on: The Garden of Allah; 1904 novel by Robert S. Hichens
- Produced by: David O. Selznick
- Starring: Marlene Dietrich; Charles Boyer; Basil Rathbone; C. Aubrey Smith; Joseph Schildkraut; John Carradine; Alan Marshal; Lucile Watson
- Cinematography: Virgil Miller; W. Howard Greene (uncredited); Harold Rosson (uncredited)
- Edited by: Hal C. Kern; Anson Stevenson (uncredited)
- Music by: Max Steiner
- Color process: Technicolor
- Production company: Selznick International Pictures
- Distributed by: United Artists
- Release date: November 19, 1936
- Running time: 79 minutes
- Country: United States
- Language: English
- Box office: $2.7 million (world)

The Garden of Allah is a 1936 American adventure drama romance film directed by Richard Boleslawski, produced by David O. Selznick, and starring Marlene Dietrich and Charles Boyer. The screenplay was written by William P. Lipscomb and Lynn Riggs, who based it on the 1904 novel of the same title by Robert S. Hichens. Hichens' novel had been filmed twice before, as silent films made in 1916 and 1927. The supporting cast of the sound version features Basil Rathbone, C. Aubrey Smith, Joseph Schildkraut, John Carradine, Alan Marshal, and Lucile Watson. The music score is by Max Steiner.

It was the third feature film to be photographed in Three-strip Technicolor, and (uncredited) cinematographers W. Howard Greene and Harold Rosson received a special Oscar for advances in color cinematography. The filming locations were in Buttercup, California and Yuma, Arizona. Filming started on April 15, 1936 and ended by July 3, 1936.

== Plot ==
After the death of her invalid father, wealthy Domini Enfilden returns to Le Couvent de Ste. Cecile, where she was reared, to seek counsel from Mother Josephine about her loneliness. The Mother Superior tells her that in the solitude of the Sahara Desert, she might find herself. Meanwhile, at a Trappist monastery at el Lagarnine in Tunis in Northern Africa, a visitor, Captain de Trevignac, tastes the liqueur for which the monastery is famous.

The liqueur is made from a secret formula by Brother Antoine, who has just fled the monastery, taking the secret with him. En route to the city of Beni Mora, Algeria, Domini meets Antoine on a train, but he is silent. Later, in a cafe, Antoine is entranced by an exotic dancer named Irena. When Irena pulls a knife on her lover, Hadj, who will not marry her, Antoine helps Domini flee, and introduces himself as Boris Androvsky.

The next day, they ride to the Oasis of the city Azur, where they meet Count Ferdinand Anteoni, who tells Domini to wait to venture into the desert until the urge is very strong. When native girls admire the crucifix around Boris' neck, he gives it to them by casting it in the water. Although Boris attracts Domini, he shocks her by his violent antipathy to religion.

Count Anteoni warns Domini, "a man who fears to acknowledge his God is unwise to set foot in the desert," while making reference to Boris, and tells them that the Arabs have a saying that "the desert is the garden of Allah". Later, a sand diviner tells Domini that something glorious is in store for her during her pilgrimage into the desert, but also gives her a grave warning.

As the weeks pass, Domini and Boris fall in love, and Boris still keeps his past a secret. While out riding, they come to a church, as the seer foretold. There, Father J. Roubier, who promised Mother Superior he would look out for Domini, notices Boris' fear and anger toward the church. Although the priest warns Domini not to make friends with Boris, after Boris threatens to leave, he and Domini swear their love, and the priest agrees to marry them the next day.

Following the wedding, Boris and Domini take a caravan into the desert with Domini's guide, Batouch, and Hadj. One night, Domini lights a torch to guide Boris back to the camp, and inadvertently saves a patrol that has been lost for three days. Among the men is de Trevignac. Boris returns and de Trevignac is sure they have met before. After Batouch serves a bottle of the Lagarnine liqueur, de Trevignac remembers who Boris is and leaves the table in anger.

Domini, confused, pleads with Boris to tell her the truth, but he refuses. At dawn, Domini asks de Trevignac to tell her what happened between him and Boris, but he merely crosses himself and walks away. De Trevignac and his men depart, but he tells Anteoni where the caravan is camped.

At dinner, Anteoni tells the story of the Lagarnine liqueur, which will never again be manufactured as the monk who knew the secret of the liqueur disappeared after taking his final vows. Domini is horrified by the story, but Boris asserts that the man had a right to love, then cries at the realization of what he has done.

After Anteoni leaves, Boris falls on his knees in the sand and tells Domini about his life at the monastery, where he had lived since childhood under the vow of silence, and spoke with people for the first time when, as an adult he was put in charge of the monastery's hotel. Believing that no one who loves will be punished by God, Domini agrees to let Boris return to the monastery and make reparations, promising that they will be together forever. At the gates of the monastery, Boris and Domini embrace for the last time.

== Cast ==
- Marlene Dietrich as Domini Enfilden
- Charles Boyer as Boris Androvski
- Basil Rathbone as Count Ferdinand Anteoni
- C. Aubrey Smith as Father J. Roubier
- Joseph Schildkraut as Batouch
- John Carradine as the "Sand Diviner"
- Alan Marshal as Captain de Trevignac
- Lucile Watson as Mother Superior Josephine
- Henry Brandon as Hadj
- Tilly Losch as Irena
- Irene Franklin as female American tourist

== Reception ==
Although the film was originally budgeted at $1.6 million, production costs exceeded an estimated $370,000, roughly the financial loss the film recorded.

Writing for The Spectator in 1936, Graham Greene gave the film a neutral review, saying it showed the Catholic church as "so superhumanly pious, so intensely dramatic" whereas he preferred the left-wing New Statesman magazine's view of the church as "shabby priests counting pesetas on their fingers in dingy cafés before blessing tanks". Greene praised the surrealism of the film as "really magnificent" and noted that the dialogue had a distinctly apocalyptic tone closely matched by Dietrich's delivery of her lines.

The film received Academy Award nominations for Best Score and Best Assistant Director, and W. Howard Greene and Harold Rosson received an Academy Honorary Award for the color cinematography.

Following the success of the movie in Brazilian cinemas, in Rio de Janeiro the park between the beach neighborhoods of Leblon and Ipanema, i.e. Jardim de Alah, was named after the movie.

The film is featured in the opening scene of the music video for Time After Time by Cyndi Lauper.
