= In the Wilderness: Coming of Age in Unknown Country =

1996 memoir by Kim Barnes

- Author: Kim Barnes
- Language: English
- Genre: Memoir
- Publisher: Doubleday
- Publication date: 1996
- Publication place: United States

In the Wilderness: Coming of Age in Unknown Country is a memoir by Kim Barnes, published by Doubleday in 1996.

The book was a finalist for the Pulitzer Prize for Autobiography/Biography in 1997. It received praise from Kirkus Reviews, and Maude Casey of Salon.
