= The Call of the Blood (1920 film) =

1920 film directed by Louis Mercanton

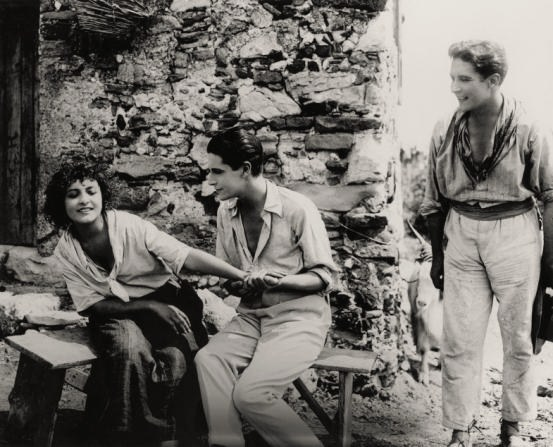
- Desdemona Mazza, Ivor Novello and Gabriel de Gravone
- Directed by: Louis Mercanton
- Written by: Louis Mercanton
- Based on: The Call of the Blood by Robert Hichens
- Starring: Ivor Novello; Phyllis Neilson-Terry; Charles Le Bargy
- Cinematography: Émile Pierre
- Production company: Société des Films Mercanton
- Distributed by: Royal Film
- Release date: 12 March 1920
- Country: France
- Languages: Silent; French intertitles

The Call of the Blood (French: L'appel du sang) is a 1920 French silent drama film directed by Louis Mercanton and starring Ivor Novello, Phyllis Neilson-Terry, and Charles Le Bargy. The film is most notable for giving a screen debut to the Welsh actor Novello, who went on to become a major star in the 1920s. It is based on the 1906 novel of the same title by Robert Hichens. The costumes were designed by Paul Poiret.

== Synopsis ==
An Englishman commits adultery with a Sicilian woman.

== Cast ==
- Phyllis Neilson-Terry as Hermione Lester
- Ivor Novello as Maurice Delarey
- Desdemona Mazza as Maddalena
- Charles Le Bargy as Émile d'Arbois
- Gabriel de Gravone as Gaspare
- Salvatore Lo Turco as Salvatore

== Preservation ==
A copy of The Call of the Blood missing one reel is held by Library and Archives Canada.

== See also ==
- Call of the Blood (1948)

== Bibliography ==
- Macnab, Geoffrey. Searching for Stars. Cassell, 2000.
