= Robert Hichens (writer) =

British writer (1864–1950)

- Born: 14 November 1864; Speldhurst, Kent, England
- Died: 20 July 1950 (aged 85); Zürich, Switzerland
- Education: Clifton College; Royal College of Music
- Occupations: Writer, journalist, music critic

Robert Smythe Hichens (14 November 1864 – 20 July 1950) was an English journalist, novelist, music lyricist, short story writer, music critic and collaborated on successful plays. He is best remembered as a satirist of the "Naughty Nineties".

== Biography ==
Hichens was born in Speldhurst in Kent, the eldest son of the Rev. Frederick Harrison Hichens, and his wife Abigail Elizabeth Smythe. He was educated at Clifton College, the Royal College of Music and early on had a desire to be a musician. Later in life he would become music critic on The World, taking the place of George Bernard Shaw. He studied at the London School of Journalism. Hichens was a great traveller. Egypt was one of his favourite destinations – he first went there in the early 1890s for his health. For most of his later life he lived outside England, in Switzerland and the Riviera. Hichens was a homosexual; he never married.

Hichens first novel, The Coastguard's Secret (1886), was written when he was only seventeen. He first became well known among the reading public with The Green Carnation (1894), a satire of Hichens's friends Oscar Wilde and Lord Alfred Douglas; since the work made clear Wilde was homosexual it was withdrawn from publication in 1895, but not before helping set the stage for Wilde's public disgrace and downfall.

Hichens was also friends with several other writers, including E. F. Benson and Reggie Turner, as well as the composer Maude Valérie White.

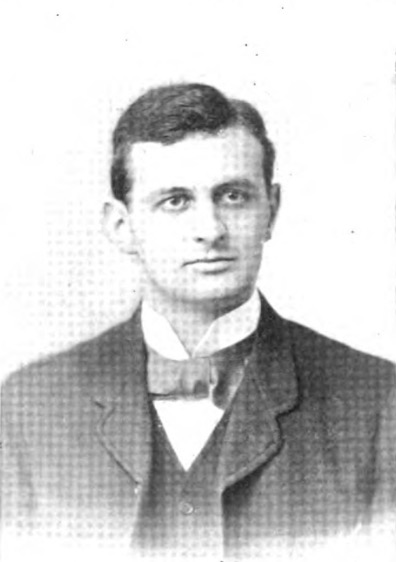
Hichens in August–September 1895 edition of The Bookman

Hichens's first big success was An Imaginative Man (1895); set in the city of Cairo, Egypt, a place which fascinated Hichens, it is a study of insanity, in which the hero becomes dangerously obsessed with the Great Sphinx. Other early fiction includes The Folly of Eustace (1896), a collection of stories including some supernatural; Flames (1897), a story resembling Dr Jekyll and Mr Hyde; The Londoners (1898), a satire about decadent London; The Slave (1899), a fantasy about an amazing emerald; Tongues of Conscience (1900), a collection of five horror stories including "How Love Came to Professor Guildea" (this story is about a supernatural visitation and is thought by some to be Hichens's best fiction – it is frequently anthologised). "How Love Came to Professor Guildea" was not initially well-received, with Frederic Taber Cooper calling the story "a hideous bit of morbidity" and Edmund Wilson dismissing the story as "trash". Later reviews of the story were more positive; J. A. Cuddon called it "outstanding" and compared it with "The Horla" by Guy de Maupassant and "The Beckoning Fair One" by Oliver Onions. Brian Stableford described the story as an "authentic masterpiece of horror fiction", and Jason Colavito called it "possibly one of the greatest stories of its age".

Hichens's Felix (1902), is an early fictional treatment of hypodermic morphine addiction, while The Garden of Allah (1904) sold well internationally, and was made into a film three times.

Hichens published his memoirs in 1947, Yesterday.

== Selected bibliography ==
Novels

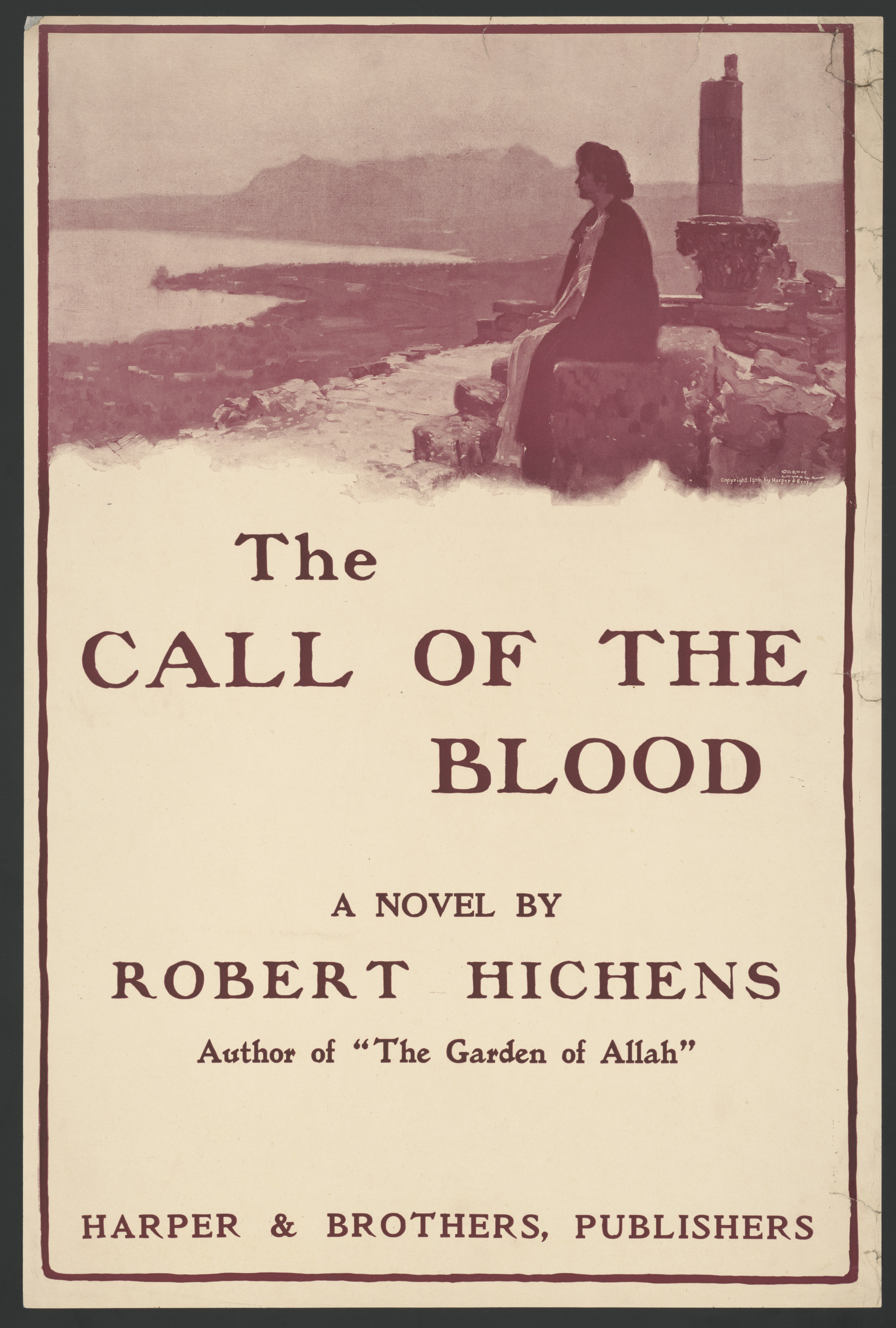
First edition cover of The Call of the Blood (1906)

- The Coast Guard's Secret (1886)
- The Green Carnation (published anonymously, 1894; republished, 1949) – available at Wikisource
- An Imaginative Man (1895)
- The Collaborators (1896)
- Flames (1897)
- The Londoners (1898)
- The Slave (1899)
- The Prophet of Berkeley Square (1901)
- Felix (1902)
- The Garden of Allah (1904), elaborately presented as a play in New York City and filmed thrice, in 1916, 1927 (with Alice Terry) and 1936 (one of the earliest three-strip Technicolor features, with Marlene Dietrich and Charles Boyer)
- The Woman with the Fan (1904)
- The Call of the Blood (1906)
- Barbary Sheep (1907)
- A Spirit in Prison (1908)
- Bella Donna (1909), in which Alla Nazimova starred on Broadway in 1912, filmed in 1915, in 1923 with Pola Negri and in 1934 with Mary Ellis and Conrad Veidt.
- The Fruitful Vine (1911)
- The Dweller on the Threshold (1911)
- The Way of Ambition (1913)
- In the Wilderness (1917)
- Snake-Bite (1919)
- Mrs. Marden (1919)
- Spirit of the Time (1921)
- December Love (1922)
- The Last Time (1924)
- After the Verdict (1924)
- The Bracelet (1930)
- The First Lady Brendon (1931)
- Mortimer Brice (1932)
- The Paradine Case (1933) – film version directed by Alfred Hitchcock in 1947
- The Power To Kill (1934)
- The Pyramid (1936)
- The Sixth of October (1936)
- Daniel Airlie (1937)
- Secret Information (1938)
- The Journey Up (1938)
- That Which Is Hidden (1939)
- The Million (1940)
- A New Way of Life (1942)
- Veils (1943)
- Harps in the Wind (1945)
- Beneath the Magic (1950)

Collections

- The Folly of Eustace: And Other Stories (1896)
- Bye-Ways (1897)
- Tongues of Conscience (1898, 1900)
- The Black Spaniel: And Other Stories (1905)
- Snake-Bite: And Other Stories (1919)
- The Afterglow and Other Stories (1935)
- The Return of the Soul and Other Stories (2001; ed. S. T. Joshi)

Nonfiction

- The Spell of Egypt (1910)
- Yesterday (1947)

Anthologies containing stories by Hichens

- Great Short Stories of Detection, Mystery and Horror 1st Series (1928)
- Alfred Hitchcock Presents (1957)
- The 2nd Fontana Book of Great Ghost Stories (1966)
- Medley Macabre (1966)
- Black Water (1984)
- I Shudder at Your Touch (1992)
- 4 Classic Ghostly Tales (1993)

Short stories

- "How Love Came to Professor Guildea" (1900)
- "Demetriadi's Dream"

=== Plays ===
- The Law of the Sands (1916)
- Black Magic (1917)
- The Voice from the Minaret (1919)

== Filmography ==
- Bella Donna, directed by Edwin S. Porter and Hugh Ford (1915, based on the novel Bella Donna)
- The Garden of Allah, directed by Colin Campbell (1916, based on the novel The Garden of Allah)
- Barbary Sheep, directed by Maurice Tourneur (1917, based on the novel Barbary Sheep)
- Flames, directed by Maurice Elvey (UK, 1917, based on the novel Flames)
- The Slave, directed by Arrigo Bocchi (UK, 1918, based on the novel The Slave)
- Hidden Lives, directed by Maurits Binger and B. E. Doxat-Pratt (Netherlands, 1920, based on a play by Robert Hichens and John Knittel)
- The Call of the Blood, directed by Louis Mercanton (France, 1920, based on the novel The Call of the Blood)
- The Woman with the Fan, directed by René Plaissetty (UK, 1921, based on the novel The Woman with the Fan)
- The Fruitful Vine, directed by Maurice Elvey (UK, 1921, based on the novel The Fruitful Vine)
- The Voice from the Minaret, directed by Frank Lloyd (1923, based on the play The Voice from the Minaret)
- Bella Donna, directed by George Fitzmaurice (1923, based on the novel Bella Donna)
- The Lady Who Lied, directed by Edwin Carewe (1925, based on the story The Lady Who Lied)
- The Garden of Allah, directed by Rex Ingram (1927, based on the novel The Garden of Allah)
- After the Verdict, directed by Henrik Galeen (UK, 1929, based on the novel After the Verdict)
- Bella Donna, directed by Robert Milton (UK, 1934, based on the novel Bella Donna)
- The Garden of Allah, directed by Richard Boleslawski (1936, based on the novel The Garden of Allah)
- Temptation, directed by Irving Pichel (1946, based on the novel Bella Donna)
- The Paradine Case, directed by Alfred Hitchcock (1947, based on the novel The Paradine Case)
- Call of the Blood, directed by John Clements and Ladislao Vajda (UK, 1948, based on the novel Call of the Blood)
