= After the Verdict (film) =

1929 film by Henrik Galeen

- Directed by: Henrik Galeen
- Written by: Alma Reville
- Based on: After the Verdict by Robert Hichens
- Produced by: I. W. Schlesinger
- Starring: Olga Chekhova; Warwick Ward; Betty Carter; Malcolm Tod
- Cinematography: Theodor Sparkuhl
- Production company: Tschechowa Film
- Distributed by: British Independent Film Distributors; Bavaria Film
- Release date: January 1929
- Running time: 9,370 feet
- Countries: Germany; United Kingdom
- Language: English

After the Verdict (German: Die Siegerin) is a 1929 British-German drama film directed by Henrik Galeen and starring Olga Chekhova and Warwick Ward. In the film, an aristocrat is accused of murdering his lover. It was based on the 1924 novel of the same title by Robert Hichens. It was made as an independent film at British International Pictures' Elstree Studios. Once considered a lost film, a print including its DeForest Phonofilm music-and-effects soundtrack is in the collections of the George Eastman Museum. It was Galeen's penultimate film as a director, after returning to Germany he directed the thriller The House of Dora Green (1933).

== Cast ==
- Olga Chekhova as Vivian Denys
- Warwick Ward as Oliver Baratrie
- Betty Carter as Mrs. Sabine
- Malcolm Tod as Jim Gordon
- Ivo Dawson as Vivian's father
- Daisy Campbell as Vivian's mother
- Winter Hall as Lord Dartry
- Annie Esmond as Lady Cardridge
- A.B. Imeson as Coroner
- Henry Victor as Mr. Sabine

== Bibliography ==
- Low, Rachael (1971). The History of the British Film, 1918–1929. London: Allen & Unwin. ISBN 978-0-04-791021-0.
