= The World (journal) =

Former weekly paper

The World was a British weekly paper, published in London from 1874 to 1920. It was founded by Edmund Hodgson Yates (1831–1894) and E. C. Grenville Murray (1824–1881) and became one of the leading society papers with investigative reports, gossip and an intimate style of journalism. Among its staff and contributors were William Archer, Wilkie Collins and Bernard Shaw.

== History ==
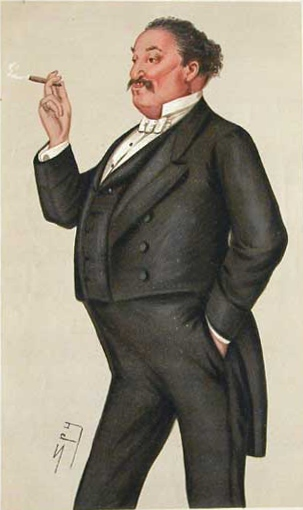
Yates caricatured by "Spy" in Vanity Fair, 1878

Edmund Yates, a novelist, playwright and journalist, returned in March 1873 from a lecture tour in the US from which he had made a substantial sum of money. The following year, while in Paris, he entered into a business partnership with the journalist Grenville Murray, who was effectively in exile from Britain. They founded a new weekly, The World: A Journal for Men and Women, with Yates, based in London, as editor. The first issue was published on 8 July 1874, and the paper flourished. After six months Yates was able to buy out his colleague's share of the partnership; Murray made a profit of almost 1000 per cent on his investment.

In the words of P. D. Edwards in a study of Yates's career, The World's appeal was:

to men and women of the world: clubmen, sportsmen, hangers-on of the literary, theatrical, and artistic worlds, fashionable and would-be fashionable ladies. After a few months it became a conspicuous and continuing success, generating hosts of imitators and inaugurating, it is generally agreed, the most distinctive twentieth-century style of journalism.

Earlier in his journalistic career Yates had specialised in writing gossip columns, and in the new paper he contributed one titled "What the World Says", under the pen name "Atlas". Among the other regular features were a page on art and another on music. The first writer of the art page was William Archer, who was succeeded in 1886 by Bernard Shaw. In 1890 Shaw succeeded Louis Engel (known as "the best hated musical critic in Europe") as The World's music critic; he held the post until 1894.

Yates also printed satirical verse, and a regular feature headed "Feuilleton" which contained instalments of new fiction such as Wilkie Collins's The Fallen Leaves. Among those contributing to the paper's correspondence column were James Whistler and Oscar Wilde.

The paper survived a damaging criminal libel prosecution in 1883, which, after the trial and an appeal, resulted in a short prison sentence for Yates (16 January to 10 March 1885). After his sudden death in 1894 two of his sons ran the paper. Yates's widow died in 1900, and in 1905 a controlling interest in The World was bought by Alfred Harmsworth for £14,000. He hoped to turn it into a competitor for the weekly Country Life, but it met with indifferent success, and ceased publication in 1920.

== Sources ==
- Holroyd, Michael (1997). Bernard Shaw: The One-Volume Definitive Edition. London: Chatto & Windus. ISBN 978-0-7011-6279-5.
