= The Garden of Allah (novel) =

1904 novel by Robert Hichens

- Later US edition
- Author: Robert Hichens
- Language: English
- Genre: Romance
- Publisher: Methuen (UK); Frederick A. Stokes (US)
- Publication date: Oct 1904 (UK); Jan 1905 (US)
- Publication place: United Kingdom
- Media type: Print
- Pages: 482

The Garden of Allah is a 1904 romantic drama novel by the British writer Robert Hichens. The novel was published by Methuen and Company on 13 October 1904 in London, and on 28 January 1905 by Frederick A. Stokes in New York. It is largely set in French Algeria, with a brief opening in Marseille, and a conclusion in French Tunis.

== Plot summary ==
Domini Enfilden is a wealthy Englishwoman who travels to French Algeria, accompanied only by her maid. A devout Catholic, Domini is seeking peace after many years enduring the apostasy of her late father, Lord Rens. Converted to Catholicism by Lady Rens, he renounced the faith when she deserted him. On a train travelling south to the oasis town of Beni-Mora, (Note: A fictional name for what has been identified as Biskra. Many other places in the novel are simililarily disguised.) she encounters a rude fellow, who is taciturn and self-absorbed. At the southern terminus of Beni-Mora, she hires an Arab guide, Batouch, who is handsome and something of a poet. She sees the odd European from the train deliberately avoid the Catholic priest of the local church. Batouch informs her that the fellow is also English, and furthermore speaks both French and a little Arabic.

Domini, on her own, visits the little church in Beni-Mora, where she meets Father Roubier, the priest. Later, Batouch takes her to visit the garden of Count Anteoni; they pass a grand hotel, closed for the season, with a tower on top. Smaïn, the garden's gatekeeper, allows her into the walled villa and garden, where she delights in the peaceful atmosphere. She encounters Count Anteoni, who explains he also owns the grand hotel. The Count and Domini discuss the attraction of the desert, which he tells her some Arabs call "the Garden of Allah". He gives permission for her to visit the tower of the grand hotel, which she does the next day. While admiring the grand vista of the desert from the tower, she stumbles into the odd traveller. He speaks with her for the first time, using French. When she speaks of the promise of inner peace in the desert, he expresses surprise; he sees only turmoil.

That evening Batouch takes Domini to the Cafe Tahar, where the Ouled Naïl dancers are to be found. Batouch's cousin Hadj latches onto them, seeking to divert them to the cafe of the story-tellers, as he fears the dancer Irena. Batouch bribes Tahar to fetch Irena from another cafe. Meanwhile Domini notices the strange traveller is also at the cafe, watching the dancers. When Irena comes to dance she recognizes Hadj and tries to stab him. The cafe erupts into a panic; the stranger saves Domini. He offers to escort her back to their hotel. At the Hotel du Désert, when pressed, he admits to knowing English. He finally tells Domini his name is Boris Androvsky.

Domini has Batouch bring her a horse to ride, one with spirit. She wishes to ride alone in the desert, but Boris won't allow it. He has never ridden a horse before, and is thrown the first time he mounts. But he climbs back on and rides with her to the small nearby oasis of Sidi-Zerzour, where an immense guide named Mustapha takes them in hand. Domini is impressed with the pilgrims devotions at the Mosque of Zerzour, but Boris remains outside. Back at Beni-Mora, Boris secretly practices riding each morning before daylight, which pleases Domini who has observed him unaware. They take to riding through the desert countryside around the oasis, but Boris never opens up to her about himself.

Domini takes Boris to meet Count Anteoni, only to find he has invited Father Rubier to lunch. Boris is plainly ill-at-ease with the priest. The Count tells Domini he will be leaving for the desert town of Beni-Haseen, implying he may not return. He encourages her to treat the garden as her own while he is gone. He also persuades to allow the Sand Deviner to read her destiny. The Deviner foretells her leaving Beni-Mora for the south, travelling in a palanquin during a ferocious storm. Domini refuses to hear more, but the Count listens to the rest and seems troubled. After he has departed Beni-Mora, Domini wanders alone in the Count's garden, where Boris finds her. Falling to his knees he confesses his love for her. His passion and the effort it cost him to open up impress Domini.

Ten days have passed; Domini and Boris are married in the little church, despite Father Roubier's grave misgivings about the groom. Batouch has organized a large expedition of camels, horses, grooms, and attendants, with supplies and tents for the newlyweds journey south on the road to Toumbuctu. A great storm is blowing but the couple ride in a palanquin on the back of a camel. The storm tapers off, and the couple travel through the larger Garden of Allah, visiting distant towns and oases. At Ben-Haseen, Domini encounters the Count, who reveals he has converted to Islam and will not return to Beni-Mora. He is obviously troubled by her marriage, but makes no effort to interfere.

While visiting the French garrison town of Mogor, a disturbing incident occurs with Captain De Trevignac, who initially welcomes the couple. Something passes between him and Boris that eludes Domini's understanding. They move on to Amara, another desert town, where Boris becomes morose and avoids Domini. She is visited by Father Max Beret, who enlivens her with his cheerful ways. But upon Ouardi bringing out a bottle of liquor, the good father recognizes it as a brand produced only at the Trappist monastery of El-Largani near Tunis. He tells Domini that the monks will produce no more of it, for the only one of them who knew the secret of its making ran away a year ago, after twenty years of devotion.

Domini at last confronts Boris about his reticence, imploring him to reveal his sorrows. He yields and confesses he is the runaway Trappist monk, and that De Trevignac had recognized him at Mogor. He tells her the story of his upbringing and his turning away from the world to become a monk. He explains that one day he heard a voice tempting him with a life of wealth and careless ease, so he fled El-Largani. His brother in Tunis gave him clothes and a large sum of money, so he could travel. He has committed no crime, and no one is pursuing him, yet he cannot find peace in the world. Domini realizes that at heart he is still a monk, and will never be happy in their marriage. She decides not to tell him that she is pregnant.

Because of her faith, Domini will no longer allow him to touch her. Instead, they hurry back to Beni-Mora, where she dismisses all her attendants. She and Boris take the train north to Tunis, where she delivers him up to the monastery gate at El-Largani then departs in a coach. She has compelled him to express his love for her by fulfilling his lifelong vows. They part forever, he to a monk's cell and a life of repentance and hard labor, she to the garden Count Anteoni has sold to her. The book concludes with a view of her six years later, sitting in the garden with her young son Boris.

== Characters ==
Major

- Domini Enfilden - The central figure of the novel, she is tall, strong, and masculine in temperament and interests. Her thoughts and inner feelings predominate throughout the book. An expert rider, fencer, and marksman, she is now thirty-two and wealthy. Her name is no accident... she not only dominates all the characters who come in contact with her, but she also is devoted to her faith. She has the natural confidence of one who has never had to work for a living.
- Boris Androvsky - Son of an English mother and Russian father, who had settled in North Africa for his health. When his father died, Boris entered a Trappist Monastery at age seventeen. Tall and immensely strong from years of hard labor, he is socially awkward and naïve to the ways of the outside world. Years of enforced silence have left him ill-equipped to express his feelings. His brother inherited the Tunisian vineyards left by their father.
- Count Anteoni - Half-Italian, half-Maltese nobleman, owner of the garden and the empty grand hotel in Beni-Mora. Past middle-age, he is fascinated with the desert and its people. His friendship for Domini is constant and platonic.
- Father Roubier - Parish priest of the little church in Beni-Mora, the only character other than Domini whose thoughts are made explicit to the reader. He likes and admires Domini, but has an instinctive dislike for Boris Androvsky, as though he can sense his spiritual failing. His little white dog Bous-Bous adores Boris.
- Batouch - Tall, broad-shouldered, Arabic youth who acts as Domini's guide and general factotum throughout the book. Affecting a poetic languor, he loses his cool only under provocation by his cousin Hadj.
- Captain De Trevignac - French officer, attached to the garrison at Mogar, who recognizes Boris Androvsky, precipitating the novel's climax.

Minor

- Suzanne Charpot - Domini's French maid of three years service. Roughly the same age as her mistress, she is seldom heard and seen after the first days in Beni-Mora.
- Hadj-ben-Ibrahim - Arabic guide, cousin to Batouch, small and handsome, prone to aggressive client-recruiting, he is fearful of Irena, with good cause.
- The Sand Diviner - Wild, disheveled inhabitant of Beni-More with a scarred face, who importunes Domini to let him read her future in the bag of sand he carries around his neck. She is wary of him, but lets Count Anteoni persuade her to accept a reading.
- Smaïn - Gatekeeper to Count Antoeni's garden, always to be found clutching a few flowers whose scent absorbs most of his attention.
- Irena - Tall, thin, intense Kabyle dancer in the Cafe Tahar, who has sworn to kill Hadj because he would not love her.
- Larbi - Gardner to Count Anteoni, seldom seen but often heard playing a love song on his flute.
- Mustapha - Giant guide in the smaller oasis of Sidi-Zerzour who shows Domini and Boris to the mosque that harbors the remains of an Islamic hero.
- Ali - Youthful helper to Batouch on the desert journeys.
- Ouardi - Another of the many Arabic servants Domini acquires on her desert journey.
- Father Max Beret - Aumônier of Amara, who has gone a bit "native". Cheerful and good-tempered, it is he who tells Domini about the runaway Trappist.

== Reception ==
Critical reception was enthusiastic, with one reviewer expressing admiration for the author's originality with a subject matter far from his previous books. W. L. Alden of The New York Times said that Hichens had "handled a good plot in a very skillful and satisfactory way." However, a later assessment from the same paper's "Saturday Review of Books and Art" lamented the book's "obvious faults of prolixity and a labored minuteness in some of the descriptive passages". The New York Tribune also offered a nuanced appreciation: "Mr. Hichens may not have made a lasting addition to literature, but he has written... a book which we cannot but admire while under its spell."

The novel was well-received by readers of the time. In the UK, it went through five editions in the first two months. Sales in the US took just three months before the fifth edition was published.

Hichens was said to be disturbed over implications in the American press that he had made a trip to Algeria just to work up this novel. Through his US publisher, Frederick A. Stokes, he released a statement clarifying the novel came about from his many visits to the region of Algeria he described, and from several stays at a Trappist monastery in North Africa.

== Themes ==
Reviewer George Murray identified two major themes running throughout the work: "the desert which is 'The Garden of Allah', and the Roman Catholic faith". The unknown reviewer for The Minneapolis Journal thought "the conflict of the spiritual with the carnal" was the principal theme. The anonymous reviewer for The Evening Standard however, thought faith alone the dominant subject of the novel: "Running through the book is a strong religious motive, on which, indeed, the whole plot is built up. Faith is a necessity; to sin against faith is the unpardonable offense, and to Mr. Hichens it matters little whether the faith be Christian or Mohammedan, so long as it be real and binding".

== Adaptations ==
=== Stage ===
Impresario David Belasco secured the dramatic rights to the novel in February 1905. However, nothing appears to have been done on the stage until Liebler & Company obtained the rights and George C. Tyler produced it, using an adaption by the author and Mary Anderson. The Garden of Allah opened on Broadway on 21 October 1911. It ran for seven months, then went on tour for another nine months. The play used many people actually from North Africa, as well as horses, camels, and other animals. It's set decorations were amazingly complex for the time, as were such special effects as mounting a sand storm on stage.

=== Music ===
Gustav Holst composed a suite of music, premiered in 1912, titled Beni Mora after the fictional oasis town in Hitchens' novel.

=== Film ===
It has been turned into American-made films on three occasions:

- The Garden of Allah (1916 film), directed by Colin Campbell
- The Garden of Allah (1927 film), directed by Rex Ingram
- The Garden of Allah (1936 film), directed by Richard Boleslawski
