= The Garden of Allah (1916 film) =

1916 film by Colin Campbell

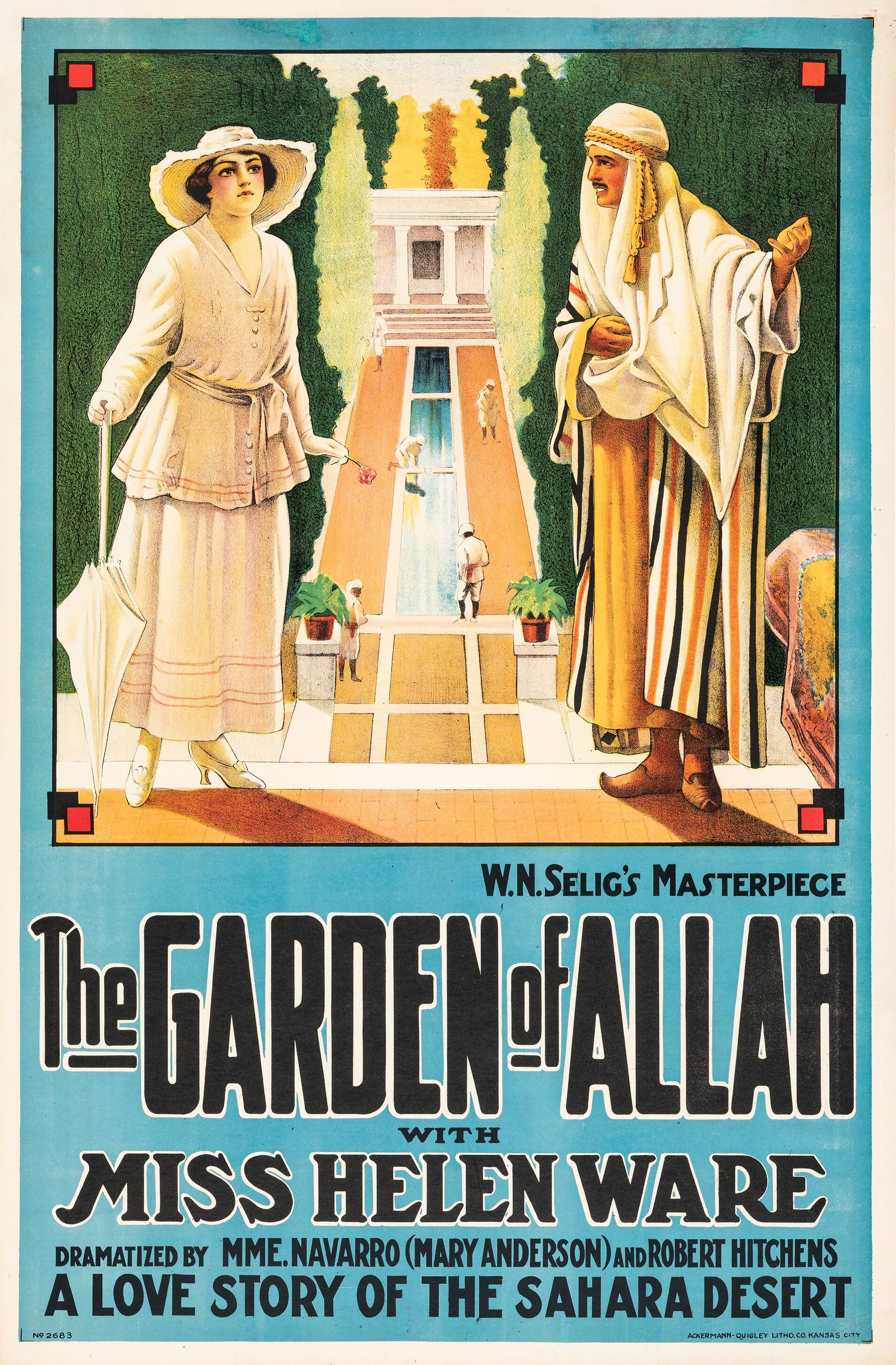
- Poster for the film
- Directed by: Colin Campbell
- Written by: Gilson Willets
- Based on: The Garden of Allah by Robert Hichens
- Produced by: William Nicholas Selig
- Starring: Helen Ware; Tom Santschi; Eugenie Besserer
- Production company: Selig Polyscope Company
- Distributed by: V-L-S-E
- Release date: December 25, 1916
- Running time: 100 minutes
- Country: United States
- Languages: Silent; English intertitles

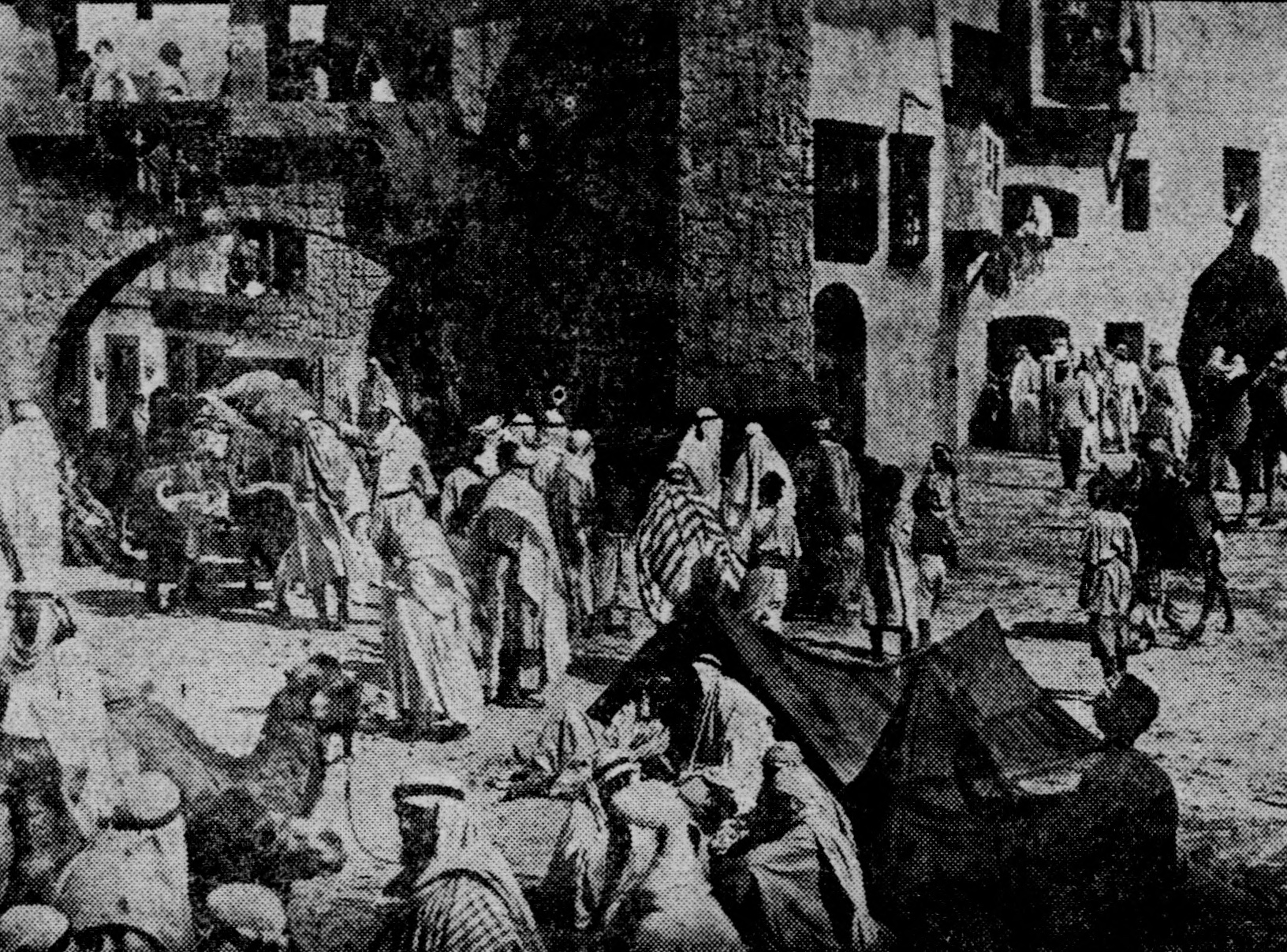
Scene from the film.

The Garden of Allah is a 1916 American silent drama film directed by Colin Campbell and starring Helen Ware, Tom Santschi and Eugenie Besserer. It is based on the 1904 novel of the same title by Robert Smythe Hichens, adapted a number of times including a 1937 sound film starring Marlene Dietrich. Location shooting took place in the Mojave Desert.

== Cast ==
- Helen Ware as Domini Enfilden
- Tom Santschi as Boris Androvsky
- Will Machin as Capt. De Trevignac
- Matt Snyder as Count Anteoni (*aka Matt B. Snyder)
- Harry Lonsdale as Father Roubier
- Eugenie Besserer as Lady Rens
- James Bradbury Sr. as The Sand Diviner
- Al W. Filson as Lord Rens
- Cecil Holland as Hadj
- Frank Clark as Father Beret
- Billy Jacobs as Child
- Pietro Sosso as Batouch
- Camille Astor as Suzanna

== Preservation ==
A print of the film survives in the George Eastman Museum.

== Bibliography ==
- Matthew Bernstein & Gaylyn Studlar. Visions of the East: Orientalism in Film. Rutgers University Press, 1997.
