= The Rocks of Valpre =

The Rocks of Valpre may refer to:

- The Rocks of Valpré (novel), a 1914 novel by Ethel M. Dell
- The Rocks of Valpre (1919 film)
- The Rocks of Valpre (1935 film)
