= Yellow Claw =

Yellow Claw may refer to:

- Yellow Claw (character), Marvel Comics supervillain
- Yellow Claw (DJs), Dutch DJ and record production duo from Amsterdam
- The Yellow Claw, a 1915 Sax Rohmer novel
- The Yellow Claw (film), 1921 film adaptation of the Sax Rohmer novel
- Conall Yellowclaw, a Scottish fairy tale
