= The Haven (novel) =

1909 novel by Eden Phillpotts

- Title page for The Haven (1909)
- Author: Eden Phillpotts
- Language: English
- Genre: Drama
- Publisher: John Murray
- Publication date: 1909
- Media type: Print

The Haven is a 1909 novel by the British writer Eden Phillpotts. Whereas the author's previous breakthrough novel Lying Prophets had been set in Cornwall, The Haven is set in the fishing community of Brixham in Devon.

== Adaptation ==
In 1921 it was adapted into the British silent film The Night Hawk starring Henri de Vries and Sydney Seaward.

== Bibliography ==
- Goble, Alan. The Complete Index to Literary Sources in Film. Walter de Gruyter, 1999.
- Hinton, Percival. Eden Phillpotts: A Bibliography of First Editions. Greville Worthington, 1931.
- Meadowcroft, Charles William. The Place of Eden Phillpotts in English Peasant Drama. University of Pennsylvania, 1924.
