= The Broken Road =

The Broken Road may refer to:

- The Broken Road (novel), a 1907 novel by the British writer A. E. W. Mason
- The Broken Road (film), a 1921 British film adaptation
- The Broken Road (travel book), a travel book by Patrick Leigh Fermor
- The Broken Road, a 1999 album by Jeff White
- Broken Road Productions, a production company established by film producer Todd Garner in 2005
- "Broken Road", a song by Kanye West from the album Donda 2

== See also ==
- "Bless the Broken Road", an American country song
