= Keeper of the Door =

- Directed by: Maurice Elvey
- Screenplay by: Byron Webber
- Based on: The Keeper of the Door by Ethel M. Dell
- Starring: Basil Gill; Peggy Carlisle; Hamilton Stewart; Marjorie Hume; George Harrington; Ivo Dawson
- Production company: Stoll Pictures
- Distributed by: Stoll Pictures
- Release date: March 1919
- Country: United Kingdom
- Language: Silent

Keeper of the Door is a 1919 British silent drama film directed by Maurice Elvey and starring Basil Gill, Peggy Carlisle and Hamilton Stewart. It was an adaptation of a 1915 novel by Ethel M. Dell.

== Cast ==
- Basil Gill as Max Wyndham
- Peggy Carlisle as Olga Ratcliffe
- Hamilton Stewart as Nick Ratcliffe
- Marjorie Hume as Violet Campion
- George Harrington as Dr. Ratcliffe
- Ivo Dawson as J. Hunt Goring
