= The Hundredth Chance =

The Hundredth Chance may refer to:

- The Hundredth Chance (novel), a 1917 novel by Ethel M. Dell
- The Hundredth Chance (film), a 1920 British silent film based on the novel
