= Knave of Diamonds =

(The) Knave of Diamonds may refer to:

- Knave of Diamonds (arts association), a circle of avant-garde artists in Russia
- The Knave of Diamonds (novel), a 1913 novel by Ethel M. Dell
- The Knave of Diamonds (film), a 1921 British silent film based on the novel
- Knave of Diamonds, a 2024 novel by Laurie R. King

== See also ==
- Jack of diamonds (disambiguation)
- Jack (playing card)
