= Jimmy Woo =

Fictional Marvel character

- Textless cover of Agents of Atlas #1 (October 2006); Art by Tomm Coker

Publication information
- Publisher: Marvel Comics
- First appearance: Yellow Claw #1 (October 1956)
- Created by: Al Feldstein; Joe Maneely

In-story information
- Alter ego: Woo Yen Jet
- Species: Human
- Team affiliations: S.H.I.E.L.D. Agents of Atlas; G-Men; Protectors; Three Xs

James "Jimmy" Woo (Woo Yen Jet) is a fictional secret agent appearing in American comic books published by Marvel Comics. Created by EC Comics writer Al Feldstein and artist Joe Maneely, the Chinese American character first appeared in Yellow Claw #1 (October 1956) from Atlas Comics, the 1950s predecessor of Marvel. Woo has since appeared occasionally in a variety of Marvel publications.

The character has made minor appearances in animated media and video games. Additionally, he appears in the Marvel Cinematic Universe film Ant-Man and the Wasp (2018), the Disney+ series WandaVision (2021), and a small cameo in Ant-Man and the Wasp: Quantumania (2023) portrayed by Randall Park.

== Publication history ==
Jimmy Woo was the hero of the espionage series Yellow Claw, named for his antagonist, a "yellow peril" Communist mandarin. While the short-lived series named after that villain ran only four issues (October 1956 – April 1957), it featured art by Maneely, Jack Kirby, and John Severin.

Kirby took over as writer-artist with issue #2—inking his own pencil art there and in the following issue, representing two of the very rare occasions on which he did so. On the final issue, the inking was done by Western- and war-comics veteran Severin. Also, other artists drew the covers: Severin on #2 and #4, Bill Everett on #3.

Well regarded for its relatively mature storyline with a rare Asian fictional hero for the period and in particular for Maneely's exquisitely atmospheric art, the book nevertheless failed to find an audience. Woo and other characters from the series were brought into the Marvel universe a decade later, beginning with the "S.H.I.E.L.D." story in Strange Tales #160 (Sept. 1967). Woo joins that espionage agency in Nick Fury, Agent of S.H.I.E.L.D. #2 (July 1968).

Woo went on to be featured in the 1977–1979 Marvel series Godzilla and the 2006–07 Marvel series Agents of Atlas. Before the cancellation of the 1990s alternate universe Marvel imprint Razorline, as produced but unpublished titles of its various series were preparing to blend the Razorline into primary Marvel continuity, Woo as well as Nick Fury and other S.H.I.E.L.D. agents guest-starred in Wraitheart #5. Woo starred as the leader of a team of S.H.I.E.L.D. operatives code-named Agents of Atlas, in the 2006–2007 series of that name.

== Fictional character biography ==
Jimmy Woo, from Strange Tales #166 (March 1968). Art by Jim Steranko & Joe Sinnott.

James Woo is an Asian-American FBI agent assigned primarily to investigate and apprehend the Chinese-national mandarin known as the Yellow Claw, a Fu Manchu manqué (author Sax Rohmer had a Fu Manchu novel titled The Yellow Claw). Complicating matters, the Claw's grandniece, Suwan, was in love with Woo in the 1950s series.

In retcon stories, Woo is an FBI agent assigned in 1958 to oversee the 1950s superhero team the Avengers, a short-lived predecessor of the later, more established team of that name.

As a S.H.I.E.L.D. agent, Woo joins the "Godzilla Squad" to hunt Godzilla. This unit, led by Dum Dum Dugan, employed such weapons as a giant robot called Red Ronin (for which Woo was shortlisted as a pilot candidate), and was headquartered in a smaller version of the S.H.I.E.L.D. Helicarrier, known as the Behemoth.

Woo was temporarily replaced by a Life Model Decoy (a form of artificial human utilized by S.H.I.E.L.D.) of the self-aware, renegade "Deltan" class, and went through five such bodies before dying with other repentant LMDs. Woo reemerged from stasis, along with other high-ranking officers that had been taken and replaced.

In 2006–2007 stories, Woo attempted a secret raid of a group identified as The Atlas Foundation. Going AWOL and taking several other willing agents with him, he infiltrated an Atlas Foundation location, resulting in all the recruits being killed. Woo was critically burned and lost higher brain function. The former 1950s Avenger Gorilla-Man, by now also a S.H.I.E.L.D. agent, gave the organization a classified record of the 1950s team, of which S.H.I.E.L.D. had no prior knowledge. Gorilla-Man rescues Woo with the aid of fellow 1950s teammates M-11 and Marvel Boy, who restores Woo to his 1958 self.

With his teammates he follows the Atlas Foundation around the world, restoring Namora to life, and eventually confronting the Yellow Claw, who reveals that the whole ordeal was only a test. As Woo passed it, the Yellow Claw commits suicide, ending his long life and placing Woo as head of the Atlas Foundation. Woo later surfaces in New York, where he and Spider-Man shut down a rebellious cell of the Atlas Foundation. Later, Woo becomes head of the Pan-Asian School for the Unusually Gifted, a Mumbai, India-based school for Asian teenagers with superhuman abilities. Sanjar Javeed is a teacher there.

Woo appears alongside the Asian-American superheroes Amadeus Cho, Ms. Marvel, Shang-Chi, and Silk and SHIELD agent Jake Oh at a charity event attacked by an alien army. Dubbing their group the Protectors, Woo rallies the heroes and bystanders to overthrow their captors. In The War of the Realms, Woo recruits most of the Protectors and several other Asian and Pacific superheroes into the Atlas Foundation as the New Agents of Atlas. Afterward, Woo resumes his duties as the head of the Atlas Foundation and makes Cho the leader of the New Agents. He also teams with Blue Marvel and Night Thrasher to form a new iteration of the Three Xs. In Atlantis Attacks, Woo introduces the original and new Agents of Atlas to each other.

== Reception ==
Jeff Yang, curator of the "Marvels & Monsters: Unmasking Asian Images in U.S. Comics, 1942–1986" exhibit at the Japanese American National Museum, called Jimmy Woo a "positive exception" to the "largely negative" depiction of Asians and Asian-Americans in comics at time when "the view of Asians was shaped by racist, xenophobic wartime propaganda."

== Other versions ==
=== Ultimate Marvel ===
In the Ultimate Marvel universe, Jimmy Woo is an agent of S.H.I.E.L.D., partnered with Sharon Carter. He was introduced in Ultimate Spider-Man #16, in which he and Carter are trying to capture Doctor Octopus.

== In other media ==
=== Television ===
Jimmy Woo appears in The Avengers: Earth's Mightiest Heroes, voiced by Nolan North.

=== Marvel Cinematic Universe ===
Jimmy Woo appears in media set in the Marvel Cinematic Universe, portrayed by Randall Park. This version is James E. Woo, an FBI agent from Bakersfield, California. Introduced in the live-action film Ant-Man and the Wasp (2018), Woo makes subsequent appearances in the live-action miniseries WandaVision (2021) and the live-action film Ant-Man and the Wasp: Quantumania (2023). An alternate universe variant of the character appears in the animated television series Marvel Zombies (2025).

=== Video games ===
- Jimmy Woo appears in Marvel Heroes, voiced by James Sie.
- Jimmy Woo appears in Marvel's Avengers, voiced by Aleks Le.
- Jimmy Woo appears in Lego Marvel Super Heroes 2 via the "Agents of Atlas" DLC.

== See also ==
- List of S.H.I.E.L.D. members
