= Greatheart (Dell novel) =

1918 novel

- 4th edition, published by T. Fisher Unwin in 1919
- Author: Ethel M. Dell
- Language: English
- Genre: Romance
- Publisher: Unwin; Putnam (US)
- Publication date: 1918
- Publication place: United Kingdom
- Media type: Print

Greatheart is a romance novel by the British writer Ethel M. Dell which was first published in 1912. It was one of four of Dell's novels to make the Publishers Weekly list of top ten bestselling books during the 1910s in America.

== Adaptation ==
In 1921 the novel was adapted into a silent film Greatheart directed by George Ridgwell and starring Cecil Humphreys and Madge Stuart.

== Bibliography ==
- Barnett, Vincent L. & Weedon, Alexis. Elinor Glyn as Novelist, Moviemaker, Glamour Icon and Businesswoman. Routledge, 2016.
- Vinson, James. Twentieth-Century Romance and Gothic Writers. Macmillan, 1982.
