= A Gamble in Lives =

1920 film

- Directed by: George Ridgwell
- Written by: Frank Stayton (play); George Ridgwell
- Produced by: Edward Godal
- Starring: Malvina Longfellow; Norman McKinnel; Alec Fraser
- Production company: British & Colonial Kinematograph Company
- Distributed by: Pathé Pictures International
- Release date: November 1920
- Country: United Kingdom
- Languages: Silent; English intertitles

A Gamble in Lives is a 1920 British silent drama film directed by George Ridgwell and starring Malvina Longfellow, Norman McKinnel and Alec Fraser. It is based on the play The Joan Danvers by Frank Stayton.

== Plot ==
An insurance agent demands a shipowner's daughter in return for silence regarding scuttling plans.

== Cast ==
- Malvina Longfellow as Joan Danvers
- Norman McKinnel as James Danvers
- Alec Fraser as Captain Ross
- John Reid as Jimmie Danvers
- Molly Adair as Gladys Danvers
- Frances Ivor as Mrs. Danvers
- Bobby Andrews as Harry Riggs
- Alec Wynn-Thomas as Sims

== Bibliography ==
- Low, Rachael. History of the British Film, 1918-1929. George Allen & Unwin, 1971. ISBN 978-0-04-791021-0.
