= William Saville =

William Saville may refer to:

- William Saville (actor), in The Rocks of Valpre (1919 film)
- William Saville (MP) for Reading (UK Parliament constituency)

== See also ==
- William Savile (disambiguation)
- William Saville-Kent
