= Lily of Killarney =

Lily of Killarney may refer to:

- The Lily of Killarney, an 1862 opera by the Anglo-German composer Julius Benedict
- Lily of Killarney (1929 film), a British film directed by George Ridgwell
- Lily of Killarney (1934 film), a British film directed by Maurice Elvey
