= The Rocks of Valpre (1935 film) =

1935 film by Henry Edwards

- Original British trade ad
- Directed by: Henry Edwards
- Written by: H. Fowler Mear
- Based on: the novel The Rocks of Valpré by Ethel M. Dell
- Produced by: Julius Hagen
- Starring: John Garrick; Winifred Shotter; Leslie Perrins
- Cinematography: Sydney Blythe
- Edited by: Michael C. Chorlton
- Music by: W.L. Trytel
- Production company: Real Art Productions
- Distributed by: RKO Radio Pictures (UK)
- Release dates: 8 July 1935 (UK); 26 January 1937 (US)
- Running time: 73 minutes
- Country: United Kingdom
- Language: English

The Rocks of Valpre (U.S. title: High Treason) is a 1935 British crime film directed by Henry Edwards and starring John Garrick, Winifred Shotter and Leslie Perrins. It was written by H. Fowler Mear based on the 1913 novel of the same name by Ethel M. Dell, and made as a quota quickie at Twickenham Studios.

== Plot summary ==
During the mid-nineteenth century, in a quaint coastal village in France, a young English woman finds herself captivated by the charms of a French cavalry officer. Unfortunately, their passionate love story takes an abrupt turn when she is abruptly sent back to England to complete her education in a convent. Simultaneously, her paramour is unjustly accused of espionage by a rival officer, leading to his imprisonment on Devil's Island. As she resumes her life in England, she eventually enters into a comfortable and respectable marriage with a wealthy Englishman.

A decade later, her tranquility is disrupted when she faces the threat of blackmail. In a surprising twist of fate, her former lover manages to escape from Devil's Island to rush to her aid. However, the toll of his time in the penal colony has left him seriously ill, and tragically, he succumbs shortly after reuniting with his lost love.

== Cast ==
- John Garrick as Louis de Monteville
- Winifred Shotter as Christine Wyndham
- Leslie Perrins as Captain Rodolphe
- Michael Shepley as Trevor Mordaunt
- Lewis Shaw as Noel Wyndham
- Athene Seyler as Aunt Philippa
- Agnes Imlay as Madamoiselle Gautier

== Critical reception ==
Kine Weekly wrote: "Period, sentimental, romantic melodrama, mixed with music, spectacularly adapted from the novel by Ethel M. Dell. The story is a trifle dated in its drama and romantic appeal, but it is well acted and presented with colourful elaboration."

The Daily Film Renter wrote: "Narrative seems trifle naive and does not always convince, but reasonably good acting of John Garrick and Winifred Shotter in leads gives it interest. ... This subject enjoyed a considerable vogue when it was originally published, but it must be confessed that, judged by present-day standards, it seems a trifle out-moded. Nevertheless, it has a fair quota of good, robust action of a type that should appeal to the masses."

TV Guide called the film a "Sappy drama."

== See also ==
- The Rocks of Valpre (1919)
