= Uncle Dynamite =

1948 novel by P. G. Wodehouse

- First edition (UK)
- Author: P. G. Wodehouse
- Language: English
- Genre: Comic novel
- Publisher: Herbert Jenkins (UK); Didier & Co. (US)
- Publication date: 22 October 1948 (UK); 29 November 1948 (US)
- Publication place: United Kingdom
- Media type: Print

Uncle Dynamite is a novel by P. G. Wodehouse, first published in the United Kingdom on 22 October 1948 by Herbert Jenkins, London and in the United States on 29 November 1948 by Didier & Co., New York. It features the mischievous Uncle Fred, who had previously appeared in Uncle Fred in the Springtime (1939).

== Plot ==
Frederick Altamont Cornwallis Twistleton, fifth Earl of Ickenham, known to all as Uncle Fred, is on the loose once again (Lady Ickenham having decamped for a wedding in Trinidad), and Reginald ("Pongo") Twistleton, his long-suffering nephew, has every right to be petrified.

Uncle Fred has just arrived at Ashenden Manor, Ashenden Oakshott, Hampshire. Ashenden Manor is the home of Sir Aylmer Bostock, Pongo's future father-in-law. Pongo is already in residence and has committed two rank floaters: accidentally smashing a whatnot from Sir Aylmer's collection of African curios, and (in the course of demonstrating how he thinks Brazilian natives kill birds with rude slings) smashing a coveted bust of his host.

Pongo's solution is to replace the busted bust with another one, abstracted from Ickenham Hall. But unknown to him, the replacement bust was fashioned by his former fiancée Sally Painter, and conceals valuable jewellery that a friend of hers was planning to smuggle through New York Customs.

Sally tries to replace the bust with another of Sir Aylmer she sculpted (but had had returned to her, after an unfortunate incident relating to her brother Otis' publication of Sir Aylmer's memoirs), but this comes to naught, and both busts end up in Sir Aylmer's collection room.

Uncle Fred is unruffled by this setback and decides to infiltrate the house as an impostor. Having met Bill Oakshott (an unassuming young man who is the actual owner of Ashenden Manor, but who shrinks from confronting and displacing his bombastic, overbearing uncle Sir Aylmer) on the train, Uncle Fred contrives to get invited to the house—under the name of Major Brabazon-Plank. Unfortunately, the local Constable, Harold Potter, happens to have grown up with Major Plank (and also happens to remember arresting Uncle Fred and Pongo at the dog races under the names of Edwin Smith and George Robinson). Potter, intimately tied to the household through his fiancée, the housemaid Elsie Bean, becomes suspicious, and watches the house.

Uncle Fred's tasks are: to snatch the bust for Sally Painter; convince Pongo that Hermione Bostock is not the proper wife for him and that Sally is; restore Bill Oakshott to his place as head of his family home and unite him with Hermione, whom he has loved for years; and convince Constable Potter not only to not arrest him, but indeed to quit the force so he and Elsie Bean may live happily ever after. Complications arise, including the arrival of the real Major Brabazon-Plank— but his menace is neutralized because of his horror of judging the Bonnie Babies competition at the Ashenden Oakshott Fête, an honor for which Uncle Fred, as the ersatz Major, has volunteered.

Bill Oakshott finds inspiration in the dominant hero of Ethel M. Dell's The Way of an Eagle.

== Main characters ==
- Frederick Twistleton, Lord Ickenham — "Uncle Fred", Pongo's well-intentioned meddling uncle who aims to "spread sweetness and light"
- Reginald "Pongo" Twistleton — Lord Ickenham's nervous nephew and Drones Club member, engaged to Hermione
- William "Bill" Oakshott — Diffident owner of Ashenden Manor, Sir Aylmer's nephew, and Pongo's childhood friend who is in love with Hermione
- Sir Aylmer Bostock — Bill's overbearing uncle, a former colonial governor about to stand for Parliament
- Lady Emily Bostock — Polite wife of Sir Aylmer and mother of their daughter Hermione
- Hermione Bostock — Forceful novelist who writes under the name Gwynneth Gould and is engaged to Pongo
- Sally Painter — American sculptor and ex-fiancée of Pongo who still has feelings for him and regards Lord Ickenham as an uncle
- Otis Painter — Sally's brother, head of Meriday House, publisher of Sir Aylmer Bostock's memoirs
- Major Brabazon-Plank — Explorer who led a recent expedition to the Lower Amazon, which included Bill, and who went to school with Lord Ickenham and Sir Aylmer
- Elsie Bean — Gregarious housemaid at Ashenden Manor
- Harold Potter — Vigilant police constable engaged to Elsie

== Style ==
Wodehouse obtains a humorous effect by using patterns of word formation in varied ways, such as when the prefix "de-" is added to a proper name, which occurs when Pongo brings the house-maid Elsie Bean out of a cupboard in chapter 9: "His manner as he de-Beaned the cupboard was somewhat distrait." In chapter 8, a character separates "hobnob" into its constituent elements: "It all depended on what you meant by the expression [i.e. hobnob]. To offer a housemaid a cigarrette is not hobbing. Nor, when you light it for her, does that constitute nobbing." A non-standard modification to a word occurs in chapter 13, when the word glimp is used as a back-formation of the word "glimpse" by the policeman Harold Potter: "I just caught sight of her for a minute as she legged it away, like as it might have been a glimp."

Ambiguities in language can lead to comedic cross-talk, such as when confusion is caused by two different meanings of the word "by" in chapter 13:

"I was assaulted by the duck pond."
"By the duck pond?" Sir Aylmer asked, his eyes widening.
"Yes, sir."
"How the devil can you be assaulted by a duck pond?"
Constable Potter saw where the misunderstanding had arisen. The English language is full of these pitfalls.
"When I say 'by the duck pond,' I didn't mean 'by the duck pond,' I meant 'by the duck pond.' That is to say," proceeded Constable Potter, speaking just in time, "'near' or 'adjacent to', in fact 'on the edge of'."

Incongruity between descriptions of a particular situation is used for comedic effect, as in chapter 1: "From the penny-in-the-slot machine at the far end to the shed where the porter kept his brooms and buckets the platform was dark with what practically amounted to a sea of humanity. At least forty persons must have been present." Foreign loan words are fairly frequent in Wodehouse's stories, sometimes in incongruous contexts, such as "mésalliance" being used to describe a convict's sister marrying a policeman (chapter 3.5).

Formal language is frequently juxtaposed with colloquial expressions in Wodehouse's stories. This occurs in chapter 5: "There is an expression in common use which might have been invented to describe the enterprising peer in moments such as this: the expression 'boomps-a-daisy.' You could look askance at his methods, you could shake your head at him in disapproval and click your tongue in reproof, but you could not deny that he was boomps-a-daisy." Some of Wodehouse's older, more dignified male characters have humorously inappropriate, discourteous nicknames from their years at school, such as Sir Aylmer "Mugsy" Bostock, Major "Bimbo" Brabazon-Plank, and Frederick Altamont Cornwallis "Barmy" Twistleton, Lord Ickenham.

The stylistic device of the "enumeration" is used with a carefully planned anticlimax at the end in chapter 6: "Now slept the crimson petal and the white, and in the silent garden of Ashenden Manor nothing stirred save shy creatures of the night such as owls, mice, rats, gnats, bats and Constable Potter."

Vivid imagery involving exaggerated similes and metaphors is frequently used in Wodehouse's stories, for example in chapter 3: "A sticky moisture had begun to bedew his brow, as if he had entered the hot room of some Turkish bath of the soul." In chapter 2, an exaggerated synonym is used for comic effect when Lord Ickenham asks "What have you been doing, Bill Oakshott, to merit this reception—nay, this durbar?"

Wodehouse uses clichés out of place or in unusual ways for humorous effect. An example occurs in chapter 6: "Sometimes in our wanderings about the world we meet men of whom it is said that they have passed through the furnace. Of Sir Aylmer it would be more correct to say that he had passed through the frigidaire." Variations on Shakespearean quotations often appear in Wodehouse's stories, as in chapter 6 when Lord Ickenham greets Bill Oakshott with "Well met by moonlight, proud Oakshott."

== Publication history ==
The first UK edition dust jacket was illustrated by Frank Ford. The first US edition dust jacket was illustrated by Hal McIntosh, and illustrations by McIntosh were included throughout the book.

A condensed version of the story was published in one issue of Liberty in April 1949, with illustrations by Hal McIntosh. A condensed version was also published in one issue of the Toronto Star Weekly on 30 April 1949.

The story was included in the 1983 collection The World of Uncle Fred, published by Hutchinson, London.

== Adaptations ==
Uncle Dynamite was adapted for television as a 60-minute episode of the NBC anthology series The Philco Television Playhouse. The episode first aired on 29 January 1950, and starred Arthur Treacher.

The story was adapted for BBC Radio 4 in six parts in 1994. The events of "Uncle Fred Flits By" were adapted in the first part as an introduction to the novel. The cast included Richard Briers as Uncle Fred, Hugh Grant as Pongo, Paul Eddington as the narrator, Simon Treves as Bill Oakshott, Charles Gray as Sir Aylmer Bostock, Josephine Tewson as Lady Bostock, Chris Emmett as Harold Potter, Teresa Gallagher as Elsie Bean, Susie Brann as Sally, Mary Chater as Hermione Bostock, Toby Longworth as Otis, and Donald Hewlett as Major Brabazon-Plank.

== See also ==
- A list of stories featuring Uncle Fred and Pongo
