= God's Good Man =

1919 film by Maurice Elvey

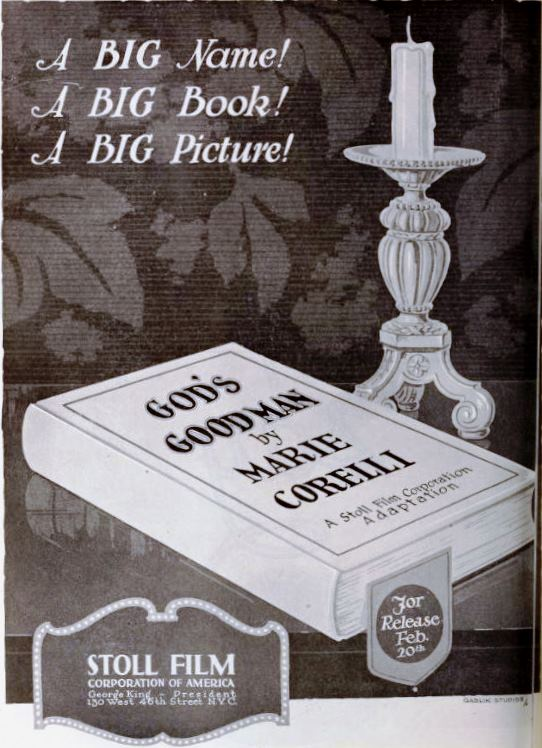
- American advertisement
- Directed by: Maurice Elvey
- Based on: God's Good Man by Marie Corelli
- Release date: 1919
- Country: United Kingdom
- Language: Silent

God's Good Man is a 1919 British silent drama film directed by Maurice Elvey and starring Basil Gill, Peggy Carlisle and Barry Bernard. It was based on a 1904 novel by Marie Corelli. Its plot involves an heiress who marries a much poorer man.

== Cast ==
- Basil Gill as Reverend John Walden
- Peggy Carlisle as Maryilla Vancourt
- Barry Bernard as Julien Adderley
- Hugh Dabernon-Stoke as Oliver Leach
- Teddy Arundell as Bainton
- Julian Henry as Lord Roxmouth
- Temple Bell as Cicely Bourne
- Kate Gurney as Mrs. Spice
