= A Debt of Honour (1922 film) =

1922 British film by Maurice Elvey

- Directed by: Maurice Elvey
- Written by: Ethel M. Dell (short story)
- Starring: Isobel Elsom; Clive Brook; Sydney Seaward
- Production company: Stoll Pictures
- Distributed by: Stoll Pictures
- Release date: 1922
- Running time: 50 minutes (5 reels)
- Country: United Kingdom
- Language: English

A Debt of Honour is a 1922 British silent drama film directed by Maurice Elvey and starring Isobel Elsom, Clive Brook and Sydney Seaward. It is based on a short story by Ethel M. Dell.

== Cast ==
- Isobel Elsom as Hope Carteret
- Clive Brook as Walter Hyde
- Sydney Seaward as Major Bearing
- Lionelle Howard as Ronald Cartaret
- Lewis Gilbert as Proprietor
- Frank Goldsmith as Colonel Latimer
- Frances Peyton as Mrs. Latimer
- Hilda Sims as Ayah

== Bibliography ==
- Low, Rachael. History of the British Film, 1918-1929. George Allen & Unwin, 1971.
