= The Sport of Kings (1921 film) =

1921 film

The Sport of Kings is a 1921 British silent sports film directed by Arthur Rooke and starring Victor McLaglen, Douglas Munro and Cyril Percival. The screenplay concerns a man who tries to prevent his wealthy ward from marrying a man involved in the horseracing world.

== Cast ==
- Victor McLaglen as Frank Rosedale
- Douglas Munro as James Winter
- Cyril Percival as Harry Lawson
- Phyllis Shannaw as Elaine Winter

== See also ==
- List of films about horses
- List of films about horse racing
