= William Savile =

William Savile may refer to:

- Sir William Savile, 3rd Baronet (1612–1644), MP for Yorkshire and Old Sarum
- William Savile, 2nd Marquess of Halifax (1665–1700), MP for Newark-on-Trent
- William Savile (MP for Lincolnshire), see Lincolnshire (UK Parliament constituency)

== See also ==
- William Saville (disambiguation)
