= The Broken Road (novel) =

1907 novel by A. E. W. Mason

- First edition
- Author: A. E. W. Mason
- Language: English
- Genre: Adventure and romance
- Publisher: Smith, Elder & Co
- Publication date: 1907
- Publication place: British India
- Media type: Print
- Pages: 352

The Broken Road is a 1907 novel of adventure and romance by A. E. W. Mason, set in India during the period of British rule. It first appeared in serial form in The Cornhill Magazine. As a result of the book's publication, the British Government abolished a regulation that had prevented soldiers of the British Indian Army, no matter how valorous, from being eligible to receive the Victoria Cross.

== Plot ==
During the period of British rule in India, the northern frontier region of Chiltistan had always been a potential flashpoint although the local tribes are kept in check by the Khan, a puppet ruler maintained in power by the British.

To enhance Chiltistan's defensibility, the Government decides to construct a road across the territory with support from the Khan who sees opportunities for increased trade and personal profit. Its construction is supervised by British army officer Harry Linforth. But the road increasingly infuriates the local people, and before it can be finished the workers and British troops are besieged and Harry Linforth is killed. Work ceases and it is unclear whether it will ever re-start.

When Harry Linforth's young son, Dick, is old enough he is sent to Eton where he meets the Khan's son, Prince Sher Ali, who has been sent over to England to be educated. The pair become firm friends, and during their schooldays and later at Oxford they imagine collaborating to continue the work of Dick's late father, extending the road right across Chiltistan and over the passes "to the foot of the Hindu Kush." Linforth joins the army and is sent to Chatham, where he waits interminably for an Indian posting that will take him to Chiltistan to start his intended life's work on the road. Meanwhile, Sher Ali becomes a favourite of London polite society.

On a climbing holiday, Linforth and Sher Ali are introduced to Violet Oliver, a young widow with a penchant for jewels. Linforth woos her but she is reluctant, aware of the comforts she would have to give up in Chiltistan. Unknown to Linforth, Sher Ali also hopes to marry Violet, and gives her a valuable string of pearls which she is unable to resist in spite of knowing that she could never marry him because of his race. Feeling under pressure to return the necklace, she deceives the prince by having a copy made and sending that to him, keeping the original.

The British Government becomes weary of the Khan's profligacy in Chiltistan, and decides to force him to step down in favour of his son, now fully English-Educated and Westernised. Sher Ali is summoned back to India where it is made clear to him that his role is to marry a local woman, settle down in Chiltistan, and to become a British figurehead who will keep the local tribes in order. Having been accepted in London society as an equal, and with ambitions to marry an Englishwoman, Sher Ali finds this impossible to submit to. Increasingly resentful, he finds a new role as leader of a group of local tribes who intend to expel the British entirely.

Linforth at last receives his desired posting to Chiltistan but not, as he expects, to continue the road. That would now be dangerously provocative and would risk an uprising. Instead, he is instructed to persuade Sher Ali to return to the British side. The Prince, however, is not to be turned, and he leads a rebellion that is put down by British troops. He escapes, and Linforth is sent in pursuit. Ultimately Sher Ali is arrested and is deported by the British authorities to Burma, where he ends up "drinking himself to death with the riff-raff of Rangoon." Once again the British need the road, and Linforth is finally able to start his long-delayed work.

On leave in London three years later, Linforth by chance sees Violet across a crowded restaurant. She is flaunting expensive jewellery, and is dining with a group of friends and her new husband, a docile but wealthy man.

== Literary significance and criticism ==
At the time of its publication The Broken Road was considered second in excellence only to The Four Feathers. But Mason's biographer Roger Lancelyn Green, writing in 1952, was unable to agree. While he considered the book's opening to be one of the most brilliant that Mason ever wrote, he felt that the social atmosphere of the time was hard to recapture and that the later parts of the story "fade away into forgetfulness".

Green noted that The Broken Road was the author's only novel with a purpose, namely to criticise the then-fashion for bringing Indian princes over to England to be privately educated, introducing them to polite English society, and then sending them back to India where they suddenly found themselves treated by the British Government there as the inferior race. The book drew attention to the existence of a regulation that prevented soldiers of the British Indian Army, no matter how valorous, from being eligible to receive the Victoria Cross. Mason was told by A. J. Balfour that neither he nor the king had been aware of that fact until they read the novel. The regulation was changed as a result.

== Adaptation ==
The novel became the basis for a 1921 British silent drama film of the same name, directed by René Plaissetty.

== Bibliography ==
- Green, Roger Lancelyn (1952). A. E. W. Mason. London: Max Parrish.
