= Greatheart (film) =

1921 film

- Directed by: George Ridgwell
- Written by: Sidney Broome
- Based on: Greatheart by Ethel M. Dell
- Starring: Cecil Humphreys; Madge Stuart; Olive Sloane
- Production company: Stoll Pictures
- Distributed by: Stoll Pictures
- Release date: June 1921
- Country: United Kingdom
- Languages: Silent; English intertitles

Greatheart is a 1921 British silent drama film directed by George Ridgwell and starring Cecil Humphreys, Madge Stuart and Olive Sloane. It was based on the 1918 novel Greatheart by Ethel M. Dell. It was made by Stoll Pictures.

== Cast ==
- Cecil Humphreys as Eustace Studley
- Madge Stuart as Diana Bathurst
- Ernest Benham as Sir Scott Studley
- Olive Sloane as Rose de Vigne
- William Farris as Guy Bathurst
- Norma Whalley as Isobel Evrard
- Winifred Evans as Lady Grace de Vigne
- Paulette del Baye as Mrs. Bathurst
- Teddy Arundell as Colonel de Vigne
