= Lewis Gilbert (actor) =

British actor (1862–1925)

Lewis Gilbert (born Adolphe Louis Dardart; 1862 – 15 March 1925) was a French-born British actor and director of the silent era.

Gilbert was born in 1862 in France. He debuted on a music hall stage with his parents, who had a song-and-dance act. His final film as an actor was The Divorce of Lady X (1938).

He was married to Lina Naseby. He died in 1925 in Camberwell, London, England.

== Selected filmography ==
- She Stoops to Conquer (1914)
- The Manxman (1917)
- The March Hare (1919)
- The Mystery Road (1921)
- Gwyneth of the Welsh Hills (1921)
- The Oath (1921)
- Dick Turpin's Ride to York (1922)
- The Hound of the Baskervilles (1922)
- The Truants (1922)
- The House of Peril (1922)
- A Debt of Honour (1922)
- The Missioner (1922)
- The Wandering Jew (1923)
- Bonnie Prince Charlie (1923)
- Lamp in the Desert (1923)
- Chappy - That's All (1924)
- The Love Story of Aliette Brunton (1924)
- Money Isn't Everything (1925)
- Confessions (1925)
