= The Woman of His Dream =

1921 film

- Directed by: Harold M. Shaw
- Based on: a short story by Ethel M. Dell
- Starring: Mary Dibley; Alec Fraser; Sydney Seaward
- Release date: 1921
- Country: United Kingdom

The Woman of His Dream is a 1921 British silent drama film directed by Harold M. Shaw and starring Mary Dibley, Alec Fraser and Sydney Seaward. It was adapted from a short story by Ethel M. Dell.

== Cast ==
- Mary Dibley - Naomi
- Alec Fraser - Reginald Carey
- Sydney Seaward - Jeffrey Coningby
- Fred Thatcher - Charles Rivers
- Teddy Arundell - Adm Rivers
- Winifred Harris - Lady Emberdale
- Betty Howe - Gwen Emberdale
- John East - Fisherman
