= The Hundredth Chance (film) =

1920 film

- Directed by: Maurice Elvey
- Written by: Sinclair Hill
- Based on: The Hundredth Chance by Ethel M. Dell
- Starring: Dennis Neilson-Terry; Mary Glynne; Eille Norwood
- Production company: Stoll Pictures
- Distributed by: Stoll Pictures
- Release date: June 1920
- Running time: 5,255 feet
- Country: United Kingdom
- Languages: Silent; English intertitles

The Hundredth Chance is a 1920 British silent romantic drama film directed by Maurice Elvey and starring Dennis Neilson-Terry, Mary Glynne, and Eille Norwood. It was based on the 1917 novel The Hundredth Chance by Ethel M. Dell. It is not known whether the film currently survives, which suggests that it is a lost film.

== Plot ==
As summarized in a film publication, Jack Bolton (Seaward) is the genius of the racing stable of Lord Saltash. He falls in love with Maud Brian (Glynne), daughter of Lady Bernard Brian (Lascelles), who is married to the innkeeper Giles Sheppard (Arundell). While Maud knows Jack is in love with her, she is half in love with Lord Saltash (Neilson-Terry) and does not love Jack. However, Lord Saltash's cruelty to her crippled brother Bunny (Key) makes her hesitate. She contemplates marrying Jack to protect her brother. Jack then takes the "hundredth chance" and asks Maud to marry him, hoping her love will come later. After Maud marries Jack, Lord Saltash desires his trainer's new wife and traps her in his castle and tries to compromise her. That same day Saltash's horse named The Hundredth Chance wins a big race and Jack wins a fortune. That day Jack also wins his wife's love after his trust in her despite the apparently damning circumstances created by Lord Saltash. Maud, who had been wife in name only, becomes Jim's wife in fact.

== Cast ==
- Dennis Neilson-Terry as Lord Saltash
- Mary Glynne as Lady Maud Brian
- Eille Norwood as Dr. Jonathon Capper
- Sydney Seaward as Jack Bolton
- Teddy Arundell as Giles Sheppard
- Patrick Key as Bunny Brian
- Carmita Lascelles as Mrs. Sheppard
