= The Night Hawk (1921 film) =

1921 silent film

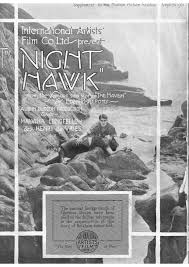
- Directed by: John Gliddon
- Written by: Gerard Fort Buckle
- Based on: The Haven by Eden Phillpotts
- Produced by: Alan Butler; Martin Sabine
- Starring: Henri De Vries; Malvina Longfellow; Sydney Seaward
- Production company: International Artists
- Distributed by: Anchor Films
- Release date: September 1921
- Running time: 50 minutes
- Country: United Kingdom
- Languages: Silent; English intertitles

The Night Hawk is a 1921 British silent drama film directed by John Gliddon and starring Henri de Vries, Malvina Longfellow and Sydney Seaward. It is based on the 1909 novel The Haven by Eden Phillpotts.

== Cast ==
- Henri de Vries as John Major
- Malvina Longfellow as Lydia Major
- Sydney Seaward as Sam Brokenshire
- Nadja Ostrovska as Deborah Honeywill
- Mary Brough as Aunt Emma
- Roy Byford as Mr. Mundy
- Francis Innys as Ned Major
- Caleb Porter as William Gilberd
- Edward Sorley as Tumbledown Dick

== Bibliography ==
- Low, Rachael. The History of the British Film 1918-1929. George Allen & Unwin, 1971.
