= Houp La! (film) =

1928 film

- Directed by: Frank Miller
- Written by: Hugh E. Wright (play); Fred Thompson (play); Arthur Phillips
- Starring: George Bellamy; Frank Stanmore; Peggy Carlisle; James Knight
- Production company: British Screen Productions
- Distributed by: British Screen Productions
- Release date: June 1928
- Running time: 6,722 feet
- Country: United Kingdom
- Languages: Silent; English intertitles

Houp La! (or Houp-La!) is a 1928 British silent comedy film directed by Frank Miller and starring George Bellamy, Frank Stanmore and Peggy Carlisle. It was loosely based on the 1916 stage musical Houp La! by Hugh E. Wright and Fred Thompson. The film was made at Isleworth Studios in London.

== Cast ==
- George Bellamy as Noah Swinley
- Frank Stanmore as Clown
- Peggy Carlisle as Spangles
- James Knight as Daniel
- Charles Garry as Proprietor

== Bibliography ==
- Low, Rachel. The History of British Film: Volume IV, 1918–1929. Routledge, 1997.
