= The Lure (1933 film) =

- Frame from the film
- Directed by: Arthur Maude
- Written by: J. Sabben-Clare (play)
- Produced by: Arthur Maude
- Starring: Anne Grey; Cyril Raymond; Alec Fraser
- Cinematography: Eric Cross
- Production company: Arthur Maude Productions
- Distributed by: Paramount British Pictures
- Release date: August 1933
- Running time: 65 minutes
- Country: United Kingdom
- Language: English

The Lure is a 1933 British crime film directed by Arthur Maude and starring Anne Grey, Cyril Raymond and Alec Fraser. It was written by J. Sabben-Clare based on his play. It was made at Wembley Studios as a quota quickie.

== Preservation status ==
The British Film Institute National Archive holds a collection of ephemera and stills but no film or video materials.

== Plot ==
At a house party, one of the guests secretly plans to retrieve a valuable blue diamond stolen from his brother by the host many years ago. Meanwhile, a pair of light-hearted guests plot to steal the gem purely as a prank, unaware that the butler has his own criminal designs on it as well. The pranksters pull off their robbery, but the fun turns to panic the next morning when the host is found dead. Things look bleak for the thieves as suspicion falls on the wrong man. However, the wrongly accused guest manages to outsmart the butler, tricking him into a confession and ensuring a happy ending.

== Cast ==
- Anne Grey as Julia Waring
- Cyril Raymond as Paul Dane
- Alec Fraser as John Baxter
- William Hartnell as Billy
- Philip Clarke as Peter Waring
- P.G. Clark as Merritt
- Doris Long as Dorothy
- Jean Ormond

== Reception ==
Kine Weekly wrote: "The weaving of the plot is rather clumsily carried out, and the time wasted in stressing the comedy allows the andience to identify the murderer with ridiculous ease. It is the inability of the director and players to circumvent the obvious that reduces the picture to the level of very ordinary quota screen entertainment."

The Daily Film Renter wrote: "Stagy, stilted, and uninspired melodrama ... Most of footage taken up by pseudo-witty conversations and redundant back-chat. Film lacks any pretensions to movement, being a potted play, with boring sequences, which drag out interminably. Indifferent photography, crude cutting, and amateurish acting by at least four members of cast. Climax foreseen early on. For easily pleased patrons only."

Picturegoer wrote: "Conventional mystery drama, told in a commonplace and colourless manner, with little grip or conviction. Acting is unremarkable, except for an amusing drunk act by Billy Hartnell."
