= Yellow Claw (character) =

Marvel Comics fictional character

The Yellow Claw
- Yellow Claw #1, cover art by Joe Maneely

Publication information
- Publisher: Marvel Comics
- First appearance: Yellow Claw #1 (October 1956)
- Created by: Al Feldstein (writer); Joe Maneely (artist)

In-story information
- Alter ego: Plan Chu
- Notable aliases: The Golden Claw (his preferred transliteration from the Chinese characters of his title to English); Bhagwan Sri Ananda
- Abilities: Telepathy; Genius-level intellect Long lifespan

The Yellow Claw is a supervillain appearing in American comic books published by Marvel Comics. Created by writer Al Feldstein and artist Joe Maneely, the character first appeared in Yellow Claw #1 (cover-dated October 1956), published by Atlas Comics, the 1950s predecessor of Marvel.

== Publication history ==
The Yellow Claw series chronicled the adventures of a Chinese-American FBI agent, Jimmy Woo, and his battles against a "Yellow Peril" Communist mandarin known only as the Yellow Claw. The title character was a Fu Manchu manqué (indeed, Fu Manchu author Sax Rohmer had written a novel titled The Yellow Claw) whose grandniece, Suwan, was in love with Woo.

While the short-lived espionage series named for him ran for only four issues (October 1956 – April 1957), it featured work by such notables as writer Al Feldstein and artist Joe Maneely (who created the character), Jack Kirby, and John Severin, and introduced characters later integrated into Marvel Comics continuity. Kirby took over as writer-artist with issue #2 – his own pencil art there and in the following issue representing two of the very rare occasions on which he did so. Unusually for a Kirby series, other artists drew the covers: Severin on #2 and 4, and Bill Everett on #3.

The series' influence was felt during the 1960s Silver Age of Comic Books, as writer-artist Jim Steranko brought the Yellow Claw into Marvel Comics continuity, beginning with the "Nick Fury, Agent of S.H.I.E.L.D." feature in Strange Tales #160 (September 1967), which introduced a robot version of the character. Woo was reintroduced that same issue, eventually joining the espionage agency S.H.I.E.L.D. in Nick Fury, Agent of S.H.I.E.L.D. #2 (July 1968). The actual Yellow Claw resurfaced later, in Captain America #164 (August 1973).

== Fictional character biography ==
The Yellow Claw was born over 150 years ago in mainland China. He is both a genius in biochemistry and a brilliant scientist and inventor in many fields, in addition to being an expert in mysticism, alchemy, and the martial arts. The Yellow Claw has formulated elixirs that have prolonged his life span, enabling him to retain his physical vitality. Following his Nick Fury appearances, artists have depicted him with an unusual jaundiced-looking, yellowish skin tone, possibly as a side effect of his life extension elixirs.

The Yellow Claw has dedicated himself to achieving world domination and supplanting Western civilization. He controls a worldwide criminal organization, along with a staff of research scientists and engineers. In 1942, the Yellow Claw encountered Lady Lotus in New York's Chinatown. In the 1950s, aided by his second-in-command, the Nazi war criminal Karl von Horstbaden, alias Fritz Voltzmann, the Claw forged a pact with Communist Chinese leaders including General Sung, whereby the Claw would seek to conquer the West for China. In fact, this was a ruse and he intended to conquer the world for himself. However, the Claw was continually foiled by FBI agent Jimmy Woo and betrayed by his sole living relative, his grandniece Suwan, whom he could not bring himself to kill.

Eventually, the Yellow Claw left the United States, placing the meddlesome Suwan in suspended animation. Decades later, after severing all of his ties with the People's Republic of China, the Claw fused Suwan's spirit with that of the conquest-minded ancient Egyptian Princess Fan-le-tamen. After the Claw was later betrayed by the vengeful Suwan, he transferred the spirit of Fan-le-tamen to himself, which caused Suwan to crumble into dust, and he escaped. The Yellow Claw then took part in the Black Lama's War of the Super-Villains, apparently killing his major rival for world conquest the Mandarin and battling the superhero Iron Man. He then attempted to destroy New York City using a tidal wave, but his effort was thwarted by Nick Fury and the teenage superhero Nova. A later plan to father sons by various genetically superior women, then sterilize mankind and rule the world, was foiled by the superhero team the Avengers. The Yellow Claw again attempted unsuccessfully to destroy New York City. He later named the second Madame Hydra as his new heir.

=== Robot Yellow Claw ===
Sometime after the 1950s events, an entity believed to be the Yellow Claw sent troops to invade Liberty Island and activate a powerful device there, but Nick Fury and Captain America foiled his plans. However, this was a robot impostor created by Doctor Doom as part of an elaborate, potentially world-destroying game between Doom and another of his robotic creations, the Prime Mover. The "Suwan" and "Fritz Voltzmann" accompanying this Yellow Claw were also robot impostors.

In a later Strange Tales story, it is unclear if this Yellow Claw is a robot.

=== Agents of Atlas and death ===
The Yellow Claw appears as a character in the 2006–2007 Marvel six-issue miniseries Agents of Atlas. He claimed that the title "the Yellow Claw" is actually a mistranslation of the Chinese characters and that his title is actually "the Golden Claw". He revealed his real name to be Plan Chu, Khan of a secret Mongol dynasty, who had chosen Jimmy Woo to be his heir. All his schemes to "conquer the world" had the secondary purpose of giving Woo an Asian menace to fight against and establish his credentials as an American hero. However, the plan did not succeed, as Woo was simply promoted to a bureaucratic desk job. Dispirited, the Claw established the Atlas Foundation. After revealing the truth to Woo – who accepted the role of Khan in order to turn the Atlas Foundation and the secret Mongol dynasty into a force for good – Plan Chu, like all the previous Khans, allowed himself to be eaten by Mr. Lao, a powerful immortal dragon, ensuring that there could not be two Khans.

== Powers and abilities ==
Through manipulation of the forces of magic, the Yellow Claw is able to create certain effects, including reanimating the dead. He also has the ability to psychically influence the sensory perceptions of others, enabling him to cast extremely realistic illusions. As a result of ingesting chemical elixirs, he has extended his life span; the Yellow Claw's extended life-span is dependent on the continued efficacy of his life-prolonging elixirs.

The Yellow Claw is a genius with extensive knowledge in various sciences, particularly biochemistry and genetics. He is proficient in robotics and has considerable knowledge of black magical lore. He is a master of Chinese martial arts and is an expert hand-to-hand combatant.

The Yellow Claw wears body armor and has access to various weapons as needed. He has access to specialized technology, including an id paralyzer that creates slaves subject to his telepathic control and a mind-amplification helmet that harnesses the psychic energies of his mind-slaves as a destructive force. He also has access to gigantic and hideously mutated creatures of his own design, created by biologists in his employ.

== Other versions ==
In an alternate universe in the late 1950s, the Yellow Claw recruited a team of superhuman minions and abducted President Dwight D. Eisenhower. He battled and was defeated by the 1950s "Avengers" team.

== Yellow Claw reprints ==
Some of the stories from the Yellow Claw series have been reprinted in other publications.

- Yellow Claw #1
  - "The Coming of the Yellow Claw" – Reprinted in Giant-Size Master of Kung Fu #1 (September 1974)
  - "The Yellow Claw Strikes", "Trap for Jimmy Woo" – Reprinted in Giant-Size Master of Kung Fu #2 (December 1974)
- Yellow Claw #2
  - "The Trap" – Reprinted in Marvel Premiere #1 (May 1972; character of Phil Kane revised as Nick Fury) and Giant-Size Master of Kung Fu #3 (March 1975)
  - "Concentrate on Chaos" – Reprinted in Giant-Size Master of Kung Fu #3 (March 1975)
  - "The Mystery of Cabin 361", "Temujai the Golden Goliath" – Reprinted in Giant-Size Master of Kung Fu #4 (June 1975)
- Yellow Claw #3
  - "The Microscopic Army" – Reprinted in The Golden Age of Marvel Comics (1997, ISBN 0-7851-0564-6)
  - "UFO, the Lighting Man" – Reprinted in Marvel Visionaries: Jack Kirby Vol. 1 (2004, hardcover, ISBN 0-7851-1574-9)
- Yellow Claw #4
  - "The Living Shadows" – Reprinted in Marvel Visionaries: Jack Kirby Vol. 2 (2006, hardcover, ISBN 0-7851-2094-7)
- Marvel Masterworks: Atlas Era - Black Knight/Yellow Claw reprints Black Knight (1955 Atlas) #1–5 (May 1955-April 1956) and Yellow Claw (1956 Atlas) #1–4 (October 1956–April 1957) (September 2, 2009, hardcover, ISBN 0-7851-3515-4)
