= The Knave of Diamonds (film) =

1921 British film by René Plaissetty

- Directed by: René Plaissetty
- Written by: Leslie Howard Gordon; Frank Miller
- Based on: The Knave of Diamonds by Ethel M. Dell
- Starring: Mary Massart; Alec Fraser; Cyril Percival
- Production company: Stoll Pictures
- Distributed by: Stoll Pictures
- Release date: July 1921
- Country: United Kingdom
- Languages: Silent; English intertitles

The Knave of Diamonds is a 1921 British silent drama film directed by René Plaissetty and starring Mary Massart, Alec Fraser and Cyril Percival. It is an adaptation of the 1913 novel of the same title by Ethel M. Dell.

== Cast ==
- Mary Massart as Lady Anne Carfax
- Alec Fraser as Nap Errol
- Cyril Percival as Lucas Errol
- Olaf Hytten as Sir Giles Carfax
- Annie Esmond as Mrs. Errol
- George Calliga as Tommy Hudson
- Stephen Wentworth as Dr. Capper

== Bibliography ==
- Goble, Alan. The Complete Index to Literary Sources in Film. Walter de Gruyter, 1999.
