= The Missioner =

1922 film

- Directed by: George Ridgwell
- Written by: E. Phillips Oppenheim (novel); Paul Rooff
- Starring: Cyril Percival; Pauline Peters; Olaf Hytten
- Production company: Stoll Pictures
- Distributed by: Stoll Pictures
- Release date: November 1922
- Country: United Kingdom
- Languages: Silent; English intertitles

The Missioner is a 1922 British silent crime film directed by George Ridgwell and starring Cyril Percival, Pauline Peters and Olaf Hytten.

== Cast ==
- Cyril Percival as Victor Manderson
- Pauline Peters as Wilhelmina Thorpe-Hatton
- Olaf Hytten as Stephen Hurd
- Lewis Gilbert as Jean de Roi
- Allan Jeayes as Gilbert Deyes
- Alice Ridgwell as Letty Fulton

== Bibliography ==
- Goble, Alan. The Complete Index to Literary Sources in Film. Walter de Gruyter, 1999.
