= The Knave of Diamonds (novel) =

1913 novel

- Author: Ethel M. Dell
- Language: English
- Genre: Drama
- Publisher: Unwin
- Publication date: 1913
- Publication place: United Kingdom
- Media type: Print

The Knave of Diamonds is a 1913 romance novel by the British writer Ethel M. Dell.

== Adaptation ==
In 1921 it was adapted by Stoll Pictures into a silent film of the same title directed by René Plaissetty.

== Bibliography ==
- Goble, Alan. The Complete Index to Literary Sources in Film. Walter de Gruyter, 1999.
- Vinson, James. Twentieth-Century Romance and Gothic Writers. Macmillan, 1982.
