= René Plaissetty =

American film director (1889–1955)

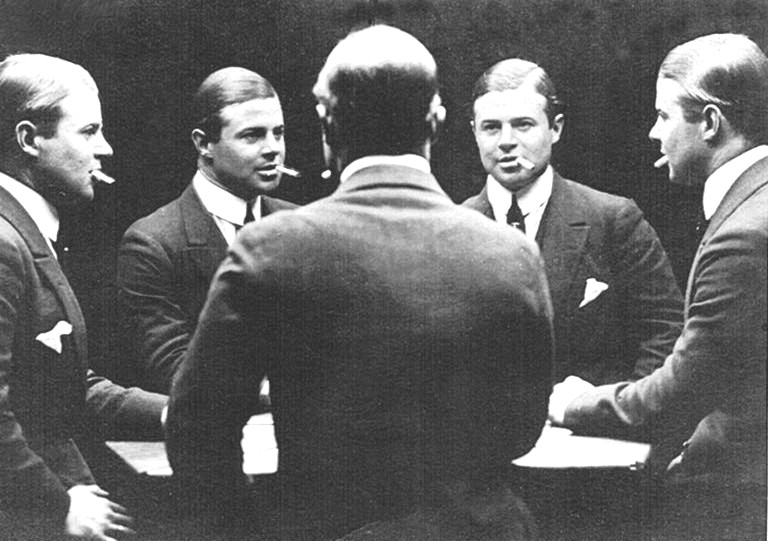
- René Plaissetty in the mirror, New York, ~1916
- Born: March 7, 1889; Chicago, Illinois; United States
- Died: January 4, 1955 (aged 65); Los Angeles, California; United States
- Occupations: Film director, film producer, film writer

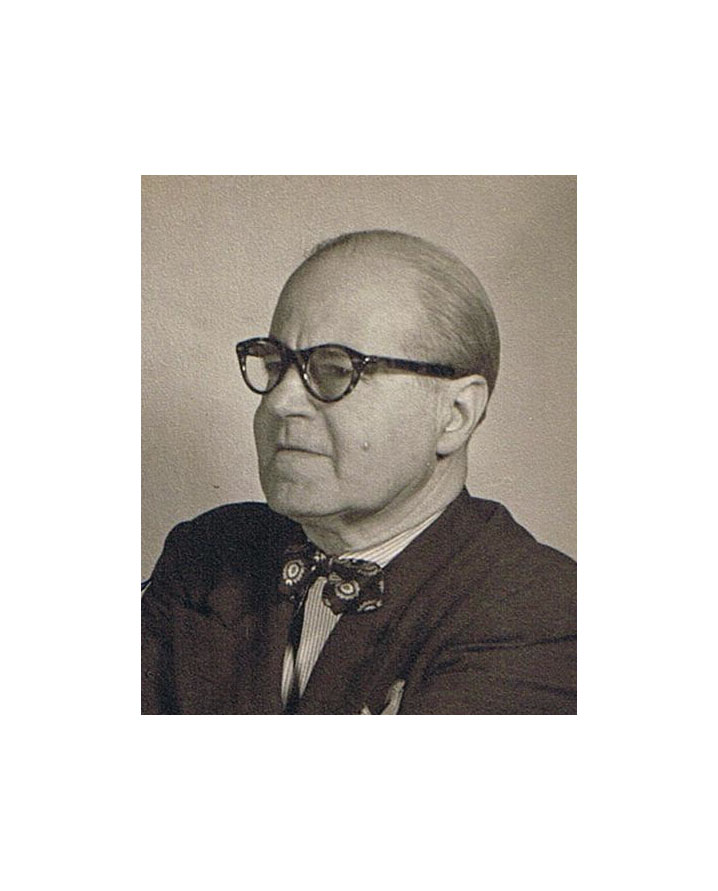
Plaissetty in 1954

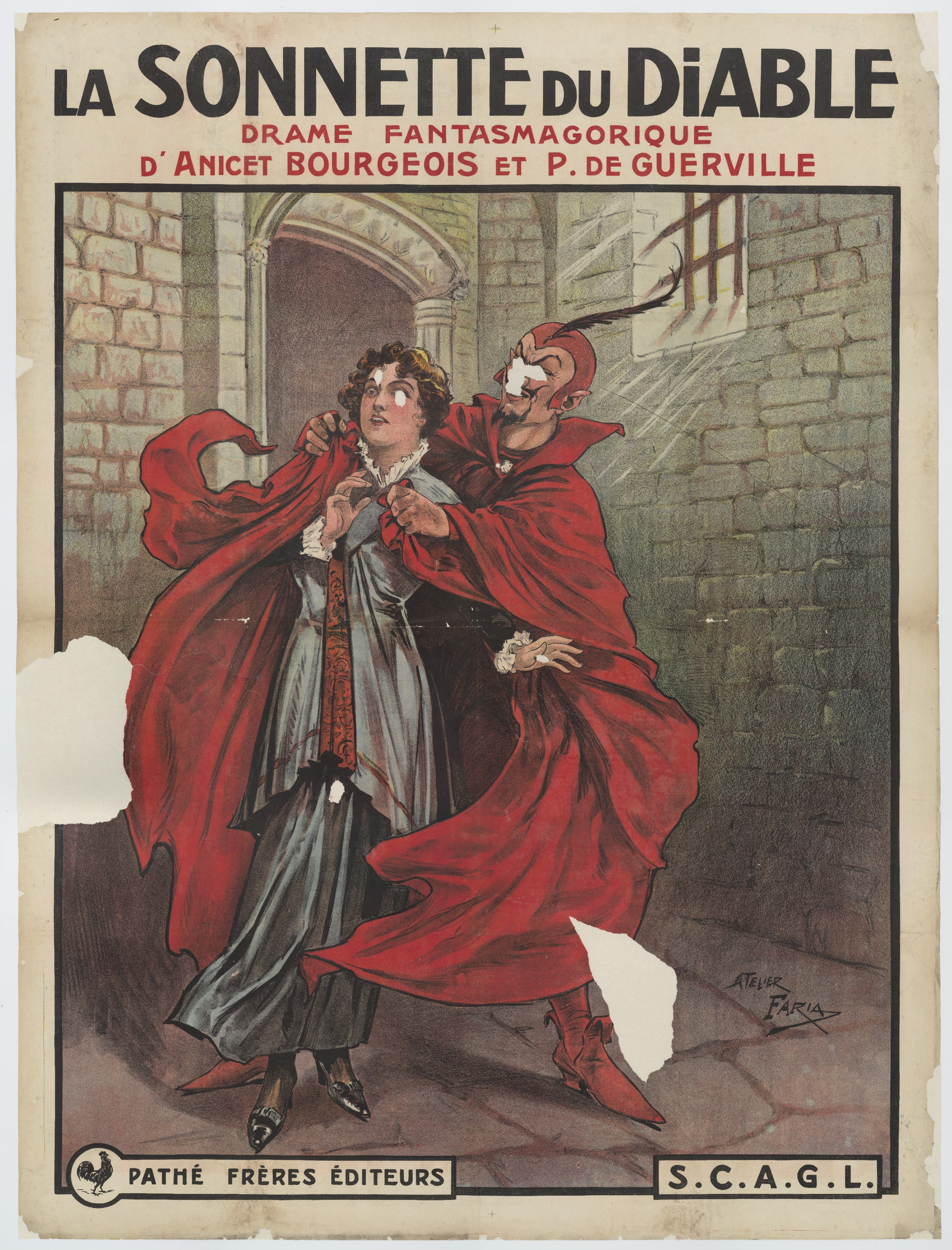
Poster for Plaissetty's French Pathé film La Sonnette du Diable. Drame fantasmagorique by Auguste Anicet-Bourgeois and P. Guerville, by Cândido de Faria, 1910–1919?. Collection EYE Film Institute Netherlands.

René Plaissetty (1889–1955) was an American film director.

Son of Achille Plaissetty, chemist and businessman and Corinne Bonnecaze, professor of singing, René Plaissetty was born on March 7, 1889, in Chicago.

In 1907 he came to live in France and later married Yvonne Lacroix, the daughter of Parisian couturier Jeanne Margaine-Lacroix and a French figure skating champion in 1908, with two daughters, Jacqueline in 1909 and Micheline in 1911. With the help of other administrators he founded his production company Filma.

In January 1920, leaving his factory to his assistant, he left for London where he returned to the studios with Mary Massart, who became his muse. His English feature films of 1920 and 1921 made for the Stoll Film Co are noticed by critics for their aesthetic and thematic qualities such as the strange Yellow Claw, according to a story by Sax Rohmer.

In 1922, he returned to Paris and turned to Gaumont (in the series Pax) My little boy with Leontine Massart, sister of Mary. Still with the same producer, with Mary Massart, he staged an adaptation of Maurice Level's novel L'Île sans nom. This eventful film (one sees in particular a shipwreck) receives a very favorable public and critical reception, due to the originality of the subject and the dramatic use of a new mode of communication, the Wireless telegraphy.

In 1923 René Plaissetty considered American cinema more suited to his projects. He then returned to the United States with Mary Massart to marry in Los Angeles (they will have a son, Francis Léo) and met the director and producer Edwin Carewe. He immediately proposed the adaptation of a novel by Louise Gérard to A Son of the Sahara published in 1922 in New York City.

In 1943, he made an appearance as an actor in the film Mission to Moscow, where he played Robert Coulondre, French ambassador to Berlin at the beginning of the war under the pseudonym Alex Caze.

René Plaissetty died on January 4, 1955, in Los Angeles. He is buried in the Montebello Cemetery in California.

== Selected filmography ==
- The Adventures of Harry Wilson in Russia (France, 1909)
- La Trace (France, série Harry Wilson, 1913)
- À tire d'ailes (France, série Harry Wilson, 1913)
- Le Legs (France, série Harry Wilson, 1914)
- La Main invisible (France, série Harry Wilson, 1914)
- Her Great Match with Vernon Steele (US, Production : Metro Pictures Corporation, 1915)
- The Wonderful Wager with Marion Sunshine (US, 1916)
- The Heart's Tribute with Vinnie Burns (US, 1916)
- Le Vol suprême with Gabrielle Robinne (France, Production : SCAGL, Pathé, 1917)
- Le Hussard with André Morgane (France, Production : SCAGL, Pathé, 1917)
- L'Heure sincère with Claude Garry et Maurice Lagrenée (France, Production : SCAGL, Pathé, 1917)
- Le masque de l'amour, 1ère époque : Le masque de Valcor with Mévisto (France, Production : SCAGL, Pathé, 1918)
- Le masque de l'amour, 2ème époque : Madame de Fermeuse with Jeanne Grumbach (France, Production : SCAGL, Pathé, 1918)
- Serpentin janissaire with Mary Massart et Marcel Lévesque, 1918
- Une étoile de cinéma with Germaine Dermoz and Georges Mauloy (France, Production : SCAGL, Pathé, 1919)
- Chignole with Armand Numès, 1919
- Vers l'argent with Mary Massart (France, 1920)
- The Yellow Claw or La Griffe jaune with Mary Massart and Kitty Fielder (UK, 1921)
- The Broken Road with Mary Massart (UK, 1921)
- The Four Feathers with Mary Massart and Harry Ham (UK, 1921)
- The Woman with the Fan or La Femme à l'éventail with Mary Massart and Alec Fraser (UK, 1921)
- The Knave of Diamonds or Le Valet de Carreau with Mary Massart and Cyril Percival (UK, 1921)
- L'Île sans nom avec Mary Massart et Paul Amiot (France, 1922)
- Mon p'tit avec Léontine Massart et Arlette Marchal (France, 1922)
- A Son of the Sahara réalisé par Edwin Carewe assisté de René Plaissetty (US, 1924)
- L'Homme (US, 1924)
- The Link (US, 1924)
- La Fumée jaune (US, 1924)
- J'ai fait du pied pour avoir la main with Nicole Robert (France, 1925)
- Le Faiseur de statuettes with Nicole Robert and Maurice de Féraudy (France, 1926)
- La Grande Envolée with Ann Harding (France, 1927)
- Chair ardente with Jean Marchat (France, 1932)
- Mission to Moscow (US, actor, 1943)
