= The Bars of Iron =

1916 novel

- 1930 edition
- Author: Ethel M. Dell
- Language: English
- Genre: Drama
- Publisher: Hutchinson; Putnam (US)
- Publication date: 1916
- Publication place: United Kingdom
- Media type: Print

The Bars of Iron (sometimes simply Bars of Iron) is a 1916 novel by the British writer Ethel M. Dell. It was one of four of Dell's novels to make the Publishers Weekly list of top ten bestselling books during the 1910s in America.

In 1920 it was adapted into a silent film of the same title by the British film studio Stoll Pictures. It was directed by Floyd Martin Thornton and featured Madge White and Joseph R. Tozer.

== Bibliography ==
- Barnett, Vincent L. & Weedon, Alexis. Elinor Glyn as Novelist, Moviemaker, Glamour Icon and Businesswoman. Routledge, 2016.
- Goble, Alan. The Complete Index to Literary Sources in Film. Walter de Gruyter, 1999.
- Vinson, James. Twentieth-Century Romance and Gothic Writers. Macmillan, 1982.
