= Bars of Iron =

1920 film

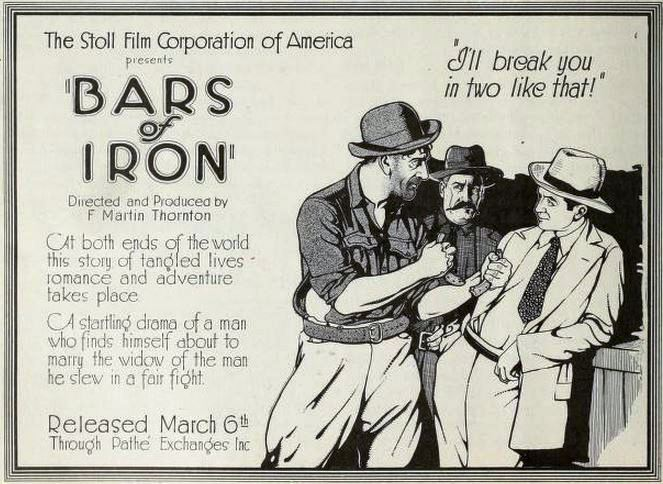
- Directed by: Floyd Martin Thornton
- Written by: F. Martin Thornton
- Based on: The Bars of Iron by Ethel M. Dell
- Production company: Stoll Pictures
- Distributed by: Stoll Pictures
- Release date: November 1920
- Country: United Kingdom
- Languages: Silent; English intertitles

Bars of Iron is a 1920 British silent drama film directed by F. Martin Thornton and starring Madge White, Rowland Myles and Joseph R. Tozer. It was based on a 1916 novel The Bars of Iron by Ethel M. Dell.

== Cast ==
- Madge White as Avery Denys
- Rowland Myles as Piers Evesham
- Joseph R. Tozer as Dr. Lennox Tudor
- Leopold McLaglen as Eric Denys
- Olga Conway as Ina Rose
- Eric Lankester as Sir Beverley Evesham
- Sydney Lewis Ransome as Rev. Lorimer
- Gertrude Sterroll as Mrs. Lorimer
- Gordon Webster as Dick Guyes
- J. Edwards Barker as Crowther

== Bibliography ==
- Goble, Alan. The Complete Index to Literary Sources in Film. Walter de Gruyter, 1999.
