= Alec Fraser (actor) =

British actor (1884–1956)

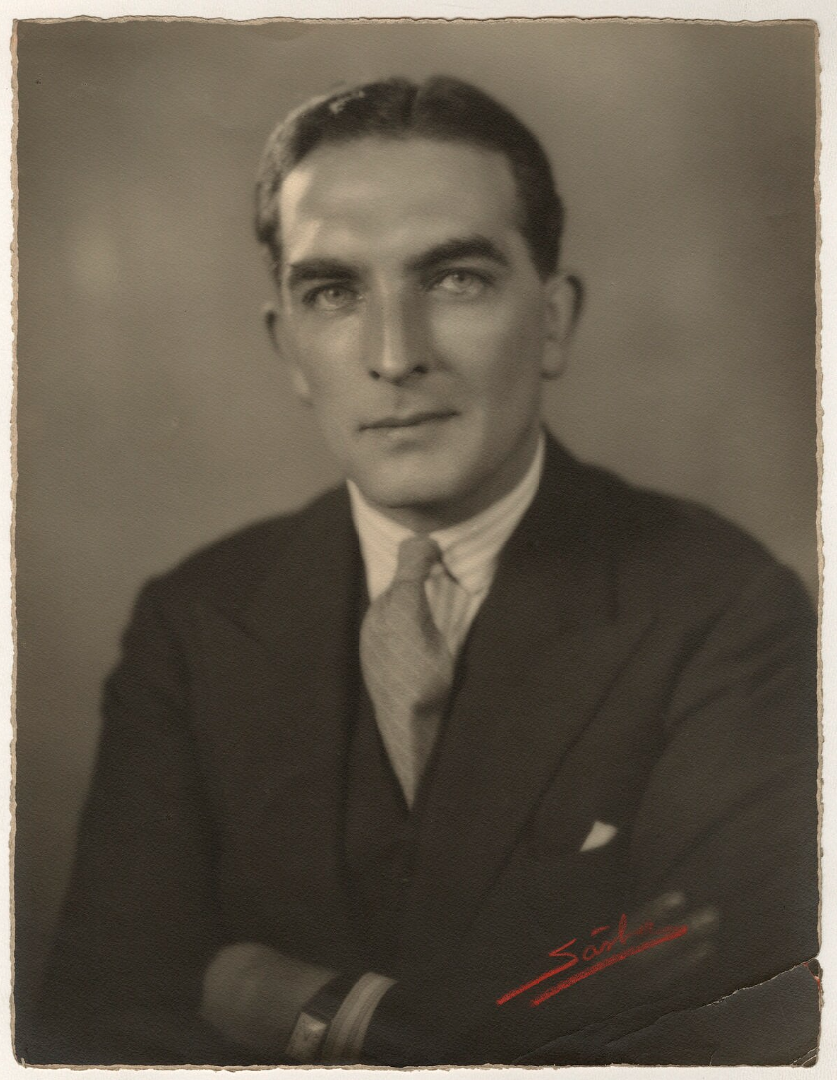
- Alec Fraser in 1927.
- Born: Alec Fraser-Smith; 16 February 1884; Cupar, Scotland
- Died: 20 June 1956 (aged 72); London, England
- Occupation: Actor

Alec Fraser (né Fraser-Smith; 16 February 1884 – 20 June 1956) was a British actor.

Alec Fraser was born Alec Fraser-Smith in Cupar, Scotland. He died on 20 June 1956, aged 72, in London. His sister was actress/singer Agnes Fraser.

== Selected filmography ==
- The Woman with the Fan (1921)
- The Woman of His Dream (1921)
- The Knave of Diamonds (1921)
- The Will (1921)
- The Bonnie Brier Bush (1921)
- Little Brother of God (1922)
- A Gamble in Lives (1924)
- The Lure (1933)
- The Great Defender (1934)
- The Mystery of the Mary Celeste (1935)
- The Mutiny of the Elsinore (1937)
