= The Top of the World (film) =

1925 film

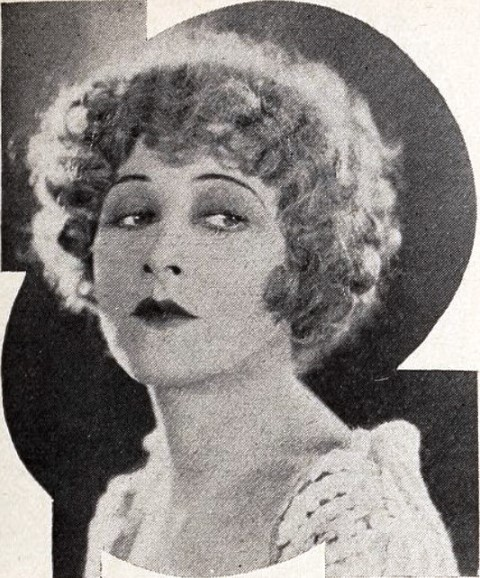
- Still with Nilsson
- Directed by: George Melford
- Screenplay by: Jack Cunningham
- Based on: The Top of the World by Ethel M. Dell
- Produced by: Jesse L. Lasky; Adolph Zukor
- Starring: James Kirkwood Sr. Anna Q. Nilsson; Joseph Kilgour; Mary Mersch; Raymond Hatton; Sheldon Lewis; Charles A. Post
- Cinematography: Charles G. Clarke
- Production company: Famous Players–Lasky Corporation
- Distributed by: Paramount Pictures
- Release date: February 9, 1925
- Running time: 70 minutes
- Country: United States
- Language: Silent (English intertitles)

The Top of the World is a 1925 American silent drama film directed by George Melford and starring James Kirkwood Sr., Anna Q. Nilsson, Joseph Kilgour, Mary Mersch, Raymond Hatton, Sheldon Lewis, and Charles A. Post. Based on a 1920 novel of the same title by Ethel M. Dell, the screenplay was written by Jack Cunningham. It was released on February 9, 1925, by Paramount Pictures.

== Cast ==
- James Kirkwood Sr. as Guy Ranger / Burke Ranger
- Anna Q. Nilsson as Sylvia Ingleton
- Joseph Kilgour as Sylvia's Father
- Mary Mersch as Her Stepmother
- Raymond Hatton as Capt. Preston
- Sheldon Lewis as 'Doctor' Kieff
- Charles A. Post as Hans
- Mabel Van Buren as Mary Ann
- Frank Jonasson as Joe
- Lorimer Johnston as Vreiboom
- Walter Johnson as Baseball Pitcher Walter Johnson (uncredited)

== Preservation ==
With no prints of The Top of the World located in any film archives, it is a lost film.
