= Gertrude Sterroll =

British actress

Gertrude Sterroll was a British stage and film actress.

She appeared in a number of theatrical productions during the early twentieth century and was active in both Silent era cinema and live performance. Her work included roles in drama and comedy, and she was noted for her contributions to the British performing arts scene of her time.

== Selected filmography ==
- Bars of Iron (1920)
- The Shadow Between (1920)
- Dicky Monteith (1922)
- Potter's Clay (1922)
- The Glorious Adventure (1922)
- The Wine of Life (1924)
- A Romance of Mayfair (1925)
- A Daughter in Revolt (1928)
- His Grace Gives Notice (1933)
- She Was Only a Village Maiden (1933)
