= Norman McKinnel =

Scottish actor (1870–1932)

- Born: 10 February 1870; Maxwelltown, Scotland
- Died: 29 March 1932 (aged 62); London, England
- Other names: Norman McKinnell
- Occupation: Actor
- Years active: 1894–1932
- Notable work: The Bishop's Candlesticks

Norman McKinnel (10 February 1870 – 29 March 1932) was a Scottish stage and film actor, active from the 1890s until his death. He appeared in many stage roles in the UK and overseas as well as featuring in a number of films, the best known of which is Alfred Hitchcock's 1927 production Downhill. His surname was sometimes mistranscribed as McKinnell.

== Early years ==
McKinnel was born in 1870 at Maxwelltown, Kirkcudbrightshire (since incorporated into Dumfries) and originally intended to follow his father into the engineering business before deciding to enter the acting profession. As a playwright he is known for the play, The Bishop's Candlesticks, an adaptation of a section of Victor Hugo's Les Misérables.

== Career ==
McKinnel's first stage appearance was in Clacton-on-Sea, Essex in 1894 and he soon based himself in London to further his career. He became known over the course of his career for playing many Shakespearian roles, and his stage work took him the U.S., Australia and South Africa. He was known for writing several easily stageable one-act plays, the most successful of which was The Bishop's Candlesticks (1901).

McKinnel's film career began in 1899 in King John, the earliest known example of Shakespeare on film. The work consisted of four brief scenes from the play, and a two-minute fragment survives at the EYE Film Institute in Amsterdam. McKinnel did not act on screen again until the mid-1910s, when he began to make further film appearances fitted in around his stage work. He played the title character in the original London production of Hobson's Choice in 1916. Notably, he appeared as the same character (Nathaniel Jeffcote) in three separate film versions of the same play Hindle Wakes, in 1918 and 1927 silent adaptations and again in 1931 in sound. In 1919 he played Paul Dombey in the first screen version of the Charles Dickens novel Dombey and Son. McKinnel's most widely known film to contemporary audiences is Hitchcock's Downhill, as the harsh but ultimately repentant patriarch opposite Ivor Novello.

== Death ==
McKinnel died of a heart attack in London on 29 March 1933, aged 62.

== Filmography ==
- King John (1899)
- The Shulamite (1915)
- Everybody's Business (1917)
- Mary Girl (1917)
- Dombey and Son (1917)
- Hindle Wakes (1918)
- Pillars of Society (1920)
- A Gamble in Lives (1920)
- The Fake (1927)
- Hindle Wakes (1927)
- Downhill (1927)
- Potiphar's Wife (1931)
- The Sleeping Cardinal (1931)
- The Outsider (1931)
- Hindle Wakes (1931)
- The Frightened Lady (1932)
- White Face (1932)
