= The Top of the World (novel) =

1920 novel by Ethel M. Dell

- Author: Ethel M. Dell
- Language: English
- Genre: Drama
- Publisher: Cassell
- Publication date: 1920
- Publication place: United Kingdom
- Media type: Print

The Top of the World is a 1920 novel by the British writer Ethel M. Dell.

== Adaptation ==
In 1925 it was adapted into an American silent film of the same title directed by George Melford and starring Anna Q. Nilsson.

== Bibliography ==
- Goble, Alan. The Complete Index to Literary Sources in Film. Walter de Gruyter, 1999.
- Vinson, James. Twentieth-Century Romance and Gothic Writers. Macmillan, 1982.
