= The Oath (1921 British film) =

1921 film

The Oath is a 1921 British silent drama film directed by Fred Paul and starring Margot Drake and Lewis Gilbert. Part of a Grand Guignol series of films, it focuses on a promise made by a Priest in the eighteenth century to protect his brother's family.

== Cast ==
- Margot Drake - Lizette
- Lewis Gilbert - The Priest
