= The Queen of Spades (1927 film) =

1927 film

- Directed by: Aleksandr Razumny
- Written by: Alexander Pushkin (short story); Charlie Roellinghoff; Arthur Bárdos
- Starring: Jenny Jugo; Rudolf Forster; Henri de Vries
- Cinematography: Carl Drews
- Music by: Willy Schmidt-Gentner; Erich Nitzschmann
- Production company: Phoebus Film
- Distributed by: Phoebus Film
- Release date: August 1927
- Running time: unknown
- Country: Germany
- Languages: Silent; German intertitles

The Queen of Spades or Pique Dame is a 1927 German silent horror film directed by Aleksandr Razumny and starring Jenny Jugo, Rudolf Forster, and Henri de Vries. It is one of many film adaptations of the Russian writer Alexander Pushkin's 1834 short story "Pikovaya Dama" ("The Queen of Spades") and follows his story closely. It is an example of German Expressionism so prevalent there following the success of The Cabinet of Dr. Caligari in 1919. The film's sets were designed by art director Franz Schroedter.

== Plot ==
Tomski, a Russian soldier, mentions to the other soldiers playing cards with him that, years before, his grandmother, the Countess Tomski, told him that an old sorcerer had bestowed upon her a supernatural secret to winning at cards. Another soldier named Hermann later manages to sneak into the Countess' house and tries to wrest the secret from her. The old woman dies of fright, and later her ghost returns to haunt Hermann, driving him insane.

== Cast ==
- Jenny Jugo as Lisa
- Rudolf Forster as Tomski the soldier
- Alexandra Schmitt as the Countess Tomski
- Walter Janssen as Hermann
- Henri de Vries as Tomski's Uncle
- Alexander Murski
- Auguste Prasch-Grevenberg as Hermann's Mother
- Robert Scholz
- Ferdinand von Alten

== Bibliography ==
- Bock, Hans-Michael; Bergfelder, Tim, eds. (2009). The Concise Cinegraph: Encyclopaedia of German Cinema. New York: Berghahn Books. ISBN 978-1-57181-655-9.
- Workman, Christopher; Howarth, Troy (2016). Tome of Terror: Horror Films of the Silent Era. Baltimore: Midnight Marquee Press. ISBN 978-1-936168-68-2.
