= The Mystery of Room 13 =

1915 silent film

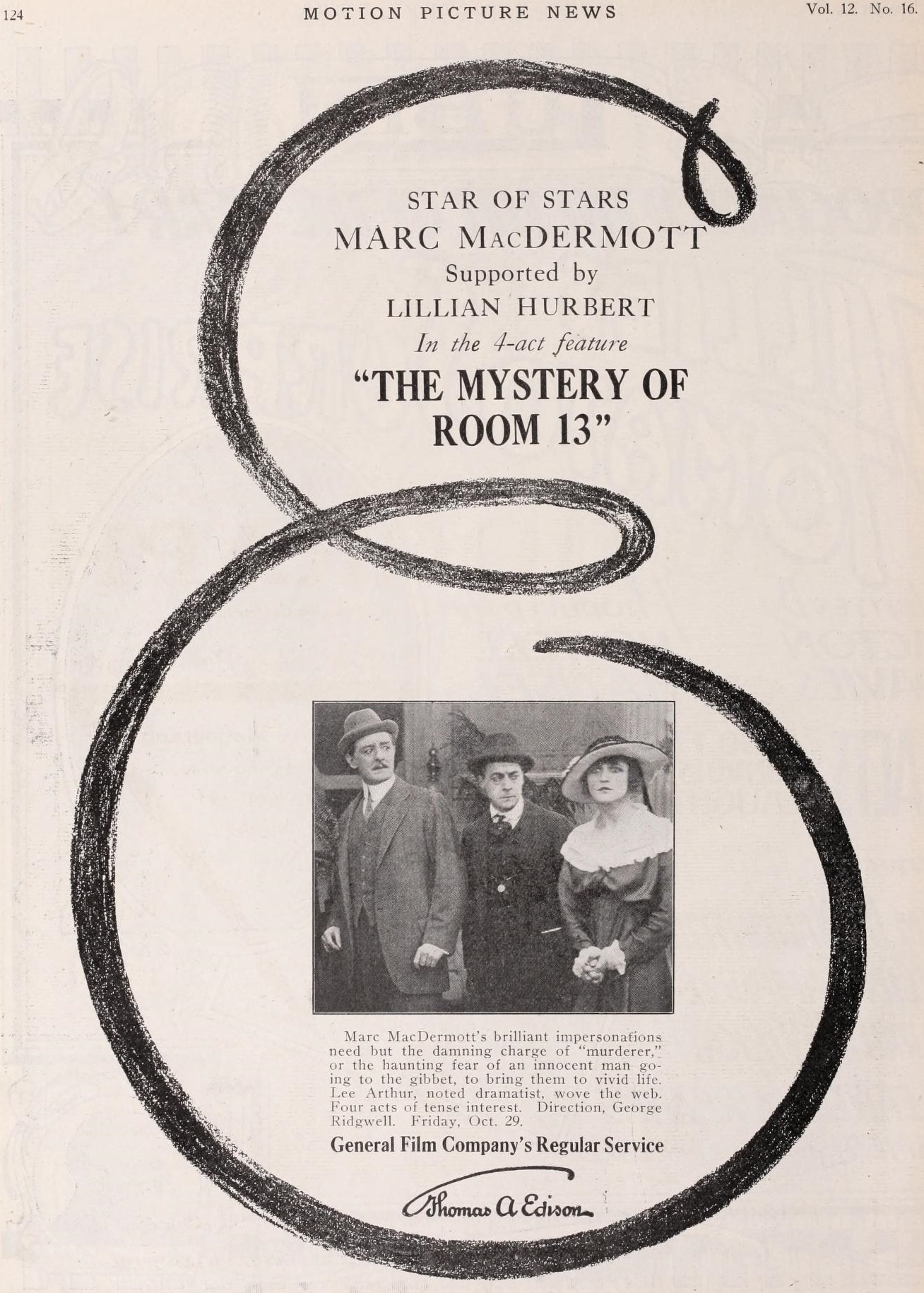
- Directed by: George Ridgwell
- Written by: Lee Arthur
- Starring: Marc McDermott; Lillian Herbert; Guido Colucci
- Production company: Edison Studios
- Distributed by: General Film Company
- Release date: October 29, 1915
- Running time: 4 reels
- Country: United States
- Languages: Silent; English intertitles

The Mystery of Room 13 is a 1915 American silent mystery film directed by George Ridgwell and starring Marc McDermott, Lillian Herbert and Guido Colucci.

== Cast ==
- Marc McDermott as Clay Foster
- Lillian Herbert as June Baxter
- Guido Colucci as Count Giuseppe Rizzo
- Carlton S. King as Bruce Spencer
- T. Tamamoto as Antonio Guerrio
- Lena Davril as Phillipa Guerrio
- Margery Bonney Erskine as Mrs. Montague
- George A. Wright as The Waiter

== Bibliography ==
- Ken Wlaschin. Silent Mystery and Detective Movies: A Comprehensive Filmography. McFarland, 2009.
