= Yvonne Lacroix =

French figure skater

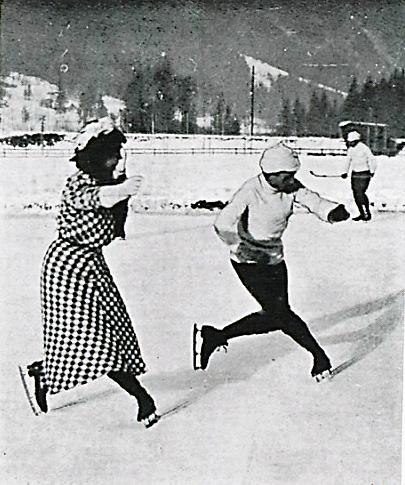
Yvonne Lacroix skating with Charles Sabouret (1907)

Yvonne Margaine-Lacroix (November 9, 1892 – June 28, 1944) was a French figure skater of the early 20th-century. In 1909 she became the first woman crowned champion of France in the French Figure Skating Championships.

== Biography ==
Yvonne Lacroix was born at her parents' home in Paris in 1892. She was the daughter of Philippe Léonard Lacroix, a tailor, and Jeanne Margaine-Lacroix, a famous couturier and the head of the Margaine-Lacroix fashion house.

On April 27, 1909, in Herblay-sur-Seine she married the Franco-American filmmaker and producer René Plaissetty (1889-1955). The couple had two children: Jacqueline (1909-1993) and Micheline Plaissetty (1911-1983).

In 1914 at the start of World War I the couple and their children moved to the safety of the United States, living in New Orleans, New York and Philadelphia. They returned to Paris in 1916 and divorced in October 1918.

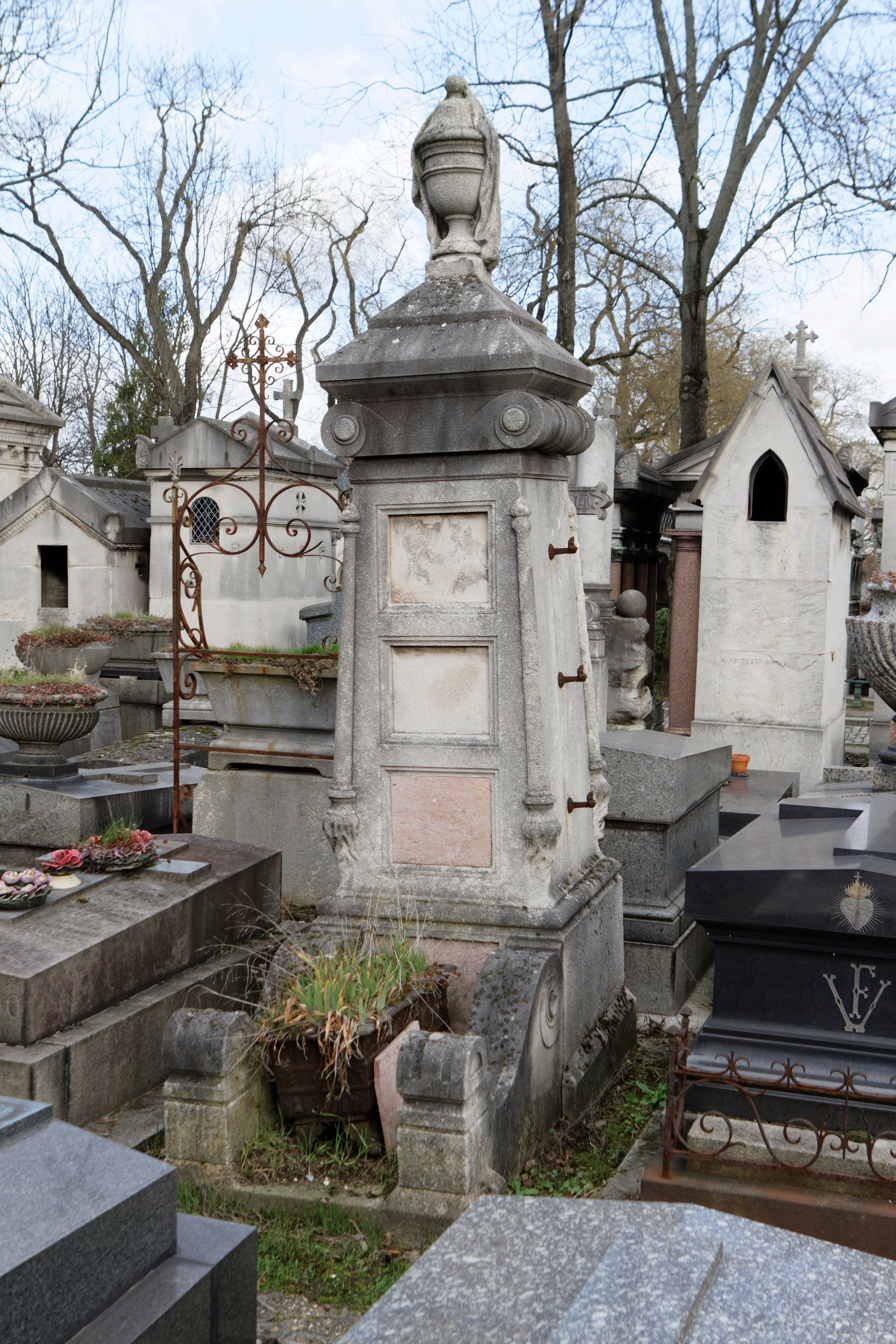
The Lacroix family grave in Père Lachaise Cemetery in Paris

On December 18, 1920, in Paris she married Georges Max David. They divorced in 1932. By 1938 she was working as a seamstress in Paris.

Yvonne Lacroix died on June 28, 1944, at her home, 37 rue Boissy-d'Anglas, in Paris. She was buried with her parents and grandmother in the family grave at Père Lachaise Cemetery in Paris on July 1, 1944.

== Awards ==
In 1907 she won the waltz competition at the Palais de Glace in Paris with her partner Charles Sabouret. They beat the couple Madame Magnus and her husband Louis Magnus who was the French Men's Figure Skating Champion in singles from 1908 to 1911.

In 1907 and 1908 she was champion of the Club des Patineurs de Paris.

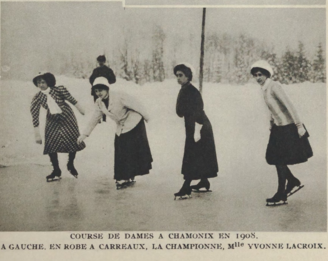
Yvonne Lacroix (left) in a speed skating race

On January 18, 1909, she was crowned French figure skating champion in a competition organised by the USFSA. She thus became the first woman to obtain this title among the ladies. This French championship was held in Chamonix, but the women's events were held in Paris, at the Palais de Glace, on January 18. There were only two competitors, Yvonne Lacroix winning the competition ahead of Anita Nahmias by 138 points to Nahmias' 130.
