= The Tidal Wave =

1920 film

- Directed by: Sinclair Hill
- Written by: Sinclair Hill
- Starring: Poppy Wyndham; Sydney Seaward; Annie Esmond
- Cinematography: John Mackenzie
- Production company: Stoll Pictures
- Distributed by: Stoll Pictures
- Release date: August 1920
- Country: United Kingdom
- Languages: Silent; English intertitles

The Tidal Wave is a 1920 British silent drama film directed by Sinclair Hill and starring Poppy Wyndham, Sydney Seaward and Pardoe Woodman. It is based on a short story by Ethel M. Dell. A fisherman rescues an artist from the sea, and falls in love with her.

== Cast ==
- Poppy Wyndham as Columbine
- Sydney Seaward as Matt Brewster
- Pardoe Woodman as Frank Knight
- Annie Esmond as Aunt Liza
- Judd Green as Adam Brewster

== Bibliography ==
- Low, Rachael. History of the British Film, 1918-1929. George Allen & Unwin, 1971.
