= Joe Maneely =

American comic book artist (1926–1958)

- Born: Joseph Maneely; February 18, 1926 Philadelphia, Pennsylvania, U.S.
- Died: June 7, 1958 (aged 32) Manhattan, New York City, U.S.
- Area: Artist

Joseph Maneely (/məˈniːli/; February 18, 1926 – June 7, 1958) was an American comic book artist best known for his work at Marvel Comics' 1950s predecessor, Atlas Comics, where he co-created the Marvel characters the Black Knight, the Ringo Kid, the Yellow Claw, and Jimmy Woo.

Maneely worked at Atlas with Steve Ditko and John Romita, Sr. Writer/editor Stan Lee commented that, "Joe Maneely to me would have been the next Jack Kirby. He also could draw anything, make anything look exciting, and I actually think he was even faster than Jack." Talented and well-respected, he died in a commuter-train accident shortly before Marvel's ascendancy into a commercial and pop-cultural conglomerate.

== Biography ==
=== Early life and career ===
Black Knight #1 (May 1955). Cover art by Maneely. "The Black Knight was [his] signature character and the graphic image most associated with him."

Joe Maneely, born and raised in Philadelphia, Pennsylvania, was one of at least five children born to a poor couple, Robert and Gertrude Maneely. He attended Ascension BVM Elementary School and Northeast Catholic High School; at the latter, he created a school mascot, the Red Falcon, that also starred in a comic strip in the school newspaper. After dropping out in his sophomore year, he enlisted in the U.S. Navy, serving three years as a specialist in visual aids and contributing cartoons to ship newspapers.

Under the G.I. Bill, Maneely trained at the Hussian School of Art in Philadelphia. He entered the professional realm in the advertising art department of the Philadelphia Bulletin newspaper. He began his comic book career freelancing for Street & Smith in 1948, drawing such features as "Butterfingers", "Django Jinks, Ghost Chaser", "Dr. Savant", "Mario Nette", "Nick Carter", "Public Defender", "Roger Kilgore", "Supersnipe", and "Ulysses Q. Wacky" in comics including The Shadow, Top Secrets, Ghost Breakers and Super Magician Comics. His earliest known credits are that company's Top Secrets #4 (Aug. 1948), for which he penciled and inked the eight-page crime fiction story "The Ragged Stranger"; and Red Dragon #4 (Aug. 1948), for which he drew the eight-page story "Death by the Sword" and the one-page featurette "Tao's Small Sword Box", both starring the hero Tao Anwar.

Other nascent work includes the seven-page story "Washington's Scout" in Hillman Periodicals' Airboy Comics vol. 6, #10 (Nov. 1949), and a small amount of work on the Catholic comic-book Treasure Chest.

With artist Peggy Zangerle and Hussian classmate George Ward — an artist for periodicals including the Philadelphia Bulletin and the New York Daily News and a 1950s assistant on Walt Kelly's comic strip Pogo — Maneely formed an art studio at Philadelphia's Flo-Mar Building, at 3160 Kensington Avenue, Room 501.

=== Atlas Comics ===
Maneely then found work at publisher Martin Goodman's Marvel Comics predecessor, Timely Comics, as it was transitioning to its 1950s incarnation as Atlas Comics. His first published story there was the eight-page Western story "The Kansas Massacre of 1864" in Western Outlaws And Sheriffs #60 (Dec. 1949). However, historian Michael J. Vassallo, dating stories by Atlas' published job-numbers, suggests the first Atlas story to which Maneely contributed was the later-published "The Mystery of the Valley of Giants" in Black Rider #8 (March 1950), an 18-page story drawn by many uncredited artists, including Syd Shores; Maneely's work appears on page three, with some additional minor inking on five other pages.

Maneely soon hit his stride at Atlas, for which he freelanced before going on staff "in about 1955." Until 1953, when Maneely and his family moved to the Flushing neighborhood in the New York City borough of Queens, he traveled from Philadelphia to New York three times weekly to pick up scripts. In either 1954 or 1955, the family moved to suburban New Shrewsbury, New Jersey (later renamed Tinton Falls).

With speed to match his style, he became a favorite of editor-in-chief Stan Lee, who assigned Maneely covers and stories throughout virtually the entire range of Atlas comics. With superheroes experiencing a lull in popularity, Maneely drew Westerns, war, horror, humor, romance, science fiction, spy, crime, and even period-adventure stories — that last most notably with the medieval series Black Knight, co-created by Maneely and writer and editor-in-chief Lee, and first reprinted in 1960s Marvel Comics at the behest of editor Roy Thomas, who as a teen had "devoured the Black Knight comic, and became an immediate fan."

Yellow Claw #1 (Oct. 1956). Cover art by Maneely

Marvel artist Herb Trimpe said fellow artist Marie Severin, who had worked with Maneely at Atlas, had described "his pencils [as] almost nonexistent; they were like rough, lightly done layouts with no features on the faces ... It was just like ovals and sticks and stuff, and he inked from that. He drew when he inked. That's when he did the work, in the inking!" Stan Lee confirmed that "Joe almost inked without penciling." Columnist and historian Fred Hembeck said, "While we may've heard of the pivotal day a young [John] Romita spent with the tragically doomed yet immensely talented artist Joe Maneely, listening to him describe it as one of the most important days of his entire life gives the familiar tale an added gravity."

Other Atlas work reprinted widely by Marvel in the 1960s and 1970s include Yellow Claw #1 (Oct. 1956) — starring a Fu Manchu-inspired villain and the Asian FBI agent pursuing him, created by Maneely and writer Al Feldstein — and the Old West Ringo Kid #1-21 (Aug. 1954 - Sept. 1957), co-created with an unknown writer.

The covers of Sub-Mariner Comics #37, 39 and 41 (December 1954, April and August 1955) were Maneely's only superhero work for Atlas, during the company's short-lived mid-1950s attempt to revive superheroes.

Maneely's talent, range and prolificity impressed fellow Atlas artists. Stan Goldberg in 2002 recalled "the all-time great Joe Maneely, ... who I thought was the best artist that ever drew comics. ... Joe wasn't just a great craftsman; he worked so fast and he was one of the few artists who could go from drawing the Black Knight to drawing Petey the Pest, or a war story. He had an unbelievable knack and he was just one sweet, nice guy." Goldberg recalled in 2005, "He worked so fast, we used to call him 'Joe Money'."

Maneely's distinctive style, wrote historian Vassallo, was, "Crisp, uniquely inked, busy, and action oriented. Not necessarily pretty, but vivid. It was a style unique to comics and difficult to imitate." By 1955, "Maneely's inking had stylized itself to a precision 'etching' effect, and he would enter a fruitful year that would see him turn out his most diverse and prolific work."

By the summer of 1957, Atlas was experiencing difficulties and began shedding freelancers. Shortly afterward, Martin Goodman stopped distributing his own titles and switched to American News Company, which soon closed, temporarily leaving Atlas without a distributor and resulting in all staff, other than Lee, being fired. Maneely continued to work with Lee on the Chicago Sun-Times-syndicated comic strip Mrs. Lyons' Cubs, which debuted in newspapers February 10, 1958. He also did a limited amount of freelancing for DC Comics during this time, including for the supernatural / fantasy anthologies House of Secrets and Tales of the Unexpected; Charlton Comics; and Crestwood Publications.

Maneely, additionally, drew a four-page comic about Social Security for the U.S. Department of Health, Education, and Welfare, "John's First Job" (1956), and another for the same agency, "A Farm and a Family."

=== Death ===
On the night of his death, "past midnight of what was early Sunday morning," June 7, 1958, Maneely had dined hours earlier with fellow laid-off Atlas colleagues, including George Ward and John Severin, in Manhattan. He did not have his glasses with him, and was killed when he accidentally fell between the cars of a moving commuter train on his way home to New Jersey.

Fellow Atlas artist Stan Goldberg recalled that on the night of Maneely's death,

... Joe [told] me that he'd been in the city the week before and had lost his glasses. He didn't even know how he'd gotten home that day. So this day came and he went out drinking and went out to get some air between the trains, and he fell off the train. When they found him, he was still clutching his portfolio. I remember [production staffer] Danny Crespi calling me on Saturday morning to break the news. ... The family had a rough time after he died. The Maneelys had daughters and a lot of bills. They had just bought a big house, too, and didn't have any money put away.

His last original published story was the five-page Ringo Kid tale, "One Bullet Left," in Gunsmoke Western #53 (July 1959), and his final published comics work was the cover of Gunsmoke Western #55 (November 1959), featuring Kid Colt and Wyatt Earp. Historian Ger Apeldoorn believes Maneely's last drawn work was published earlier: the first page of the eight-page story "The Revenge of Roaring Bear" in Two-Gun Kid #45 (Dec. 1958), which was completed by a different artist (Jack Davis), and bears the highest published job number (T-67) of Maneely's work.

Marvel editor-in-chief Stan Lee opined in the early 2000s that had Maneely lived, "he would have been another Jack Kirby. He would have been the best you could imagine."

== Personal life ==
In 1947, following his discharge from the U.S. Navy, Maneely married his childhood sweetheart, Elizabeth "Betty Jean" Kane (died April 16, 2003). Their first child, daughter Kathleen, was born in 1950. They would have two more, daughters Mary Carole, born 1951, and Nancy, born 1956.
