= Peggy Carlisle =

British actress

Peggy Carlisle was a British actress.

== Selected filmography ==
- The Man and the Moment (1918)
- Comradeship (1919)
- The Rocks of Valpre (1919)
- God's Good Man (1919)
- Broken Bottles (1920)
- Motherland (1927)
- Hindle Wakes (1927)
- Houp La! (1928)
