= The Yellow Claw (film) =

1921 British silent crime film

- Directed by: René Plaissetty
- Written by: Sax Rohmer (novel); Gerard Fort Buckle
- Produced by: Oswald Stoll
- Starring: Sydney Seaward; Arthur M. Cullin; Harvey Braban; Annie Esmond
- Cinematography: Jack E. Cox
- Production company: Stoll Pictures
- Distributed by: Stoll Pictures
- Release date: January 1921
- Running time: 6,200 feet
- Country: United Kingdom
- Languages: Silent; English intertitles

The Yellow Claw is a 1921 British silent crime film directed by René Plaissetty and starring Sydney Seaward, Arthur M. Cullin and Harvey Braban. The film was shot partly at Cricklewood Studios and ran 68 minutes. It was based on the 1915 novel The Yellow Claw by Sax Rohmer, in which a French detective battles a notorious master criminal named Mr. King.

== Plot ==
A frightened woman is murdered in the London apartment of a well-known novelist named Henry Leroux. The police arrest Leroux's butler, but he escapes and runs off to a mysterious opium den, the lair of a drug dealer named Mister King. Gaston Max, a detective from Paris, arrives in London to investigate the drug trafficking. Although the police take down the gang, Mr. King escapes and manages to keep his true identity a secret.

== Cast ==
- Sydney Seaward as Inspector Dunbar
- Arthur M. Cullin as Dr. Cumberley
- Harvey Braban as Gaston Max
- Annie Esmond as Denise Ryland
- Norman Page as Soames
- Kitty Fielder as Lady of the Poppies
- Kiyoshi Takase as Ho-Pin
- A.C. Fotheringham-Lysons as Henry Leroux
- Mary Massart as Helen Cumberley
- Cyril Percival as John Howard Edel
- Ivy King as Mrs. Leroux
- June Tripp as Mrs. Vernon
- Eric Albury as Gianopolis
- Geoffrey Benstead as Sowerby

== Other Stoll Pictures productions on the same theme ==
Producer Stoll went on to release another xenophobic Yellow Peril film called Mr. Wu in 1919 (which was remade in 1927 with Lon Chaney in the lead), a 15-film Fu Manchu series called The Mystery of Dr. Fu Manchu in 1923, and an eight-film series in 1924 called The Further Mysteries of Dr. Fu Manchu, both series starring Harry Agar Lyons as Fu.

== Sources ==
- Low, Rachael (1971). History of the British Film, 1918-1929. George Allen & Unwin.
- Workman, Christopher; Howarth, Troy (2016). Tome of Terror: Horror Films of the Silent Era. Midnight Marquee Press. p. 231. ISBN 978-1936168-68-2.
