= Henri de Vries =

Dutch actor (1864–1949)

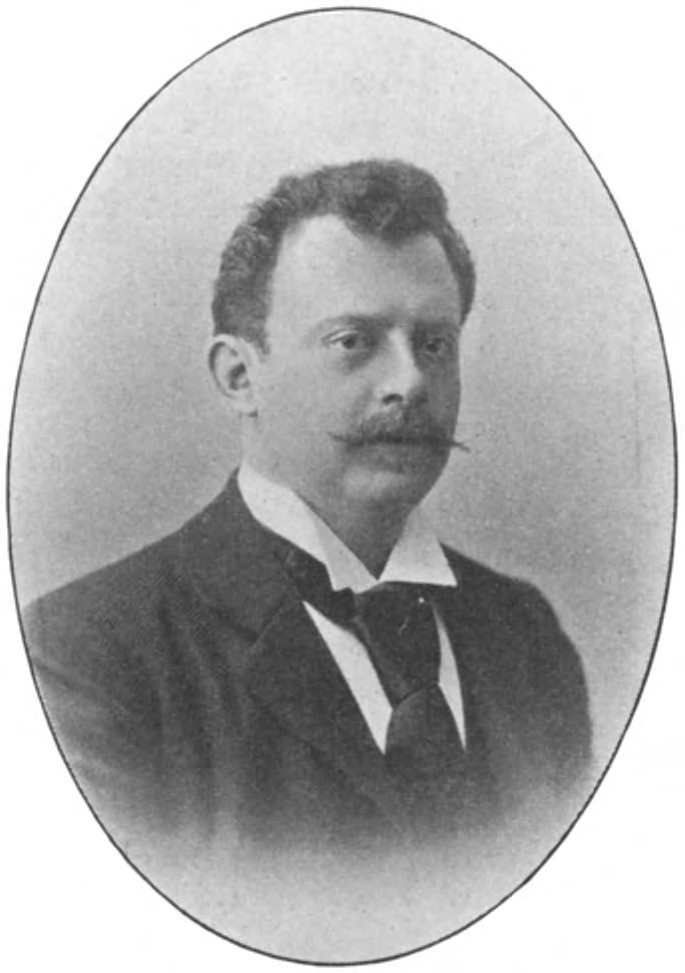
Henri de Vries ca. 1899

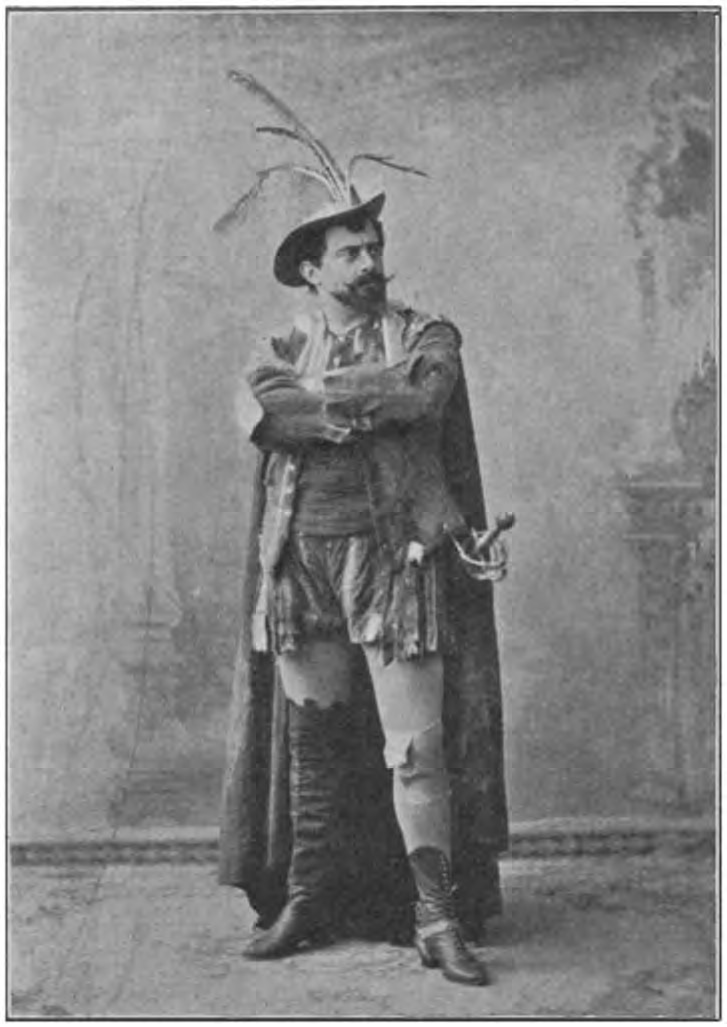
De Vries on stage as Petruchio in Shakespear's The Taming of the Shrew ca. 1899

Henri de Vries (8 August 1864 in Rotterdam – 31 January 1949 in Amsterdam), born Hendricus Petrus Lodewicus van Walterop, was a Dutch actor.

== Partial filmography ==
- Cleopatra (1917)
- The Night Hawk (1921)
- The Woman Who Obeyed (1923)
- The World Wants To Be Deceived (1926)
- The Brothers Schellenberg (1926)
- Should We Be Silent? (1926)
- The Convicted (1927)
- The Queen of Spades (1927)
- How Do I Marry the Boss? (1927)
- The Champion of the World (1927)
- Venus in Evening Wear (1927)
- White Cargo (1929)
- The Celestial City (1929)
- Murder at Covent Garden (1932)
- The Scarab Murder Case (1936)
- Strange Experiment (1937)
- Wilton's Zoo (1939)
