= Cyril Percival =

Welsh actor (1889–1948)

- Born: 19 October 1889; Dolgellau, Gwynedd, United Kingdom
- Died: 27 July 1948 (aged 58); Great Missenden, Buckinghamshire, United Kingdom
- Occupation: Actor
- Years active: 1915–1923 (film)

Cyril Percival (1889–1948) was a British film actor during the silent era.

== Selected filmography ==
- Love in a Wood (1915)
- The Princess of Happy Chance (1917)
- London Pride (1920)
- The Town of Crooked Ways (1920)
- The Duchess of Seven Dials (1920)
- The Sport of Kings (1921)
- The Broken Road (1921)
- The Knave of Diamonds (1921)
- The Woman with the Fan (1921)
- The Magistrate (1921)
- The Yellow Claw (1921)
- The Missioner (1922)
- Wee MacGregor's Sweetheart (1922)

== Bibliography ==
- Goble, Alan. The Complete Index to Literary Sources in Film. Walter de Gruyter, 1999.
