= The Broken Road (film) =

1921 silent drama film by René Plaissetty

- Directed by: René Plaissetty
- Based on: The Broken Road by A.E.W. Mason
- Starring: Harry Ham, Mary Massart, Tony Fraser, June Putnam, Robert English, Cyril Percival, William Crundall, Hugh Westlake, Charles Wemyss
- Release date: 1921
- Country: United Kingdom
- Language: Silent

The Broken Road is a 1921 British silent drama film directed by René Plaissetty and starring Harry Ham, Mary Massart, and Tony Fraser. Three generations of a British family work to build a road in India. It was based on the 1907 novel The Broken Road by A.E.W. Mason.

== Cast ==
- Harry Ham as Dick Linforth
- Mary Massart as Violet Oliver
- Tony Fraser as Shere Ali
- June Putnam as Phyllis Carson
- Robert English as Luffe
- Cyril Percival as Sir John
- William Crundall as Major Dawes
- Hugh Westlake as Doctor Bodley
- Charles Wemyss as Captain Phillips
