= Jeanne Margaine-Lacroix =

Clothes designer (1868 -1930)

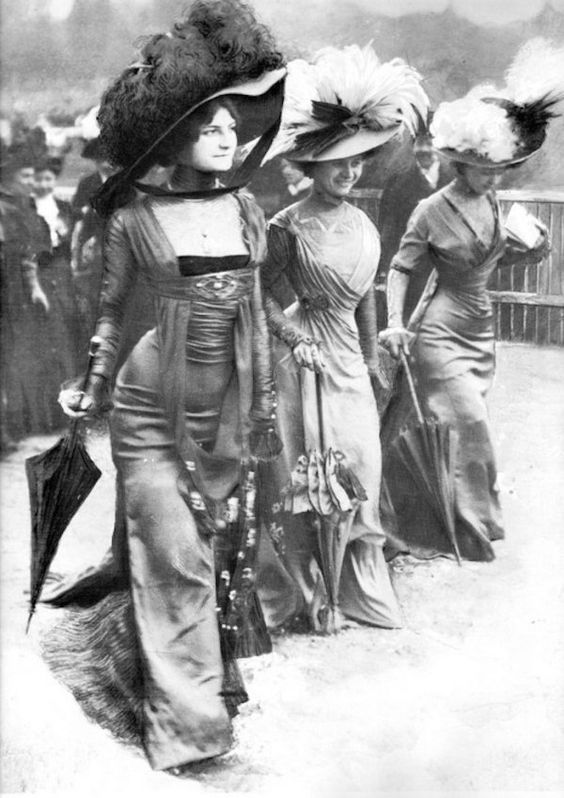
The scandal of Jeanne Margaine-Lacroix's dresses was on the front page of L'Illustration in May 1908

Jeanne Victorine Margaine-Lacroix (3 December 1868–15 August 1930) was a French couturier of the early 20th-century. The House Margaine-Lacroix is mainly known today for having revolutionized the world of fashion by creating the so-called Sylphide or Tanagréenne dress, cut to be worn without a corset.

Born in Paris in 1868, she was the daughter of couturier Armandine Fresnais-Margaine (1835-1899) and watchmaker François Arsène Margaine. In 1889 she married Philippe Léonard Lacroix (1862-1924), a tailor. Their daughter, Yvonne Lacroix (1892-1944), became in 1909 the first woman crowned champion of France in figure skating.

Maison Margaine was founded in Paris in 1889 by Mme. Armandine Fresnais-Margaine. At the Exposition Universelle in Paris in 1889, the Margaine house obtained a gold medal for its creations and the press already was commenting on the contribution of Jeanne Margaine-Lacroix, the designer's daughter, in particular for her flower designs.

The house was renamed Maison Margaine-Lacroix when Jeanne Margaine-Lacroix assumed ownership on the death of her mother in 1899. Margaine-Lacroix was a member of the Collectivité de la Couture which exhibited models in the Salon des Lumières at the 1900 Exposition Universelle in Paris.

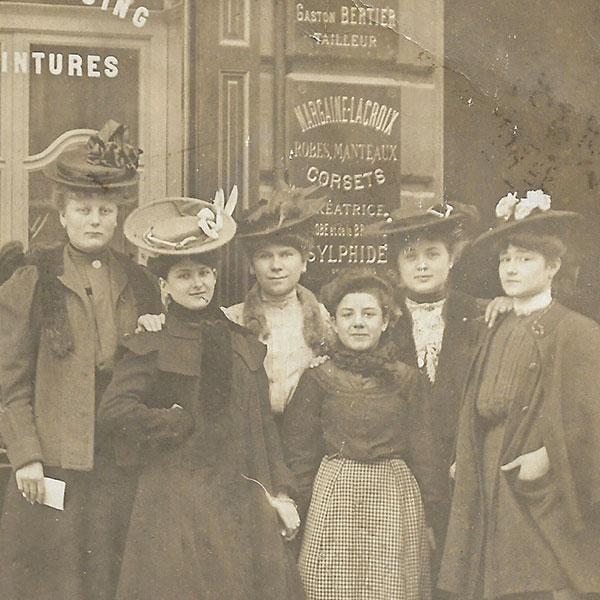
Employees of the Margaine-Lacroix house posing in front of 19 boulevard Haussman in 1906

The Margaine-Lacroix fashion house was largely forgotten by historians of fashion for many years, but recently scholars have rediscovered the impact the house had on couture in the early 20th-century. Its innovations included the then popular robe styles "Tanagra" in 1889 which was worn with a modified corset. This was followed in 1904 by "Sylphide", which caused a stir among fashionistas of the time as its design replaced stays with an "ingenious" built-in stretchy lining. Jeanne Margaine-Lacroix "worked closely with manufacturers to develop modernized soft knit and front-lacing undergarments that enabled greater freedom of motion". Wanting women to look more natural, she removed traditional corsets from her designs in favour of soft knit and front-lacing underwear, which caused a sensation at the time as her designs revealed the shape of the wearer's body under the outfit instead of the shape of the corset. She said, "suppleness is demanded by women, because that alone gives 'line'. Stiff, hard bands cannot meet their wishes."

On 10 May 1908 three of her models caused a sensation during The Prix du Prince de Galles at Longchamp Racecourse by presenting a new slim and free line which press called "the directoire gown". The three models were called "Les Nouvelles Merveilleuses" by the press, referring to the semi-naked beauties of the French Revolutionary period. It seemed to the crowd that gathered around them that the three young women were virtually naked beneath their figure-hugging gowns. The most beautiful of the three young women, "la belle Möina" (left in the photograph) was at once offered a contract by the director of the Moulin Rouge. The New York Times reported that, "Pictures of the young women who displayed their charming persons in so-called directoire gowns, are printed in both capitals [London and Paris] and artists and moralists, men of the world, police officers and dressmakers have been interviewed in bewildering numbers." The new style was quickly adopted by famous personalities such as the actress Lillie Langtry when she attended the races at Chester Racecourse.

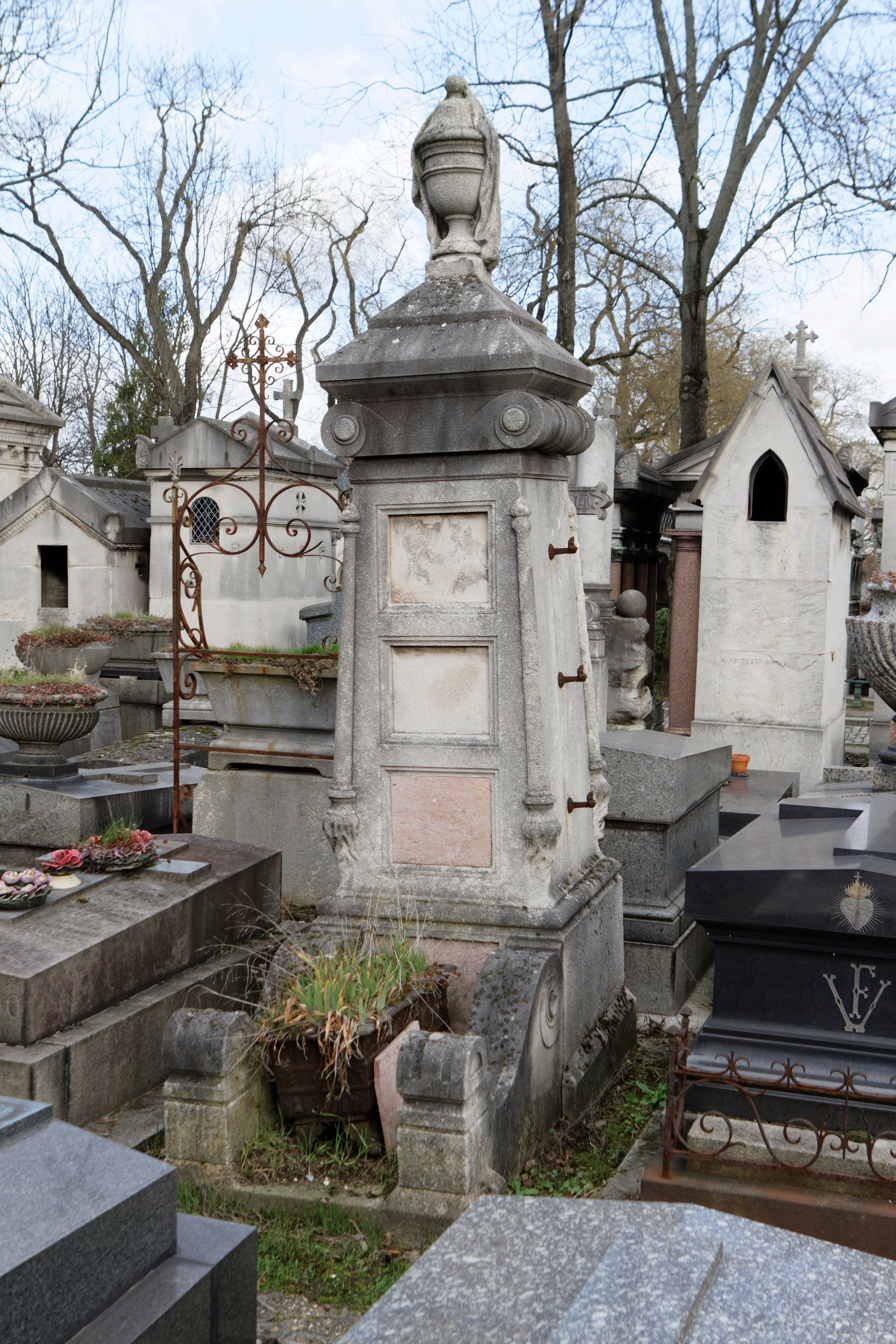
The Lacroix family grave in Père Lachaise Cemetery in Paris

Jeanne Margaine-Lacroix presented wide-legged trousers for women in 1910, some months before Paul Poiret, who took credit for being the first to introduce the style.

The 1919 silent film La Cigarette, directed by Germaine Dulac, a female French film-maker, starred Andrée Brabant dressed by Jeanne Margaine-Lacroix.

Jeanne Margaine-Lacroix died in 1930 in Chatou and was buried with her mother and husband in the Lacroix family grave in Père Lachaise Cemetery in Paris.

Margaine-Lacroix is now experiencing a resurgence of interest in the history of fashion, after having been forgotten over time in favour of the more famous Paul Poiret. Historian Caroline Evans recalls, however, that in 1910 Margaine-Lacroix produced corsets created for the Tanagra and Sylphide dresses and that its advertisements claimed that the Sylphide-fourreau corset was essential under clinging dresses thus invalidating the assertion that the dresses were worn without corset.

== Collections ==
- Dress, circa 1908-1910, Metropolitan Museum of Art, New York
- Evening dress, circa 1913, Metropolitan Museum of Art
- Dress, circa 1922, Palais Galliera, Paris
- Dress, circa 1925, Galliera Palace, Paris
- Coat, circa 1925, Palais Galliera, Paris
- Evening dress, 1927-1928, Centraal Museum, Utrecht
- Series of photographs by Jacques Bulloz, taken during the Grands Couturiers parisiens, 1910-1939 exhibition in 1965 and the Fashions of the Roaring Twenties 1919-1929 exhibition in 1970, Palais Galliera, Paris
