= The Rocks of Valpré (novel) =

1913 novel

- Author: Ethel M. Dell
- Language: English
- Genre: Drama
- Publisher: Unwin; Putnam (US)
- Publication date: 1913
- Publication place: United Kingdom
- Media type: Print

The Rocks of Valpré is a 1913 novel by the British writer Ethel M. Dell. First published in the United States in 1913. It is set in the mid-nineteenth century when an officer wrongly imprisoned on Devil's Island escapes and heads to Europe to rescue the love of his life from the villain.

== Reception ==
Contemporary reviews of the novel were mixed. The New York Times called the novel "a well constructed and closely knit tale." Other reviews noted its "sentimentality", with the Boston Transcript calling the novel a "deft old fashioned novel with much variety of interest and some effective character drawing. It comes dangerously near shipwreak on the rock of sentimentality, but never becomes quite mawkish."

It was a bestseller, including in Canada.

== Adaptations ==
The novel has twice been adapted into a film. A 1919 silent version The Rocks of Valpré was directed by Maurice Elvey. In 1935 a sound version The Rocks of Valpré was directed by Henry Edwards.
