= Lily of Killarney (1929 film) =

1929 film

- Directed by: George Ridgwell
- Written by: Dion Boucicault (play); George Ridgwell
- Starring: Cecil Landau; Barbara Gott; Edward O'Neill; Dennis Wyndham
- Production company: British International Pictures
- Distributed by: Wardour Films
- Release date: February 1929
- Running time: 6,100 feet
- Country: United Kingdom
- Languages: Silent; English intertitles

Lily of Killarney is a 1929 British silent drama film directed by George Ridgwell and starring Cecil Landau, Barbara Gott and Dennis Wyndham. The film is based on the play by Dion Boucicault, The Colleen Bawn, and is set in the Irish town of Killarney in the nineteenth century.

== Plot ==
A poor aristocrat hires a dwarf to drown his secret wife so he may marry an heiress.

== Cast ==
- Cecil Landau as Hardress Cregan
- Barbara Gott as Sheelah
- Edward O'Neill as Corrigan
- Gillian Dean as Ann Chute
- Pamela Parr as Eily O'Connor
- Wilfred Shine as Father Tom
- Henry Wilson as Danny Mann
- Dennis Wyndham as Myles-na-Coppaleen

== Bibliography ==
- Low, Rachel. The History of British Film: Volume IV, 1918–1929. Routledge, 1997.
