= Basil Gill =

British actor (1877–1955)

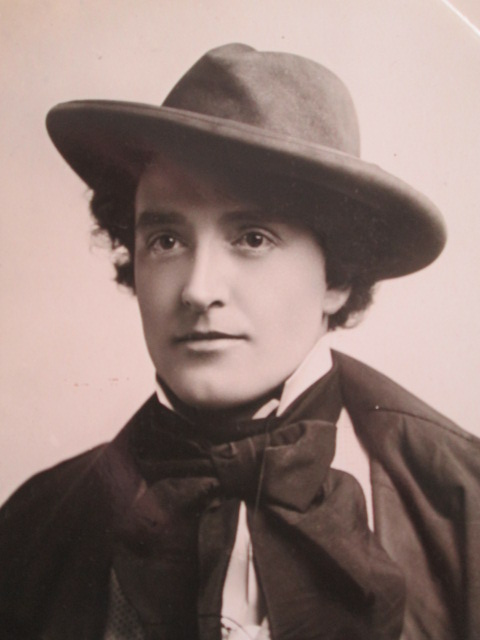
- Born: 10 March 1877; Birkenhead, Cheshire, England, UK
- Died: 23 April 1955 (aged 78); Hove, Sussex, England, UK
- Occupation(s): Stage and film actor
- Years active: 1897–1938

Basil Gill (10 March 1877 – 23 April 1955) was a British stage actor and film actor. His stage career included many roles in plays of Shakespeare.

== Life ==
He was a son of the Rev. John Gill, of Cambridge.

His first stage appearance, in Bury, Lancashire in 1897, was in The Sign of the Cross (Wilson Barrett's most successful play); the following year he appeared in this play in London. He then toured Australia and the US with The Sign of the Cross and Ben-Hur.

In 1903 he joined Herbert Beerbohm Tree's company at His Majesty's Theatre, London, and appeared in plays of Shakespeare, playing several important roles. He left the company in 1907. He continued to perform, into the 1930s, in Shakespeare's plays during his career. As well as being a Shakespearean actor, he was regarded as a matinée idol and played romantic parts in modern plays.

His career as a film actor started with Henry VIII (1911): he appeared with Beerbohm Tree, on whose version of the play the film was based. In 1926, Gill appeared in two short films made in the De Forest Phonofilm sound-on-film process, Santa Claus as the title character, and Julius Caesar as Brutus. He appeared in many more films, the last being The Citadel of 1938.

== Partial filmography ==
- Henry VIII (1911)
- On the Banks of Allan Water (1916)
- Missing the Tide (1918)
- The Admirable Crichton (1918)
- The Homemaker (1919)
- The Soul of Guilda Lois (1919)
- The Rocks of Valpre (1919)
- God's Good Man (1919)
- Julius Caesar (1926) short film of excerpt of Shakespeare's play, filmed in Phonofilm process
- Santa Claus (1926) with Gill as title character
- The School for Scandal (1930)
- Mrs. Dane's Defence (1933)
- The Divine Spark (1935)
- Immortal Gentleman (1935)
- Royal Cavalcade (1935)
- Rembrandt (1936)
- Gaol Break (1936)
- His Lordship (1936)
- The Crimson Circle (1936)
- I, Claudius (1937)
- St Martin's Lane (1938)
- Dangerous Medicine (1938) – Sir Francis
- The Citadel (1938)
