= The Hundredth Chance (novel) =

1917 novel

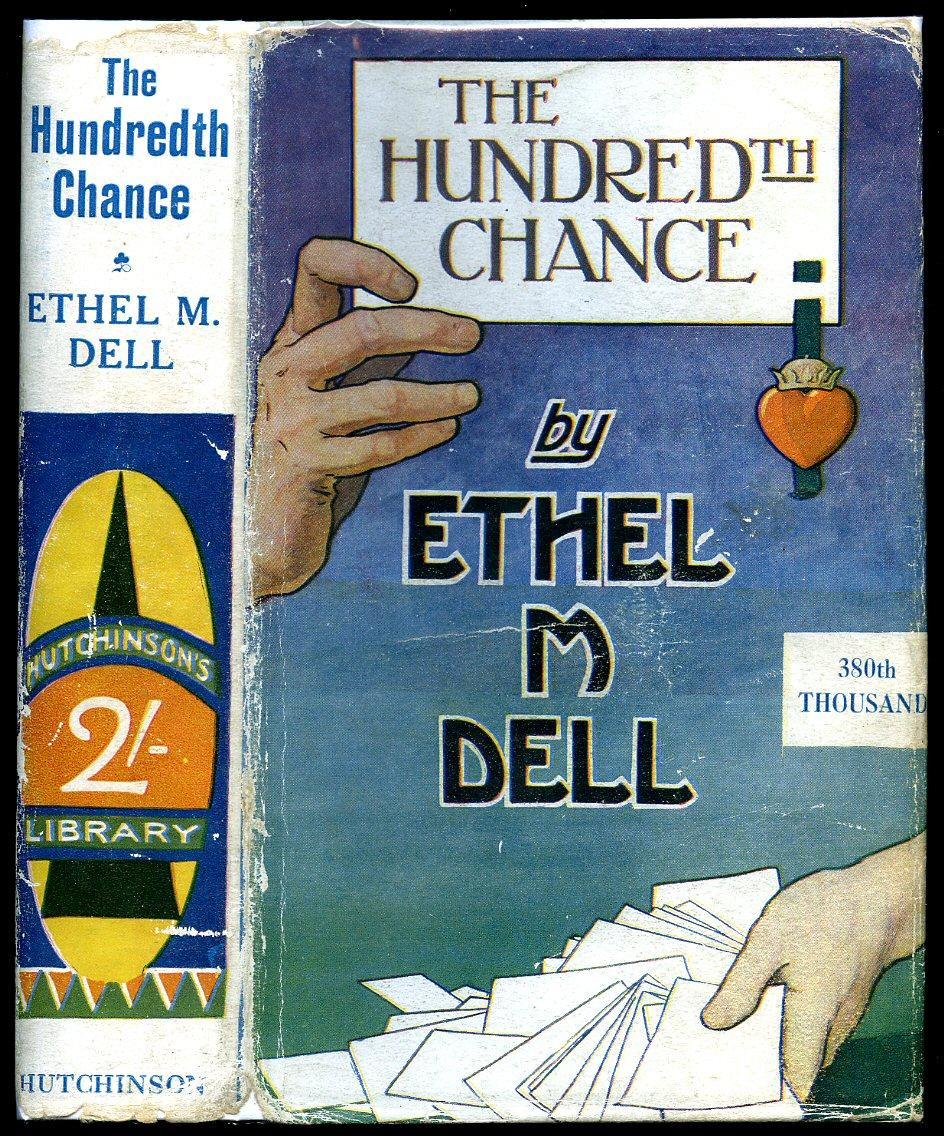
- Author: Ethel M. Dell
- Language: English
- Genre: Drama
- Publisher: Hutchinson; Putnam (US)
- Publication date: 1917
- Publication place: United Kingdom
- Media type: Print

The Hundredth Chance is a 1917 novel by the British writer Ethel M. Dell. It was one of four of Dell's novels to make the Publishers Weekly list of top ten bestselling books during the 1910s in America. In 1927 Dell adapted the novel as a play.

== Film adaptation ==
It was adapted into a 1920 silent film of the same title produced by the British studio Stoll Pictures. Directed by Maurice Elvey it starred Dennis Neilson-Terry, Mary Glynne and Eille Norwood. It was one of a number of her works to be filmed during the era.

== Bibliography ==
- Barnett, Vincent L. & Weedon, Alexis. Elinor Glyn as Novelist, Moviemaker, Glamour Icon and Businesswoman. Routledge, 2016.
- Goble, Alan. The Complete Index to Literary Sources in Film. Walter de Gruyter, 1999.
- Nicoll, Allardyce. English Drama, 1900-1930: The Beginnings of the Modern Period, Volume 2. Jones & Bartlett Learning, 2009.
- Vinson, James. Twentieth-Century Romance and Gothic Writers. Macmillan, 1982.
