= George Ridgwell =

British film director (1867–1935)

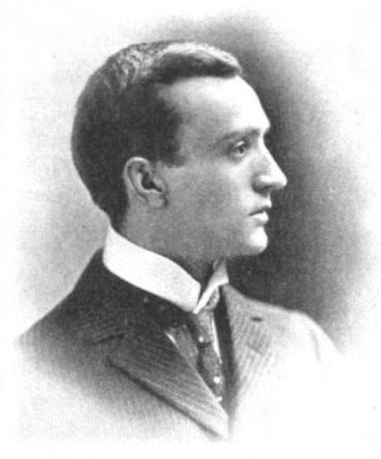
- In The Sketch, 29 November 1899
- Born: 1867; Woolwich, England
- Died: 2 April 1935 (aged 67–68); Hampstead, England
- Education: Royal Military Asylum
- Occupation(s): Screenwriter, film director, singer
- Children: Audrey Ridgewell

George Ridgwell (sometimes spelt Ridgewell; 1867–1935) was a British screenwriter and film director of the silent film era.

== Biography ==
George Ridgwell was born in Woolwich in 1867. He directed around 70 films including a series of adaptations of Sherlock Holmes stories featuring Eille Norwood as Holmes. His last film was Lily of Killarney in 1929. He was the father of the actress Audrey Ridgewell.

His early career was as an army musician (sergeant, band of the Coldstream Guards) and on the stage (he created the role of Abdallah in Sullivan's Rose of Persia and was a member of the D'Oyly Carte Touring Opera Company for a season, playing lead baritone roles). He also composed light music numbers and lyrics. He was educated at the Royal Military Asylum, later the Duke of York's Royal Military School.

He died from a heart attack in Hampstead on 2 April 1935.

== Selected filmography ==
=== Director ===
- The Mystery of Room 13 (1915)
- The Water Lily (1919)
- Fruits of Passion (1919)
- The Sword of Damocles (1920)
- Greatheart (1921)
- The Four Just Men (1921)
- The Amazing Partnership (1921)
- Petticoat Loose (1922)
- The Missioner (1922)
- The Knight Errant (1922)
- His Last Bow (1923)
- The Notorious Mrs. Carrick (1924)
- Lily of Killarney (1929)

=== Actor ===
- The Crime at Blossoms (1933)
- Channel Crossing (1933)
