= Sydney Seaward =

English actor (1884–1967)

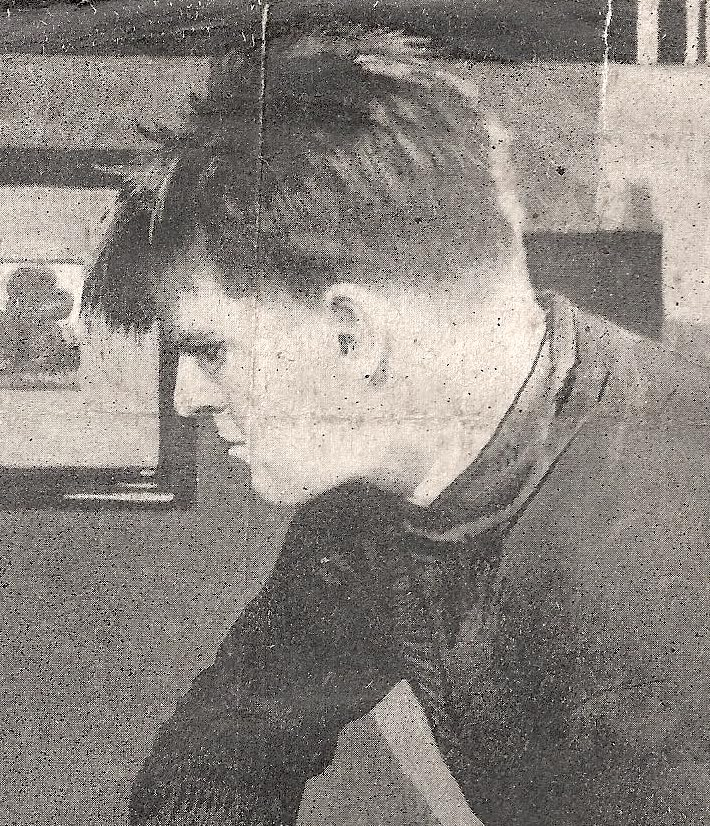
Sydney Seaward, 1920

Sydney Widmer Seaward (27 January 1884 – 22 June 1967) was an English actor born in Blindley Heath, Godstone, Surrey, England, United Kingdom and died at age 83 in Matlock, Derbyshire, England, United Kingdom. He went to Reading School in Reading and played for the 1st XV Rugby Team.

== Selected filmography ==
- Pierre of the Plains (1914)
- The Amateur Gentleman (1920)
- The Tidal Wave (1920)
- The Woman of His Dream (1921)
- The Yellow Claw (1921)
- A Gentleman of France (1921)
- The Night Hawk (1921)
- A Debt of Honour (1922)
- The Loves of Mary, Queen of Scots (1923)
- Bonnie Prince Charlie (1923)
- Trainer and Temptress (1925)
- The King's Highway (1927)
- A South Sea Bubble (1928)
- Contraband Love (1931)
- The Flaw (1933)

== Selected stage performances ==
- It Pays to Advertise, (1914-1915), Broadway
- Journey's End, (1929), Henry Miller Theatre
- Over The Page, (1932–33), Alhambra Theatre, London
