= Ethel M. Dell =

British writer (1881–1939)

Ethel May Dell Savage
- Born: Ethel May Dell; 2 August 1881; Streatham, London, England
- Died: 17 September 1939 (aged 58)
- Occupation: novelist
- Spouse: Gerald Tahourdin Savage (1922–1939)
- Writing career
- Pen name: Ethel M. Dell
- Language: English
- Period: 1911–1939
- Genre: Romance

Ethel May Dell Savage (2 August 1881 – 17 September 1939), known by her pen name, Ethel M. Dell, was a British writer of over 30 popular romance novels and several short stories from 1911 to 1939.

== Biography ==
Dell was born on 2 August 1881 to a middle class family in Streatham, a suburb of London, England. Her father was a clerk in the City of London and she had an older sister and brother. Dell began to write stories while very young and many of them were published in popular magazines. Her stories were mainly romantic in nature, set in the British Raj and other old British colonial possessions. Her stories were considered by some to be overly sexual. Her cousins were known to tally the number of times she used the words passion, tremble, pant and thrill.

Dell worked on The Way of an Eagle, her first novel, for several years, finally publishing it under T. Fisher Unwin after being rejected eight times by other publishers. The book was included in Unwin's First Novel Library, a series which highlighted a writer's first book. The Way of an Eagle was published in 1911 and had gone through thirty printings by 1915.

In 1922, Ethel married a soldier, Lieutenant-Colonel Gerald Tahourdin Savage, who resigned his commission at his marriage, making Dell the sole support of the family. Despite unfavorable reviews from critics, she developed a strong fan base, earning from £20,000 to £30,000 a year. Her husband devoted himself to her and fiercely guarded her privacy. Dell continued writing, eventually producing about thirty novels and several volumes of short stories over the course of her life.

Dell died of cancer on 17 September 1939 at age 58.

Pictures of her are very rare and she was never interviewed by the press.

== References in literature ==
The protagonist of George Orwell's novel Keep the Aspidistra Flying makes several negative comments about Dell and other authors (notably Warwick Deeping), specifically mentioning The Way of an Eagle. He also refers to her in the 1936 essay "Bookshop Memories" and in his answers to The Cost of Letters (1946), a questionnaire on the subject of earning a living by writing.

Noël Coward, in the introduction to Three Plays, writes, "There will always be a public for the Cinderella story, the same as there will always be a public for Miss Ethel M. Dell and the Girls Companion. In the world of amusement it is essential for someone to cater for the illiterate ..."

The titular character of Winifred Watson's novel Miss Pettigrew Lives for a Day refers to Dell as the source of her inspiration to encourage a young gentleman to punch a rival by hissing, "Sock him one" at the key moment.

In Richard Hughes's In Hazard, the engineer Souter aboard the steamer Archimedes has a nightmare about the late chief engineer who was lost at sea. Rather than try to sleep, he begins to read a book by Ethel M. Dell.

P. G. Wodehouse refers to Dell in several stories and in the novel Uncle Dynamite (1948). D. H. Lawrence mentions Dell in the second draft of The First Lady Chatterley (Mondadori 1954), published as John Thomas and Lady Jane in 1972.

In Cornelia Otis Skinner's popular Our Hearts Were Young and Gay (1942), the narrator says her travel-mate was well read but that she herself "had a secret letch for Ethel M. Dell."

In M. John Harrison's novel The Centauri Device, "a calf-bound set of Ethel M. Dell firsts, signed and numbered by the author" are part of the detritus of the 20th century arranged with other objets d'art at a narcotics party on 24th century Earth.

In Gladys Mitchell's The Saltmarsh Murders, the curate mentions Dell.

In Dorothy Sayers's novel The Unpleasantness at the Bellona Club, first published in 1928, Dell is mentioned as an example of escapist literature. "Servants and factory girls read about beautiful girls loved by dark, handsome men, all covered over with jewels and moving in scenes of gilded splendour. And passionate spinsters read Ethel M. Dell. And dull men in offices read detective stories."

Kenneth Halliwell and Joe Orton 'interfered' with the cover of a library copy of Storm Drift.Joe Orton Gallery This defacement is, at first glance, designed to affront "Romance" writing but the complexity of this collage and that of many other library books carried out between 1960 and April, 1962 has yet to be completely unravelled.

Ogden Nash mentions her by name in his poem, "I Always Say A Good Saint Is No Worse Than A Bad Cold."

She is mentioned as the author of The Way of an Eagle in Lissa Evans' 2018 novel Old Baggage.

== Bibliography ==
=== Single novels ===
- The Way of an Eagle (1911)
- The Knave of Diamonds (1913)
- The Rocks of Valpré (1914)
- The Bars of Iron (1916)
- The Hundredeth Chance (1917) – also as The Hundredth Chance
- The Rose of Dawn (1917)
- Greatheart (1918)
- The Lamp in the Desert (1919)
- The Desire of His Life (1920)
- The Top of the World (1920)
- The Obstacle Race (1921)
- The Knight-Errant (1922)
- Charles Rex (1922)
- Verses (1923)
- Tetherstones (1923)
- The Unknown Quantity (1924)
- A Man Under Authority (1926)
- The Black Knight (1926)
- The Gate Marked Private (1928)
- The Altar of Honour (1929)
- Storm Drift (1930)
- The Silver Bride (1932)
- The Silver Wedding (1932)
- Storm Drift (1930)
- Dona Celestis (1933)
- The Prison Wall (1933)
- The Electric Torch (1934)
- Where Three Roads Meet (1935)
- Honeyball Farm (1937)
- The Juice of the Pomegranate (1938)
- The Serpent in the Garden (1938)
- Sown Among Thorns (1939)

=== The Keeper of the Door Series ===
1. The Keeper of the Door (1915)
2. By Request (1928) – U.S. title Peggy by Request

=== Omnibus collections ===
- The Safety Curtain and Other Stories (1917) Includes:

The Safety Curtain
The Experiment
Those Who Wait
The Eleventh Hour
The Place of Honour

- The Tidal Wave and Other Stories (1920) Includes:

The Tidal Wave
The Magic Circle
The Looker-On
The Second Fiddle
The Woman of His Dreams
The Return Game
Rosa Mundi and Other Stories (1921) Includes:
Rosa Mundi
A Debt of Honor
The Deliverer
The Prey of the Dragon
The Secret Service Man
The Penalty

- The Odds and Other Stories (1922) Includes:

The Odds
Without Prejudice
Her Own Free Will
The Consolation Prize
Her Freedom
Death's Property
The Sacrifice

- The Swindler and Other Stories (1923) Includes:

The Swindler
The Swindler's Handicap
The Nonentity
Her Hero
The Example
The Friend Who Stood By
The Right Man
The Knight Errant – [1922 movie, novel's date uncertain]
A Question of Trust
Where the Heart Is

- The Passer-By and Other Stories (1925) Includes:

The Passer-By
Tommy-Rot
The Tenth Point
The Lucky Number
The Money Monster

- The House of Happiness and Other Stories (1927)
- The Live Bait and Other Stories (1932)

Additional, uncertain titles found in some lists:

- The Princess's Game (1920)
- Pullman (1930)

== Filmography ==
- The Way of an Eagle (UK, 1918)
- The Safety Curtain (1918)
- Keeper of the Door (UK, 1919)
- The Rocks of Valpre (UK, 1919)
- The Swindler (UK, 1919)
- The Hundredth Chance (UK, 1920)
- The Tidal Wave (UK, 1920)
- A Question of Trust (UK, 1920)
- Bars of Iron (UK, 1920)
- A szerelem mindent legyőz (Hungary, 1921, based on the novel The Way of an Eagle)
- Greatheart (UK, 1921)
- The Place of Honour (UK, 1921)
- The Knave of Diamonds (UK, 1921)
- The Woman of His Dream (UK, 1921)
- The Prey of the Dragon (UK, 1921)
- Lamp in the Desert (UK, 1922)
- The Knight Errant (UK, 1922)
- The Experiment (UK, 1922)
- The Eleventh Hour (UK, 1922)
- A Debt of Honour (UK, 1922)
- Her Own Free Will (1924)
- The Top of the World (1925)
- The Rocks of Valpre (UK, 1935)
- The Black Knight (UK, 1977), as part of a romance series by Thames Television along with Moths by Ouida, Three Weeks by Elinor Glyn, High Noon by Ruby M. Ayres, Emily by Jilly Cooper and House of Men by Catherine Marchant.
