= The Yellow Claw =

1915 crime novel by "Sax Rohmer"

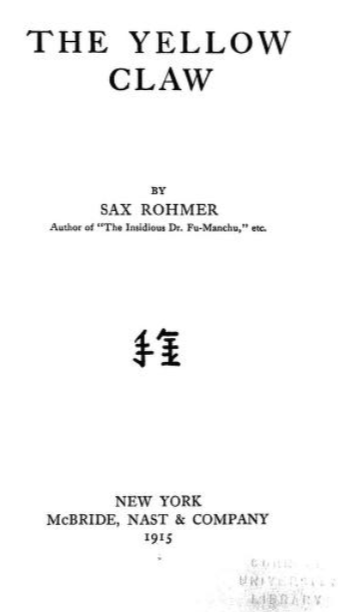
- Title page for The Yellow Claw (1915)
- Author: Sax Rohmer
- Genre: crime fiction
- Published: 1915

The Yellow Claw is a 1915 crime novel by Arthur Henry Sarsfield Ward, known better under his pseudonym of Sax Rohmer.

The story features Gaston Max, a Parisian criminal investigator and master of disguise, and his battle with Mr. King, a master criminal similar to Rohmer's earlier character Dr. Fu Manchu.

== Film adaptation ==
The novel was the basis for the 1921 British silent film The Yellow Claw.
