= The Rocks of Valpre (1919 film) =

- Directed by: Maurice Elvey
- Screenplay by: R. Byron Webber
- Based on: The Rocks of Valpré by Ethel M. Dell
- Starring: Basil Gill; Peggy Carlisle; Cowley Wright; Humberston Wright; Barry Bernard; Hugh Dabernon-Stoke; William Saville; Winifred Sadler
- Cinematography: Paul Burger
- Production company: Stoll Pictures
- Distributed by: Stoll Pictures
- Release date: June 1919
- Running time: 6 reels; 1,911 metres
- Country: Great Britain
- Language: Silent

The Rocks of Valpre is a 1919 British silent film directed by Maurice Elvey and starring Basil Gill, Peggy Carlisle and Cowley Wright. It is an adaptation of the 1913 novel The Rocks of Valpré by Ethel M. Dell.

== Cast ==
- Basil Gill as Trevor Mordaunt
- Peggy Carlisle as Christine Wyndham
- Cowley Wright as Bertrand de Montville
- Humberston Wright as Captain Rodolphe
- Barry Bernard as Noel Wyndham
- Hugh Dabernon-Stoke as Rupert Wyndham
- William Saville as Jack Forrest
- Winifred Sadler as Aunt
