= List of British films of 1923 =

A list of British films released in 1923.

== 1923 ==
Title	Director	Cast	Genre	Notes
1923
Afterglow	Walter Summers, G. B. Samuelson	Lillian Hall-Davis, James Lindsay, Minna Grey	Drama	
Always Tell Your Wife	Hugh Croise	Seymour Hicks, Gertrude McCoy, Ellaline Terriss	Comedy	Alfred Hitchcock did some uncredited directing on this short film.
The Audacious Mr. Squire	Edwin Greenwood	Jack Buchanan, Valia, Dorinea Shirley	Comedy	
Beautiful Kitty	Walter West	Violet Hopson, James Knight	Sport	
Becket	George Ridgwell	Frank R. Benson, A. V. Bramble	Historical	
The Beloved Vagabond	Fred LeRoy Granville	Carlyle Blackwell, Madge Stuart	Romance	
The Blue Lagoon	W. Bowden, Dick Cruickshanks	Molly Adair, Val Chard	Drama	
Boden's Boy	Henry Edwards	Henry Edwards, Chrissie White	Romance	
Bonnie Prince Charlie	Charles Calvert	Gladys Cooper, Ivor Novello	Historical	
Castles in the Air	Fred Paul	Lillian Hall-Davis, Nelson Keys	Drama	
Chu-Chin-Chow	Herbert Wilcox	Betty Blythe, Herbert Langley	Adventure	
Comin' Thro the Rye	Cecil Hepworth	Alma Taylor, Shayle Gardner	Romance	
A Couple of Down and Outs	Walter Summers	Edna Best, Rex Davis	Drama	
Don Quixote	Maurice Elvey	Jerrold Robertshaw, George Robey	Comedy	
The Fair Maid of Perth	Edwin Greenwood	Russell Thorndike, Lionel d'Aragon	Adventure	
Finished	George A. Cooper	Jerrold Robertshaw, Eileen Magrath	Romance	
Fires of Fate	Tom Terriss	Wanda Hawley, Nigel Barrie	Action	Co-production with the US
A Gamble with Hearts	Edwin J. Collins	Milton Rosmer, Madge Stuart	Drama	
God's Prodigal	Edward José, Bert Wynne	Gerald Ames, Flora le Breton	Crime	
Guy Fawkes	Maurice Elvey	Matheson Lang, Nina Vanna	Historical	
The Harbour Lights	Tom Terriss	Tom Moore, Isobel Elsom	Drama	
Heartstrings	Edwin Greenwood	Gertrude McCoy, Victor McLaglen	Romance	
Hornet's Nest	Walter West	Florence Turner, Fred E. Wright	Drama	
The Hotel Mouse	Fred Paul	Lillian Hall-Davis, Warwick Ward	Crime	
Hutch Stirs 'em Up	Frank Hall Crane	Charles Hutchison, Joan Barry	Action	
The Hypocrites	Charles Giblyn	Wyndham Standing, Mary Odette	Drama	
I Pagliacci	G. B. Samuelson	Adelqui Migliar, Lillian Hall-Davis	Drama	
I Will Repay	Henry Kolker	Holmes Herbert, Flora le Breton	Action	
In the Blood	Walter West	Victor McLaglen, Lilian Douglas	Adventure	
The Indian Love Lyrics	Sinclair Hill	Catherine Calvert, Owen Nares	Romance	
The Knockout	Alexander Butler	Lillian Hall-Davis, Rex Davis	Sports	
The Lady Owner	Walter West	Violet Hopson, James Knight	Sport	
Lights of London	Charles Calvert	Wanda Hawley, Nigel Barrie	Crime	
The Lion's Mouse	Oscar Apfel	Wyndham Standing, Mary Odette	Crime	
The Little Door Into the World	George Dewhurst	Lawford Davidson, Olaf Hytten	Drama	
Little Miss Nobody	Wilfred Noy	Flora le Breton, John Stuart	Comedy	
Love, Life and Laughter	George Pearson	Betty Balfour, Harry Jonas, Nancy Price	Romance/drama	
The Loves of Mary, Queen of Scots	Denison Clift	Fay Compton, Gerald Ames	Historical	
The Man Without Desire	Adrian Brunel	Ivor Novello, Nina Vanna	Fantasy drama	
Married Love	Alexander Butler	Lillian Hall-Davis, Rex Davis	Drama	
Men Who Forget	Reuben Gillmer	James Knight, Marjorie Villers	Drama	
Mist in the Valley	Cecil Hepworth	Alma Taylor, G. H. Mulcaster	Crime	
M'Lord of the White Road	Arthur Rooke	Victor McLaglen, Marjorie Hume	Adventure	
The Monkey's Paw	Manning Haynes	Moore Marriott, Marie Ault	Horror	
The Naked Man	Henry Edwards	Chrissie White, James Carew	Comedy	
One Arabian Night	Sinclair Hill	Lionelle Howard, George Robey	Comedy	
Out to Win	Denison Clift	Catherine Calvert, Clive Brook	Drama	
Paddy the Next Best Thing	Graham Cutts	Mae Marsh, Darby Foster	Comedy	
The Pipes of Pan	Cecil Hepworth	Alma Taylor, G. H. Mulcaster	Romance	
The Prodigal Son	A. E. Coleby	Stewart Rome, Henry Victor	Drama	
The Rest Cure	A. E. Coleby	George Robey, Sydney Fairbrother	Comedy	
The Reverse of the Medal	George A. Cooper	Clive Brooks, John Stuart	War	
The Right to Strike	Fred Paul	Lillian Hall-Davis, Campbell Gullan	Drama	
Rogues of the Turf	Wilfred Noy	Fred Groves, Olive Sloane	Sport	
The Romany	F. Martin Thornton	Victor McLaglen, Irene Norman	Adventure	
A Royal Divorce	Alexander Butler	Gertrude McCoy, Lillian Hall-Davis	Historical	
The Royal Oak	Maurice Elvey	Betty Compson, Henry Ainley	Historical	
St. Elmo	Rex Wilson	Shayle Gardner, Gabrielle Gilroy	Drama	
The Scandal	Arthur Rooke	Henry Victor, Edward O'Neill	Crime	
The School for Scandal	Bertram Phillips	Queenie Thomas, Frank Stanmore	Comedy	
The Shadow of the Mosque	Walter R. Hall	Lys Andersen, Stewart Rome Dora Bergner	Adventure	Co-production with Germany
Should a Doctor Tell?	Alexander Butler	Lillian Hall-Davis, Henry Vibart	Drama	
The Sign of Four	Maurice Elvey	Eille Norwood, Isobel Elsom	Mystery	
Squibs M.P.	George Pearson	Betty Balfour, Hugh E. Wright	Comedy	
Squibs' Honeymoon	George Pearson	Betty Balfour, Hugh E. Wright	Comedy	
The Starlit Garden	Guy Newall	Guy Newall, Ivy Duke	Romantic	
Strangling Threads	Cecil Hepworth	Alma Taylor, Campbell Gullan	Drama	
The Temptation of Carlton Earle	Wilfred Noy	C. Aubrey Smith, James Lindsay	Crime	
This Freedom	Denison Clift	Fay Compton, Clive Brook	Drama	
Three to One Against	George A. Cooper	Florence Wood, Judd Green	Drama	
Through Fire and Water	Thomas Bentley	Clive Brook, Flora le Breton	Adventure	
Tut-Tut and His Terrible Tomb	Bertram Phillips	Frank Stanmore, Queenie Thomas	Comedy	
The Uninvited Guest	George Dewhurst	Stewart Rome, Madge Stuart	Drama	
The Virgin Queen	J. Stuart Blackton	Diana Manners, Carlyle Blackwell	Historical	
The Wandering Jew	Maurice Elvey	Matheson Lang, Hutin Britton	Fantasy	
What Price Loving Cup?	Walter West	Violet Hopson, James Knight	Sport	
The White Shadow	Graham Cutts; Alfred Hitchcock	Betty Compson, Clive Brook	Drama	filmed quickly, after their hit, Woman to Woman (1923)
Woman to Woman	Graham Cutts, Alfred Hitchcock	Clive Brook, Betty Compson	Drama	
The Woman Who Obeyed	Sidney Morgan	Hilda Bayley, Stewart Rome	Romance	
Young Lochinvar	W. P. Kellino	Owen Nares, Gladys Jennings	Historical	

== See also ==
- 1923 in film
- 1923 in the United Kingdom
