= Julian Wylie =

British theatrical agent and producer

Julian Wylie (1 August 1878 – 6 December 1934), originally Julian Ulrich Samuelson Metzenberg, was a British theatrical agent and producer. He began as an accountant and took an interest in entertainment through his brothers, Lauri Wylie and G. B. Samuelson. About 1910, he became the business manager and agent of David Devant, an illusionist, then took on other clients, and formed a partnership with James W. Tate. By the end of his life he was known as the 'King of Pantomime'.

== Early life and background ==
Born in Southport, Lancashire, Wylie was the son of Henschel and Bertha Samuelson, tobacconists originally from Prussia. Although Wylie's parents used the name Samuelson, between 1876 and 1889 the births of their five children were registered under the name Metzenberg, with Samuelson as a middle name. In fact, the name of Samuelson was a patronymic drawn from Henschel's father, Samuel Metzenberg, of Lissa in the Prussian Grand Duchy of Posen. Henschel, born in 1829, left home in 1841 and lived with an uncle in Dublin before settling in Southport in about 1873. The surname of Wylie, later adopted by some of his children, was an anglicisation of Mrs Samuelson's name before her marriage. A daughter of Solomon Weile, she was Bertha Weile when marrying Henschel Metzenberg in Kensington in 1875. The Samuelsons are believed to have been the first Jews in Southport.

Wylie's father died in 1889, and his death was recorded in the name of Henschel Samuelson Metzenberg. In the 1891 and 1901 censuses, his widow Bertha Samuelson was still carrying on the tobacconist business in Southport.

== Career ==
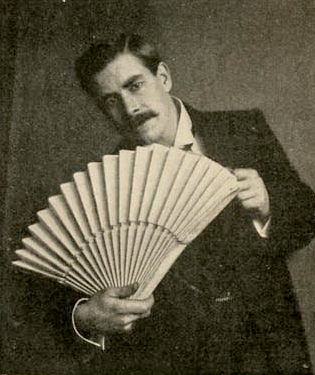
David Devant, Wylie's first artiste

Julian Wylie began his career as an accountant. His earliest contacts with the world of entertainment came through his younger brothers, Lauri Wylie, who was first active as an actor in the late 1890s, and G. B. Samuelson, who operated cinemas. About 1910, Julian Wylie became the business manager and agent of David Devant, a leading illusionist. Another story is that Wylie married a much older woman with a small son, she lent him one pound, and he established himself in London as an agent. In any event, soon after his connection with Devant he was acting as agent for other variety artistes.

In December 1911, from an office at 50 Langham Street, Wylie advertised his services in The Sporting Life as "An Ideas Agent". In March 1912, he was "Julian Wylie, the Contracts Agent", and his Ideas Department was closed until 1 July. In July 1912 he was "Julian Wylie, an Agent with an Ideas Department" and was at 18, Charing Cross Road.

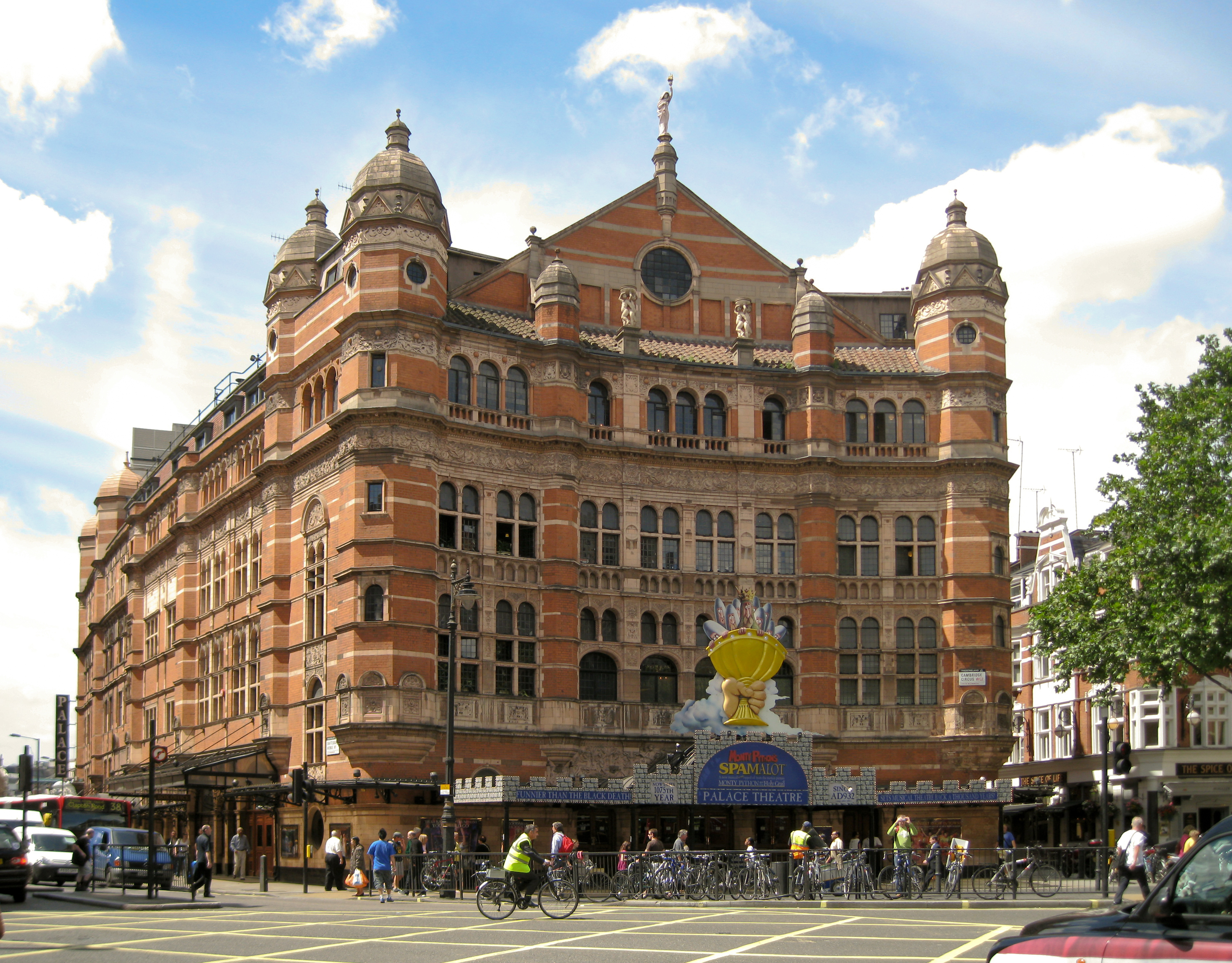
The Palace Theatre

In 1913, Wylie formed a partnership with James W. Tate, with offices at 125 Shaftesbury Avenue and later in Oxford Street. The two men were quite different: Tate mild and genial, getting on easily with everyone, Wylie suspicious and aggressive, with a deep sense of inferiority. A nervous personality, Wylie suffered from mood swings, from rage to cheerful optimism. He has been called "a large and enthusiastic north countryman", and his favourite words of approval were "Tremenjus! Tremenjus!"

Writing on Wylie, James Harding notes that "He never took to drink—he took to Ice-Cream. Buckets of it..."

The first Wylie and Tate co-production was a revue called I Should Worry, at the Palace Theatre in August 1913. By 1915 Wylie was producing plays written by his younger brother Lauri Wylie, who had developed into a writer. Wylie was an enthusiast for lighting and always planned it carefully himself.

As an agent, Wylie boasted in The Stage Year Book 1917:

"During 1916 I made Contracts for the following Artistes: Bairnsfather's "Fragments from France", Daisy Burrell, Gladys Cooper, Phyllis Dare, David Devant, Fred Duprez, Fred Edwards and May Yates, Isobel Elsom, Paul England, Bert Errol, William Fulbrook, Johnny Fuller, Hammond and Swanston, Mabel Love, Clarice Mayne and "THAT", Billy Merson, Miles Stavordale Quintet, Ruby Miller, Ernest H. Mills, Lily Morris, Owen Nares, Rebla, Ida Rene, Ritchie Troupe, Gus Sohlke, Sadrenne, Storri, Vesta Tilley, Madge Titheradge, Deane Tribune, Frank Whitman, Oswald Williams, &c. &c."

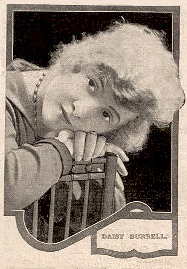
Daisy Burrell, for whom Wylie arranged film contracts

In 1920, as Julian Ulric Samuelson, Wylie joined the United Grand Lodge of England, becoming a Freemason.

After the First World War, Wylie and Tate concentrated more on pantomime, and the business flourished through the Roaring Twenties, despite the sudden death of Tate in February 1922, and on into the 1930s. Through the skill of Wylie, the Drury Lane pantomime was briefly brought back to Drury Lane in 1929. By the end of his life he had produced over a hundred pantomimes and was known as "the King of pantomime", a title also given to others later.

== Death ==
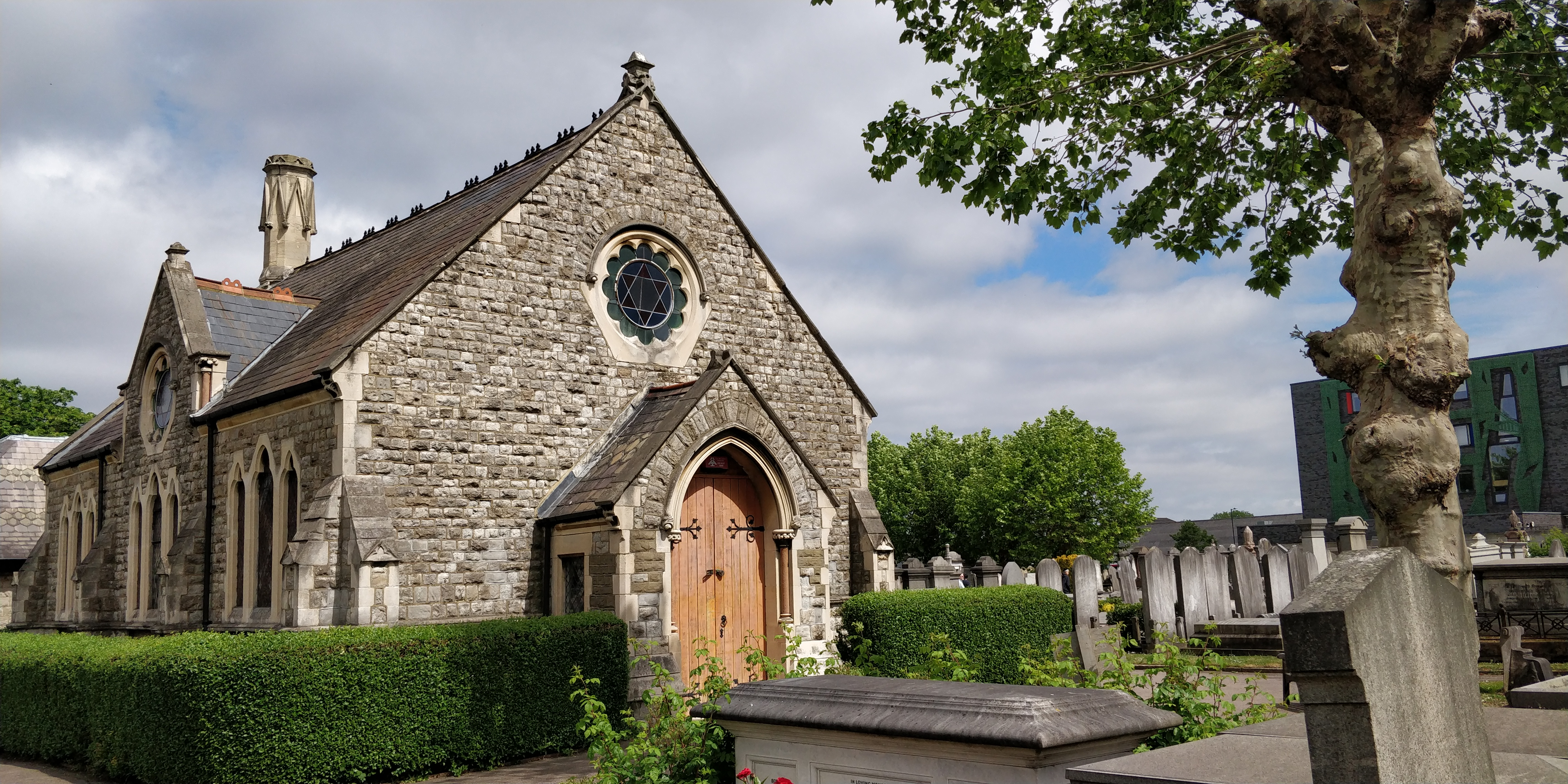
Willesden Jewish Cemetery

Wylie died suddenly on 6 December 1934 at 3:15 in the morning, aged 56. He had been in normal health the day before, and was at the Drury Lane Theatre until almost midnight. The funeral was on 9 December at the Jewish Cemetery, Willesden, and the floral wreaths included one in the shape of a goose, sent by the principals of a Mother Goose production in Glasgow. Wylie had several productions ongoing, and they were taken over by Tom Arnold.

The death was registered in Kensington in the name of Julian U. Samuelson, but on 14 December probate on the will was granted in the name of Julian Wylie to his widow, who was named as Kate Maud Wylie. His estate was valued at £9,345, and everything he had was left to Mrs Wylie, including his interest in Julian Wylie Productions Ltd.

In 1931, Wylie had staged The Good Companions on Broadway, and his death was reported in The New York Times under the heading "Julian Wylie Dies; London Producer; Prominent Figure in Theatre 20 Years Staged 'The Good Companion' Here in 1931." In its obituary, The Era noted that Wylie "had a flair for casting, and it was never more finely used than in his choice of John Gielgud, Edward Chapman, and Adele Dixon for the Companions."

== Private life and family ==
In 1918, as Julian Wylie or Samuelson, Wylie married Kate M. Connor or Skelton in Marylebone.

Apart from Lauri Wylie, another of Wylie's brothers was the early film pioneer G. B. Samuelson, who was the father of the British Film Commissioner Sydney Samuelson. The actress Emma Samms (real name Emma Wylie Samuelson) is a great-niece.
