= The Girl Who Loves a Soldier =

- Directed by: Alexander Butler
- Produced by: G.B. Samuelson
- Starring: Vesta Tilley; Sydney Folker; James Lindsay
- Production company: G.B. Samuelson Productions
- Distributed by: Moss Films
- Release date: September 1916
- Running time: 3 reels
- Country: United Kingdom
- Languages: Silent; English intertitles

The Girl Who Loves a Soldier is a 1916 British silent war film directed by Alexander Butler and starring Vesta Tilley, Sydney Folker and James Lindsay. It was made at Isleworth Studios. During the First World War a nurse disguises herself as a man and carries her wounded fiancé's important military dispatches.

== Cast ==
- Vesta Tilley as Vesta Beaumont
- Sydney Folker as Chris Barker
- James Lindsay as Lord Strathmore
- Norman Cheyne as Billy Williams / Bob Purdy
- Rutland Barrington as Mr. Beaumont
- Gordon Sackville as Judd Hampton

== Bibliography ==
- Harris, Ed. Britain's Forgotten Film Factory: The Story of Isleworth Studios. Amberley Publishing, 2013.
