= The Sorrows of Satan (1917 film) =

- Directed by: Alexander Butler
- Written by: Marie Corelli (novel); Harry Engholm
- Produced by: G.B. Samuelson
- Starring: Gladys Cooper; Owen Nares; Cecil Humphreys
- Production company: G.B. Samuelson Productions
- Distributed by: Walker Films
- Release date: January 1917
- Running time: 56 minutes
- Country: United Kingdom
- Languages: Silent; English intertitles

The Sorrows of Satan is a 1917 British silent fantasy film directed by Alexander Butler and starring Gladys Cooper, Owen Nares and Cecil Humphreys. Made at Isleworth Studios, and based on the novel of the same name, the plot involves a poverty-stricken author so depressed that he agrees to sell his soul to the Devil.

The 1895 novel by Marie Corelli depicted the Devil sympathetically, a controversial choice that spurred significant sales. In the commercially successful film adaptation, Satan appears as a handsome, wealthy prince.

== Cast ==
- Gladys Cooper as Lady Sybil Elton
- Owen Nares as Geoffrey Tempest
- Cecil Humphreys as Prince Ramirez
- Lionel d'Aragon as Earl Eaton
- Winifred Delavente as Diana Chesney
- Alice De Winton
- Minna Grey

== Bibliography ==
- Harris, Ed. Britain's Forgotten Film Factory: The Story of Isleworth Studios. Amberley Publishing, 2013.
