= A Pair of Spectacles =

- Directed by: Alexander Butler
- Written by: Sydney Grundy (play); Harry Engholm
- Produced by: G.B. Samuelson
- Starring: John Hare; Peggy Hyland; Booth Conway
- Production company: G.B. Samuelson Productions
- Distributed by: Moss Films
- Release date: 30 April 1916
- Country: United Kingdom
- Languages: Silent; English intertitles

A Pair of Spectacles is a 1916 British silent comedy film directed by Alexander Butler and starring John Hare, Peggy Hyland and Booth Conway, based on the play of the same name by Sydney Grundy. It was made at Isleworth Studios.

== Cast ==
- John Hare as Benjamin Goldfinch
- Peggy Hyland as Mrs. Goldfinch
- Booth Conway as Uncle Gregory
- James Le Fane as Ben Goldfinch

== Bibliography ==
- Harris, Ed. Britain's Forgotten Film Factory: The Story of Isleworth Studios. Amberley Publishing, 2013.
