= The Game of Life (1922 film) =

1922 film

- Directed by: G. B. Samuelson
- Written by: Lauri Wylie; G. B. Samuelson
- Produced by: G. B. Samuelson
- Starring: Isobel Elsom; Lillian Hall-Davis; Dorothy Minto
- Production company: G. B. Samuelson Productions
- Distributed by: Moss
- Release date: June 1922
- Running time: 100 minutes
- Country: United Kingdom
- Languages: Silent; English intertitles

The Game of Life is a 1922 British silent historical film directed by G. B. Samuelson and starring Isobel Elsom, Lillian Hall-Davis and Dorothy Minto. It was made at Isleworth Studios.

== Cast ==
- Isobel Elsom as Alice Fletcher
- Lillian Hall-Davis as Rose Wallingford
- Dorothy Minto as Betsy Rudd
- Campbell Gullan as Edward Travers
- Tom Reynolds as Jim Cobbles
- James Lindsay as Reggie Walker
- Allan Aynesworth as John
- Hubert Carter as Marcus Benjamin
- Wyndham Guise as Abel Fletcher
- Frederick Lewis as Richard Wallington
- C. Tilson-Chowne as Richard Travers
- Mickey Brantford as Nipper
- Mrs. Henry Lytton as Queen of Hearts

== Bibliography ==
- Low, Rachael. The History of the British Film 1918-1929. George Allen & Unwin, 1971.
