= Little Women (1917 film) =

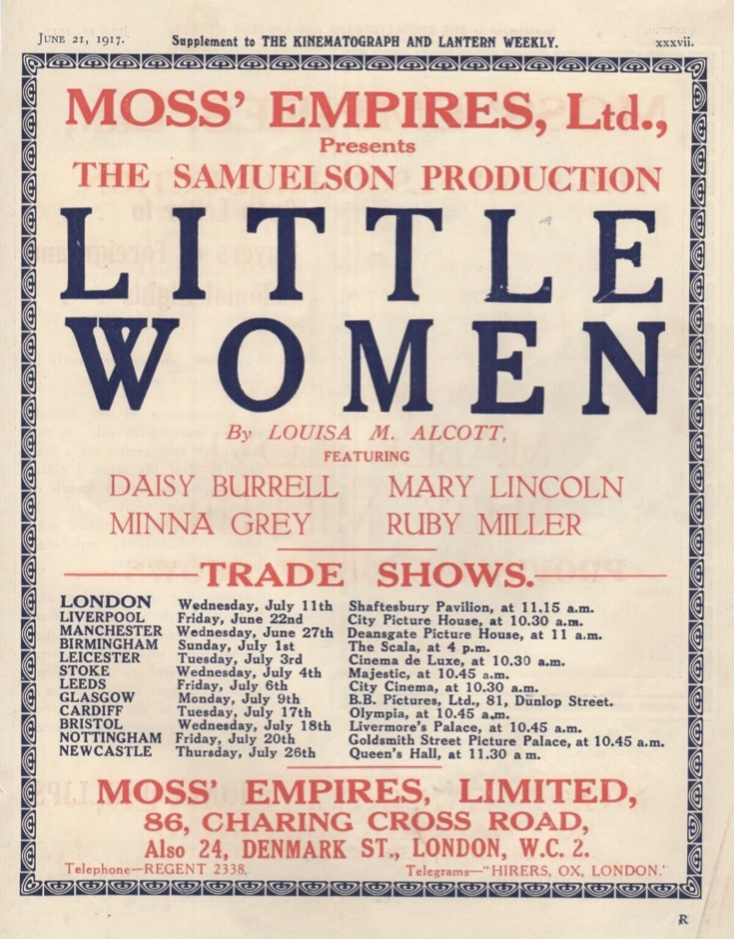
- Film poster, June 1917
- Directed by: Alexander Butler
- Screenplay by: Louisa May Alcott
- Based on: Little Women; 1868 novel by Louisa May Alcott
- Produced by: G. B. Samuelson
- Starring: Daisy Burrell; Mary Lincoln; Minna Grey; Milton Rosmer
- Production company: G. B. Samuelson Productions
- Distributed by: Moss Films
- Release date: 17 September 1917
- Running time: 5 reels
- Country: United Kingdom
- Languages: Silent; English intertitles

Little Women is a 1917 British silent historical drama film directed by Alexander Butler and starring Daisy Burrell, Mary Lincoln and Minna Grey. It was the first film adaptation of the 1868–69 two-volume American novel Little Women by Louisa May Alcott. It is now considered a lost film.

== Plot synopsis ==
The film is set during the American Civil War and tells the experiences of four sisters during the time that their minister father is working away from home.

== Cast ==
- Daisy Burrell as Amy March
- Mary Lincoln as Meg March
- Minna Grey as Marmie March
- Muriel Myers as Beth March
- Ruby Miller as Jo March
- Milton Rosmer as Theodore Laurence
- Wyndham Guise as Professor Friedrich Bhaer
- Roy Travers as John Brooke
- Lionel d'Aragon as Mr. Laurence
- Florence Nelson as Aunt March
- Bert Darley as Pastor March
- Molly Vaughan as Sally Moffatt
- Vivian Tremayne as Belle Moffatt
- Sylvia Cavalho as Anne Moffatt

== See also ==
- List of films and television shows about the American Civil War
