= A Royal Divorce =

A Royal Divorce may refer to:

- A Royal Divorce (1926 film)
- A Royal Divorce (1938 film)
- A Royal Divorce (play), by W. G. Wills
