= Daisy Burrell =

British actress (1892–1982)

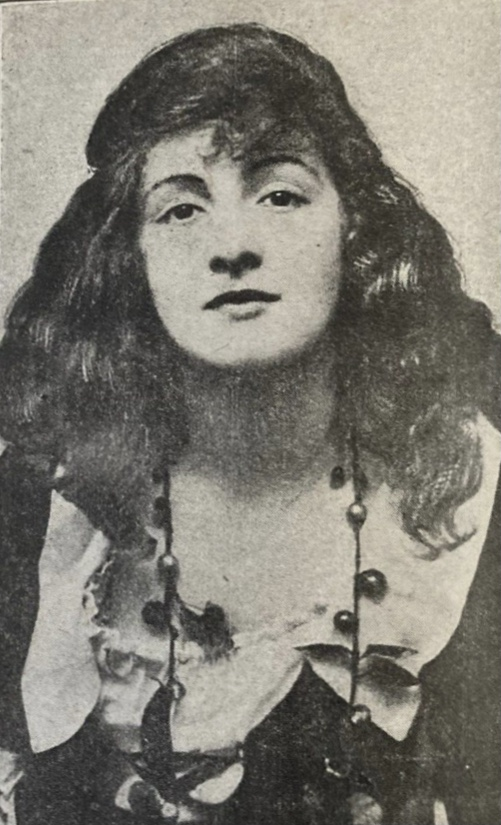
- Daisy Burrell in 1919
- Born: Daisy Isobel Eaglesfield Ratton; 16 June 1892; Wandsworth, County of London, England
- Died: 10 June 1982 (aged 89); Chelsea, London, England
- Education: Guildhall School of Music

Daisy Burrell (born Daisy Isobel Eaglesfield Ratton; 16 June 1892 – 10 June 1982) was a British stage actress and Edwardian musical comedy performer who also appeared as a leading lady in silent films and in pantomime.

In 1951 she appeared in The Golden Year, the first musical comedy produced for television.

== Background ==
Daisy Ratton was born in Wandsworth in 1892, although according to Who Was Who in the Theatre 1912–1976 she was born in Singapore in 1893.

She had a complicated family history, marred by early deaths. Her grandfather, Charles George Ratton, was a stockbroker from an Anglo-Portuguese Roman Catholic family. In 1867 he married Isabella Iphigenia de Pavia, and they lived at Stoke Newington, but he died in 1873, aged 35, leaving a young son and daughter. His widow, Daisy's grandmother, married Hassan Fareed the next year and died in 1890, aged 42. In 1891, Daisy's father, Charles Morris Ratton, married Ethel Eaglesfield Griffith, the daughter of another stockbroker, but by the end of 1892 he disappears from the records. Her grandfather, E. J. Griffith, died in 1895 as a hospital clerk at Guy’s Hospital, leaving a modest £365. His widow, Matilda Catherine Lovibond Griffith, the youngest child of Dr Edward Long MRCS, died in October 1898 at Lavender Hill.

Daisy Burrell’s mother, Ethel Ratton, was by 1898 the partner of Henry S. Burrell, licensee of the Clarence Hotel, Stoke Newington. Their son, John Griffith Burrell, was born in March 1899, and christened in August 1907; their daughter Edwina Ethel was born in September 1908. In 1900, H. S. Burrell had the Old Star in Wapping. He also had a career as a singer, using the stage name of Harry Saunders, and at the time of the 1901 census the Burrell family was in Willesden, using the name Saunders, apart from Daisy, whose name was given as Ratton. In 1911, the family was in Stoke Newington, and was again called Burrell. Later it lived mostly in Kent, at Hythe and Folkestone. H. S. Burrell was licensee of the Swan Hotel, Hythe, during the First World War. In 1939, Henry and Ethel Burrell were living at 77, Castle Road, Hythe, with their daughter Edwina. Ethel Burrell died in 1944, and Henry Burrell in 1955, leaving an estate valued at £5,166.

Charles M. Ratton had a sister, Laura Theresa Ratton, Daisy Burrell’s aunt, who lived in Worthing and died unmarried in 1944.

== Early career ==
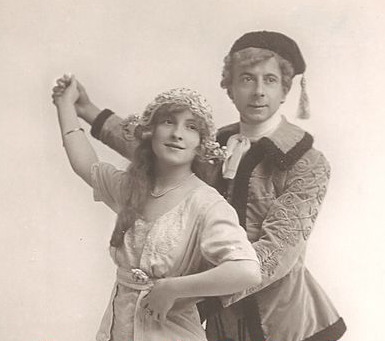
Daisy Burrell with William Spray in Franz Lehár's Gipsy Love (1913)

Taking her step-father's surname, at least as a performer, Burrell first appeared on stage at the London Hippodrome in July 1903, playing the part of Kitty in The Redskins, a water spectacular by Alicia Ramsey. She went on to study at the Guildhall School of Music, and in 1909 played the part of Youth in Give Heed, a modern morality play by Blanche G. Vulliamy, performed by students of the Guildhall School at the Court Theatre.

On leaving, Burrell went into pantomime at the Theatre Royal, Drury Lane, and in 1910 The Illustrated London News noted her appearing as Cinderella at the new Palladium. She first came to wide attention the same year, appearing at the Vaudeville Theatre in The Girl in the Train. After closing in London this production, starring Burrell in the title role, went on tour until 1911, with the Gloucestershire Echo reporting that "Miss Daisy Burrell acts and sings delightfully Gonda Van der Loo".

After that, Burrell was with George Edwardes's touring company for six years, appearing in the hit Edwardian musical comedies The Marriage Market, Peggy, The Sunshine Girl and others. In The Marriage Market, she played a midshipman. In 1912, she sang the part of Juliette in a production of Franz Lehár's operetta The Count of Luxembourg, as one of the five principals, together with Phyllis Le Grand, Eric Thorne, Lauri de Frece, and Robert Michaelis, who were collectively described by the Musical News as "all consummate artists in their own style". The next year she appeared in his Gipsy Love. The manager of the Count of Luxembourg production of 1912 was J. Garret Todd, who went on to become manager of Daly's Theatre.

Burrell played a boy, David Playne, in the original cast of Lonsdale, Unger, and Rubens's new musical Betty, which opened at the Prince's Theatre, Manchester on Christmas Eve, 1914, and transferred to Daly's Theatre in the West End on 24 April 1915. Interviewed in the Daily Sketch dated 11 May 1915, Burrell said this was the first time she had originated a part in London, and while she loved playing at Daly's, she was "tremendously envious of skirts and pretty clothes". In reviewing the play, The Tatler hailed Burrell as “a Great Girl-Boy”. A year later, Burrell was interviewed for The Era and was asked “And those boys’ parts you have made so famous?” She replied “Merci, Monsieur. I am now coming to that.“

Also in 1915, Burrell played the title role of Cinderella in the pantomime, with the Illustrated Sporting and Dramatic News commenting that “the Cinderella of Miss Daisy Burrell contributes very much, for she is a sweet and attractive little heroine... As a spectacle, her adventures are all prettiness and daintiness.”

== Marriages ==
In October 1912, under her name at birth of Daisy Ratton, Burrell married T. W. G. Carleton (1887–1957), of Stoke Newington, who was then a commercial traveller. During the First World War, he was commissioned into the Royal Horse Artillery, serving with it until April 1920. In 1919, Burrell filed a petition for the restitution of conjugal rights, and in 1920 she petitioned for a divorce. By 1924 they were divorced, and in the spring of that year at Holborn Carleton married secondly Dorothy Knight, otherwise Hunt.

In Westminster on 1 November 1924, as Daisy Carleton, Burrell married Herbert William Young, of Liverpool. Young was a Liverpool cotton merchant who retired to live in France. He died in 1943, aged 81. At the time of his death, he was of Flat 6, 14 Pall Mall, St James's, and left an estate valued at £43,838, equivalent to £1,728,213 in 2025. In his will, Young appointed his three sisters as executors and left his widow Daisy Isobel Eaglesfield Young the principal of a £9,900 marriage settlement, plus one quarter of the income from a fund of £43,000. That fund was also to go to his widow if his sisters died before her. There was a dispute over the will, and in the High Court in July 1961 Mr Justice Russell was "asked to construe the home-made will of a retired Liverpool cotton-merchant".

Burrell's first husband, Carleton, died at King's College Hospital in June 1957, also leaving a substantial estate for that time, £16,162.

== Films and later career ==
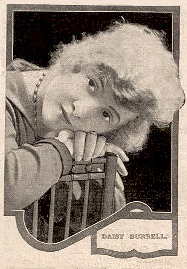
Burrell in 1919, from the cover of Pictures and Picturegoer

Burrell's start in films came from G. B. Samuelson, and she appeared in several of his early silent movies. The first of these was The Valley of Fear (1916), an early Sherlock Holmes film, in which she was the leading lady. She was offered the part after Samuelson saw her playing Cinderella at the London Palladium, in a production by his brother Julian Wylie, who was also Burrell’s agent. Wylie boasted in The Stage Year Book: "During 1916 I made Contracts for the following Artistes: Bairnsfather's "Fragments from France", Daisy Burrell, Gladys Cooper, Phyllis Dare, ... Mabel Love ... Vesta Tilley, Madge Titheradge &c. &c." Several other film roles followed. In her second film, Just a Girl (1916), Burrell played the Australian heiress Esmeralda, who spurns an English lord (played by Owen Nares) to marry a miner.

In Little Women (1917), directed by Alexander Butler, Burrell played Amy, the youngest of the four girls. In 1919, she had leading roles in The Bridal Chair, Convict 99, and The Artistic Temperament, and in May 1919 she was the cover girl for an issue of the magazine Pictures and Picturegoer. In April 1920, a theatrical gossip column in New Zealand described Burrell as "Miss Daisy Burrell, the well-known musical comedy star", while later the same year The Straits Times of Singapore called her "Daisy Burrell, the golden-haired film star". In The Last Rose of Summer (1920), "a melodramatic tale of a spinster betrayed for the sake of a valuable tea set", she again had a leading role. In December 1920 she received good reviews for her part in The Pride of the Fancy, a silent film about a champion boxer who woos her successfully, although Variety commented that "Daisy Burrell is a charming Kitty, although she is rather inclined to overact."

During her years on the silver screen, Burrell continued to appear on stage. On 23 November 1916 she took part in the first-ever performance at the new St Martin's Theatre, the first night of Fred Thompson's extravaganza Houp La!, playing Aggie, and this production ran until late February 1917. In April 1917 she opened in a revue called £150 at the Ambassadors Theatre. In September 1918 she took the leading role of Desirée in Emmerich Kálmán's operetta Soldier Boy at the Apollo Theatre, succeeding Vera Wilkinson. In July and August 1919 she played Mollie Maybud in Nobody's Boy at the Garrick Theatre.

In November 1919, Burrell wrote an article for the weekly The Picture Show, in which she gave "a few hints for cinema stars". She advised that to work in films, an actor should be able to ride a horse, swim, shoot, fake a drowning, and play billiards, cards, and the piano. She noted her own aim that "In every film, I should finish as a bride" and warned that:

"The most trying moment in your cinema experience is the day on which you first see the film with yourself in it. You think you ought to have done everything so much better..."

In 1920 Burrell returned to pantomime in the title role of Julian Wylie and James W. Tate's Cinderella at the Empire Theatre, Sheffield, continued in 1921 at the Empire, Cardiff, with Stanley Lupino. From December 1922 to March 1923 she appeared again as Cinderella for Wylie & Tate at the London Hippodrome, opposite Clarice Mayne as Prince Charming and Lupino as Buttons, this production running to 176 performances. The Times said of Burrell's Cinderella "She sings, dances and acts with equal ease."

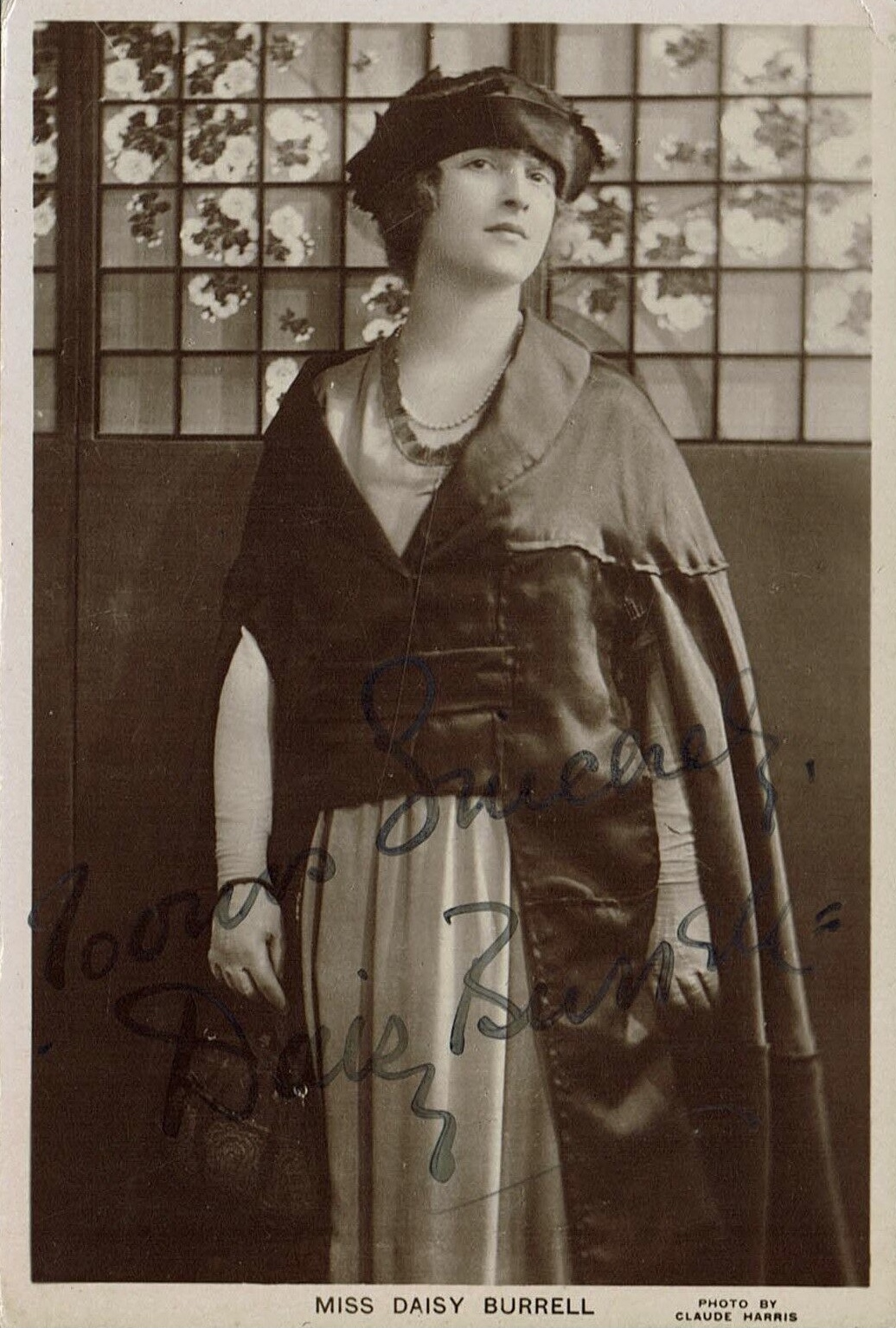
Burrell, about 1920

In October 1920 the Leeds Mercury reported that "Miss Daisy Burrell... is said to possess the tiniest feet in film-land", and in 1922 came to a report that a London theatre was offering a prize for “the lady who can wear the Cinderella slipper of Miss Daisy Burrell”. In May 1924 Burrell entered a competition promoted by the sculptor and Royal Academician F. W. Pomeroy (1856–1924), who had offered a prize "for the most perfect pair of feet". She tied with the dancer Margery Prince for the first prize of £50, and The Miami News reported that Burrell had been chosen eight times to play Cinderella on account of the daintiness of her feet. Pomeroy died on 26 May.

In July 1924 Burrell joined a touring company for George M. Cohan's musical Little Nellie Kelly, playing the lead part of Nellie. In late August, she was taken ill and Patrina Carlyon stepped into the role. By this point in her stage career she was represented by the Akerman May Agency, of 16 Green Street, London WC2. Who Was Who in the Theatre, 1912–1976 records no performances for Burrell after 1924, which was the year of her second marriage, but until February 1925 The Stage continued to carry a notice that she was disengaged. Palmer's British Film Actors' Credits, 1895–1987 identifies her with Daisy Burrell who played two minor parts in the British films Woman to Woman (1947) and Green Fingers (1947), as does the online database of the British Film Institute. She later appeared on BBC Television in The Perfect Alibi (1949) and in The Golden Year (1951), the first musical comedy produced for television, and disappeared from the performing record again after that.

== Final years ==
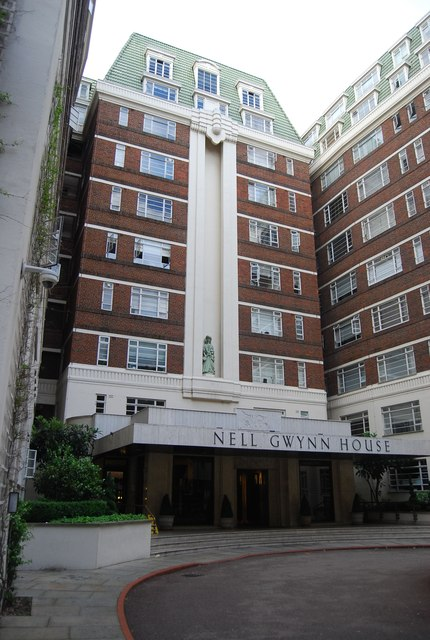
Nell Gwynn House

At the time of the High Court challenge to her second husband’s will in 1961, Burrell was living at the De Vere Court Hotel, 32 De Vere Gardens, Kensington. She ended her long life living at Flat 203, Nell Gwynn House, Sloane Avenue, London SW3. The building had a restaurant, a bar, a hairdressing salon, reception rooms, its own live music club, and other notable residents. She died on 10 June 1982, six days short of her 90th birthday, leaving an estate of £66,170.

Burrell’s half-sister, Edwina Ethel Slade, of The Keep, Kings Road, Kingston upon Thames, died in July 1987, leaving an estate of £48,795.

== Portraits ==
The National Portrait Gallery in London has fourteen portrait photographs of Burrell by Bassano, dated between 1919 and 1922. Several of these are in Cinderella costumes, and four include Clarice Mayne.

== Filmography ==
Burrell appeared in the following films:

- The Valley of Fear (1916) – Ettie Shafter
- Just a Girl (1916) – Esmeralda
- It's Always the Woman (1916) – Mrs Sterrington
- Little Women (1917) – Amy March
- The Bridal Chair (1919) – Jill Hargreaves
- Convict 99 (1919) – Geraldine Lucas
- The Artistic Temperament (1919)
- The Pride of the Fancy (1920) – Kitty Ruston
- The Last Rose of Summer (1920) – Lotus Devine
- Woman to Woman (1947) – Stage Box Committee
- Green Fingers (1947) – Stone's receptionist
- The Perfect Alibi (1949 BBC TV movie) – Mrs Fulverton-Fane
- The Golden Year (1951) – Lady Grenleigh

== Musical theatre appearances ==
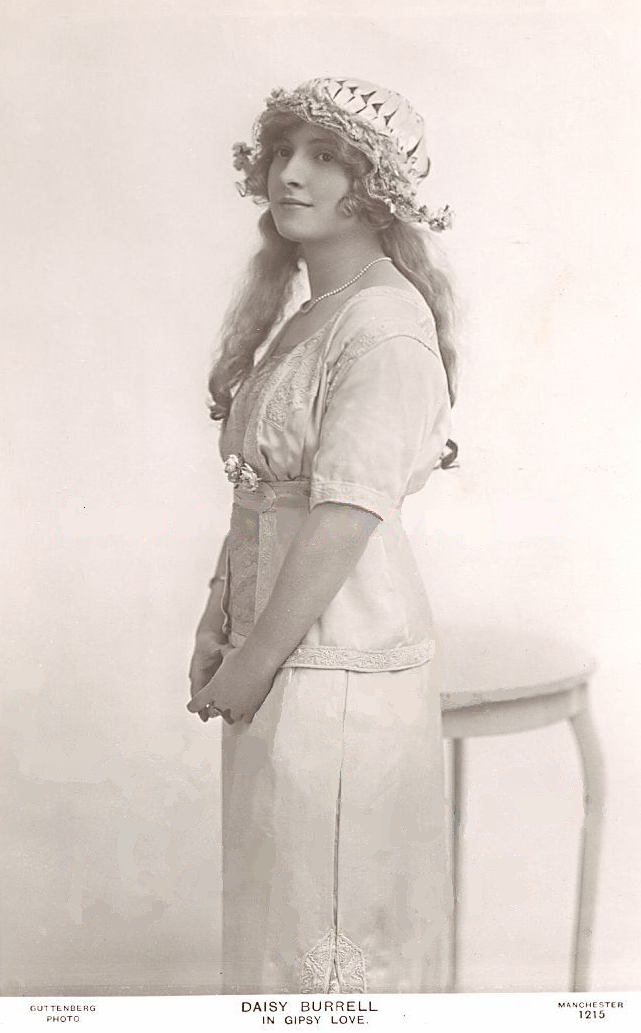
Burrell in Gipsy Love

This list is not complete

- The Redskins, by Alicia Ramsey (1903), as Kitty
- Give Heed: a Modern Morality by Blanche G. Vulliamy, Court Theatre (1909), as Youth
- Drury Lane pantomimes at the Theatre Royal, Drury Lane (1910)
- The Girl in the Train, Vaudeville Theatre and tour (1910–1911), on the tour starring as Gonda van der Loo
- Peggy, George Edwardes's touring company (1911)
- The Count of Luxembourg by Franz Lehár, Edinburgh (1912), as Juliette
- The Sunshine Girl, George Edwardes's touring company
- Gipsy Love, by Franz Lehár (touring production, 1913)
- Cinderella (1913), as Cinderella
- The Marriage Market, George Edwardes's touring company (1913), as Midshipman
- Betty, Prince's Theatre, Manchester (1914) and Daly's Theatre (1915), as David Playne
- Cinderella at the London Palladium, 1916, as Cinderella
- Houp La!, by Fred Thompson (St Martin's Theatre, November 1916 — February 1917), as Aggie
- £150 (Ambassadors Theatre, April 1917)
- Cinderella (Theatre Royal, Birmingham, Christmas 1917), as Cinderella
- Soldier Boy by Emmerich Kálmán (Apollo Theatre, September 1918), as Desirée
- Nobody's Boy (Garrick Theatre, July/August 1919), as Mollie Maybud repeated at Empire Theatre, Sheffield, at Christmas 1920
- Cinderella (1920 and 1921), as Cinderella (Wylie & Tate, Empire Theatre, Sheffield, and Empire Theatre, Cardiff)
- Cinderella (December 1922 — March 1923) as Cinderella (Wylie & Tate, London Hippodrome)
