= Convict 99 (disambiguation) =

Convict 99 is a 1938 comedy film starring Will Hay.

Convict 99 may also refer to:

- Convict 99 (1919 film), a silent film starring Daisy Burrell and Wee Georgie Wood
- Convict 99, a novel by Marie Connor
