= She (1925 film) =

1925 film

She (1925)
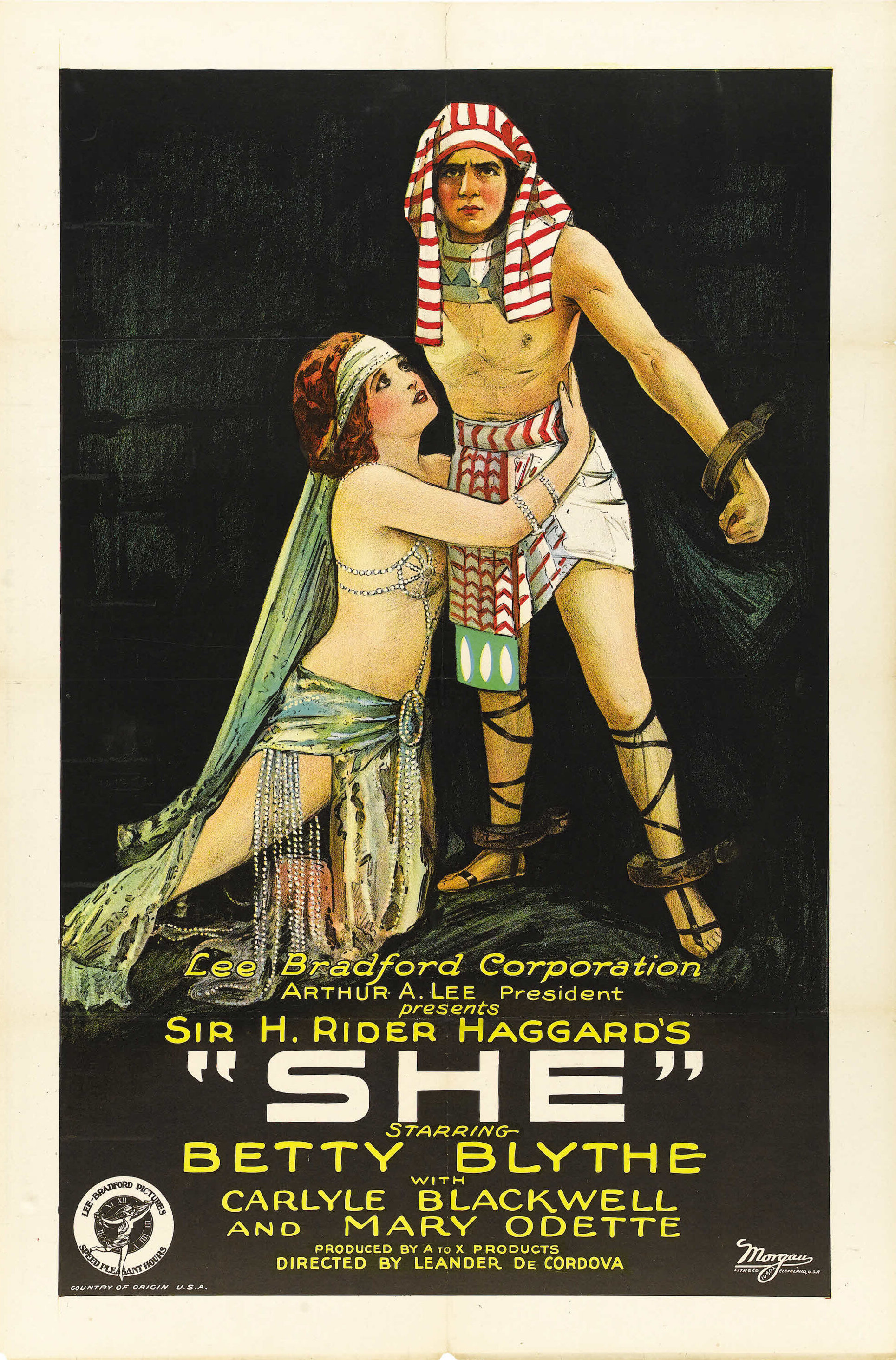
- American theatrical release poster
- Directed by: Leander de Cordova; G. B. Samuelson
- Written by: Walter Summers (scenario); H. Rider Haggard (intertitles)
- Based on: She: A History of Adventure; 1887 novel by H. Rider Haggard
- Produced by: G. B. Samuelson; Arthur A. Lee
- Starring: Betty Blythe; Carlyle Blackwell
- Cinematography: Sydney Blythe
- Music by: Louis Levy
- Distributed by: Lee-Bradford Corporation
- Release dates: 1925 (United Kingdom): 1926 (US edited version)
- Running time: 9 reels (8,250 feet)
- Countries: Germany; United Kingdom
- Language: Silent (English intertitles)

She is a 1925 British-German fantasy adventure film made by Reciprocity Films, co-directed by Leander de Cordova and G. B. Samuelson, and starring Betty Blythe, Carlyle Blackwell, and Mary Odette. It was filmed in Berlin by a British film company as a co-production, and based on H. Rider Haggard's 1887 novel of the same name. According to the opening credits, the intertitles were specially written for the film by Haggard himself; he died in 1925, the year the film was made, and never got to see the finished film. The film still exists in its complete form today.

The book has been a popular subject for filmmakers in the silent and sound eras, with at least five short silent film adaptations produced in 1908, 1911, 1916, 1917, and 1919 respectively. The 1925 version was the first feature-length adaptation, although it was trimmed from its original 95-minute running time down to 69 minutes for US release (it was only released in the US by the Lee-Bradford Corporation in 1926). (A sound version was made in 1935 by RKO Pictures, and again in 1965 by Hammer Films of England.)

The 1925 film is the most faithful of the three feature-length adaptations to date and follows the action, characters and locations of the original novel closely. Heinrich Richter handled the sumptuous set designs and impressive landscape shots. Hollywood actress Blythe traveled to Europe to appear in the film, as the producers hoped to cash in on her "vamp" appeal, placing her in a see-through negligee for the part. She later was quoted as saying "A director is the only man beside your husband who can tell you how much of your clothes to take off".

Critic Christopher Workman opined "Lead actor Carlyle Blackwell (who played a dual role in the film) was much too old for the part of the youthful Leo Vincey, and the pasty-faced makeup and ludicrous blond wig he is forced to sport only make his age more obvious....He walks through the part without showing the least bit of interest in any of it." (He later appeared in Alfred Hitchcock's The Lodger (1927) and The Hound of the Baskervilles (1929).) Alexander Butler, who plays Mahomet in the film, was actually a director who had made some earlier silent horror films, including The Sorrows of Satan (1917) and The Beetle (1919).

== Plot ==
At Cambridge University, the ape-like Horace Holly, nicknamed "Baboon", is visited by the dying Vincey who asks Holly to raise his only child Leo, and that he give Leo a chest on the latter's twenty fifth birthday. Holly agrees. It leads Leo, Horace and Job on an expedition to Ethiopia to find the lost "Pillars of Fire", said to grant immortality to whoever bathes in their light, and to be guarded by an immortal queen named Ayesha, called by her mistreated subjects "She Who Must Be Obeyed". They travel down into a lost city hidden in the underground volcanic caves of Ethiopia, where Leo learns he is the reincarnation of an ancient Egyptian king named Kallikrates. He discovers that thousands of years ago, Queen Ayesha murdered him when she discovered he was in love with a woman named Amenartes. Ayesha convinces Leo to bathe in the Pillars of Fire so that he can become an immortal like her and share her throne. However, when they enter the mystical flames, Ayesha rapidly ages and dies, not realizing that to enter the flames twice is a fatal mistake.

== Cast ==
- Betty Blythe as Ayesha
- Carlyle Blackwell as Leo Vincey / Kallikrates
- Mary Odette as Ustane
- Tom Reynolds as Job
- Heinrich George as Horace Holly
- Jerrold Robertshaw as Billali
- Alexander Butler as Mahomet
