= Milestones (1916 film) =

1916 film directed by Thomas Bentley

- Directed by: Thomas Bentley
- Written by: Harry Engholm; H. Tipton Steck
- Based on: Milestones by Arnold Bennett & Edward Knoblock
- Starring: Isobel Elsom; Owen Nares; Minna Grey
- Production company: G.B. Samuelson Productions
- Distributed by: Moss Films
- Release date: 1916
- Running time: 90 minutes
- Country: United Kingdom
- Language: Silent

Milestones is a 1916 British silent drama film directed by Thomas Bentley and starring Isobel Elsom, Owen Nares and Minna Grey. It is an adaptation of the 1912 West End play Milestones by Arnold Bennett and Edward Knoblock. Four years later an American film of the same title was released. As of August 2010, the film is listed as one of the British Film Institute's "75 Most Wanted" lost films.

== Plot ==
A young anarchist and shipbuilder refuses to listen to his conservative father.

== Cast ==
- Isobel Elsom as Lady Monkhurst
- Owen Nares as Lord Monkhurst
- Campbell Gullan as Sir John Rhead
- Minna Grey as Gertrude Rhead
- Mary Lincoln as Rose Sibley
- Hubert Harben as Sam Sibley
- Esme Hubbard as Nancy Sibley
- Cecil Morton York as Joseph Sibley
- Roy Travers as Arthur Preece
- Lionel d'Aragon as Andrew MacLean
- Herbert Daniel as Richard Sibley
- Ernest A. Graham as Ned Pym
- Winifred Delavente as The Honourable Muriel Pym
- Molly Hamley-Clifford as Mrs. Rhead

== See also ==
- List of lost films
