= The Artistic Temperament =

1919 British silent film by Fred Goodwins

- Directed by: Fred Goodwins
- Written by: Eliot Stannard
- Produced by: David Falcke
- Starring: Lewis Willoughby; Margot Kelly; Daisy Burrell; Frank Adair; Patrick Turnbull
- Production company: British Lion
- Release date: May: 1919
- Country: United Kingdom
- Language: English

The Artistic Temperament is a 1919 British silent film directed by Fred Goodwins and produced by David Falcke. It stars Lewis Willoughby, Margot Kelly, and Frank Adair, with Daisy Burrell and Patrick Turnbull.

== Premise ==
After the death of her sister, the heroine (Helen) is pursued by a rich and well-connected man-about-town. However, Helen finds happiness through playing the violin and in the arms of an impoverished artist, whom she marries.

== Cast ==
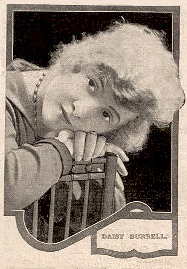
Daisy Burrell in 1919, on the cover of Pictures and Picturegoer

- Lewis Willoughby as John Trevor
- Margot Kelly as Helen Faversham
- Daisy Burrell
- Frank Adair as Edward Faversham
- Patrick Turnbull
