= For Her Father's Sake =

1921 film

- Directed by: Alexander Butler
- Written by: Alfred Sutro (play)
- Produced by: G.B. Samuelson
- Starring: Owen Nares; Isobel Elsom; James Lindsay; Wyndham Guise
- Production company: G.B. Samuelson Productions
- Distributed by: General Film Distributors
- Release date: June 1921
- Running time: 4,983 feet
- Country: United Kingdom
- Languages: Silent; English intertitles

For Her Father's Sake is a 1921 British silent drama film directed by Alexander Butler and starring Owen Nares, Isobel Elsom and James Lindsay. It was based on the play The Perfect Lover by Alfred Sutro.

== Cast ==
- Owen Nares as Walter Cardew
- Isobel Elsom as Lilian Armitage
- James Lindsay as William Tremblette
- Renee Davies as Mary Tremblette
- Tom Reynolds
- Norman Partridge as Joseph Tremblette
- Cicely Reid as Martha Tremblette
- Wyndham Guise as Mr. Armitage

== Bibliography ==
- Low, Rachael. History of the British Film, 1918-1929. George Allen & Unwin, 1971.
