= Milestones (play) =

1912 play

Scene from Act 2 in the original London production

Milestones is a 1912 play by Arnold Bennett and Edward Knoblock (then known as Knoblauch). It is a story of an upper-middle-class family's progress between 1860 and 1912.

== First productions ==
The play opened at the Royalty Theatre, London, on 5 March 1912 and ran for 612 performances. In September 1912 it opened at the Liberty Theatre, New York, where it ran for 215 performances.

== Original cast ==
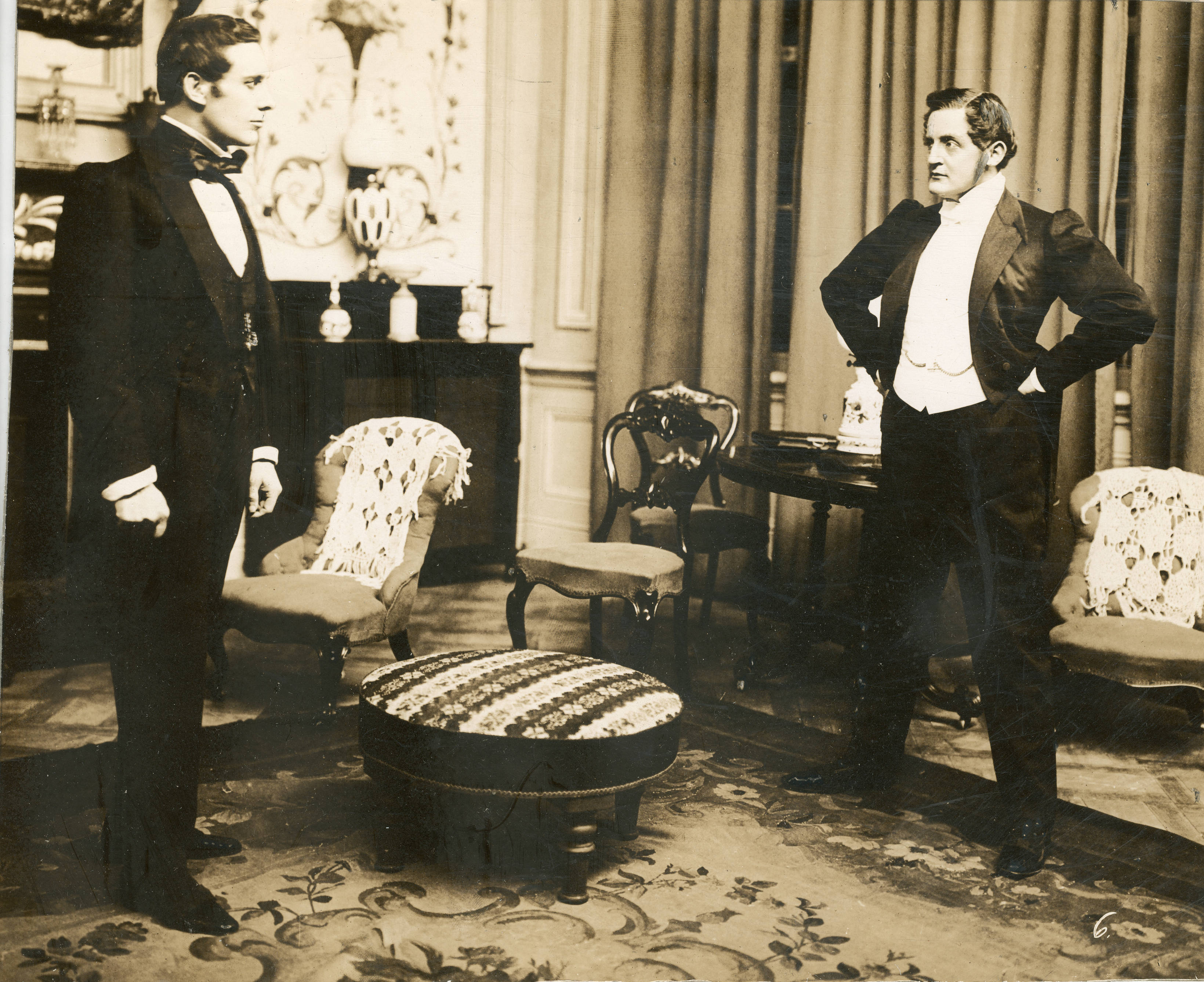
Scene from the 1912 Broadway production

- John Rhead – Dennis Eadie
- Samuel Sibley – Hubert Harben
- Ned Pym – Stanley Logan
- Arthur Preece – Lionel Atwill
- Lord Monkhurst – Owen Nares
- Richard Sibley – Reginald Malcolm
- Mrs Rhead – Mary Relph
- Gertrude Rhead – Haidee Wright
- Rose Sibley – Mary Jerrold
- Emily Rhead – Evelyn Weeden
- Nancy Sibley – Esmé Hubbard
- Muriel Pym – Gladys Cooper

The New York cast was headed by Leslie Faber as John Rhead.

== Plot ==
The play depicts the generational clashes within a prosperous English family, all concerning the matrimonial wishes of the rising generation and their parents' opposition to it. Act I is set in 1860; Act 2 in 1885; Act 3 in 1912. The following is from The Times's summary of the plot in its review of the first performance.

In 1860 John Rhead proposes marriage to Rose Sibley, and objections raised by the Sibley family. John Rhead is go-ahead and a believer in the new iron ships. What, say the Sibleys, is the matter with English oak? Dolts! cries Rhead. Faddists! retort the Sibleys. But the marriage, nevertheless, takes place. […]

In 1885 John Rhead is about to be made a baronet. His faith in iron has brought him a fortune. But his daughter Emily is now marriageable, and up comes the old difficulty. Papa wishes Emily to marry a peer; but Emily loves Arthur Preece, a young engineer. This young fellow has discovered a new process for making steel; but John Rhead, who believed in iron (at 25), does not (at 50) believe in steel. Anyhow, he bullies Emily into marrying the peer.

In 1912, Sir John [is] a doddering old grandfather; Lady Rhead, the sweetest of grandmothers; Emily, now the widowed Lady Monkhurst, and the smartest of matrons. Once more the eternal marriage question. Emily's daughter Muriel has engaged herself to young Dick Sibley, another young engineer; and Emily cannot bear it, because Dick is going to Canada, and she dreads separation from her daughter. But Muriel is quite a different sort of daughter from the daughters of the two previous generations. They were tearful, obedient, timid. She intends to have her own way as a mere matter of course. When opposed, she is quite prepared to argue it out – is, in fact, the contemporary young woman from head to foot. Fortunately she gets her way without inflicting pain on her elders after all. For Emily's old admirer, Arthur Preece (now M.P., head of the Labour Party, and already a little disillusioned with it and politics generally), reappears and claims Emily for his own. She no longer needs her daughter, who is free to marry Dick, and all ends happily with grandpapa and grandmamma having a cosy chat over the fire.

== Film adaptations ==
The play was adapted into silent films on two occasions. A 1916 British film Milestones directed by Thomas Bentley and starring Owen Nares and a 1920 American film Milestones directed by Paul Scardon and starring Lewis Stone.

== Sources ==
- Courtney, Richard. Outline History of British Drama. Littlefield, Adams, 1982.
- Gaye, Freda, ed. (1967). Who's Who in the Theatre (fourteenth ed.). London: Sir Isaac Pitman and Sons. OCLC 5997224.
- Goble, Alan. The Complete Index to Literary Sources in Film. Walter de Gruyter, 1999.
