= Damaged Goods (1919 film) =

1919 British film by Alexander Butler

- Directed by: Alexander Butler
- Written by: Eugène Brieux (play)
- Produced by: G.B. Samuelson
- Starring: Campbell Gullan; Marjorie Day; J. Fisher White; James Lindsay
- Production company: G. B. Samuelson Productions
- Distributed by: Woolf & Freedman Film Service
- Release date: December 1919
- Country: United Kingdom
- Languages: Silent; English intertitles

Damaged Goods is a 1919 British silent drama film directed by Alexander Butler and starring Campbell Gullan, Marjorie Day and J. Fisher White. It was based on the 1901 play Les Avariés by Eugène Brieux. Because of the play's controversial tackling of the subject of venereal disease, the film had issues with censor boards and attracted a degree of notoriety. The film was described by one reviewer as a "masterpiece".

== Cast ==
- Campbell Gullan as George Dupont
- Marjorie Day as Henrietta Louches
- J. Fisher White as Doctor
- James Lindsay as Rouvenal
- Joan Vivian Reese as Edith Wray
- Bassett Roe as Henry Louches
- Annie Esmond as Marie Dupont
- Winifred Dennis as The Wife

== Bibliography ==
- Bamford, Kenton. Distorted Images: British National Identity and Film in the 1920s. I.B. Tauris, 1999.
- Low, Rachael. History of the British Film, 1918-1929. George Allen & Unwin, 1971.
