= The Pride of the Fancy =

1920 film

- Directed by: Richard Garrick; Albert Ward
- Starring: Rex Davis; Daisy Burrell
- Production company: G. B. Samuelson Productions
- Release date: 1920
- Country: United Kingdom
- Language: English

The Pride of the Fancy is a British silent motion picture of 1920 directed by Richard Garrick and Albert Ward, produced by G. B. Samuelson, and starring Rex Davis, Daisy Burrell and Tom Reynolds. A drama, it was based on a novel by George Edgar published in 1914.

== Plot ==
After being demobbed from the British Army, Phil Moran is out of work and joins a troupe of athletes managed by Professor Bonkish. When Kitty, his employer's daughter, is pursued by an unwelcome rich admirer, Moran protects her, but is beaten up. Meanwhile, the unscrupulous Ireton has designs on Sir Rufus Douglas's daughter Hilda, but she loves Oswald Gordon. Moran goes on to become a boxing champion and to win the hand of Kitty.

== Cast ==
- Rex Davis – Phil Moran
- Daisy Burrell – Kitty Ruston
- Tom Reynolds – Professor Ruston
- Fred Morgan – Ireton
- Dorothy Fane – Hilda Douglas
- Wyndham Guise – Sir Rufus Douglas
- F. Pope-Stamper – Oswald Gordon
- Kid Gordon – James Croon

== Reviews ==
Variety commented that "Daisy Burrell is a charming Kitty, although she is rather inclined to overact. Rex Davis does most of the work as Moran, taking and receiving many a hard blow, but whether fighting or making love, he is an exceptionally manly and convincing hero. Tom Reynolds presents a delightful character study of the old showman. Fred Morgan adds another picture of villainy to his already crowded gallery. Pope Stamper does what is required of him as Gordon quite well, and Dorothy Fane proves herself capable of good work by a sympathetic study of the persecuted Hilda."

Kinematograph Weekly was less kind, commenting "a melodramatic sporting picture with not much detail" and "suitable for uncritical audiences".
