= Booth Conway =

British-American actor

Booth Conway (August 10, 1863 – 1939) was a British-American stage and film actor. Born in New York City, he settled in England and died in Wandsworth, Greater London, at the age of 75.

== Selected filmography ==
- The Love Trail (1915)
- The Valley of Fear (1916)
- A Pair of Spectacles (1916)
- Westward Ho! (1919)
- The Call of the Sea (1919)
- The Tavern Knight (1920)
- The Little Welsh Girl (1920)
- Married to a Mormon (1922)
- Nell Gwyn (1926)
