= I Pagliacci (1923 film) =

1923 film

- Directed by: G. B. Samuelson; S. W. Smith
- Written by: Ruggero Leoncavallo (opera); Walter Summers
- Produced by: G. B. Samuelson
- Starring: Adelqui Migliar; Lillian Hall-Davis; Campbell Gullan
- Production company: Napoleon Films
- Distributed by: Napoleon Films
- Release date: August 1923
- Country: United Kingdom
- Languages: Silent; English intertitles

I Pagliacci is a 1923 British silent historical drama film directed by G. B. Samuelson and S. W. Smith and starring Adelqui Migliar, Lillian Hall-Davis and Campbell Gullan. The film was shot at Isleworth Studios. It is based on the 1892 opera Pagliacci by Ruggero Leoncavallo.

== Cast ==
- Adelqui Migliar as Canio, the Clown
- Lillian Hall-Davis as Nedda
- Campbell Gullan as Tonio
- Frank Dane as Silvio
- Alexander Butler
- G. Longoborde

== See also ==
- List of early color feature films

== Bibliography ==
- Goble, Alan. The Complete Index to Literary Sources in Film. Walter de Gruyter, 1999.
