= The Fourth Wall (Milne play) =

The Fourth Wall is a mystery play by the British writer A.A. Milne. It was first staged at the Haymarket Theatre in 1928. Under the name, The Perfect Alibi, it was produced at the Charles Hopkins Theatre on Broadway from November 1928 through July 1929.

== Adaptations ==
In 1930 the play was adapted for the film Birds of Prey directed by Basil Dean.

In 1949 it was adapted by BBC television as a ninety-minute drama called The Perfect Alibi and was first broadcast on 6 August 1949. The cast included Edward Lexy as Major Fothergill, Daisy Burrell as Mrs Fulverton-Fane, Ian Fleming as Arthur Ludgrove, and Arthur Young as Edward Carter. In 1958 it was adapted by BBC television as a sixty-minute drama and was first broadcast as part of the series Saturday Playhouse on 2 August 1958. It was produced and directed by Adrian Brown and starred George Benson (actor) as Edward Carter, Elvi Hale as Susan Cunningham, Maria Charles as Jane West, and Maurice Colbourne as Arthur Ludgrove.

== Bibliography ==
- Kershaw, Baz. The Cambridge History of British Theatre: Volume 3. Cambridge University Press, 2004.
