= Tom Reynolds (actor) =

British actor (1866–1942)

Tom Reynolds (9 August 1866 in London, England – 25 July 1942) was a British actor.

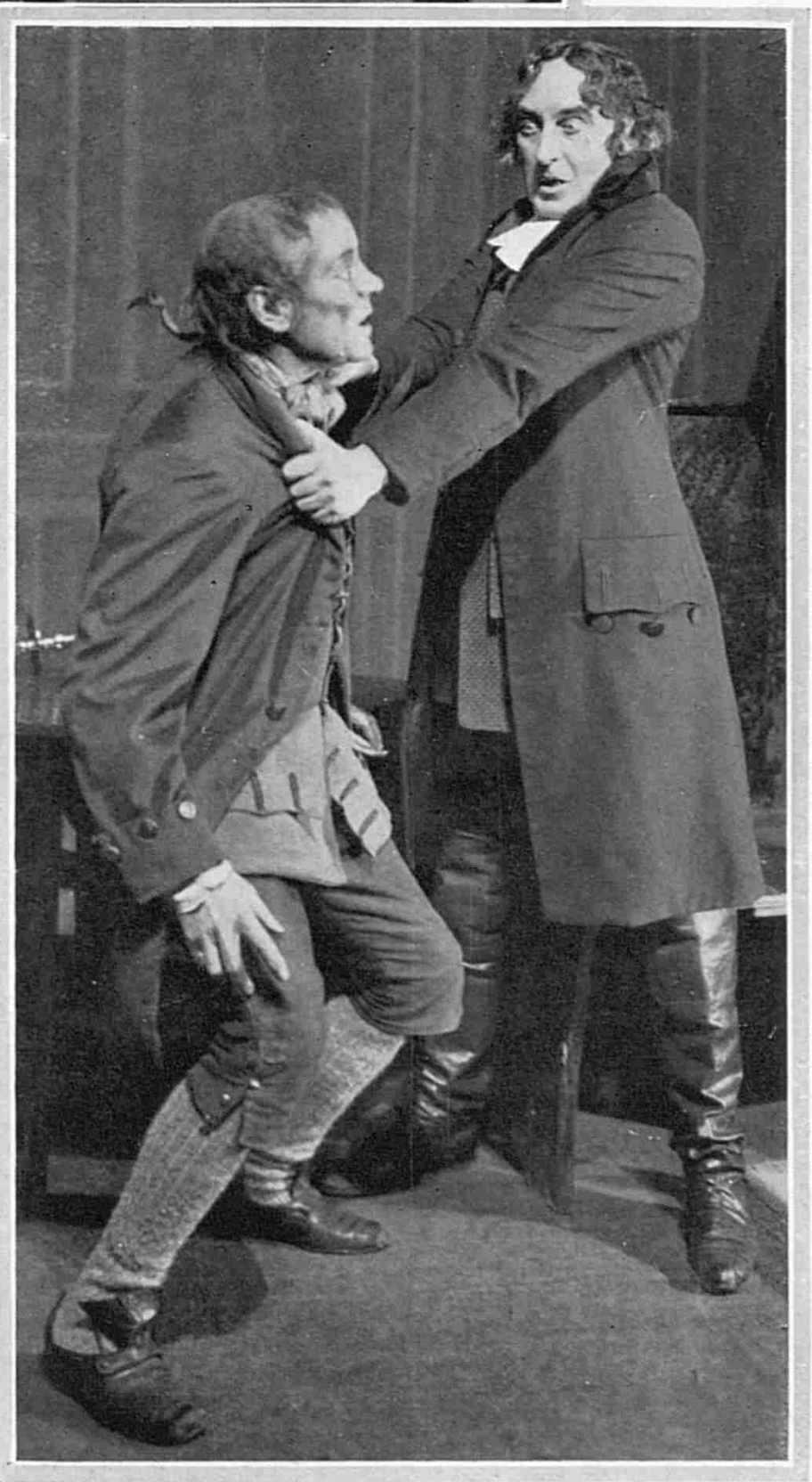
Tom Reynolds (left) opposite Russell Thorndike in the 1927 production of Doctor Syn.

== Selected filmography ==
- The Lyons Mail (1916)
- Onward Christian Soldiers (1918)
- A Member of Tattersall's (1919)
- The Right Element (1919)
- Mrs. Thompson (1919)
- The Winning Goal (1920)
- Aunt Rachel (1920)
- The Husband Hunter (1920)
- The Pride of the Fancy (1920) - Professor Ruston
- The Last Rose of Summer (1920) - Palliser
- Tilly of Bloomsbury (1921)
- The Magistrate (1921)
- For Her Father's Sake (1921)
- Mr. Pim Passes By (1921)
- The Game of Life (1922)
- A Bachelor's Baby (1922)
- The Knockout (1923)
- A Royal Divorce (1923)
- The Cost of Beauty (1924)
- She (1925)
- Birds of Prey (1930)

== Death ==
Tom Reynolds died on 25 July 1942, aged 75
