= The Valley of Fear (film) =

- Directed by: Alexander Butler
- Written by: Harry Engholm
- Based on: The Valley of Fear by Arthur Conan Doyle
- Produced by: G. B. Samuelson
- Starring: Harry Arthur Saintsbury; Daisy Burrell; Booth Conway; Arthur M. Cullin
- Production company: G.B. Samuelson Productions
- Distributed by: Moss Pictures
- Release date: May 1916
- Country: United Kingdom
- Language: English

The Valley of Fear is a British silent adventure film of 1916 directed by Alexander Butler and starring Harry Arthur Saintsbury, Daisy Burrell and Booth Conway. The film is an adaptation of the 1915 novel, The Valley of Fear by Arthur Conan Doyle featuring Sherlock Holmes. This is now considered a lost film.

== Production ==
After the success of A Study in Scarlet in 1914, producer G. B. Samuelson decided to make another feature-length adaptation of Sherlock Holmes. French company Eclair owned the cinematic rights to Conan Doyle's stories up to 1912 which left only one full length story available, The Valley of Fear

While James Bragington was considered a virtual doppelgänger of Sherlock Holmes in A Study in Scarlet, the role in The Valley of Fear required more from an actor so H.A. Saintsbury was cast instead. Saintsbury had played the role onstage more than any other actor, over 1,000 times in both William Gillette's Sherlock Holmes as well as Conan Doyle's The Speckled Band. Arthur Cullin was cast as Watson, a role he would repeat seven years later in 1923's The Sign of the Four opposite Eille Norwood as Holmes.

== Cast ==
- Harry Arthur Saintsbury as Sherlock Holmes
- Daisy Burrell as Ettie Shafter
- Booth Conway as Professor Moriarty
- Jack McCauley as McGinty
- Cecil Mannering as John McMurdo
- Arthur M. Cullin as Dr. Watson
- Lionel d'Aragon as Captain Marvin
- Bernard Vaughan as Shafter
- Jack Clare as Ted Baldwin

== See also ==
- List of lost films
