= Wyndham Guise =

British actor (1859–1934)

- Born: William Windham Guise Cutler; 20 November 1859; Holborn, London, England, UK
- Died: 1934 (age 74 – 75); Mildenhall, Suffolk, England, UK
- Occupation: Actor

Wyndham Guise (né William Windham Guise Cutler) was a British actor who appeared on stage in Edwardian musical comedies beginning in the 1890s and became a film actor during the silent era. He is sometimes credited as Windham Guise.

== Selected filmography ==
- The House of Temperley (1913)
- The Bosun's Mate (1914)
- Trilby (1914)
- She Stoops to Conquer (1914)
- The Firm of Girdlestone (1915)
- Sally in Our Alley (1916)
- Dr. Wake's Patient (1916)
- The Lyons Mail (1916)
- Diana and Destiny (1916)
- Tom Jones (1917)
- Little Women (1917)
- A Turf Conspiracy (1918)
- A Fortune at Stake (1918)
- Democracy (1918)
- Mrs. Thompson (1919)
- Convict 99 (1919) – Mr Lucas
- The Pride of the Fancy (1920) – Sir Rufus Douglas
- The Pursuit of Pamela (1920)
- General John Regan (1921)
- The Princess of New York (1921)
- For Her Father's Sake (1921)
- Mr. Pim Passes By (1921)
- The Game of Life (1922)
- Her Redemption (1924)
- The Qualified Adventurer (1925)
- When Giants Fought (1926)
- Thou Fool (1926)
- Carry On (1927)
- His House in Order (1928)
- Cupid in Clover (1929)
