= Harry Engholm =

British screenwriter

Harry Engholm was a British screenwriter.

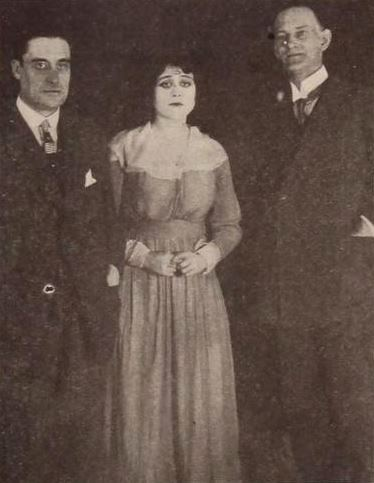
Ernest Reed, Theda Bara and Harry Engholm (1917)

== Selected filmography ==
- East Lynne (1913)
- Sixty Years a Queen (1913)
- Lights of London (1914)
- A Study in Scarlet (1914)
- A Cinema Girl's Romance (1915)
- Dr. Wake's Patient (1916)
- The Valley of Fear (1916)
- Just a Girl (1916)
- A Fair Impostor (1916)
- Milestones (1916)
- A Pair of Spectacles (1916)
- The Sorrows of Satan (1917)
- The Duchess of Seven Dials (1920)
- The Croxley Master (1921)
- If Youth But Knew (1926)
- Every Mother's Son (1926)
- The Battles of Coronel and Falkland Islands (1927)
