= The Ugly Duckling (1920 film) =

1920 film

- Directed by: Alexander Butler
- Produced by: G.B. Samuelson
- Starring: Albert Ray; Florence Turner; Maudie Dunham; William Merrick
- Production company: G.B. Samuelson Productions
- Distributed by: General Film Distributors
- Release date: July 1920
- Running time: 6,000 feet
- Country: United Kingdom
- Languages: Silent; English intertitles

The Ugly Duckling is a 1920 British silent comedy film directed by Alexander Butler and starring Albert Ray, Florence Turner and Maudie Dunham. It was one of several films made by the British producer G.B. Samuelson at Universal City, California.

== Cast ==
- Albert Ray as Owen Wilshire
- Florence Turner as Charmis Graham
- Maudie Dunham as Sally Lee
- William Merrick as John Wilshire

== Bibliography ==
- Low, Rachael. History of the British Film, 1918-1929. George Allen & Unwin, 1971.
