= A Study in Scarlet (1914 British film) =

1914 film

- James Bragington as Sherlock Holmes
- Directed by: George Pearson
- Written by: Arthur Conan Doyle (novel); Harry Engholm
- Produced by: George Pearson; G. B. Samuelson
- Starring: James Bragington
- Cinematography: Walter Buckstone
- Release date: 28 December 1914
- Running time: 6 reels
- Country: United Kingdom
- Language: Silent with English intertitles

A Study in Scarlet is a 1914 British silent drama film directed by George Pearson and starring James Bragington, making him the first English actor to portray Holmes on film. It is based on the Sir Arthur Conan Doyle 1887 novel of the same name and is considered to be lost. An American film of the same name was released in the U.S. on the following day, 29 December 1914. As of 2014, the film is missing from the BFI National Archive, and is listed as one of the British Film Institute's "75 Most Wanted" lost films.

== Production ==
Ward Lock & Co, original publishers of A Study in Scarlet in the November 1887 edition of Beeton's Christmas Annual, had the comprehensive rights to the book. The company sold the film rights to G. B. Samuelson and his film company.

Samuelson's plans for the film were ambitious with outdoor scenes filmed at Cheddar Gorge in Cheddar, Somerset, England doubling for Utah in the United States.

James Bragington was an employee of Samuelson's company and was cast purely due to his resemblance to Sidney Paget's famous illustrations of Holmes. Author Alan Barnes theorizes that Bragington may have been the first actor to wear a deerstalker on screen.

The success of the film led Samuelson to make another Sherlock Holmes film two years later, The Valley of Fear.

== Cast ==
- James Bragington as Sherlock Holmes
- Fred Paul as Jefferson Hope
- Agnes Glynne as Lucy Ferrier
- Henry Paulo as John Ferrier
- James Le Fre as Father
- Winifred Pearson as Lucy, A Child
- Unknown actor as Dr. Watson

== See also ==
- List of lost films
