= The Bridal Chair =

1919 British film by G. B. Samuelson

- Written by: G. B. Samuelson; Roland Pertwee
- Produced by: G. B. Samuelson
- Starring: Miriam J. Sabbage; C. M. Hallard; Daisy Burrell; Mary Rorke
- Production company: G. B. Samuelson Productions
- Release date: 1919
- Country: United Kingdom
- Languages: Silent; English intertitles

The Bridal Chair is a British silent motion picture of 1919 directed by G. B. Samuelson and starring Miriam J. Sabbage, C. M. Hallard, Daisy Burrell and Mary Rorke. A drama, it was written by Samuelson and Roland Pertwee.

The film was premiered at a Trade Show in July 1919.

== Plot ==
Sylvane Sheridan is a cripple in a wheelchair, engaged to Lord Louis Lewis, a faithful middle-aged man who resists the temptation to abandon her for other young ladies, such as Jill Hargreaves. He has vowed not to marry anyone else while Sylvane survives.

== Cast ==
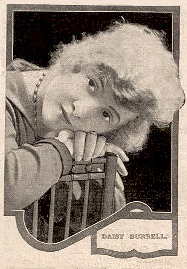
Daisy Burrell in 1919, on the cover of Pictures and Picturegoer

- Miriam J. Sabbage – Sylvane Sheridan
- C. M. Hallard – Lord Louis Lewis
- Daisy Burrell – Jill Hargreaves
- Mary Rorke – Mrs Sheridan
- John Kelt – Butler
