= Just a Girl (film) =

- Directed by: Alexander Butler
- Written by: Charles Garvice (novel); Harry Engholm
- Starring: Owen Nares; Daisy Burrell; Paul England
- Production company: G.B. Samuelson Productions
- Release date: 1916
- Country: United Kingdom
- Language: English

Just a Girl is a British silent motion picture of 1916 directed by Alexander Butler and starring Owen Nares, Daisy Burrell and Paul England. A romance, it was adapted by Harry Engholm from Charles Garvice's novel of the same title published in 1895.

== Plot ==
Esmeralda, an Australian heiress played by Daisy Burrell, is courted by Lord Trafford (Owen Nares), an English peer in need of money. However, she refuses him and marries the man she loves, Norman Druce, a humble miner.

== Cast ==
- Owen Nares – Lord Trafford
- Daisy Burrell – Esmeralda
- J. Hastings Batson – Duke
- Minna Grey – Duchess
- Paul England – Norman Druce (the miner)

== Production ==
Burrell later noted that a location scene in which she had to fire a revolver while riding a pony had been filmed at Cheddar Gorge. The pony proved to be a bucking bronco and had bolted, with her clinging on grimly. Due to this excitement, filming had been abandoned for the rest of the morning.

The film was distributed in Sweden under the title Australiens vilda ros ('Australia's Wild Rose') and subtitled Esmeralda, lägrets stolthet ('Esmeralda, Pride of the Camp'). The Swedish premiere was at the Odeon, Stockholm, on 3 October 1917.
