= The Last Rose of Summer (1920 film) =

1920 film

- Directed by: Albert Ward
- Written by: Roland Pertwee; Hugh Conway (novel)
- Produced by: G. B. Samuelson
- Starring: Owen Nares; Daisy Burrell
- Release date: 1920
- Country: United Kingdom
- Language: English

The Last Rose of Summer is a British silent motion picture of 1920 directed by Albert Ward, produced by G. B. Samuelson, and starring Owen Nares and Daisy Burrell. A drama, it was written by Roland Pertwee, based on a novel by Hugh Conway.

== Plot ==
In The Last Rose of Summer Oliver Selwyn is a collector who woos Lotus Devine, but not for herself alone. The movie has been called "a melodramatic tale of a spinster betrayed for the sake of a valuable teaset". Denis Gifford says "Collector feigns love for spinster to obtain her father’s tea service."

== Cast ==
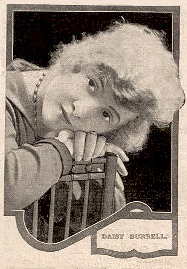
Daisy Burrell in 1919, on the cover of Pictures and Picturegoer

- Daisy Burrell as Lotus Devine
- Owen Nares as Oliver Selwyn
- Minna Grey as Amy Palliser
- Tom Reynolds as Palliser
- Richard Barry as Alf Purvis
- John Phelps as Percy Melville
