= Nobody's Boy (musical) =

Nobody's Boy is a musical theatre production of 1919, produced in London's West End.

== Writers and productions ==
The libretto by John P. Wilson is based on The Foundling by William Lestocq and E. M. Robson. Music is by Edward A. Horan, who was a 21-year-old American.

The first production ran at the Garrick Theatre from 9 July to 2 August 1919, with William J. Wilson as director, Jack Haskell as choreographer, and Arthur E. Godfrey as musical director. It had a run at the Garrick of only 32 performances, so was deemed to have flopped.

A further production was staged at the Empire Theatre, Sheffield, at Christmas 1920, with Daisy Burrell reprising the role of Mollie Maybud.

== Plot ==
The young Dr Randall and his bride were on their honeymoon in Brighton in 1894 when they found a baby boy abandoned on their bed, so adopted him and brought him up. Twenty-five years on, Dick Randall is engaged to Rose Bunting, but her parents, Colonel and Mrs Bunting, have been told the story of his origins and insist Dick must find at least one parent, or the wedding is off. Dick has a series of adventures in his search: he believes Mollie Maybud, a cabaret singer, is his sister, but she turns out to be a girlfriend of Colonel Bunting. Dick saves Alice Hawkins from marrying Bradbury Bitters, as she is in love with Jack Foster; he then believes Alice's aunt, another Mrs Bunting, is his mother, as she had lost a “little one” in the same hotel, but this turns out to have been a pet monkey. Finally, Dr Randall produces a document which the Bunting family accept as giving Dick a respectable background.

== Originating cast ==
- Donald Calthrop as Dick Randall
- Marjorie Gordon as Rose Bunting
- Jack Sinclair as Bridegroom
- Clifton Alderson as Dr Randall
- Johnny Dale as Reggie Fairfax
- Frank Lalor as Colonel Bunting
- Daisy Burrell as Mollie Maybud
- Amy Augarde as Mrs Bunting
- Doris Chard as Alice Hawkins
- Eddie Morris as Bradbury Bitters
- Fred Hearne as Jack Foster
- Kitty Lister as "Mother's Boy"
