= The Life of Shakespeare =

1914 film by J.B. McDowell and Frank R. Growcott

The Life of Shakespeare is a 1914 British silent biographical film directed by Frank R. Growcott and J.B. McDowell and starring Albert Ward, Sybil Hare and George Foley. It follows the life of the English playwright William Shakespeare.

== Cast ==
- Albert Ward - William Shakespeare
- Sybil Hare - Anne Hathaway
- George Foley - Sir Thomas Lucy
- Aimee Martinek - Queen Elizabeth
- M. Gray Murray - Sir Hugh Clopton
- Eva Bayley - Mrs Shakespeare
- Miss Bennett - Charlotte Clopton
