= Paul England (actor) =

English actor, singer, author, and translator (1892–1968)

Paul England (17 June 1892 – 21 November 1968 in Newton St Cyres in Devon, was an English actor, singer, author.

Born at Streatham in 1893, England was educated at Whitgift School. Beyond his career as an actor and broadcaster, he was also a singer and writer. As a singer, he appeared in musicals in London's West End and on Broadway.

England's first film was Just a Girl (1916), in the silent era, in which he played a miner, opposite Daisy Burrell. He later appeared in Knee Deep in Daisies (1926) and in the era of talking films had roles in Charlie Chan in London (1934), Disputed Passage (1939), The Invisible Man Returns (1940) The Earl of Chicago (1940), and The Trial of Madame X (1955), the last of which he also wrote and directed.
