= The Night Riders (1920 film) =

1920 film

- Directed by: Alexander Butler
- Written by: Irene Miller
- Produced by: G. B. Samuelson
- Starring: Maudie Dunham; Albert Ray; Alexander Butler; Russell Gordon
- Production company: G. B. Samuelson Productions
- Distributed by: General Film Distributors
- Release date: July 1920
- Running time: 5,000 feet
- Country: Great Britain
- Languages: Silent; English intertitles

The Night Riders is a 1920 British silent Western film directed by Alexander Butler and starring Maudie Dunham, Albert Ray and Alexander Butler. It was one of several films made by the British producer G. B. Samuelson at Universal City in California.

== Plot ==
A Cornish emigrant to Canada battles against cattle rustlers in Alberta.

== Cast ==
- Maudie Dunham as Diana Marbolt
- Albert Ray as John Tresler
- "Andre Beaulieu" (Alexander Butler) as Jack Marbolt
- Russell Gordon as Jake Harnach
- C. McCarthy as Doctor Ostler
- Joe De La Cruz as Undetermined Role
- Goober Glenn
- William Ryno

== Bibliography ==
- Low, Rachael. History of the British Film, 1918–1929. George Allen & Unwin, 1971.
