= Mr. Pim Passes By (film) =

1921 film

- Directed by: Albert Ward
- Based on: Mr. Pim Passes By by A.A. Milne
- Starring: Peggy Hyland; Campbell Gullan; Maudie Dunham; Tom Reynolds
- Production company: G.B. Samuelson Productions
- Distributed by: General Film Distributors
- Release date: April 1921
- Running time: 6,077 feet
- Country: United Kingdom
- Languages: Silent; English intertitles

Mr. Pim Passes By is a 1921 British silent comedy film directed by Albert Ward and starring Peggy Hyland, Campbell Gullan and Maudie Dunham. It was based on the 1919 play Mr. Pim Passes By by A.A. Milne.

== Premise ==
A woman believes her husband is dead but the latter comes back. His wife, however, will not ’remarry' him unless he changes his mind about their niece’s wedding, which he had so far refused to allow.

== Cast ==
- Peggy Hyland as Olivia Marsden
- Campbell Gullan as Carraway Pim
- Maudie Dunham as Diana Marsden
- Tom Reynolds as James Brymer
- Henry Kendall as Brian Strange
- Hubert Harben as George Marsden
- Annie Esmond as Lady Marsden
- Wyndham Guise as Mr. Fanshawe

== Bibliography ==
- Low, Rachael. History of the British Film, 1918-1929. George Allen & Unwin, 1971.
