= The Sorrows of Satan (1926 film) =

1926 film directed by D. W. Griffith

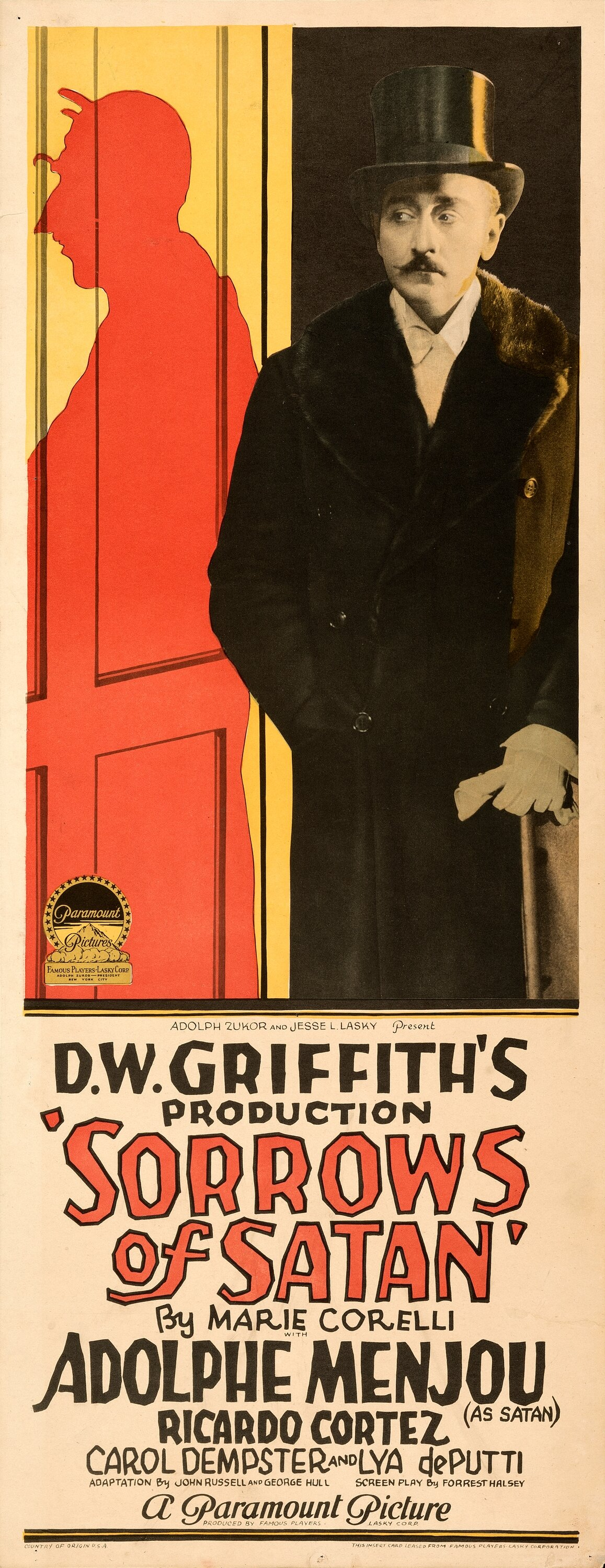
- Release insert poster
- Directed by: D. W. Griffith
- Written by: Forrest Halsey; George C. Hull; John Russell
- Based on: The Sorrows of Satan by Marie Corelli
- Starring: Adolphe Menjou; Ricardo Cortez; Carol Dempster; Lya De Putti; Ivan Lebedeff
- Cinematography: Harry A. Fischbeck; Arthur De Titta
- Edited by: Julian Johnson; James Smith
- Music by: Hugo Riesenfeld
- Distributed by: Paramount Pictures
- Release date: October 12, 1926
- Running time: 90 minutes (9 reels)
- Country: United States
- Language: Silent (English intertitles)
- Budget: $1,050,000
- Box office: $1,750,000

The full film

The Sorrows of Satan is a 1926 American silent drama film directed by D. W. Griffith, and based on the 1895 allegorical horror novel The Sorrows of Satan by Marie Corelli.

Reportedly Griffith did not want to do this project, but as his first Paramount Pictures assignment he was not given a choice. However, the film turned out to be one of Griffith's most fully realized works and its critical stock has risen considerably in the last several decades.

The film featured Carol Dempster in her final screen role, although she lived until 1991.

== Plot ==
As described in a film magazine review, the old tale is told of how the archangel Lucifer defied the authority of God and was dismissed from heaven until by a redemption of souls he again earns his right in the high places. Struggling writer Geoffrey Tempest denounces God and declares himself willing to sell his soul to the devil in return for worldly possessions. His wish is granted when Prince Lucio de Rimanez appears and leads him on a merry pace, informing Tempest that he has inherited a fortune with the only proviso is that Tempest must place his fate entirely in the Prince's hands. Rimanez, who is in fact really Satan, influences Tempest to abandon his sweetheart Mavis Clare. Tempest tastes life at its sweetest, or at its bitterest, as you will, and ascends to the uppermost rungs of European society. He is ordered to marry Russian Princess Olga, who becomes infatuated with Rimanez. The latter spurns her, but Tempest sees her infidelity. The Princess commits suicide, and Tempest continues on his way. Later, when he can no longer stand this sort of life, he realizes that money is not everything. It is here that Rimanez drops his role of benefactor and reveals himself in his true light. Tempest returns to Mavis, whose belief in God is sufficient to thwart the devil. Rimanez fades from view, the inference being that he is now closer to heaven. Tempest lives happily ever after with Mavis.

== Cast ==
- Adolphe Menjou as Prince Lucio de Rimanez
- Ricardo Cortez as Geoffrey Tempest
- Carol Dempster as Mavis Clare
- Lya De Putti as Princess Olga
- Ivan Lebedeff as Amiel
- Nellie Savage as the dancer

== Production ==
It was Griffith's first film for Paramount Pictures following a string of independent productions. After Griffith finished the film, it was taken out of his control and re-edited by Julian Johnson.

A version of Corelli's novel had been filmed in England in 1917, but Griffith's adaptation was closer to the novel.

This film, like The Queen of Sheba (1921) and Ben-Hur (1925), was released in a different edit in Europe due to its nudity. The American version of The Sorrows of Satan had Lya de Putti's character play a nightclub scene with enough attire to pass the censors. In the European version, Griffith shot the nightclub scene with de Putti bare breasted.

== Cultural influence ==
A still from the film was used on the cover of the 1979 song "Bela Lugosi's Dead" by the English band Bauhaus.

== See also ==
- The Devil (1921)
