= Dr. Wake's Patient =

1916 British film by Fred Paul

- Directed by: Fred Paul
- Written by: Robert Ord (play); W. Gayer Mackey; Harry Engholm
- Starring: Phyllis Dare; Gerald McCarthy; James Lindsay; Mary Rorke
- Production company: G.B. Samuelson Productions
- Distributed by: Moss
- Release date: October 1916
- Country: United Kingdom
- Language: English

Dr. Wake's Patient is a 1916 British silent romance film directed by Fred Paul and starring Phyllis Dare, Gerald McCarthy and James Lindsay. A doctor, who is a farmer's son, falls in love with one of his patients who comes from a wealthy aristocratic background.

== Cast ==
- Phyllis Dare - Lady Gerania
- Gerald McCarthy - Dr. Wake
- James Lindsay - The Earl
- Mary Rorke - Mrs. Wake
- Wyndham Guise - Farmer Wake
- Dora Barton - The Countess
