= Maudie Dunham =

British actress (1902–1982)

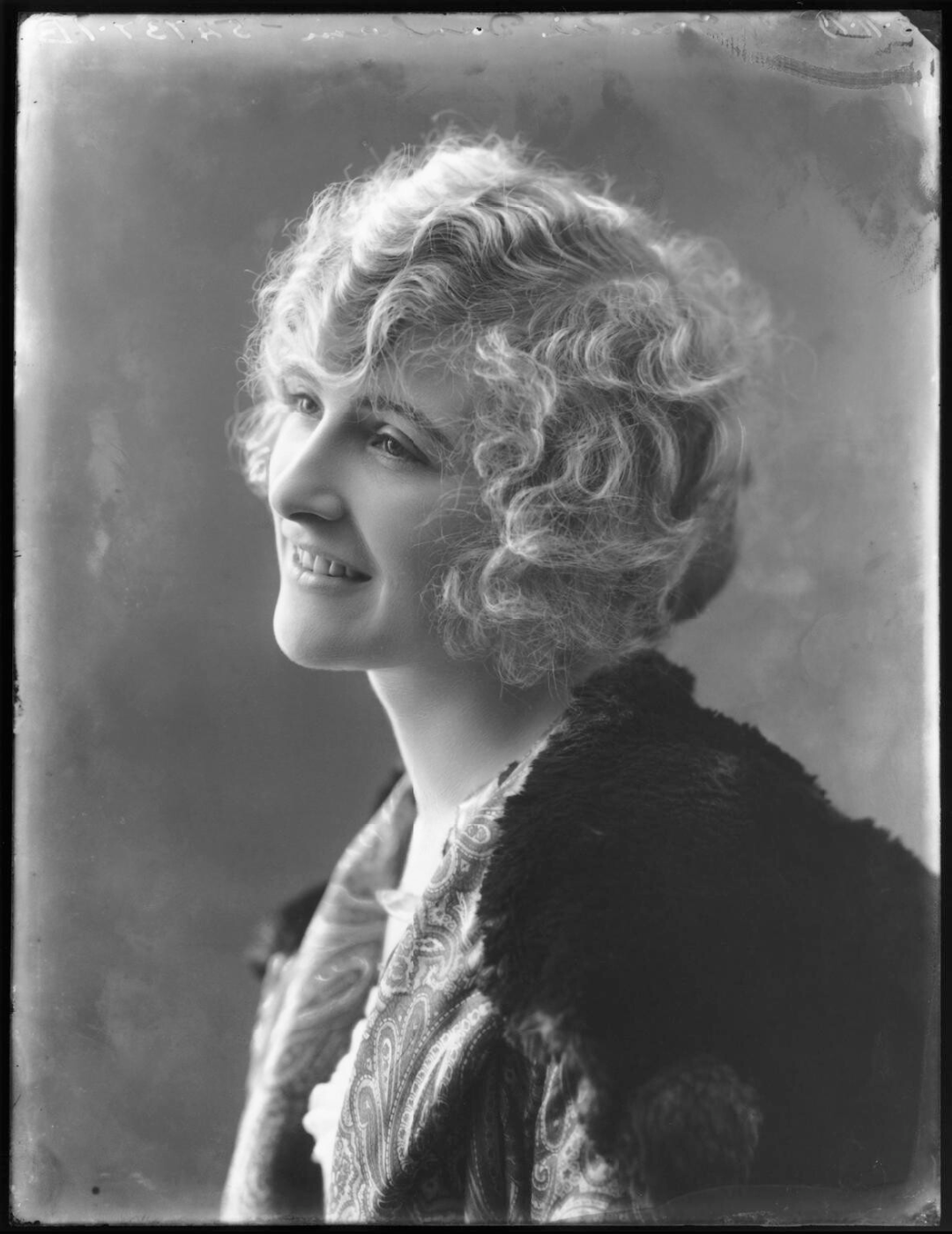
Dunham in 1919, by Bassano Ltd

Maudie Dunham (1902 in Doddinghurst, Essex – 1982 in Kensington, London) was an English actress. She was known for her work in theatre and silent film.

== Personal life ==
She married fellow actor Haddon Mason.

== Filmography ==
- The Beetle (1919)
- The Winning Goal (1920)
- The Ugly Duckling (1920)
- Love in the Wilderness (1920)
- The Night Riders (1920)
- A Temporary Gentleman (1920)
- All the Winners (1920)
- The Magistrate (1921)
- Mr. Pim Passes By (1921)
- Love Maggy (1921)
- Sinister Street (1922)
- What Money Can Buy (1928)
