= Albert Ward (film director) =

British screenwriter and director

Albert Ward (1870-1956) was a British screenwriter and film director. He also play the role of William Shakespeare in the 1914 biopic of the playwright's career The Life of Shakespeare.

== Selected filmography ==
Director

- The Pleydell Mystery (1916)
- A Member of Tattersall's (1919)
- The Pride of the Fancy (1920)
- Aunt Rachel (1920)
- The Last Rose of Summer (1920)
- Stable Companions (1922)
