= Married Love (film) =

1923 film

- Directed by: Alexander Butler
- Written by: Marie Stopes; Walter Summers
- Produced by: G.B. Samuelson
- Starring: Lillian Hall-Davis; Rex Davis; Sydney Fairbrother; Sam Livesey
- Cinematography: Sydney Blythe
- Production company: Napoleon Films
- Distributed by: Napoleon Films
- Release date: May 1923
- Running time: 6,200 feet
- Country: United Kingdom
- Languages: Silent; English intertitles

Married Love is a 1923 British silent drama film directed by Alexander Butler and starring Lillian Hall-Davis, Rex Davis and Sydney Fairbrother. It was also known by the alternative titles Married Life and Maisie's Marriage. The film was loosely based on the 1918 non-fiction book Married Love by Marie Stopes.

== Cast ==
- Lillian Hall-Davis as Maisie Burrows
- Rex Davis as Dick Reading
- Sydney Fairbrother as Mrs. Burrows
- Sam Livesey as Mr. Burrows
- Roger Livesey as Henry Burrows
- Mary Brough as Mrs. Reading
- Bert Darley as Mr. Sterling
- Gladys Harvey as Mrs. Sterling

== Production ==
The film was written by Marie Stopes with Walter Summers.

== Release ==
Originally entitled Married Love, after her book, it was subsequently subject to a censorship campaign by the Home Office and British Board of Film Censors and changed first to Maisie’s Marriage then released as Married Life in May 1923.

"that there were many scenes and sub-titles which rendered the film unsuitable for exhibition before ordinary audiences, while the title, taken in conjunction with the name of the book and the authoress referred to, suggested propaganda on a subject unsuitable for discussion in a cinema theatre" - Examiners of the Board of Film Censors

"The Publishers of the film then approached the Board of Film Censors, offering to eliminate all incidents from the film dealing with the question of birth control and to make no mention in the posters or other printed matter that the film was founded on Dr Marie Stopes' book Married Love." - S. W. Harris, Home Office
