= Margot Kelly =

Australian hotel manager and restaurateur (1894–1983)

- Born: Margaret Elizabeth Emerson; 15 March 1894; Enoggera, Queensland, Australia
- Died: 25 September 1983 (aged 89); Kangaroo Point, Queensland, Australia
- Other name: Margaret Elizabeth Kelly
- Occupation: restauranteur
- Known for: the Hibiscus Room
- Spouse: Edward Charles Patrick Kelly

Margaret Elizabeth "Margot" Kelly born Margaret Elizabeth Emerson (15 March 1894 – 25 September 1983) was an Australian hotel manager and restaurateur. For over twenty years she had the Hibiscus Room in Surfers Paradise in Queensland.

== Life ==
Kelly was born in 1894 in the Brisbane suburb of Enoggera. She became an apprentice dressmaker and opened her own clothing boutique. She turned her skills to looking after people after she married the manager of the Charleville Hotel. She and Edward Kelly lived at the hotel in Charleville, Queensland. On 3 February 1931 she lost all of her belongings when fire broke out in the hotel. She was able to get the cash and to drive out her husband's Fiat from its garage but she could not return to their room because of the fire. An inquest was held in the following month.

They began successfully managing the National Hotel in Brisbane in about 1934. She was the license holder. The National Hotel gained a broad clientele. It welcomed service people with a special meal and Lt Philip Mountbatten, General Douglas Macarthur and Noël Coward were among the 500 there each night in what she hoped was a "gentleman's residence".

Edward Kelly died in February 1949 and she moved to Surfer's Paradise where she had a restaurant built which she named after her favourite flower. She was known for wearing a hibiscus and now she had her own "Hibiscus Room". The restaurant targeted the most exclusive of clientele and she demanded the highest standards from them and the entertainers. She would appear each evening in an evening dress and she also expected her clients to dress for dinner. She was known for occasionally singing and dancing at the piano accompanying the visiting musicians. The room had chandeliers and a feature pink light that was shaped like a hibiscus.

She retired from the restaurant in 1971. She was in her eighties and she was disappointed by the standards of her clientele. The requirement for formal dress had been lowered to "smart informal" and Kelly reported that she was very sad when the Prime Minister visited the restaurant wearing a cravat.

Kelly retired to the island of Capri and she died in 1983 in the Brisbane suburb of Kangaroo Point.
