= The Sorrows of Satan =

1895 novel by Marie Corelli

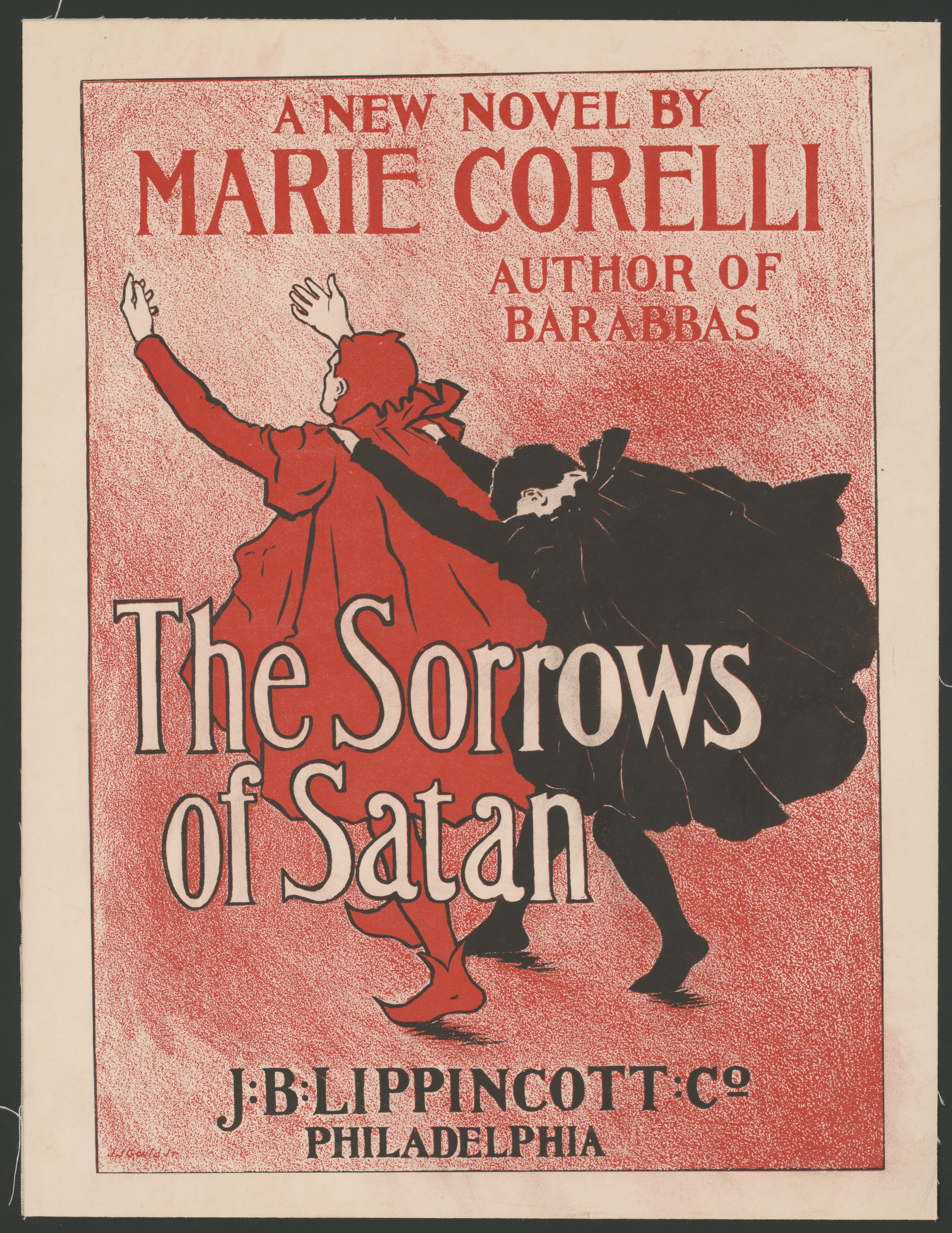
- A poster advertising an American edition of the novel published by J. B. Lippincott Company
- Author: Marie Corelli
- Language: English
- Genre: Horror, social criticism
- Publication date: 21 October 1895
- Publication place: United Kingdom

The Sorrows of Satan is an 1895 Faustian novel by Marie Corelli. It is widely regarded as one of the world's first best-sellers – partly due to an upheaval in the system British libraries used to purchase their books, and partly due to its popular appeal. Roundly condemned by contemporary literary critics for Corelli's moralistic and prosaic style, it nonetheless had strong supporters, including Oscar Wilde and various members of royalty.

Widely ignored in literary circles, it is increasingly regarded as an influential fin de siècle text. The book is occasionally subtitled "Or the Strange Experience of One Geoffrey Tempest, Millionaire".

== Plot summary ==
On the surface the plot follows the story of an author called Geoffrey Tempest, who is so poor that he is behind on his rent and can barely afford light in his room. One day he receives three letters. The first is from a friend in Australia who has made his fortune and offers to introduce him to a good friend who might be able to lift him from poverty. The second is a note from a solicitor detailing that he has inherited a fortune from a deceased relative. The third is a letter of introduction from a foreign aristocrat called Lucio, who befriends him and proceeds to be his guide in how best to use his newfound wealth.

Tempest remains blissfully unaware throughout the novel, despite warnings from people he meets, that Lucio is the earthly incarnation of the Devil. Over the course of the book, his wealth leads to misery. Eventually, when confronted with the true nature of his companion, he renounces evil and returns to society penniless but content with the chance to purify his soul.

== Major themes ==
The novel is notable for its attempts to mix Christian thought with popular heterodox themes of the day, such as reincarnation and Theosophy or Blavatskyism. It is also a critique of the time's social structure – claiming both that Britain's elite are morally bankrupt and hinting an allegiance to ideals that soon gained in prominence after its publication (such as women's suffrage and the universal welfare state).

It also touches on other issues, from the nature of appearance versus reality to the role of poverty in fostering true talent. Corelli is particularly scathing of literary critics (perhaps accounting for their dislike of the work) judging that the only true measure of a book's success is whether common people will buy and read it.

== Critical reception ==
Horror critic R. S. Hadji placed The Sorrows of Satan at number one in his list of the worst horror novels ever written.

Brian Stableford, discussing Corelli's "narcissistic" novels, described The Sorrows of Satan thus: "as delusions of grandeur and expressions of devout wish-fulfilment go, the fascination of the Devil was an unsurpassable masterstroke".

== Adaptations ==
- Films based upon the book include The Sorrows of Satan (1917), Leaves from Satan's Book (1921) and The Sorrows of Satan (1926).
- A 2017 Off West End musical version written by Luke Bateman and Michael Conley premiered at the Tristan Bates theatre in London.
