= Campbell Gullan =

Scottish actor (1881–1939)

- portrait by Bassano Ltd., 1919
- Born: 20 July 1881; Glasgow, Scotland
- Died: 1 December 1939 (aged 58); New York, U.S.
- Occupation: Actor

Campbell Gullan (20 July 1881, in Glasgow – 1 December 1939, in New York City) was a Scottish actor.

== Partial filmography ==
- Caste (1915) - Sam Gerridge
- Far from the Madding Crowd (1915)
- The Great Adventure (1916) - Reporter
- A Place in the Sun (1916) - Arthur Blagden
- Comin' Thro' the Rye (1916) - George Tempest
- Milestones (1916) - Sir John Rhead
- Charity (1919) - Samuel Pester
- A Member of Tattersall's (1919) - Foxey
- The Right Element (1919) - Frank Kemble
- Damaged Goods (1919) - George Dupont
- Love in the Wilderness (1920) - Hon. Dicky Byrd
- At the Mercy of Tiberius (1920) - Col. Luke Darrington
- Her Story (1920) - Oscar Kaplan
- The Honeypot (1920) - Lord Chalfont
- Love Maggy (1921) - Lord Chalfont
- Mr. Pim Passes By (1921) - Carraway Pim
- Tilly of Bloomsbury (1921) - Percy Welwyn
- Single Life (1921) - Gerald Hunter
- The Game of Life (1922) - Edward Travers
- If Four Walls Told (1922) - David Rysling
- The Right to Strike (1923) - Montague
- Lily of the Alley (1923) - Sharkey
- The Hotel Mouse (1923) - Merchant
- Strangling Threads (1923) - Martin Forsdyke KC
- I Pagliacci (1923) - Tonio
- Castles in the Air (1923)
- S.O.S. (1928) - Karensky
- Pleasure Crazed (1929) - Gilbert Ferguson
- Inquest (1931) - Norman Dennison
- The Flying Squad (1932) - Tiser
- Red Ensign (1934) - Hannay
- Jew Süss (1934) - Prince of Thurn & Taxis
- The Iron Duke (1934) - D'Artois
- The Price of a Song (1935) - Arnold Grierson
- East Meets West (1936) - Veka
- The End of the Road (1936) - David
- Wedding Group (1936)
- The Black Tulip (1937) - Isaac Boxtel
- The Last Curtain (1937) - Sir Alan Masterville
- The Claydon Treasure Mystery (1938) - Tollemache
