= James Lindsay (actor) =

British actor (1869–1928)

James Lindsay (26 February 1869 – 9 June 1928) was a British actor.

Lindsay was born in Devon, England, UK and died in Melbourne, Australia at age 59.

== Selected filmography ==
- In the Ranks (1914)
- Lost and Won (1915)
- The Lyons Mail (1916)
- Her Greatest Performance (1916)
- Dr. Wake's Patient (1916)
- The Girl Who Loves a Soldier (1916)
- A Gamble for Love (1917)
- The Snare (1918)
- A Fortune at Stake (1918)
- Missing the Tide (1918)
- The Admirable Crichton (1918)
- A Member of Tattersall's (1919)
- Damaged Goods (1919)
- Mrs. Thompson (1919)
- Edge O' Beyond (1919)
- A Little Bit of Fluff (1919)
- Aunt Rachel (1920)
- The Honeypot (1920)
- The Grip of Iron (1920)
- Nance (1920)
- For Her Father's Sake (1921)
- Love Maggy (1921)
- All Sorts and Conditions of Men (1921)
- The Bachelor's Club (1921)
- The Game of Life (1922)
- What Price Loving Cup? (1923)
- Rogues of the Turf (1923)
- M'Lord of the White Road (1923)
- What Price Loving Cup? (1923)
- Afterglow (1923)
- The Temptation of Carlton Earle (1923)
- Lights of London (1923)
- The Cost of Beauty (1924)
- Claude Duval (1924)
- The World of Wonderful Reality (1924)
- The Choice (1925)
- Forbidden Cargoes (1925)
- Beating the Book (1926)
- The Rat (1926)
- One of the Best (1927)
