= Lillian Hall-Davis =

English actress (1898–1933)

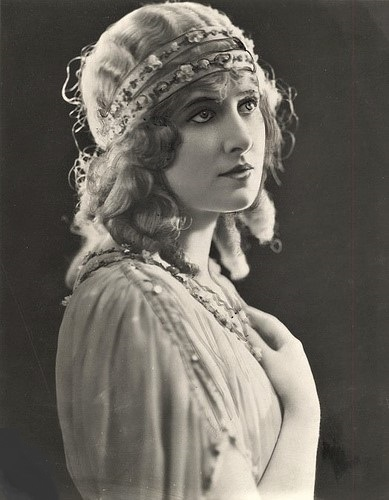
- Born: Lilian Hall Davis; 23 June 1898; Mile End, London, England
- Died: 25 October 1933 (aged 35); Golders Green, Greater London, England
- Occupation: Actress
- Years active: 1917–1931
- Spouse: Walter Pemberton
- Children: 1 son

Lillian Hall-Davis (23 June 1898 – 25 October 1933) was an English actress during the silent film era, featured in major roles in English film and a number of German, French and Italian films.

== Career ==
Born Lilian Hall Davis, the daughter of a London taxi driver, her first film role came in 1915. Further films included a part-colour version of Pagliacci (1923), The Passionate Adventure (1924), Blighty (1927), The Ring (1927) and The Farmer's Wife (1928), the latter two directed by Alfred Hitchcock, who at the time considered her his favourite actress. She had a lead role in a "lavish production" of Quo Vadis (1924), an Italian film directed by Gabriellino D'Annunzio and Georg Jacoby.

Hall-Davis also appeared in As We Lie (1927), a comedy short film made in the Lee DeForest Phonofilm sound-on-film process, co-starring and directed by Miles Mander.

== Later life and death ==
As her health deteriorated, she was forced to withdraw from acting, though she had expressed hope of returning to the screen once she had recovered. Around 1930, she moved to a new neighbourhood in the Golders Green area of London, where she knew no one. Around September 1933, Hall-Davis confided in a neighbour that she spent most of her time alone and that her friends no longer made time to visit. She admitted to feeling depressed, citing both the lack of acting work and the quietness of the neighbourhood. However, several people in the film industry later stated she had been invited to take part in films earlier that year, to which she responded that her nerves had gone and no longer felt able to act.

On 25 October 1933, her 14-year-old son returned home from school to find a handwritten note from his mother, asking him to fetch a neighbour. She had also locked the door to prevent him from entering. Her body was later discovered on the floor of her gas-filled kitchen, with a razor blade nearby and a wound to her throat. Her husband Walter Pemberton, also an actor, was away in Bristol at the time of her death.

Police later confirmed that her death was caused by the self-inflicted throat wound, rather than from gas inhalation. At the inquest, the coroner ruled that she had died by suicide while of unsound mind.

== Filmography ==
- La p'tite du sixième (1917)
- The Admirable Crichton (1918)
- The Romance of Old Bill (1918)
- Ernest Maltravers (1920)
- The Honeypot (1920)
- Love Maggy (1921)
- The Wonderful Story (1922)
- The Faithful Heart (1922)
- Brown Sugar (1922)
- Stable Companions (1922)
- The Game of Life (1922)
- If Four Walls Told (1922)
- The Knockout (1923)
- Married Love (1923)
- The Right to Strike (1923)
- Castles in the Air (1923)
- The Hotel Mouse (1923)
- Afterglow (1923)
- I Pagliacci (1923)
- A Royal Divorce (1923)
- The Passionate Adventure (1924)
- The Eleventh Commandment (1924)
- Quo Vadis (1924)
- The Unwanted (1924)
- The Farmer from Texas (1925)
- Express Train of Love (1925)
- Nitchevo (1926)
- Three Cuckoo Clocks (1926)

Adventure Mad, in the United States by Paramount Pictures

- Love is Blind (1926)
- If Youth But Knew (1926)
- Roses of Picardy (1927)
- The Prey of the Wind (1927)
- Blighty (1927)
- The Ring (1927)
- Boadicea (1928)
- The White Sheik (1928)
- The Farmer's Wife (1928)
- Tommy Atkins (1928)
- Volga Volga (1928)
- Just for a Song (1930) filmed partly in Pathécolor
- Her Reputation (1931)
- Many Waters (1931)
