= Convict 99 (1919 film) =

1919 British film by G .B. Samuelson

- Directed by: G. B. Samuelson
- Written by: Robert Leighton; Marie Connor Leighton
- Produced by: G. B. Samuelson
- Starring: Wee Georgie Wood; Daisy Burrell; Wyndham Guise
- Production company: G. B. Samuelson Productions
- Release date: 1919
- Country: United Kingdom
- Language: English

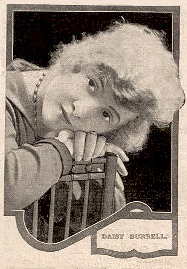
Daisy Burrell in 1919, from the cover of Pictures and Picturegoer magazine dated May 10–17, 1919

Convict 99 is a British silent motion picture of 1919 produced and directed by G. B. Samuelson and starring Daisy Burrell, C. M. Hallard, Wee Georgie Wood, and Wyndham Guise. It was written by Robert Leighton and Marie Connor Leighton.

== Outline ==
A comedy, the film consists of six reels. Ralph Vickers is a villainous convict, working against a mill owner, Mr Lucas, who has a pretty daughter, Geraldine, and an office boy who in the end baffles the designs of Vickers.

The film premiered at a Trade Show in April 1919.

== Reception ==
The Era said on 9 April 1919 ”Mr. C. M. Hallard gives a finished portraiture of the villainous Ralph Vickers, Miss Daisy Burrell makes a pretty and vivacious heroine, and Wee Wood is most successful in the comedy part of James, the office boy.

The Era Dramatic & Musical Almanack commented “Convict 99 made a big hit... It features Wee Georgie Wood and Daisy Burrell. It is slightly sensational, with good comedy relief and some quite pathetic parts.”

== Overseas ==
Convict 99 was at the Gaiety Cinema, Singapore, in February 1920, when it was advertised as -

Samuelson presents the all British production starring C. M. Hallard and Daisy Burrell in CONVICT 99 by M. Connor and R. Leighton in 6 parts

It was shown in Singapore again in November 1921, this time at the Empire.

== Cast ==
- Wyndham Guise – Mr Lucas (mill owner)
- Daisy Burrell – Geraldine Lucas (mill owner's daughter)
- Wee Georgie Wood – James (office boy)
- Tom Coventry – Hewett (time-keeper)
- Ernest A. Graham – Lawrence Gray (manager)
- C. M. Hallard – Ralph Vickers (assistant manager)
- Arnold Bell – Warder Gannaway
