= Rex Davis =

British actor, boxer, soldier, politician (1890–1951)

Captain Reginald Graham Davis MBE MC (7 November 1890 – 1 December 1951) was a British soldier, silent film actor and sportsman.

== Biography ==
Davis was born in Keymer, Sussex, in 1890. According to one source, he got his start in films because he was a good amateur boxer. He also played field hockey for the Richmond Hockey Club.

Davis had done several movies by the time the First World War broke out in August 1914. In July 1918, he was awarded the Military Cross "For conspicuous gallantry and devotion to duty."

He was the Conservative candidate in the by-election of 1932 for Wednesbury, but was defeated by Labour politician John Banfield.

Davis stayed in the military and was promoted to captain. In the 1943 Birthday Honours, he was made a Member of the Order of the British Empire. He died in East Wittering, Sussex, in 1951, after a painful illness.

== Selected filmography ==
- The House of Temperley (1913)
- The Fool (1913)
- For Her People (1914)
- The Shepherd Lassie of Argyle (1914)
- Won by a Head (1920)
- The Pride of the Fancy (1920)
- Uncle Bernac (1921)
- Mord Em'ly (1922)
- All Sorts and Conditions of Men (1921)
- The Crimson Circle (1922)
- The Lion's Mouse (1923)
- A Couple of Down and Outs (1923)
- The Knockout (1923)
- Married Love (1923)
- Every Mother's Son (1926)
- Motherland (1927)

== Bibliography ==
- Bamford, Kenton. Distorted Images: British National Identity and Film in the 1920s. I.B. Tauris, 1999.
