= The Knockout (1923 film) =

1923 film

- Directed by: Alexander Butler
- Written by: Walter Summers
- Produced by: G.B. Samuelson
- Starring: Lillian Hall-Davis; Rex Davis; Josephine Earle; Tom Reynolds
- Cinematography: Sydney Blythe
- Production company: Napoleon Films
- Distributed by: Jury Films
- Release date: May 1923
- Running time: 6 reels
- Country: United Kingdom
- Languages: Silent; English intertitles

The Knockout is a 1923 British silent sports film directed by Alexander Butler and starring Lillian Hall-Davis, Rex Davis and Josephine Earle.

== Cast ==
- Lillian Hall-Davis as Polly Peach
- Rex Davis as Billy Berks
- Josephine Earle as Lady Clare
- Tom Reynolds as Manager
- Julian Royce as Guy Ballinger
- Mickey Brantford as Scout

== Bibliography ==
- Low, Rachael. History of the British Film, 1918-1929. George Allen & Unwin, 1971.
