= A Royal Divorce (1923 film) =

1923 film

- Directed by: Alexander Butler
- Written by: Walter Summers
- Based on: A Royal Divorce by C.C. Collingham
- Produced by: G.B. Samuelson; S.W. Smith
- Starring: Gwylim Evans; Gertrude McCoy; Lillian Hall-Davis
- Production company: Napoleon Films
- Distributed by: Napoleon Films
- Release date: January 1923
- Running time: 100 minutes
- Country: United Kingdom
- Languages: Silent; English intertitles

A Royal Divorce is a 1923 British silent historical drama film directed by Alexander Butler and starring Gwylim Evans, Gertrude McCoy and Lillian Hall-Davis. It was based on a play by C.C. Collingham and depicts the romantic relationship and political divorce between Napoleon and his wife Josephine. It reportedly did well at the box office when released in the United States, possibly reflecting the strategy of casting an American star McCoy in a leading role. It was remade as a sound film, A Royal Divorce, in 1938.

== Cast ==
- Gwylim Evans as Napoleon
- Gertrude McCoy as Josephine
- Lillian Hall-Davis as Stephanie
- Gerald Ames as Marques de Beaumont
- Mary Dibley as Marie-Louise
- Jerrold Robertshaw as Talleyrand
- Tom Reynolds as Grimand
- Mercy Peters as King of Rome

== Bibliography ==
- Low, Rachael. The History of British Film, Volume 4 1918-1929. Routledge, 1997.
- Street, Sarah. Transatlantic Crossings: British Feature Films in the USA. A&C Black, 2002.
