= Owen Nares =

English actor (1888–1943)

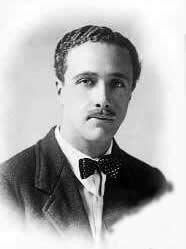
- Owen Nares
- Born: Owen Ramsay Nares; 11 August 1888; Maiden Erlegh, Berkshire, England
- Died: 30 July 1943 (aged 54); Brecon, Brecknockshire, Wales
- Years active: 1913–1941
- Spouse: Marie Pollini (m. 1910)
- Children: 2 sons

Owen Ramsay Nares (11 August 1888 – 30 July 1943) was an English stage and film actor. Besides his acting career, he was the author of Myself, and Some Others (1925).

== Early life ==
Educated at Reading School, Nares was encouraged by his mother to become an actor, and in 1908 he received his training from actress Rosina Filippi. The following year, he was playing bit parts in West End productions, including the St. James’s Theatre and the Pinero’s Mid Channel. Over the next few years, as his reputation grew, he performed with many of the outstanding actors of the era, including Beerbohm Tree, Constance Collier, and Marion Terry.

== Career ==
In 1914, Nares appeared in Dandy Donovan, the first of the 25 silent films in which he appeared. The early 1920s was his golden period and he was the male lead opposite such actresses as Gladys Cooper, Fay Compton, Madge Titheradge and Daisy Burrell. His stage career also continued to flourish.

In 1915, he played Thomas Armstrong, opposite Doris Keane, in Edward Sheldon's Romance; it opened at the Duke of York's Theatre, transferring during the run to the Lyric Theatre. In 1917, he starred with Lily Elsie at the Palace Theatre in the musical comedy, Pamela. He appeared opposite Meggie Albanesi in The First and the Last for a long-run during the 1920s. In 1925, he appeared in The River by Patrick Hastings. Nares continued to star in popular West End shows, almost without pause, until 1926, when he then took a break and set off with his own company for a tour of South Africa.

== Later years ==
With the advent of talkies, his considerable stage experience meant that, in the early days, he was still much in demand and starred in four films. He was, however, too mature to be the youthful, handsome star he had been a decade earlier. In the last six films he made, he played supporting roles. In 1942, he appeared in a revival of Robert E. Sherwood’s The Petrified Forrest, and afterwards he went on tour with the play to Northern England and Wales.

== Family ==
Nares married actress Marie Pollini in 1910; the couple had two sons, David and Geoffrey.

== Death ==
During tour through Wales, touring Army training camps, he visited Brecon, and the Shoulder of Mutton (now the Sarah Siddons public house), the birthplace of actress Sarah Siddons. While touring the room where Siddons was born, Nares had a heart attack and died shortly afterwards, aged 54, on 30 July 1943.

== Filmography ==
- Danny Donovan, the Gentleman Cracksman (1914) - Frank Ashworth
- Just a Girl (1916) - Lord Trafford
- Milestones (1916) - Lord Monkhurst
- The Sorrows of Satan (1917) - Geoffrey Tempest
- The Labour Leader (1917) - Gilbert Hazlitt
- One Summer's Day (1917) - Captain Dick Rudyard
- Flames (1917) - Valentine Creswell
- Tinker, Tailor, Soldier, Sailor (1918) - John Tinker
- The Man Who Won (1918) - Captain Bert Brook
- Onward Christian Soldiers (1918) - The Soldier
- Gamblers All (1919) - Harold Tempest
- Edge O' Beyond (1919) - Dr. Cecil Lawson
- The Elder Miss Blossom (1919) - Curate
- The Last Rose of Summer (1920) - Oliver Selwyn
- A Temporary Gentleman (1920) - Walter Hope
- All the Winners (1920) - Tim Hawker
- For Her Father's Sake (1921) - Walter Cardew
- Brown Sugar (1922) - Lord Sloane
- The Faithful Heart (1922) - Waverley Ango
- The Indian Love Lyrics (1923) - Prince Zahindin
- Young Lochinvar (1923) - Lochinvar
- Miriam Rozella (1924) - Rudolph
- This Marriage Business (1927) - Robert
- Loose Ends (1930) - Malcolm Ferres
- The Middle Watch (1930) - Captain Maitland
- The Woman Between (1931) - Tom Smith
- Sunshine Susie (1931) - Herr Arvray
- Frail Women (1932) - The Man - Colonel Leonard Harvey
- Aren't We All? (1932) - Willie
- The Impassive Footman (1932) - Bryan Daventry
- The Love Contract (1932) - Neville Cardington
- There Goes the Bride (1932) - Max
- Where Is This Lady? (1932) - Rudi Muller
- Discord (1933) - Peter Stenning
- One Precious Year (1933) - Stephen Carton
- The Private Life of Don Juan (1934) - Antonio Martinez
- Royal Cavalcade (1935) - Gentleman
- I Give My Heart (1935) - Louis XV
- Head Office (1936) - Henry Crossman
- The Show Goes On (1937) - Martin Fraser
- The Prime Minister (1941) - Lord Derby (Last appearance)

== Selected stage roles ==
- Milestones (1912)
- Diplomacy (1913)
- Peter Ibbetson (1915)
- Romance (1915)
- Mr. Todd's Experiment (1920)
- The Enchanted Cottage (1922)
- Quarantine (1922)
- The River (1925)
- Call It a Day (1935)
