= Minna Grey =

English actress

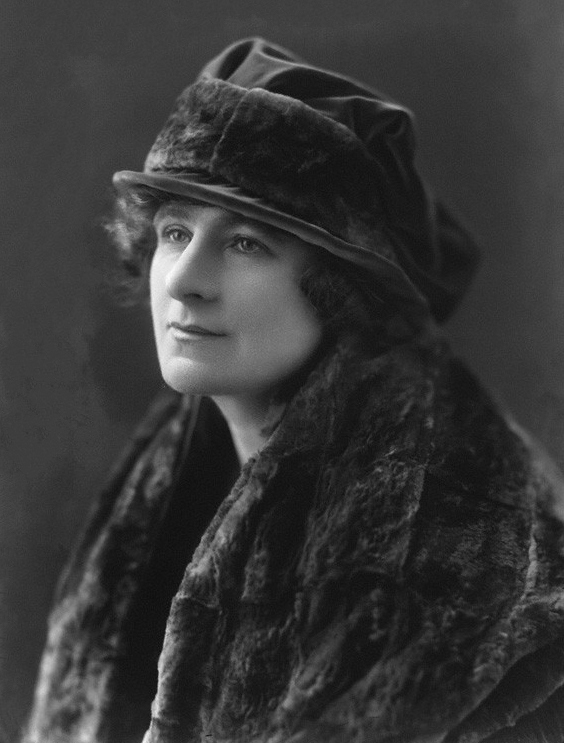
- Grey in 1919
- Born: 1877; London, England
- Died: 1935 (aged 57–58); Westminster, London, England
- Occupation: Silent film actress
- Spouse: Simeon Francis Jacobs

Minna Grey (1877 – 1935) was an English actress of the silent era.

== Death ==
Grey died in 1935, at age 58.

== Selected filmography ==
- The MiddleMan (1915)
- The Shulamite (1915)
- Just a Girl (1916)
- The Second Mrs. Tanqueray (1916)
- The Manxman (1917)
- The Happy Warrior (1917)
- Little Women (1917)
- The Sorrows of Satan (1917)
- The Elder Miss Blossom (1918)
- Onward Christian Soldiers (1918)
- Mrs. Thompson (1919)
- The Edge O' Beyond (1919)
- The Husband Hunter (1920)
- The Last Rose of Summer (1920)
- Dangerous Lies (1921)
- When We Were 21 (1921)
- All Roads Lead to Calvary (1921)
- If Four Walls Told (1922)
- Wee MacGregor's Sweetheart (1922)
- Afterglow (1923)
- The York Mystery (1924)
- A Daughter of Love (1925)
- Somebody's Darling (1925)
- The Woman in White (1929)
