= Alexander Butler =

British film director

- Occupation: Film director
- Years active: 1913–1926

Alexander Butler was a British film director who made over sixty features and short films during the 1910s and 1920s including many for G. B. Samuelson's production company. Butler directed several British films in Hollywood in 1920, where Samuelson had made an arrangement with Universal Pictures. Amongst his notable films are the Sherlock Holmes adaptation The Valley of Fear (1916) and the early British horror film The Beetle (1919).

== Selected filmography ==
- Just a Girl (1916)
- The Valley of Fear (1916)
- A Pair of Spectacles (1916)
- A Fair Impostor (1916)
- The Girl Who Loves a Soldier (1916)
- Nursie! Nursie! (1916)
- The Sorrows of Satan (1917)
- The Odds Against Her (1919)
- The Beetle (1919)
- The Disappearance of the Judge (1919)
- Damaged Goods (1919)
- David and Jonathan (1920)
- Love in the Wilderness (1920)
- The Ugly Duckling (1920)
- The Night Riders (1920)
- Married Love (1923)
- The Knockout (1923)
- A Royal Divorce (1923)
- I Pagliacci (1923)
- She (1925)

== Bibliography ==
- Low, Rachel. The History of British Film: Volume IV, 1918–1929. Routledge, 1997.
- Nollen, Scott Allen. Sir Arthur Conan Doyle at the Cinema. McFarland & Co., 1996.
- Rigby, Jonathan. English Gothic: A Century of Horror Cinema. Reynolds & Hearn, 2004.
