= G. B. Samuelson =

British film producer (1889–1947)

- Born: 6 July 1889; Southport, England, UK
- Died: 17 April 1947 (aged 57)
- Occupation: Producer
- Children: Sydney, David, Michael Samuelson
- Relatives: Peter Samuelson (grandson); Emma Samms (Emma Wylie Samuelson) (granddaughter)

George Berthold Samuelson (6 July 1889 – 17 April 1947) was a director and film producer.

He ran G. B. Samuelson Productions during the period of 1914 to 1933, producing around 70 films. The company made several films under the names British-Super films and Napoleon Films.

== Biography ==
Born in Southport, Lancashire, Samuelson was the youngest son of Henschel and Bertha Samuelson, tobacconists originally from Prussia. Attended the University School in Southport until the age of 14. By 1891, his mother was widowed and was carrying on the business.

He then held various jobs over a number of years, eventually running a cinema in Southport. In 1910, he founded a film distribution company, the Royal Film Society, with which he moved to Birmingham in the same year. Profits from the firm enabled him to find the Samuelson Film Manufacturing Company in 1913. Here, with Will Barker, he produced the film Sixty Years a Queen, which became a financial success. Samuelson had an extensive film career and was the creator of Southall Studios, one of the earliest film production companies in the United Kingdom. He also ran G. B. Samuelson Productions from 1914 to 1933.

He was the brother of Julian and Lauri Wylie and the father of Sir Sydney Samuelson.

== Selected filmography ==
Producer

- Sixty Years a Queen (1913)
- A Study in Scarlet (1914)
- John Halifax, Gentleman (1915)
- The Valley of Fear (1916)
- Little Women (1917)
- The Elder Miss Blossom (1918)
- Linked by Fate (1919)
- Edge O' Beyond (1919)
- Damaged Goods (1919)
- The Pride of the Fancy (1920)
- The Last Rose of Summer (1920)
- Nance (1920)
- Her Story (1920)
- The Grip of Iron (1920)
- A Temporary Gentleman (1920)
- The Husband Hunter (1920)
- The Night Riders (1920)
- David and Jonathan (1920)
- Love in the Wilderness (1920)
- The Ugly Duckling (1920)
- Mr. Pim Passes By (1921)
- For Her Father's Sake (1921)
- The Magistrate (1921)
- Stable Companions (1922)
- A Couple of Down and Outs (1923)
- Married Love (1923)
- The Knockout (1923)
- A Royal Divorce (1923)
- The Cost of Beauty (1924)
- The Unwanted (1924)

Director

- The Admirable Crichton (1918)
- The Bridal Chair (1919)
- Convict 99 (1919)
- The Game of Life (1922)
- Afterglow (1923)
- A Royal Divorce (1923)
- I Pagliacci (1923)
- Who Is the Man? (1924)
- She (1925)
- Motherland (1927)
- Two Little Drummer Boys (1928)
- The Forger (1928)
- For Valour (1928)
- Valley of the Ghosts (1928)
- Spanish Eyes (1930)
- The Wickham Mystery (1931)
- The Other Woman (1931)
- Collision (1932)
- Threads (1932)
- The Callbox Mystery (1932)
- The Crucifix (1934)
