= A Sister to Assist 'Er =

A Sister to Assist 'Er may refer to:

- A Sister to Assist 'Er (play), a comic play by John le Breton
- A Sister to Assist 'Er (1922 film), a silent film directed by George Dewhurst
- A Sister to Assist 'Er (1927 film), a silent film directed by George Dewhurst
- A Sister to Assist 'Er (1930 film), a sound film directed by George Dewhurst
- A Sister to Assist 'Er (1938 film), a sound film directed by George Dewhurst
- A Sister to Assist 'Er (1948 film), a sound film directed by George Dewhurst
