= A Peep Behind the Scenes =

A Peep Behind the Scenes may refer to:

- A Peep Behind the Scenes (novel), an 1877 British novel by Amy Catherine Walton
- A Peep Behind the Scenes (1918 film), a British silent film directed by Kenelm Foss
- A Peep Behind the Scenes (1929 film), a British silent film directed by Jack Raymond
