= Traitors' Gate (disambiguation) =

Traitors' Gate is a gateway of the Tower of London.

Traitor's, Traitors' or Traitors Gate may also refer to:

== Structures ==
- Traitor's Gate, Murshidabad, gate of the palace at Mushidabad, India
- Fusiliers' Arch in Dublin, Ireland, erected 1907 and named "Traitors' Gate" by critics

== Literature ==
- Traitors Gate, 2023 heist novel by Jeffrey Archer in his William Warwick series
- Traitors' Gate, 2010 high fantasy novel by Kate Elliott, in the Crossroads series
- Traitors Gate, 1995 mystery novel by Anne Perry, in the series featuring Thomas Pitt
- The Traitor's Gate, 1927 novel by Edgar Wallace

== Other media ==
- Traitor's Gate (film), 1964 German-British film
- "Traitor's Gate" (Spooks), 2002 episode of UK TV series Spooks
- Traitors Gate (video game), 1999 video game by Daydream Software
- Traitors Gate, a 1994 album by Chelsea
