= 1877 in literature =

This article contains information about the literary events and publications of 1877.

== Events ==
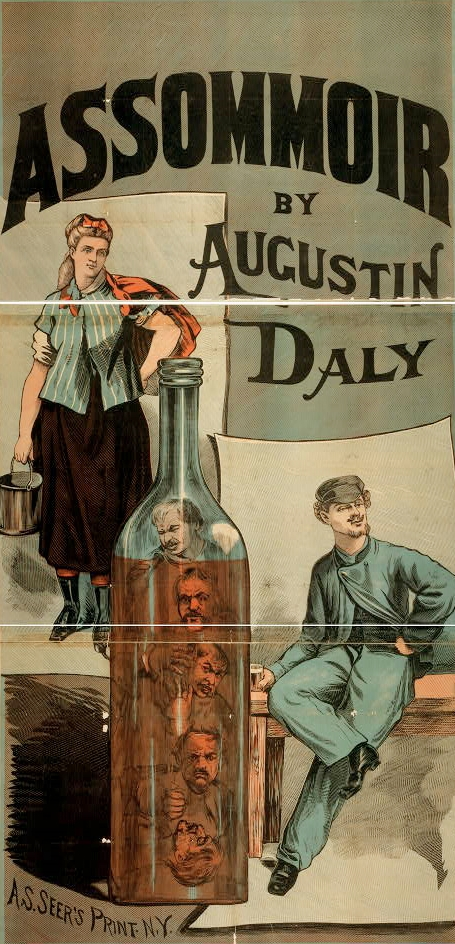
1879 poster for an American theatre production of L'Assommoir by Augustin Daly

- January 24 – Émile Zola's L'Assommoir (sometimes translated as "The Dram Shop"), seventh in his novel sequence Les Rougon-Macquart, is first published in book format a few weeks after its serialisation ends in Le Bien public (Paris). It sells more than 50,000 copies by the end of the year.
- February 24–March 17 – Robert Louis Stevenson's first published work of fiction, the novella "An Old Song", appears anonymously in four episodes in the magazine London. It is first attributed to Stevenson in 1980.
- July – The ending of Leo Tolstoy's Anna Karenina is published in Russkiy vestnik.
- July 15 – "Coppino Law" in Italy makes elementary schools mandatory, free and secular.
- October – Robert Louis Stevenson publishes the short story "A Lodging for the Night" (in Temple Bar magazine), later collected in New Arabian Nights.
- October 15 – Edward L. Wheeler's first story featuring Deadwood Dick, set on the American frontier, opens the first number of Beadle's Half-Dime Library, published in New York.
- November 5 – The Mitchell Library is established in Glasgow.
- November 14 – Henrik Ibsen's first contemporary realist drama The Pillars of Society is premièred at the Odense Teater (having been first published on October 11 in Copenhagen).
- November 24 – Anna Sewell's novel Black Beauty, his grooms and companions: the autobiography of a horse "translated from the equine" is published by Jarrolds of Norwich in England. Her only book, published five months before her death arising from long-standing illness, it rapidly establishes its position as an all-time bestseller, going on to sell fifty million copies and becoming the sixth best seller in the English language.
- December 30 – Swedish dramatist August Strindberg marries his mistress, the divorced actress Siri von Essen, a member of the Finnish-Swedish minor nobility.

== New books ==
=== Fiction ===
- R. M. Ballantyne – The Settler and the Savage
- R. D. Blackmore – Erema; or, my father's sin
- Ned Buntline – Buffalo Bill Trails the Devil Head
- Bankim Chatterjee
  - Chandrasekhar
  - Rajani
- Ion Creangă – Harap Alb
- Fyodor Dostoevsky – "The Dream of a Ridiculous Man" (Сон смешного человека, short story)
- Maria Fetherstonhaugh – Kilcorran
- Gustave Flaubert – Three Tales
- Henry James – The American
- Jan Neruda – Povídky malostranské (Tales of the Little Quarter)
- Margaret Oliphant – Carità
- William Clark Russell – The Wreck of the Grosvenor
- Theodor Storm – Aquis Submersus
- Anthony Trollope
  - The American Senator
  - Is He Popenjoy?
- Jacint Verdaguer – L'Atlàntida
- Jules Verne
  - Hector Servadac
  - Les Indes noires
- Émile Zola – L'Assommoir

=== Children and young people ===
- Louisa May Alcott – Under the Lilacs
- Mary Louisa Molesworth (Mrs. Molesworth) – The Cuckoo Clock
- Anna Sewell – Black Beauty
- Amy Catherine Walton (Mrs. O. F. Walton) – A Peep Behind the Scenes

=== Drama ===
- James Albery – The Pink Dominos
- José Echegaray – Saint or Madman? (O locura o santidad)
- W. S. Gilbert – Engaged
- Henrik Ibsen – The Pillars of Society (Samfundets støtter)
- Adolphe L'Arronge – Hasemann's Daughters

=== Poetry ===
- Edward Lear – Laughable Lyrics (published December 1876, dated 1877)
- Stéphane Mallarmé – Poésies

=== Non-fiction ===
- Henry Spencer Ashbee (as Pisanus Fraxi) – Index Librorum Prohibitorum: being Notes Bio- Biblio- Icono- graphical and Critical on Curious and Uncommon Books
- Helena Blavatsky – Isis Unveiled
- Florence Caddy – Household Organisation
- Amelia Edwards – A Thousand Miles up the Nile
- Henry Miers Elliot (ed. by John Dowson) – The History of India, as Told by Its Own Historians
- Kenneth Mackenzie – Royal Masonic Cyclopedia
- Lewis H. Morgan – Ancient Society
- Shen Fu (沈復) – Six Records of a Floating Life (autobiography; first printed edition)

== Births ==
- January 4 – Sextil Pușcariu, Romanian linguist, philologist and journalist (died 1948)
- February 7 – Alfred Williams, English "hammerman poet" (died 1930)
- March 6 – Rose Fyleman, English writer and poet (died 1957)
- April 14 – Donald Maxwell, English travel writer and illustrator (died 1936)
- April 29 – Henri Stahl, Romanian historian, short story writer, memoirist and stenographer (died 1942)
- June 11 – Renée Vivien, born Pauline Mary Tarn, English-born French-language Symbolist poet (died 1909)
- July 2 – Hermann Hesse, German-Swiss poet, novelist and painter (died 1962)
- August 27 – Lloyd C. Douglas, American novelist and pastor (died 1951)
- September 1 – Rex Beach, American novelist and playwright (died 1949)
- September 9 – James Agate, English diarist and critic (died 1947)
- November 15 – William Hope Hodgson, English fiction writer (killed in action 1918)

== Deaths ==
- January 29 – Caroline Howard Jervey, American author, poet, and teacher (born 1823)
- February 18 – Henrietta A. Bingham, American writer and editor (born 1841)
- April – Ernst Moritz Ludwig Ettmüller, German philologist (born 1802)
- June 15 – Caroline Norton (née Caroline Sheridan), English poet, pamphleteer and social reformer (born 1808)
- June 17 – John Stevens Cabot Abbott, American historian and pastor (born 1805)
- August 30 – Toru Dutt, multilingual Indian Bengali poet, novelist and translator, of pulmonary tuberculosis (born 1856)
- September 12 – Emily Pepys, English child diarist (born 1833)
- October 10 – Johann Georg Baiter, Swiss philologist and critic (born 1801)
- October 16 – Théodore Barrière, French dramatist (born 1823)
- October 28 – Julia Kavanagh, Irish novelist (born 1824)
- December 12 – José de Alencar, Brazilian novelist (born 1829)
