= Lord Richard in the Pantry =

1930 film

- Trade Show advertisement
- Directed by: Walter Forde
- Written by: H. Fowler Mear; Sidney Gilliat
- Based on: Play by: Sydney Blow; Douglas Hoare
- Starring: Richard Cooper; Dorothy Seacombe; Marjorie Hume
- Production company: Julius Hagen Productions
- Release date: 1930
- Country: United Kingdom
- Language: English
- Budget: $85,000
- Box office: $300,000

Lord Richard in the Pantry is a lost 1930 British comedy film directed by Walter Forde and starring Richard Cooper, Dorothy Seacombe and Marjorie Hume. It was written by H. Fowler Mear and Sidney Gilliat based on the 1919 play by Sydney Blow and Douglas Hoare, itself adapted from the 1911 novel by Maurice Nicoll (as Martin Swayne).

== Preservation status ==
The British Film Institute has classed Lord Richard in the Pantry as a lost film, included on its "75 Most Wanted" list. The BFI National Archive holds a collection of stills but no film or video materials.

== Plot summary ==
Lord Richard Sandridge has fallen on hard times, and is obliged to rent out his Berkeley Square mansion to Sylvia Garland, an attractive widow. In disguise, he takes a job as her butler, and she falls in love with him.

== Cast ==
- Richard Cooper as Lord Richard Sandridge
- Dorothy Seacombe as Sylvia Garland
- Marjorie Hume as Lady Violet Elliott
- Leo Sheffield as Carter
- Frederick Volpe as Sir Charles Bundleman
- Barbara Gott as Cook
- Alexander Field as Sam
- Viola Lyel as Evelyn Lovejoy
- Gladys Hamer as Gladys

== Reception ==
Film Weekly wrote: "You will be amused by Lord Richard in the Pantry a well turned-out and very effective comedy. Walter Forde needs no introduction as a director, and here he proves that he can be just as fanny in handling another comedian as in producing himself."

The Daily Film Renter wrote: "Uproarious comedy which will draw big money to the box office. Masterly adaptation of stage success, excellently acted by Richard Cooper and a fine cast, and directed by Walter Forde. ... The cast has been chosen with great skill, so that each individual part adds its quota of laughs to one of the most happy efforts that ever came out of a British studio. Richard Cooper, of course, as Lord Richard, easily walks off with the giant's share of honours. ... There seems to be no question at all but that the picture will be a winner with the public."

Kine Weekly wrote: "A well-acted farce of good quality, adapted from the stage success, which takes some little time to warm up, but once it gets going it is crisp and even, and leads to a succession of laughable situations. Richard Cooper is excellent in the leading role and is one of the main contributors to the picture's success. ... Walter Forde, the producer, has been a little laboured in his treatment of the opening scenes, and it is some time before the plot is really clear, but once the introductory episodes are over, the farce unfolds with an easy sweep."

== See also ==
- List of lost films
