= Money Isn't Everything (1925 film) =

1925 film directed by Thomas Bentley

- Directed by: Thomas Bentley
- Written by: Sophie Cole (novel); Isobel Johnstone
- Starring: Olive Sloane; Lewis Gilbert; Gladys Hamer; John F. Hamilton
- Production company: Stoll Pictures
- Distributed by: Stoll Pictures
- Release date: February 1925
- Country: United Kingdom
- Language: English

Money Isn't Everything is a 1925 British silent romance film directed by Thomas Bentley and starring Olive Sloane, Lewis Gilbert and Gladys Hamer. The film was made at Cricklewood Studios by Stoll Pictures, and was based on a novel by Sophie Cole.

== Cast ==
- Olive Sloane as Elizabeth Tuter
- Lewis Gilbert
- Gladys Hamer as Adele Rockwell
- John F. Hamilton as William Channon
- Arthur Burne as James Rogers
- Gladys Crebbin

== Bibliography ==
- Low, Rachael. History of the British Film, 1918-1929. George Allen & Unwin, 1971.
