= The Head of the Family =

The Head of the Family may refer to:

- The Head of the Family (1922 film), a 1922 British silent comedy film directed by Manning Haynes
- Head of the Family (1933 film), a 1933 British drama film directed by John Daumery
- The Head of the Family (1967 film), a 1967 Italian comedy film directed by Nanni Loy
- Head of the Family, a 1996 B movie black comedy
- Head of the Family (TV pilot)

== See also ==
- The Commission (mafia), the heads of the 5 Families
- Heads of former ruling families
