= The Third Eye (1929 film) =

1929 film

- Directed by: Maclean Rogers
- Written by: Maclean Rogers; Sam Winston
- Produced by: Rudolph Salomon
- Starring: Dorothy Seacombe Hayford Hobbs; John F. Hamilton
- Production company: Graham-Wilcox Productions
- Distributed by: Graham-Wilcox Productions
- Release date: January 1929
- Running time: 7,200 feet
- Country: United Kingdom
- Languages: Silent; English intertitles

The Third Eye is a 1929 British silent crime film directed by Maclean Rogers and starring Dorothy Seacombe and Hayford Hobbs. The screenplay concerns a financier's plot to rob banks.

== Premise ==
As part of a plan to rob banks, a financier insists on installing new television technology in several branches.

== Cast ==
- Dorothy Seacombe as Marion Carstairs
- Ian Harding as Tom Kennedy
- Hayford Hobbs as Henry Fenton
- John F. Hamilton as Jim Carstairs
- Cameron Carr as Inspector
- Jean Jay as Flash Annie
- Beatrice Bell as Mrs. Carstairs
- Syd Ellery as Piggott
- Harry J. Worth as Commissioner Cosgrove
- Patrick Ludlow as Arthur Redfern
- Eric Wilton as Sir James Woodridge
