= A Sister to Assist 'Er (1930 film) =

1930 film

- Directed by: George Dewhurst
- Written by: George Dewhurst; John le Breton
- Based on: A Sister to Assist 'Er by John le Breton
- Produced by: Maurice Elvey; H. B. Parkinson
- Starring: Barbara Gott; Polly Emery; Donald Stuart; Alec Hunter
- Release date: 4 March 1930
- Running time: 64 minutes
- Country: United Kingdom
- Language: English

A Sister to Assist 'Er is a 1930 British comedy film directed by George Dewhurst and starring Barbara Gott, Polly Emery and Donald Stuart. It was based on the play A Sister to Assist 'Er by John le Breton.

== Cast ==
- Barbara Gott ... Mrs. May
- Polly Emery ... Mrs. McNash
- Donald Stuart ... Alf
- Muriel Aked ... Mrs. Crawley
- Mary Brough ... Mrs. May
- Alec Hunter ... Mr. McNash
- Charles Paton ... Thistlethwaite
- Maud Gill ... Miss Pilbeam
- Johnny Butt ... Sailor
