= Pillars of Society (disambiguation) =

The Pillars of Society is a play by Henrik Ibsen. It may also refer to the following films based on the play:

- Pillars of Society (1920 film), silent film
- Pillars of Society (1935 film), German film
