= Passion Island (film) =

1927 film

- Directed by: Manning Haynes
- Written by: W. W. Jacobs (novel); Lydia Hayward
- Produced by: G.A. Atkinson
- Starring: Lilian Oldland; Moore Marriott; Randle Ayrton; Walter Byron
- Cinematography: Percy Strong
- Production company: Film Manufacturing Company
- Distributed by: First National-Pathé Pictures
- Release date: May 1927
- Running time: 7,500
- Country: United Kingdom
- Language: English

Passion Island is a 1927 British silent drama film directed by Manning Haynes and starring Lilian Oldland, Moore Marriott and Randle Ayrton. It is based on a novel by W. W. Jacobs and concerns a vendetta on the island of Corsica.

== Cast ==
- Lilian Oldland - Josette Bernatti
- Moore Marriott - Beppo
- Randle Ayrton - Paolo Bernatti
- Walter Byron - Tony
- Dacia Deane - Santa
- Gladys Hamer - Clare
- Leal Douglas - Desirée
- Johnny Butt - Tomasco

== Bibliography ==
- Low, Rachael. History of the British Film, 1918-1929. George Allen & Unwin, 1971.
