= Leave It to Me (1930 film) =

1930 film

- A. Bromley Davenport, Joan Wyndham, Dorothy Seacombe, Robin Irvine and Tom Helmore in the film
- Directed by: George King
- Written by: Billie Bristow; Patrick L. Mannock
- Produced by: George King
- Starring: Robin Irvine; Dorothy Seacombe; A. Bromley Davenport
- Production company: George King Productions
- Distributed by: Fox Film Company
- Release date: October 1930
- Running time: 40 minutes
- Country: United Kingdom
- Language: English

Leave It to Me is a 1930 British short comedy film directed by George King and starring Robin Irvine, Dorothy Seacombe and A. Bromley Davenport. It was written by Billie Bristow and Patrick L. Mannock, and was made at Twickenham Studios as a quota quickie for Fox Film.

== Preservation status ==
The British Film Institute National Archive holds a collection of ephemera and stills but no film or video materials.

== Cast ==
- Robin Irvine as Larry
- Dorothy Seacombe as Mrs Jordan
- A. Bromley Davenport as Mr Jordan
- Harold Huth as Slade
- Joan Wyndham as Ann Jordan
- Frank Stanmore as Merton
- Tom Helmore as Tony
- Fanny Wright as housekeeper

== Reception ==
Film Weekly wrote: "This is a very slight comedy, lacking both punch and bright incidents, built around the fake burglary which Larry arranges in order to supply Merton with five thousand pounds he was promised to get for him. Slowness of development and too much dialogue prevent this picture from being really entertaining."

Kine Weekly wrote: "Conventional comedy, rather rambling in construction. ... Robin Irvine is quite good as Larry, but the best performance comes from A. Bromley Davenport as Jordan. ... The story is slight and the production is not slick enough to carry it over. There is too much aimless talking where fast action is what is required."

The Daily Film Renter wrote: "British picture of very light story texture, but handled effectively enough, in a comedy vein, to make it a useful second feature, and, as a Quota film, likely to be useful to most exhibitors. While it scarcely equals that decidedly bright first film, Too Many Crooks (to which it has a sort of distant family likeness), this George King effort has the merits of very fair incidental comedy and generally adequate acting."
