= Amy Walton =

Amy Walton may refer to:

- Amy and Emily Walton, child actress
- Amy Catherine Walton (1849–1939), English author
