= The Lucky Number =

1932 film

- Directed by: Anthony Asquith
- Written by: Anthony Asquith; Douglas Furber; Franz Schulz
- Produced by: Michael Balcon
- Starring: Clifford Mollison; Gordon Harker; Joan Wyndham
- Cinematography: Günther Krampf; Derick Williams
- Music by: Mischa Spoliansky
- Production company: Gainsborough Pictures
- Distributed by: Ideal Films
- Release date: 1 August 1933
- Running time: 72 minutes
- Country: United Kingdom
- Language: English

The Lucky Number (also known as Five and Six and A Kingdom for Five and Six) is a 1933 British sports comedy film directed by Anthony Asquith and starring Clifford Mollison, Gordon Harker, Joan Wyndham and Frank Pettingell. It was written by Asquith, Douglas Furber and Franz Schulz. A professional footballer attempts to recover a winning pools ticket.

== Plot ==
Footballer Percy Gibbs is jilted by his girl and goes to France, where he buys a lottery ticket. On his return he meets Winnie, a side-show girl, at a funfair, and has his wallet taken by a pickpocket. Unable to pay his pub bill, he hands the landlord the lottery ticket. When he later finds out it was the winning ticket, he and Winnie try to recover it, and the winnings. They discover that the lottery promoter has vanished with the prize money.

== Cast ==
- Clifford Mollison as Percy Gibbs
- Gordon Harker as a Hackney man
- Joan Wyndham as Winnie Sullivan
- Frank Pettingell as Mr Brown
- Joe Hayman as Mr MacDonald
- Hetty Hartley as Mrs MacDonald
- Esmé Percy as Chairman
- Hay Petrie as photographer
- Alfred Wellesley as pickpocket
- Wally Patch as bookmaker

== Production ==
The film was made by Gainsborough Pictures and shot at Islington and Welwyn Studios with sets designed by Alex Vetchinsky. The football scenes were filmed in and around Highbury Stadium in North London.

== Reception ==
Film Weekly wrote: "The film has flashes of real wit, some charm, and plenty of pace and verve."

Kine Weekly wrote: "The producer, Anthony Asquith, who has employed fantastic methods, reminiscent of Le Million, to achieve his effect, has studded the film with really bright ideas and follows his gags up cleverly. The balance between fantasy and fact is skilfully preserved, and out of the good story emerges drama, comedy, romance and sport, blended into first-class popular enfertainment through the sterling efforts of the good cast and resourceful direction."

The Daily Film Renter wrote: "Smart direction secures maximum effect from story material, while tuneful theme song is introduced naturally and with excellent results. Outstanding work from Gordon Harker and Clifford Mollison. Very good popular attraction.
