= Lawyer Quince =

Lawyer Quince may refer to:

- Lawyer Quince (short story), a short story by W. W. Jacobs
- Lawyer Quince (1914 film), a British film
- Lawyer Quince (1924 film), a British film
