= Children of Chance =

Children of Chance may refer to:

- Children of Chance (1930 film), a British crime film
- Children of Chance (1949 film), a British drama film
- Children of Chance, a 2017 film by Thierry Michel
