= Testimony (1920 film) =

1920 film

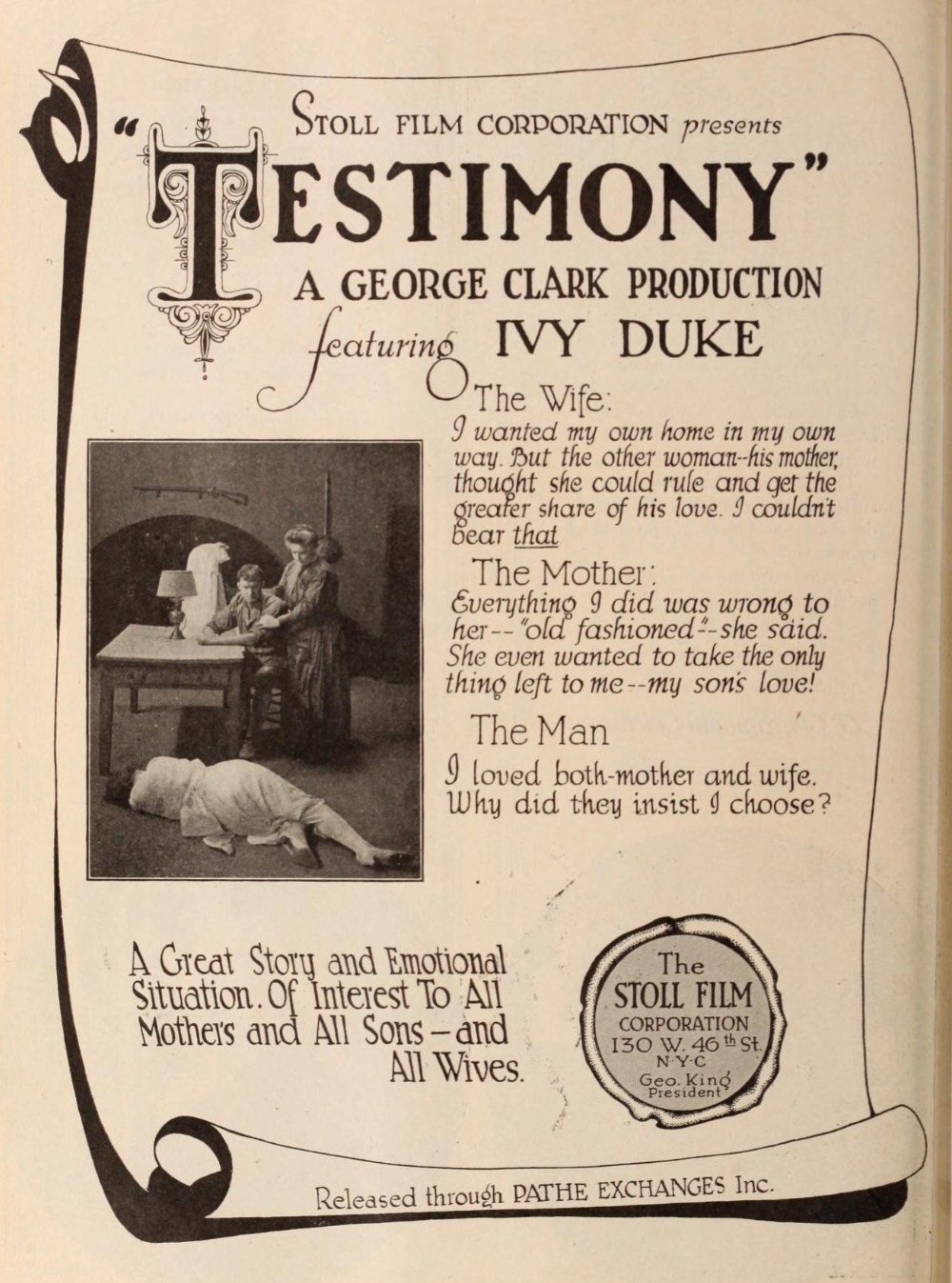
- Directed by: Guy Newall
- Written by: Alice Askew (novel); Claude Askew (novel); Guy Newall
- Produced by: George Clark
- Starring: Ivy Duke; David Hawthorne; Mary Rorke; Lawford Davidson
- Cinematography: Bert Ford
- Production company: George Clark Productions
- Distributed by: Stoll Pictures
- Release date: October 1920
- Running time: 7,189 feet
- Country: United Kingdom
- Languages: Silent; English intertitles

Testimony is a 1920 British silent drama film directed by Guy Newall and starring Ivy Duke, David Hawthorne and Mary Rorke. It was written by Newall based on the novel of the same title by Alice and Claude Askew.

== Plot ==
As summarized in a film publication, a farmer, Gilian Lyons, lives with his mother Rachel Lyons, who is tyrannical in her devotion to her son. Gilian braves his mother s anger and marries Althea May, who moves in with them. Rachel, who had been training Lucinda for eventual marriage to her son, vents her spleen against Althea. Gilian and Althea have a daughter who dies, and Rachel says this was because Althea did not take care of her. Althea leaves, lives with an uncle, and enters society, but she later decides to return home, as she still loves Gilian. However, Gilian has left the farm in search of her. After she becomes ill, Rachel takes care of Althea, and their relationship improves. Eventually Gilian returns home to find his wife waiting for him.

== Cast ==
- Ivy Duke as Althea May
- David Hawthorne as Gilian Lyons
- Lawford Davidson as Cecil Coram
- Mary Rorke as Rachel Lyons
- Douglas Munro as Reuben Curtis
- Marie Wright as Lizzie Emmett
- Barbara Everest as Lucinda
- Ruth Mackay as Lady Yetty

== Bibliography ==
- Low, Rachael. History of the British Film, 1918-1929. George Allen & Unwin, 1971. ISBN 978-0047910210
