= The Skipper's Wooing =

1922 film

- Directed by: Manning Haynes
- Written by: Lydia Hayward
- Produced by: George Redman
- Starring: Gordon Hopkirk; Cynthia Murtagh; Johnny Butt
- Production company: Artistic Pictures
- Distributed by: Artistic Pictures
- Release date: September 1922
- Country: United Kingdom
- Languages: Silent; English intertitles

The Skipper's Wooing is a 1922 British silent comedy film directed by Manning Haynes and starring Gordon Hopkirk, Cynthia Murtagh and Johnny Butt.

== Cast ==
- Gordon Hopkirk as The Skipper
- Cynthia Murtagh as Annie Getting
- Johnny Butt as Sam
- Thomas Marriott as Dick
- Bobbie Rudd as The Child
- Jeff Barlow as Mr. Dunn

== Bibliography ==
- Murphy, Robert. Directors in British and Irish Cinema: A Reference Companion. British Film Institute, 2006.
