= John Grant McKenzie =

Scottish minister, psychologist and academic.(1882–1963)

- Born: 5 February 1882; Aberdeen
- Died: 17 May 1963; Edinburgh
- Education: University of Aberdeen
- Occupations: Minister, psychologist, academic
- Children: Michael Howard

John Grant McKenzie (1882–1963) was a Scottish Congregational minister, psychologist and academic.

McKenzie was born in Aberdeen on 5 February 1882 and studied at the University of Aberdeen, winning the Dor Williams Divinity Scholarship in 1910. He became a Congregational pastor in Holywell Green Church, Halifax, in 1912, serving there until he moved in 1917 to Snow Hill in Wolverhampton where he was a pastor until 1921. He had been a delegate at the International Congregational Council in 1920.

In 1921, McKenzie was appointed the first Jesse Boot Professor of Sociology and Psychology at Paton Congregational College in Nottingham. He remained there for thirty years, retiring in 1951. According to his obituary in The Times, he was "a pioneer in the relationship of psychology and religion ... [who] helped many generations of theological students to understand the workings of the human mind".

McKenzie died on 17 May 1963 in Edinburgh. He had married Margaret Ann Murray in 1912 and had a son, the comedian Michael Howard, and a daughter, Dr Margaret Ross, who married Dr Frederic Laws and was mother to the judge Sir John Grant McKenzie Laws.
