= Aileen Despard =

Irish actress (1908–1981)

Aileen Despard was an actress, born on July 19, 1908, in Mullynure, County Armagh, Ireland. She died August 25, 1981, in Rushcliffe, Nottinghamshire, England, UK.

In 1930, the magazine Film Weekly sponsored a pair of film acting scholarships. The two winners (Cyril Butcher and Aileen Despard) went on to appear in the now lost Alfred Hitchcock short An Elastic Affair and placed under contract by British International Pictures.

== Selected filmography ==
- Double Dealing (1932) - Rosie
- Threads (1932) - Chloe
- Children of Chance (1930) - Beryl (as Eileen Despard)
- Such Is the Law (1930) - Minor Role (uncredited)
- Murder! (1930) - Edna Druce (uncredited)
- An Elastic Affair (Short) (1930) - The Girl
