= Leal Douglas =

English-Australian silent film actress (1881–1970)

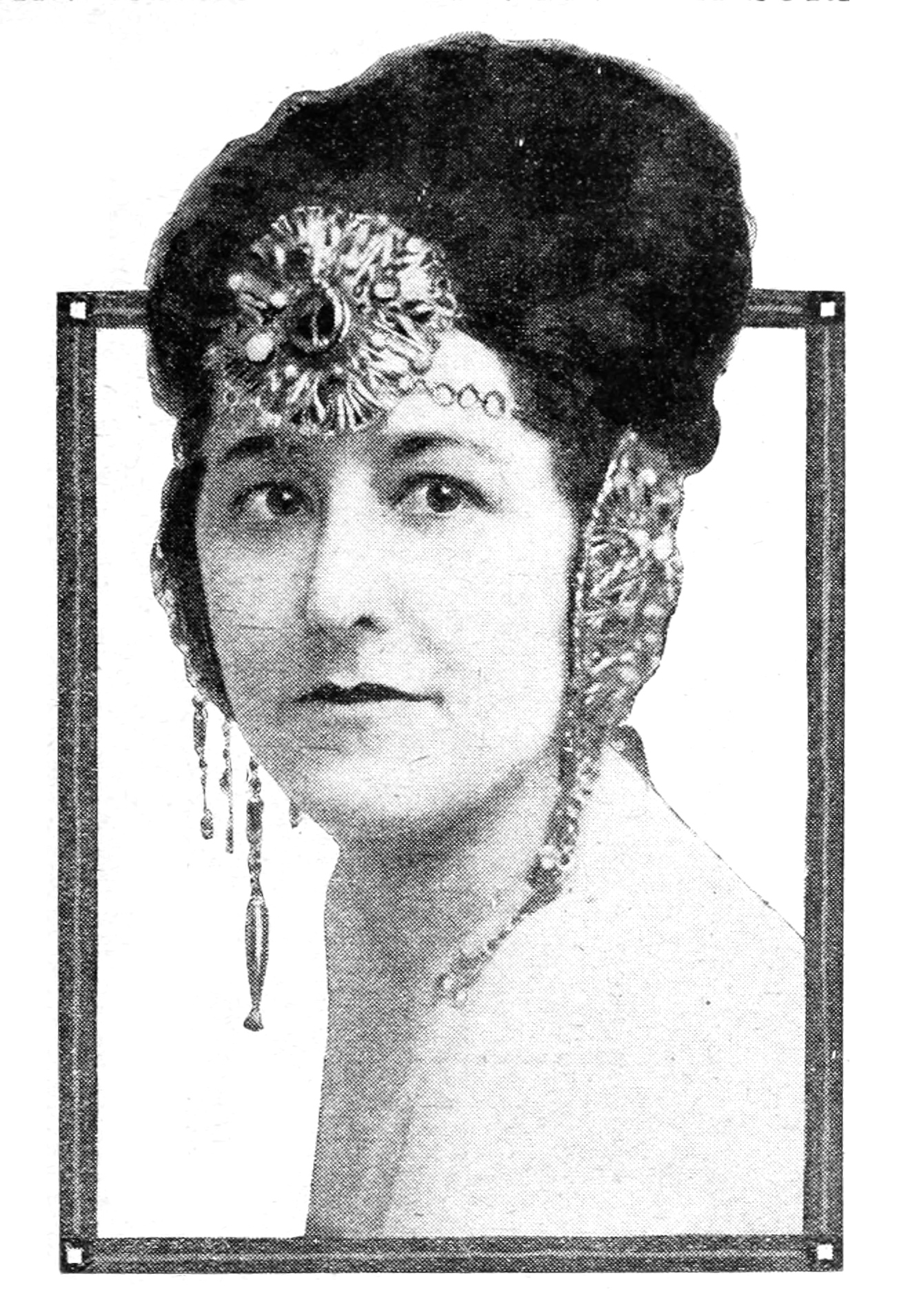
- Douglas, 1920
- Born: Lilly Elizabeth Annie Lamb; 25 March 1881; Eccles, Manchester, UK
- Died: 3 February 1970 (aged 88); London, UK
- Occupation: Actress

Leal Douglas (born Lilly Elizabeth Annie Lamb; 25 March 1881 – 3 February 1970) was a British-Australian actress, mainly of the silent film era.

Of Scottish and English parents, Douglas emigrated to Australia as a child and began her stage career there. She took her own company to South Africa, then returned to England for her main film career, during which she had some leading roles. In 1927, she went back to Australia, where she resumed her stage career, and then in the 1940s again returned to England.

== Life ==
Douglas was born in March 1881, the daughter of Mary Ann Emily and Richard Douglas Lamb, a musician originally from Scotland, the son of another Richard Lamb, also a musician. Her mother was from the village of Chalford in Gloucestershire, and her parents had been married in Salford in May 1880. In December 1881, their daughter was christened Lilly Elizabeth Annie at St Thomas's Church, Pendleton, in Eccles.

Douglas's family emigrated to Australia, where she spent most of her childhood, and on leaving school she became a stage actress. She adopted the stage name Leal Douglas and made her debut under the management of J. C. Williamson, one of her earliest appearances being as Barbara Hare in a George Marlow 1909 stage production of East Lynne. Other work was with Annette Kellerman and Julius Knight. In 1905, she and her parents were living in Oxley, Queensland, a suburb of Brisbane. On 11 October 1906, Douglas's parents announced her engagement to Frederick William Chapman, of Murphy's Creek, Churchill, Queensland, and on 24 October they were married. Her husband died in 1923 at the age of 47.

In December 1912, Douglas was touring with Aubrey Mallalieu in a piece called "Feed the Brute". After a long tour of Australia and New Zealand, she and Mallalieu formed a company of their own and took it to South Africa. While there, she saw that her friend Annette Kellerman was starring in a film, and wondered if one day they might appear together. In May 1913, Douglas and Mallalieu travelled together on the SS Ballarat to England, which in Douglas's view had at that time "world mastery of the film industry". On arrival in London, Douglas got an introduction to Florence Turner's manager and was given her first part in a film, The Rose of Surrey (1913). Her other early film work included Sixty Years a Queen (1913) and The Lure of London (1914).

In 1917, Douglas starred as Milady de Winter in a little-known film version of The Three Musketeers.

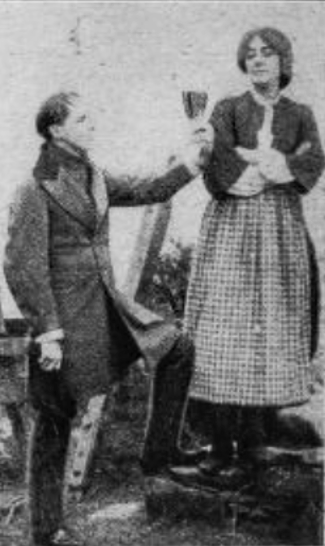
Douglas with Derwent Hall Caine in Darby and Joan (1920)

Another of Douglas's starring roles was in The Beetle (1919), based on the novel by Richard Marsh, in which she played an Egyptian princess who can transform herself into a man or a beetle and uses her powers to wreak revenge. A review commented "There are few vampires in the English screen world, and perhaps of these Miss Leal Douglas is the most beautiful." Jonathan Rigby has called Douglas's part in the film "the polymorphous title role".

In 1920, Picture Show reported that Douglas's eyes were dark brown and her height was 5 ft 7 in (170 cm), that she was an expert swimmer, was keen on riding, rowing, and golf, and had "brought the fashion for painted gloves into this country".

After appearing in British films for fourteen years, latterly as a character actress, in November 1927 Douglas returned to Brisbane by the Orient Line's RMS Ormonde, wishing to visit her family. She commented to the press that America had gained supremacy in films thanks to the war, and that England was now bidding to get it back, although hampered by "the insufficiency of studios", which were hired out for only three weeks. She had recently featured in a film made in Nice and Corsica and was an admirer of the German film Metropolis (1927).

In Australia, Douglas returned to working on stage, and appeared in several productions between 1928 and 1944. She also had parts in the Australian films The Cheaters (made 1929, released 1930), The Hayseeds (1933), The Silence of Dean Maitland (1934), and Harvest Gold (1945).

In 1932, Douglas was living in East Sydney, New South Wales, in 1937 in Wentworth, and in 1943 was in East Sydney again. Her father died in 1933, and her mother in 1937, in Sydney.

By 1949, Douglas was back in England and working on stage in a production of J. B. Priestley's The Linden Tree. She remained in Britain and had minor parts in films there in the early 1950s. She died in February 1970, aged 88, while living in Warwick Avenue, Little Venice, Maida Vale, London, and left an estate valued at £1,393 (equivalent to £27,200 in 2023).

== Filmography ==
- The Rose of Surrey (1913), as Mrs Moore
- Sixty Years a Queen (1913), uncredited
- The Lure of London (1914), as Lady Westbury
- Girl of My Heart (1915)
- The Three Musketeers (1917), as Milady de Winter
- Thelma (1918), as Blonde
- Deception (1918)
- What a Life! (1918), as Mrs Box
- Kiss Me! (1919), as Mrs Wick
- The Beetle (1919), as High Priestess
- The Lamp of Destiny (1919)
- Darby and Joan (1920), as Mrs Gorry
- Nothing Else Matters (1920), as Tiny Higgs
- Belphegor the Mountebank (1921), as Catherine
- The Uninvited Guest (1923), as Baines
- The Fair Maid of Perth (1923)
- Dixon's Return (1924), as Mrs Dixon
- The Gold Cure (1925), as Lady Dunacre
- London Love (1926), as Mrs Hope
- Every Mother's Son (1926), as Lady Browning
- Carry On (1927), as Mrs Trevorn
- Passion Island (1927), as Desirée
- Somewhat Good (1927)
- The Cheaters, as the Lady (1930)
- The Hayseeds (1933)
- The Silence of Dean Maitland (1934), as Mrs Lee
- Harvest Gold (1945), as Mrs McDougal
- Little Big Shot (1952)
- Johnny on the Run (1953)
