= Michael Howard (comedian) =

British actor and comedian (1916–1988)

- Born: 4 March 1916; Holywell Green, West Riding of Yorkshire, England
- Died: 18 February 1988 (aged 71); London, England
- Occupation(s): Actor and comedian
- Spouse(s): Betty Kelly (1938–19 ?, divorce); Peggy Evans (1949–1956, divorce); June Howard (?–1967, divorce)
- Children: 3

Michael Howard (4 March 1916 – 18 February 1988) was a British actor and comedian.

His parents were the Scottish Congregational minister, psychologist and academic John Grant McKenzie and Margaret Ann née Murray.

He trained at the Royal Academy of Dramatic Art and performed at various theatres in Britain and America. He became a resident comic at the Windmill Theatre in London in 1941.

He wrote and starred in a number of comedy shows for BBC Radio including For the Love of Mike, Leave it to the Boys, The Michael Howard Show and Here's Howard. The last was adapted for BBC Television and was transmitted from 14 March to 20 June 1951.

He married Betty Kelly in 1938, with whom he had one child, Harriet. They later divorced and in 1949 he married the actress Peggy Evans, with whom he had two children, Annabelle Howard and Ian Howard.

The 1956 'Picture Show Who's Who on the Screen' Annual gives, on Page 71, the following titles of Howard's then most recent "Films": I See a Dark Stranger; It Always Rains on Sunday; A Sister to Assist 'Er; Front Page Story; and, Out of the Clouds.

== Partial filmography ==
- A Canterbury Tale (1944)
- I See a Dark Stranger (1946)
- It Always Rains on Sunday (1947)
- A Sister to Assist 'Er (1948)
- Front Page Story (1954)
- Out of the Clouds (1955)
- The Baby and the Battleship (1956)
- Golden Rendezvous (1977)
