= The Yellow Mask =

1930 film

- Directed by: Harry Lachman
- Written by: George Arthurs; Harry Lachman (adaptation); Miles Malleson (dialogue); George Arthurs (dialogue); Walter C. Mycroft (adaptation)
- Screenplay by: Val Valentine
- Based on: play by Edgar Wallace
- Produced by: John Maxwell
- Starring: Lupino Lane; Dorothy Seacombe; Warwick Ward; Wilfred Temple
- Cinematography: Walter Blakeley; Claude Friese-Greene
- Edited by: Edward B. Jarvis
- Music by: John Reynders
- Production company: British International Pictures
- Distributed by: Wardour Films (UK)
- Release date: 30 July 1930
- Running time: 76 minutes
- Country: United Kingdom
- Language: English
- Budget: $100,000
- Box office: $300,000

The Yellow Mask is a 1930 British musical crime film directed by Harry Lachman and starring Lupino Lane, Dorothy Seacombe and Warwick Ward. A criminal plans to rob the Crown Jewels from the Tower of London. It was based on the 1927 Edgar Wallace novel The Traitor's Gate., adapted into the play The Yellow Mask, which premiered in London in 1928.

== Cast ==
- Lupino Lane as Sam Slipper
- Dorothy Seacombe as Mary Trayne
- Warwick Ward as Li San
- Haddon Mason as Ralph Carn
- Wilfred Temple as John Carn
- Frank Cochrane as Ah-Song
- Wallace Lupino as Steward
- Bill Shine (actor) as Sunshine
- Winnie Collins as Molly

== Reception ==
Daily Telegraph wrote, "provides an hour's ideal entertainment"; and the Sunday Pictorial called it, "packed with every known ingredient of popularity." The New York Times wrote, "in a prologue to the film it is set forth that Mr. Wallace has attempted a daring and original combination of melodrama and musical comedy in a manner to end all musical melodramas forever. In all likelihood these designations were put upon The Yellow Mask after it had emerged from the studio, in a hasty effort to give this hodge-podge a meaning."
