= Dinah Shurey =

British film producer and director (1888–1963)

- Born: Dorothy Shurey; 17 June 1888
- Died: 1963 (aged 74–75); Dorset
- Occupation: Film producer
- Years active: 1923–1932

Dinah Shurey (17 June 1888 – 1963) was a British film producer and director of the late 1920s. She is most famously known for her 1929 film The Last Post. Additional credits to her name include Afraid of Love (1925), Second to None (1926), Every Mother's Son (1926), Carry On (1927). Shurey often calls upon themes surrounding the British war within her films, tending to take on a more melodramatic narrative style.

== Early life ==
Shurey was born in 1888 into a comfortable middle-class family; her father Harry was a magazine and penny paper publisher. Some of Edgar Wallace's Sanders of the River stories first appeared in Harry Shurey's magazine The Weekly Tale Teller which was published from 8 May 1909 to 29 April 1916 (365 issues).

During World War I, Dinah Shurey worked for the French Red Cross as a canteen worker. Due to overexertion, Shurey was dismissed from duty and sent home. She later worked with actor-manager Lena Ashwell to organise concerts for troops on the Western Front. After the war, Shurey managed the acting couple Eva Moore and Henry V. Esmond.

== Film career ==
Shurey's film career began with Teddington Film Company, for which she worked in a number of roles, graduating to assistant film director.

In May 1924, Shurey founded her own film production company, Britannia Films and in 1929 her own distribution company Showman Films. Shurey was the only female British film director of her day. Britannia made five films, two of which, Carry On and The Last Post Shurey directed herself.

Her wartime experiences instilled in Shurey a fascination for melodramatic and militaristic British experiences, which scholar Bibi Berki states foreshadowed the majority of her filmography, including films such as Carry On! and The Last Post. Berki further suggests that it was for her films Second to None and Carry On!, which both deal with the military experience within the First World War, that Shurey borrowed warships from the British military.

According to Berki, Shurey's dedication to her filming process was expressed in her interview with Banbury Advertiser in 1927, in which she described the making of Second to None. She was forced, as the producer, to lower not only herself down through a manhole but also her entire crew with their equipment :

You can imagine our difficulties, getting all our lighting equipment, with yards and yards of cables, down there. The heat of course was unbearable and it was only practical to work for very limited periods.

=== The Last Post (1929) ===
For her second venture into directing Shurey co-wrote with Lydia Hayward, who was a consistent collaborator on Shurey's films. The Last Post is often cited by critics as Shurey's most controversial film. The film describes the story of twin brothers during the First World War who get wrapped up with the Bolshevik General Strike while both pursuing the same woman. Her intention was to produce a film that commented on the British war sentiment during the First World War.

== Court case ==
While Shurey's films were generally well received by the public, critics were less certain, which gained the attention of Nerina Shute, a columnist for Film Weekly. On June 10, 1929 Film Weekly published an article titled “Can Women Direct Films? A Decided Negative From A Woman Who Knows.” The article stated:

It is pathetically obvious that women can’t produce films. In England only one lady has had the temerity to try. Dinah Shurey (who will go to heaven by reason of her great courage) has created several appalling pictures. Critics have bowed with sad courtesy to the gentle creator of such films as The Last Post. They cannot fail to admire her good intentions, and yet … In America the situation is very nearly as distressing. There are perhaps three women directors in existence, but no one of them has made an outstanding picture. What then is the reason?

The article raised questions as to whether or not women could successfully create a film that held the same standard as men, arguing that, using Shurey's filmography, women could not.

Shurey suggested she write a piece in Film Weekly as a direct response to her critics titled, “Women Can Direct Films - From a Woman Who Knows.” Its publishers refused permission to name Shute directly, and Shurey's decided to take legal action on the High Court. In February 1931, Shurey sued Film Weekly for libel, arguing that the article stated that her work was without value and that women could not produce a film. Film Weekly disagreed, arguing they were entitled to their opinion, and that their conclusions were proved through the viewing of her films. The jury awarded Shurey £500 in damages.

No prints of The Last Post are known to survive and the film is one of the top ten films on the British Film Institute's most wanted list of lost British films.

Paul Rotha compared Shurey to Harry Bruce Woolfe, calling her "an upstanding Empire loyalist" who "had made some quite atrocious films".

== Filmography ==
- Afraid of Love (1925)
- Second to None (1926)
- Every Mother's Son (1926)
- Carry On (1927)
- The Last Post (1929)
