= Dixon's Return =

1924 British film by Manning Haynes

- Directed by: Manning Haynes
- Written by: W. W. Jacobs (story); Lydia Hayward
- Produced by: George Redman
- Starring: Moore Marriott; Leal Douglas; Tom Coventry
- Production company: Artistic Pictures
- Distributed by: Artistic Pictures
- Release date: January 1924
- Country: United Kingdom
- Languages: Silent; English intertitles

Dixon's Return is a 1924 British silent comedy film directed by Manning Haynes and starring Moore Marriott, Leal Douglas and Tom Coventry.

== Cast ==
- Moore Marriott as Bob Dixon
- Leal Douglas as Mrs. Dixon
- Tom Coventry as Uncle
- Harry Ashton as Night Watchman
- Bob Vallis
- J. Edwards Barker
- Toby Cooper

== Bibliography ==
- Murphy, Robert. Directors in British and Irish Cinema: A Reference Companion. British Film Institute, 2006.
