= An Elastic Affair =

Lost 1930 short film by Alfred Hitchcock

- Directed by: Alfred Hitchcock
- Release date: 1930
- Country: United Kingdom

An Elastic Affair (1930) is a 10-minute short comedy film directed by Alfred Hitchcock which features the two winners—Cyril Butcher (1909–1987) as "the Boy" and Aileen Despard (1908–1981) as "the Girl"—of a film acting scholarship sponsored by British film magazine Film Weekly.

The film was shown on 19 January 1930 at a ceremony at the London Palladium at which the two winners were presented with their award, in the form of movie contracts with the film producer John Maxwell of British International Pictures. It is now considered a lost film.

== See also ==
- List of lost films
