= Out of the Clouds =

1955 British film by Basil Dearden

- Directed by: Basil Dearden
- Screenplay by: John Eldridge; Michael Relph
- Based on: The Springboard (novel) by John Fores
- Produced by: Michael Relph; Eric Williams
- Starring: Anthony Steel; Robert Beatty; James Robertson Justice
- Cinematography: Paul Beeson
- Edited by: Jack Harris
- Music by: Richard Addinsell
- Production company: Ealing Studios
- Distributed by: General Film Distributors
- Release date: 14 February 1955 (UK)
- Running time: 88 minutes
- Country: United Kingdom
- Language: English

Out of the Clouds is a 1955 British drama film directed by Basil Dearden and starring Anthony Steel, Robert Beatty and James Robertson Justice. It was loosely based on the novel The Springboard by John Fores and was adapted by Rex Rienits, with a screenplay by Michael Relph and John Eldridge.

An Ealing Studios production, the film is composed of small stories dealing with the passengers and crew on a day at London Airport (the name of Heathrow Airport 1946–1966).

== Plot ==
During a day at an airport in London, many complications arise, involving both passengers and airline crew members. Pilot Gus Randall is a compulsive gambler who is caught up in a smuggling ring as well as a love triangle; Nick Millbourne is the chief duty officer who wants to get back in the sky and vies with Gus for the attention of stewardess Penny Henson and passengers Bill Steiner and German Leah Rosch cross paths on opposite journeys; after their flights are grounded by bad weather, they fall in love. Nick and Penny also find happiness together.

== Cast ==
- Anthony Steel as Gus Randall
- Robert Beatty as Nick Millbourne
- David Knight as Bill Steiner
- Margo Lorenz as Leah Rosch
- James Robertson Justice as Captain Brent
- Eunice Gayson as Penny Henson
- Isabel Dean as Mrs Malcolm
- Gordon Harker as taxi driver
- Bernard Lee as customs officer
- Michael Howard as Purvis
- Marie Lohr as wealthy lady
- Esma Cannon as lady's companion
- Abraham Sofaer as Indian man
- Melissa Stribling as Jean Osmond
- Sid James as gambler
- Barbara Leake as the gambler's wife
- Megs Jenkins as the landlady
- Harold Kasket as Hafadi
- Jack Lambert as chief engineer
- Cyril Luckham as the doctor
- Nicholas Phipps as Hilton-Davidson
- Terence Alexander as duty room radio operator
- Charles Farrell as Perce
- Lloyd Lamble as Ben Saunders
- William Franklyn as control tower radio operator
- Katie Johnson as worried passenger

== Production ==
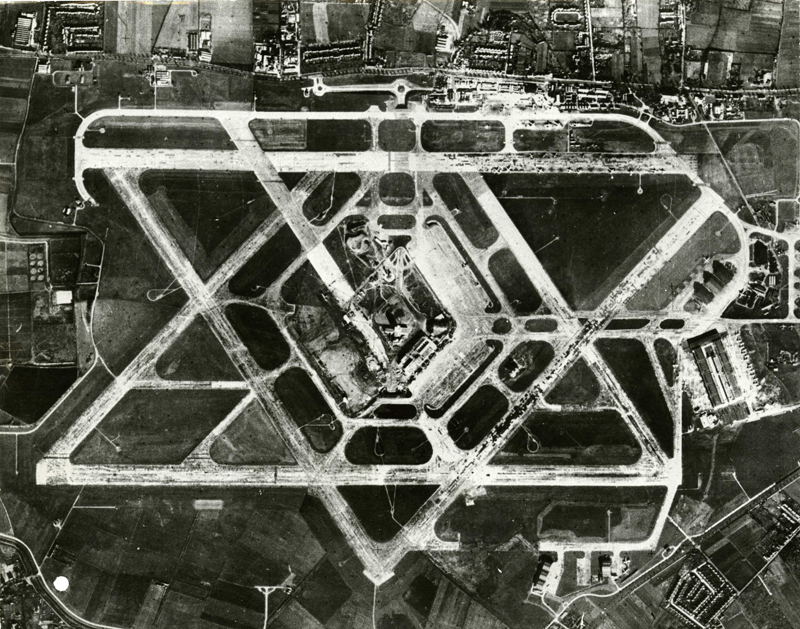
London's Heathrow Airport was also a "star" in Out of the Clouds.

The film was based on a novel The Springboard by John Fores which was not published until 1956. The Daily Telegraph called the book "a vivid documentary" with "a dull central character."

The film marked a change of pace for Anthony Steel, who was typically cast in war films.

The Ministry of Transport and Civil Aviation co-operated in the production of the film. Technical assistance was provided by BOAC, British European Airways and Pan-American World Airways. Principal photography at London Airport started in early June 1954 with a temporary production office set up at the airport.

The film used one of Ealing Studios' largest ever sets to create the interior of the terminal building. An exact replica set of the Heathrow visual control room (air traffic control tower cab) was also built, as filming at the actual location was impractical.

== Release ==
Out of the Clouds premiered at the Leicester Square Theatre in London on 14 February 1955. It opened in the United States two years later, on 31 July 1957.

== Reception ==
The Monthly Film Bulletin wrote: "Out of the Clouds tollows a pattern familiar in the British cinema – the attempt to keep two or three dramatic stories running concurrently against a background recorded in almost documentary detail. Only one of the stories, that of Leah and Bill, here develops any major significance .... The love story serves to give the film a dramatic centre, but the observation of character keeps mainly to the surface, and the playing of David Knight and Margo Lorenz is not sufficiently experienced to give the airport romance much conviction. The film, though, continually deserts the centre for the periphery. ...The film relies considerably on small-part players and marginal incidents; the detail, however, never looks like adding up to a satisfactory whole."

Variety called it "good average entertainment."

Film historian George Perry describes the film in his 1991 book Forever Ealing as:

Snother of Ealing's attempts at a behind the scenes approach – this time an anatomy of London Airport, a much smaller community in the mid-Fifties than now. Compared with Arthur Hailey's treatment of the same formula in the Sixties in his novel Airport, the result is remarkably tame. As is usual in such Ealing pictures, and in this one more than most, the background and setting are more interesting than the foreground characters, and Paul Beeson's EastmanColour photography provides a fascinating record of how Heathrow looked in its early days. The script... is larded with the customary parade of minor characters — a comic cab driver, a difficult passenger and so on — but so much of the original spirit has by this time deserted Ealing that the peripheral action, far from filling out a rich tapestry of incident, is merely a tiresome diversion from the main thread of the narrative.

The authors of the 2009 book The Cinema of Basil Dearden and Michael Relph conclude that the film's background and its setting are more interesting than its characters.

Film historian Charles Barr describes the film as "an acquired value as a period piece" in his 1998 book Ealing Studios.

The US edition of TV Guide writes that, "it has the feel of a soap opera crossed with a documentary."

Leonard Maltin wrote: "Work and play among commercial pilots; nothing special."

== Home media ==
In re-release, Out of the Clouds is the last disc in Ealing Classics 2009, Volume 1.

A restored version, with eight minutes of footage reinserted, was shown on Talking Pictures TV from 2019. The restored scenes can be distinguished by their faded colour.
