= The Fortunate Fool =

1933 film

- Opening titles
- Directed by: Norman Walker
- Written by: Dion Titheradge
- Produced by: Jack Eppel
- Starring: Hugh Wakefield; Joan Wyndham; Jack Raine
- Cinematography: Alan Lawson
- Edited by: David Lean
- Production company: Jack Eppel Productions
- Distributed by: Associated British Film Distributors
- Release date: 1933
- Running time: 73 minutes
- Country: United Kingdom
- Language: English

The Fortunate Fool is a 1933 British comedy film directed by Norman Walker and starring Hugh Wakefield, Joan Wyndham and Jack Raine. It was written by Dion Titheradge from his play.

== Plot ==
Searching for inspiration among the homeless people on the London Embankment, a prosperous writer brings a young woman and a former prizefighter back to his home. A romance soon blossoms between the author and the girl, until she discovers he has been hiding his true wealth and status. Her departure is further complicated when the author's spiteful relatives falsely accuse her of stealing a priceless miniature. The truth eventually comes out, leading to a happy ending.

== Cast ==
- Hugh Wakefield as Jim Falconer
- Joan Wyndham as Helen
- Jack Raine credited as Jack Raines as Gerald
- Elizabeth Jenns as Mildred
- Arthur Chesney as Batty
- Sara Allgood as Rose
- Bobbie Comber as Marlowe
- Mary Mayfren as Mrs Falconer

== Production ==
The film was made at Ealing Studios as a quota quickie, edited by David Lean. The sets were by the art director Wilfred Shingleton.

== Reception ==
Kine Weekly wrote: "A simple intriguing quixotic tale ...The atmosphere is good, tasteful interiors, and convincing exteriors adding to the quiet pleasures of the film. Acceptable two-feature programme booking for all classes."

The Daily Film Renter wrote: "Effectively mounted and narrated, with amusingly human performance by Hugh Wakefield. Arthur Chesney outstandingly good as down-and-out ex-bruiser. Film slow at times, but with its touches of humour should do quite in popular halls."

Picture Show wrote: "Quite entertaining mixture of comedy and drama ... Hugh Wakefield's urbane, humorous personality is given excellent scope, and he is well backed by the cast. Well told and photographed."

Picturegoer wrote: "Too much dialogue and slow development militate against wholly satisfactory entertainment in spite of some pleasing sentiment and a good human touch here and there."
