= Headin' for God's Country =

1943 film by William Morgan

- Theatrical release poster
- Directed by: William Morgan
- Screenplay by: Houston Branch; Elizabeth Meehan
- Story by: Houston Branch
- Produced by: Armand Schaefer
- Starring: William Lundigan; Virginia Dale; Harry Davenport; Harry Shannon; Addison Richards; John F. Hamilton
- Cinematography: Bud Thackery
- Edited by: Arthur Roberts
- Music by: Mort Glickman; Marlin Skiles
- Production company: Republic Pictures
- Distributed by: Republic Pictures
- Release date: August 26, 1943
- Running time: 78 minutes
- Country: United States
- Language: English

Headin' for God's Country is a 1943 American action film directed by William Morgan and written by Houston Branch and Elizabeth Meehan. The film stars William Lundigan, Virginia Dale, Harry Davenport, Harry Shannon, Addison Richards and John F. Hamilton. The film was released on August 26, 1943, by Republic Pictures.

== Cast ==
- William Lundigan as Michael Banyan
- Virginia Dale as Laurie Lane
- Harry Davenport as Clem Adams
- Harry Shannon as Albert Ness
- Addison Richards as District Commissioner
- John F. Hamilton as Hilary Higgins
- Eddie Acuff as Hugo Higgins
- Wade Crosby as Jim Talbot
- Skelton Knaggs as Jeff
- John Bleifer as Nickolai
- Eddy Waller as Hank
- Charles Lung as Willie Soba
- Ernie Adams as Chuck
- Eddie Lee as Gim Lung
- James B. Leong as Japanese Officer
- Anna Q. Nilsson as Mrs. Nilsson
- Ace the Wonder Dog as Flash
