= Thou Fool =

1926 film directed by Fred Paul

Thou Fool is a 1928 British silent drama film directed by Fred Paul and starring Stewart Rome, Marjorie Hume and Mary Rorke. Anthony Asquith worked on the film as an assistant director.

== Cast ==
- Stewart Rome as Robert Barker
- Marjorie Hume as Elsie Glen
- Mary Rorke as Ldy MacDonald
- J. Fisher White as James Scobie
- Wyndham Guise as Duncan Glen
- Mickey Brantford as Robert as a Child
- Darby Foster as Harry Clement
- Patrick Aherne as Undetermined Role
