= A Peep Behind the Scenes (1918 film) =

1918 film

- Directed by: Kenelm Foss; Geoffrey H. Malins
- Written by: O.F. Walton (novel); Kenelm Foss
- Produced by: Low Warren
- Starring: Ivy Close; Gerald Ames; Gertrude Bain
- Production company: Master Films
- Release date: December 1918
- Country: United Kingdom
- Languages: Silent; English intertitles

A Peep Behind the Scenes is a 1918 British silent drama film directed by Kenelm Foss and Geoffrey H. Malins and starring Ivy Close, Gerald Ames and Gertrude Bain. It is an adaptation of the 1877 novel of the same name set around a travelling fair.

== Cast ==
- Ivy Close as Norah Joyce
- Gerald Ames as Augustus Joyce
- Gertrude Bain as Lucy Leslie
- Vera Bryer as Rosalie Joyce
- Kenneth Gore as Toby Charlton
- E. Blackton as Mother Manikin
