= The Rest Cure (film) =

1923 film

- Directed by: A. E. Coleby
- Written by: George Robey (novel); A. E. Coleby
- Starring: George Robey; Sydney Fairbrother; Gladys Hamer
- Production company: Stoll Pictures
- Distributed by: Stoll Pictures
- Release date: October 1923
- Country: United Kingdom
- Languages: Silent; English intertitles

The Rest Cure is a 1923 British silent comedy film directed by A. E. Coleby and starring George Robey, Sydney Fairbrother and Gladys Hamer.

== Cast ==
- George Robey as George
- Sydney Fairbrother as Mrs. George
- Gladys Hamer as The Maid
- Bertie Wright as The Idiot
- Harry Preston as The Squire
- Bob Reed as The Vicar
- Mickey Brantford as The Boy
- Joan Whalley as The Girl
- Minna Leslie as The Friend
- George Bishop as The Cabman
- Raymond Ellis as The Landlord

== Bibliography ==
- Goble, Alan. The Complete Index to Literary Sources in Film. Walter de Gruyter, 1999.
- Low, Rachael. The History of the British Film 1918-1929. George Allen & Unwin, 1971.
