= The Harbour Lights (1923 film) =

1923 film

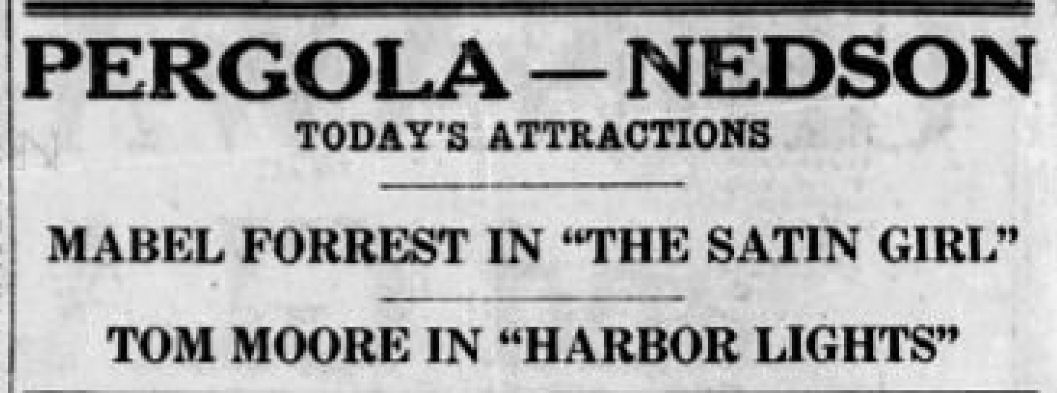
- American newspaper advert
- Directed by: Tom Terriss
- Written by: Eliot Stannard
- Based on: The Harbour Lights by George R. Sims
- Starring: Tom Moore; Isobel Elsom; Gerald McCarthy; Gibson Gowland
- Production company: Ideal Film Company
- Distributed by: Ideal Film Company
- Release date: 1923
- Running time: 60 minutes
- Country: United Kingdom
- Language: Silent (English intertitles)

The Harbour Lights is a 1923 British silent drama film directed by Tom Terriss and starring Tom Moore, Isobel Elsom, and Gerald McCarthy. It was based on a popular Victorian melodramatic play The Harbour Lights by George R. Sims (originally starring Terriss's father, William Terriss), which had previously been made into a film in 1914.

== Cast ==
- Tom Moore as Lieutenant David Kingsley
- Isobel Elsom as Dora Nelson
- Gerald McCarthy as Frank Morland
- Gibson Gowland as Mark Helstone
- Annette Benson as Lina Nelson
- A. B. Imeson as Inspector Wood
- Percy Standing as Nicholson
- Mary Rorke as Mrs. Helstone
- Judd Green as Old Tom
- Gordon Begg as Captain Nelson
