= Cyril Butcher =

English actor & director (1909–1987)

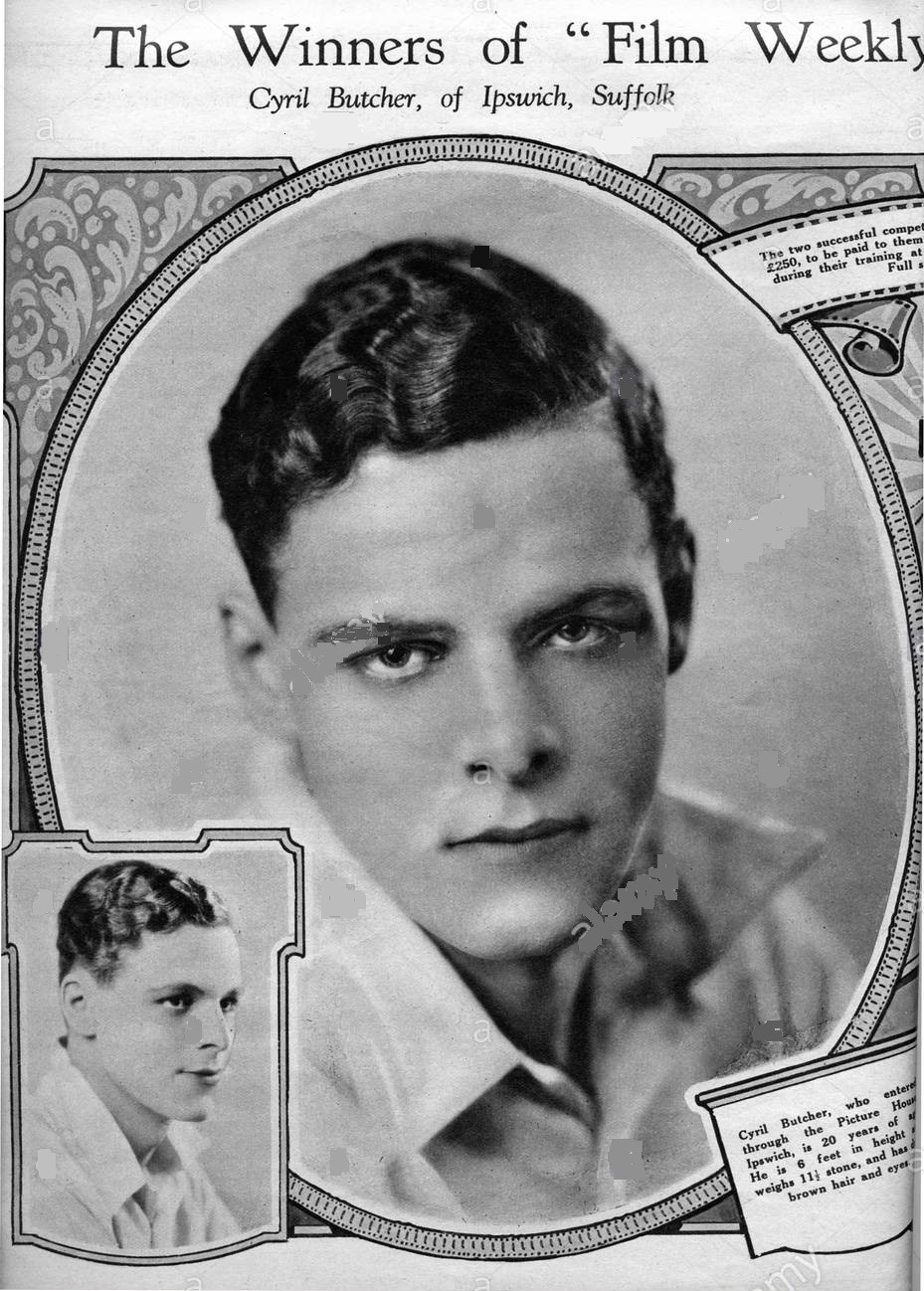
Cyril Butcher aged 20

Cyril George Butcher (31 July 1909 – 23 February 1987) was an English actor and director and longtime companion of Beverley Nichols.

== Biography ==
Butcher was born on 31 July 1909, in Suffolk, England.

In 1930, the magazine Film Weekly sponsored a pair of film acting scholarships. The two winners (Cyril Butcher and Aileen Despard) went on to appear in the now lost Alfred Hitchcock short An Elastic Affair and placed under contract by British International Pictures.

In the early 1930s, he met novelist and playwright Beverley Nichols and they remained lifelong partners from then. Their friends were Hugh Walpole and Lord Berners, among others. In 1939 Butcher was living with Nichols and a valet at 1 Ellerdale Close, Hampstead, London.

In 1934, he published In Extremis, Worst Moments in the Lives of the Famous with a foreword by Beverley Nichols. In 1939, together with Albert Arlen, he directed the play Counterfeit! at the Duke of York's, London.

In 1953, Butcher adapted Evensong by Beverley Nichols for the television, while in 1956 he directed the television adaptation of Macadam and Eve from the play by Roger Macdougall. Butcher was the producer of the 1957 television drama Granite Peak.

Between 1959 and 1963, he directed for television: Ideal Home Exhibition (1963), The English Captain (1960), The Last Hours (1959), Old People; Part 1 (1959) and Election Results 1959 (1959).

Butcher and Nichols shared a home together – Sudbrook Cottage at Ham Common in Richmond, Surrey. On Nichols' death in 1984, Butcher was the main beneficiary in his will, amounting to £131,750 (£429,114 in 2025 sterling). Butcher died Sudbrook Cottage on 23 February 1987, aged 77.
