= London Love =

1926 film

London Love is a 1926 British silent drama film directed by H. Manning Haynes and starring Fay Compton, John Stuart and Miles Mander. It was an adaptation of the novel Whirlpool by Arthur Applin. The screenplay concerns a young woman who becomes a film star in order to raise enough money to pay for her boyfriend's legal defence in a murder trial.

== Cast ==
- Fay Compton as Sally Hope
- John Stuart as Harry Raymond
- Miles Mander as Sir James Daring
- Moore Marriott c Aaron Levinsky
- A.B. Imeson as Henry Worlock
- Humberston Wright as Sir Philip Brown
- Leal Douglas as Mrs. Hope
- Arthur Walcott as Bersault
- Grace Vicat as Mrs. James
- Laura Walker as Anna
