= The Loves of Robert Burns =

1930 film

- Directed by: Herbert Wilcox
- Written by: Reginald Berkeley; Maclean Rogers; Herbert Wilcox
- Based on: a story by Reginald Berkeley & Herbert Wilcox
- Produced by: Herbert Wilcox
- Starring: Joseph Hislop; Dorothy Seacombe; Eve Gray
- Cinematography: David Kesson; Freddie Young
- Edited by: Duncan Mansfield
- Music by: Leslie Heward (music arranger / musical director)
- Production company: British & Dominions Film Corporation
- Distributed by: Ideal (UK) (theatrical) (as Ideal Films Ltd.); Woolf & Freedman Film Service (UK)
- Release dates: 3 March 1930 (London, England)
- Running time: 96 minutes
- Country: England
- Language: English

The Loves of Robert Burns is a 1930 British historical musical film directed by Herbert Wilcox and starring Joseph Hislop, Dorothy Seacombe and Eve Gray. It depicts the life of the Scottish poet Robert Burns.

== Cast ==
- Joseph Hislop ... Robert Burns
- Dorothy Seacombe ... Jean Armour
- Eve Gray ... Mary Campbell
- Nancy Price ... Posie Nancy
- Jean Cadell ... Mrs. Burns
- C. V. France ... Lord Farquhar
- Neil Kenyon ... Tam the Tinkler
- George Baker ... Soldier
- Harold Saxon-Snell ... Gavin Hamilton
- Craighall Sherry ... James Armour
- Wilfred Shine ... Sailor

== Production ==
The film was the first joint production between Herbert Wilcox Productions, and His Master's Voice gramophone company. The aim of this was to give Wilcox access to their celebrity recording stars such as Chaliapin, John McCormick, Galli-Curci, Yehudi Menuhin and others. For the lead he cast the Scottish tenor Joseph Hislop.

== Reception ==
Wilcox later wrote it was "a good film, I thought, but not commercially successful" which led to the gramophone company ending the relationship with Wilcox. "Had I chosen a less indigenous subject and a greater name star, the story might have been vastly different," wrote Wlcox.

=== Critical reception ===
The New York Times wrote, "another film which was manufactured with a particular eye to American consumption has on its showing here fallen far short of standards set by British critics...It was thought that the story of the Scottish poet whose fame has been spread throughout the world by his fervently admiring countrymen would command a certain amount of universal appeal. An undoubted opportunity has been missed in that respect. Joseph Hislop, a well-known and popular tenor, was selected for the rôle of the poet, and he does his part, so far as the rendering of a series of Burns's famous songs is concerned, as well as could be desired. On the other hand, the photographic work is much below the standard and the character of Bobbie is divested of most of those qualities which endeared him to his readers as a man as his verse commended him to them as a poet. "The Loves of Robert Burns," indeed, was so unsatisfactory to the London public that it was withdrawn at the end of one week's trial at a central cinema, although it had been largely advertised in advance. Herbert Wilcox was the producer and apparently he fell between two stools—that of finding a singer who could do justice to Bobbie Burns's "Comin' Through the Rye" and other equally famous ballads, and an actor who could present an adequate picture of Robbie the man"; and more recently, TV Guide called it a "poorly produced life of the famed writer that is short on fact and long on fancy. Hislop, a noted operatic tenor, is about the best thing the film has going. He gives a fairly good performance and handles the songs well. However the script is a joke. Though the title implies that several affairs will be dealt with, in reality there are only two. Gray and Seacombe are Hislop's two lovers, both historically inaccurate. The film shows Seacombe being seduced and being made into "an honest woman" by Burns, when in reality they married and had several children. This story gives them no family at all. The Scottish settings are used nicely, but the actors keep forgetting what country they are in and their accents change from scene to scene. Better to buy an anthology of Burns' work than to deal with the mess here."
