= Mickey Brantford =

English actor (1911–1984)

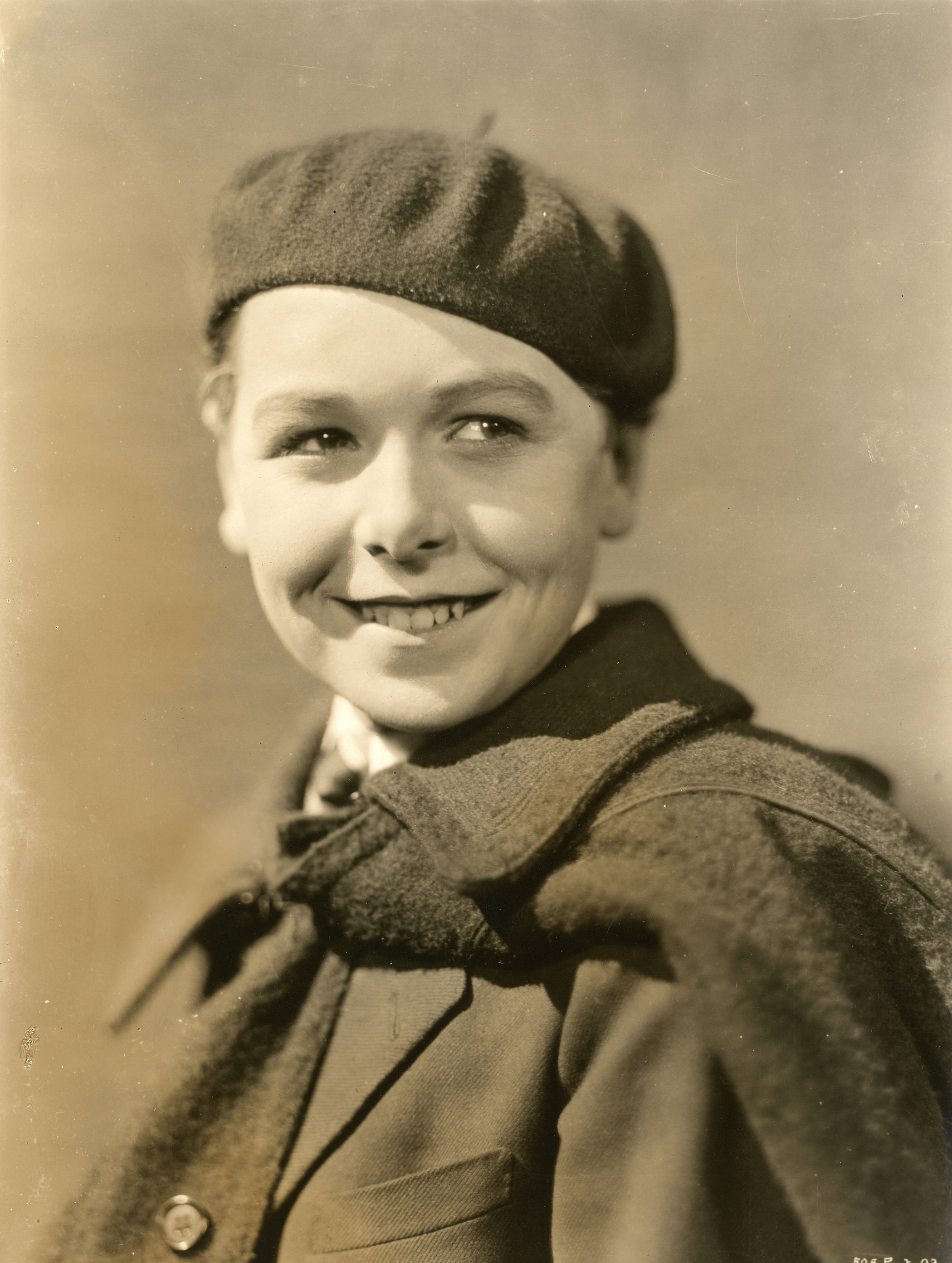
- Born: Michael Richard Henry Comerford; 26 March 1911; London, England
- Died: 18 October 1984 (aged 73); Buckinghamshire, England
- Occupations: Actor & production manager

Mickey Brantford (26 March 1911 – 18 October 1984) was an English actor and film production manager .

Mickey Brantford was born Michael Richard Henry Comerford into a theatrical family, in London. He began his career in the silent film era as a popular child actor, and appeared in a series of Sexton Blake shorts as the detective's assistant, Tinker.

== Selected filmography ==
- A Man the Army Made (1917)
- The Game of Life (1922)
- The Sporting Instinct (1922)
- The Knockout (1923)
- This Freedom (1923)
- The Rest Cure (1923)
- Not for Sale (1924)
- Afraid of Love (1925)
- Thou Fool (1926)
- ‘’Mare Nostrum’’ (1926)
- Second to None (1927)
- Carry On (1927)
- The Rolling Road (1927)
- Dawn (1928)
- The Burgomaster of Stilemonde (1929)
- Suspense (1930)
- The Stolen Necklace (1933)
- Temptation (1934)
- My Old Dutch (1934)
- Me and Marlborough (1935)
- The Phantom Light (1935)
- My Heart Is Calling (1935)
- Strictly Illegal (1935)
- Twice Branded (1936)
- The Last Journey (1936)
- Where There's a Will (1936)
- Darby and Joan (1937)
- The Reverse Be My Lot (1937)

== Bibliography ==
- Holmstrom, John. The Moving Picture Boy: An International Encyclopaedia from 1895 to 1995, Norwich, Michael Russell, 1996, p. 48.
