= Craighall Sherry =

British actor (1869–1943)

- Born: April 8, 1869; Glasgow, Scotland
- Died: 1943 (aged 73–74); Uxbridge, Middlesex, United Kingdom
- Years active: 1927-1939

Craighall Sherry (April 8, 1869 – 1943) was a British stage and film actor.

== Selected filmography ==
- The Battles of Coronel and Falkland Islands (1927)
- Spione (1928)
- Number 17 (1928)
- The Informer (1929)
- The Loves of Robert Burns (1930)
- Nell Gwyn (1934)
- Royal Cavalcade (1935)
- The Anatomist (1939)

== Bibliography ==
- Ott, Frederick W. The Films of Fritz Lang. Citadel Press, 1979.
