= Not for Sale (film) =

1924 film

- Mary Brough, George Bellamy and Maud Gill as three of the boarding house residents
- Directed by: W. P. Kellino
- Written by: Monica Ewer (novel); Lydia Hayward
- Starring: Mary Odette; Ian Hunter; Gladys Hamer; Mary Brough
- Cinematography: Percy Strong
- Edited by: Challis Sanderson
- Production company: Stoll Pictures
- Distributed by: Stoll Pictures
- Release date: November 1924
- Running time: 6,460 feet
- Country: United Kingdom
- Languages: Silent; English intertitles

Not for Sale is a 1924 British silent comedy film directed by W. P. Kellino and starring Mary Odette, Ian Hunter and Gladys Hamer. It was made at Cricklewood Studios by Stoll Pictures, and based on a novel by Monica Ewer. The film's sets were designed by the art director Walter Murton. It is still extant, unlike many silent films of the era which are now considered lost.

== Plot ==
After being disinherited by his father due to his extravagant lifestyle, Lord Bering's acquisitive society fiancée breaks off the engagement. He goes to live in a boarding house in Bloomsbury under an assumed name and gets a job as a chauffeur.

His experiences open his eyes to how the other half live, and he befriends Annie Armstrong the owner of the boarding house and her younger brother. When he is wrongly accused of stealing by his employer, he decides to leave London. While hop-picking in Kent he discovers that he has come into a large sum of money. When he proposes to Annie however she misunderstands and tells him that she is "not for sale". However, when Bering falls ill, Annie changes her mind and arranges a reconciliation with his father.

== Cast ==
- Mary Odette as Annie Armstrong
- Ian Hunter as Martin Bering
- Gladys Hamer as Florrie
- Mary Brough as Mrs. Keane
- Lionelle Howard as Bertie Strangeways
- Phyllis Lytton as Virginia Strangeway
- Edward O'Neill as Earl of Rathbury
- Mickey Brantford as John Armstrong
- Julie Kean as Tibbles Armstrong
- W.G. Saunders as Sunny Jim
- Jack Trevor as Desmond North
- Maud Gill as Miss Carter
- Minna Leslie as Mrs. Lovell
- Robert Vallis as Roberts
- Moore Marriott as Solicitor
- George Bellamy as Boarder

== Bibliography ==
- Low, Rachael. History of the British Film, 1918-1929. George Allen & Unwin, 1971.
