= Joan Wyndham (actress) =

British actress (1911–2000)

- Born: 2 September 1911; Westminster, London, United Kingdom
- Died: 4 May 2000 (aged 88); Hitchin, Hertfordshire, United Kingdom
- Occupation: Actress
- Years active: 1930–1949 (film & TV)

Joan Wyndham (1911–2000) was a British actress. She appeared in leading roles in several films of the 1930s such as The Fortunate Fool.

== Filmography ==
- Call of the Circus (1930)
- Leave It to Me (1930)
- Up for the Cup (1931)
- High Society (1932)
- Josser on the River (1932)
- The Lucky Number (1932)
- The Fortunate Fool (1933)
- Loyalties (1933)
- Love's Old Sweet Song (1933)
- Gay Old Dog (1935)
- Juggernaut (1936)
- Smith (1949, TV film)

== Bibliography ==
- Goble, Alan. The Complete Index to Literary Sources in Film. Walter de Gruyter, 1999.
