= Muriel Aked =

English film actress (1883–1955)

- Aked in 1938
- Born: 9 November 1883; Bingley, West Riding of Yorkshire, England
- Died: 21 March 1955 (aged 71); Settle, West Riding of Yorkshire, England
- Years active: 1922–1953

Muriel Aked (9 November 1883 – 21 March 1955) was an English film actress.

== Early life, family and education ==
Aked was born in Bingley, West Riding of Yorkshire, England to George Henry Aked and his wife Emma (née Bairstow). Her sister was the great-great grandmother of George Blagden, her cousin Edward Bairstow.

She was a student at Liverpool Repertory Theatre for six months but due to World War I left to perform war work.

== Career ==
Aked made her screen debut in 1920 in A Sister to Assist 'Er. She also appeared in Can You Hear Me, Mother?, Public Nuisance No.1, Autumn Crocus (1934), Royal Eagle, Fame and Don't Rush Me.

== Filmography ==
=== Film ===
Year	Title	Role	Notes
1922	A Sister to Assist 'Er	Mrs. Crawley	
1926	Bindle's Cocktail	Lady Knobb-Kerrick	Short
1930	A Sister to Assist 'Er	Mrs. Crawley	
1930	The Middle Watch	Charlotte Hopkinson	
1930	Bed and Breakfast	Mrs. Boase	
1931	Bindle		
1932	Goodnight, Vienna	Marya	
1932	The Indiscretions of Eve	Mother	
1932	The Mayor's Nest	Mrs. Ashcroft	
1932	Rome Express	Spinster	
1932	Her First Affaire	Agatha Brent	
1933	Yes, Madam	Mrs. Peabody	
1933	The Good Companions	Vicar's Wife	
1933	No Funny Business	Mrs. Fothergill	
1933	Trouble	Miss May	
1933	Friday the Thirteenth	Miss Twigg	
1934	Autumn Crocus	Miss Mayne	
1934	Runaway Queen	Marie Soubrekoff	
1934	Mr Stringfellow Says No	Mrs. Piper	
1934	Evensong	Tremlowe	
1934	Josser on the Farm	Mrs. Savage	
1935	The Night of the Party	Princess Maria Amelia	
1935	Can You Hear Me, Mother?	Mother	
1936	Mother, Don't Rush Me	Amy Andrews	
1936	Public Nuisance No. 1	Miss Trumps	
1936	Fame	Mrs. Bertwhistle	
1936	Royal Eagle	Miss Mimm	
1939	Continental Express	Mme. Duvivier	
1939	A Girl Must Live	Mme. Dupont	
1940	The Girl Who Forgot	Mrs. Badger	
1941	Kipps		Uncredited
1941	Cottage to Let	Miss Fernery	U.S. title, 'Bombsight Stolen'.
1943	The Life and Death of Colonel Blimp	Aunt Margaret	
1943	The Demi-Paradise	Mrs. Tisdall-Stanton	
1944	Two Thousand Women	Claire Meredith	
1944	Men of Rochdale	Annie	Short
1945	The Wicked Lady	Mrs. Munce	
1946	They Knew Mr. Knight	Lady Gilling	
1946	The Years Between	Mrs. May	Uncredited
1948	So Evil My Love	Miss Shoebridge	
1948	Just William's Luck	Emily	
1948	A Sister to Assist 'Er	Daisy Crawley	
1948	It's Hard to Be Good	Ellen Beckett	
1948	Another Shore	Little Old Lady	
1948	William Comes to Town	Emily	
1950	The Blue Lamp	Beryl Waterboume	Uncredited
1950	The Happiest Days of Your Life	Miss Jezzard	
1951	The Wonder Kid	Miss Frisbie	
1951	Flesh and Blood	Mrs. Walker	
1953	The Story of Gilbert and Sullivan	Queen Victoria	(final film role)

=== Television ===
Year	Title	Role	Notes
1939	Murder on the Second Floor	Miss Snell	TV movie
1947	The Cradle Song	The Vicaress	TV movie
1947	Goodness, How Sad!	Mrs. Priskin	TV movie
1948	Chain Male	Aunt Louie	TV movie
1952	Sunday Night Theatre		Episode: "The Truth About the Truth"
