= Peggy Simpson =

British actress (1913–1994)

- in The 39 Steps (1935)
- Born: 4 July 1913; Leeds, West Riding of Yorkshire, England, UK
- Died: 1 January 1994 (aged 80); Camden, London, England, UK
- Occupation: Actress
- Years active: 1933-1960

Peggy Simpson (4 July 1913 – 1 January 1994) was a British actress. She appeared twice for director Alfred Hitchcock in The 39 Steps (1935) and Young and Innocent (1937).

== Partial filmography ==
- Sleeping Car (1933) - (uncredited)
- My Old Dutch (1934) - (uncredited)
- The Camels Are Coming (1934) - Tourist
- Temptation (1934) - Piri
- Fighting Stock (1935) - Maid
- The 39 Steps (1935) - Maid
- Everything Is Thunder (1936) - Mizi
- Where There's a Will (1936) - Barbara Stubbins
- Jack of All Trades (1936) - Typist
- Darby and Joan (1937) - Joan Templeton
- Young and Innocent (1937) - Alice - Bathing Girl (uncredited)
- Dentist in the Chair (1960) - Miss Brent
- No Kidding (1960) - Mother of Angus (final film role)
