= Second to None (film) =

1927 film

- Directed by: Jack Raymond
- Written by: Lydia Hayward
- Produced by: Dinah Shurey
- Starring: Moore Marriott; Ian Fleming; Benita Hume
- Production company: Britannia Films
- Distributed by: Gaumont British Distributors
- Release date: 22 August 1927
- Country: United Kingdom
- Languages: Silent; English intertitles

Second to None is a 1927 British silent war film directed by Jack Raymond and starring Moore Marriott, Ian Fleming and Benita Hume. The screenplay concerns a naval family who come under strain when their son goes absent without leave to settle a domestic problem with his wife.

== Cast ==
- Moore Marriott as Bill Hyde
- Ian Fleming as Brian Douglas
- Benita Hume as Ina
- Mickey Brantford as Bill, as child
- Aggie Brantford as Ina, as child
- Alf Goddard as Curley
- Johnny Butt as Tubby
- A.B. Imeson as Levine
- Daisy Campbell as Mrs Hyde
- Tom Coventry as Old Lemon

== Bibliography ==
- Low, Rachael. The History of the British Film 1918-1929. George Allen & Unwin, 1971.
