= Gladys Hamer =

British actress (1884–1967)

- Born: 27 May 1884; United Kingdom
- Died: 13 March 1967 (aged 82); Los Angeles, California; United States
- Occupations: Film actress Stage actress
- Years active: 1921–1935 (film)

Gladys Hamer (27 May 1884 – 13 March 1967) was a British stage and film actress. She appeared in a number of silent and early sound films.

== Selected filmography ==
- Mary-Find-the-Gold (1921)
- Monty Works the Wires (1921)
- The Rest Cure (1923)
- This Freedom (1923)
- Not for Sale (1924)
- His Grace Gives Notice (1924)
- Money Isn't Everything (1925)
- The Gold Cure (1925)
- Confessions (1925)
- Every Mother's Son (1926)
- The Magician (1926)
- Passion Island (1927)
- Sailors Don't Care (1928)
- Smashing Through (1929)
- Alf's Carpet (1929)
- Kissing Cup's Race (1930)
- Lord Richard in the Pantry (1930)
- Number, Please (1931)
- Sunshine Susie (1931)
- Double Dealing (1932)
- Great Stuff (1933)
- Easy Money (1934)
- Three Witnesses (1935)
- That's My Uncle (1935)

== Bibliography ==
- Low, Rachael. History of the British Film, 1918–1929. George Allen & Unwin, 1971.
