= The Rose of Surrey =

1913 film

- Directed by: Larry Trimble
- Starring: Florence Turner; Frank Powell; Millicent Vernon; Leal Douglas
- Production company: Turner Films
- Release date: 23 March 1914
- Country: United Kingdom
- Languages: Silent; English intertitles

The Rose of Surrey is a British silent drama film of 1913 directed by Larry Trimble and starring Florence Turner, Frank Powell, Millicent Vernon, and Leal Douglas.

== Outline ==
An attractive widow tries to lure the son of a rich man away from his girlfriend.

== Cast ==
- Florence Turner as Rose Moore
- Frank Powell as Edmund Grey
- Shirley Lea as John Grey
- Millicent Vernon as Vivienne Hunter
- Leal Douglas as Mrs Moore
- Arthur Rodney as Solicitor
