= Carry On (film) =

1927 British film by Dinah Shurey

- Directed by: Dinah Shurey
- Written by: Lydia Hayward; Dinah Shurey
- Produced by: Dinah Shurey; Victor Peers
- Starring: Moore Marriott; Trilby Clark; Alf Goddard; Johnny Butt
- Cinematography: Desmond Dickinson; Randal Terraneau
- Production company: Britannia Films
- Distributed by: Gaumont British Distributors
- Release date: December 1927
- Running time: 7,050 feet
- Country: United Kingdom
- Language: English

Carry On is a 1927 British silent drama film directed by Dinah Shurey and starring Moore Marriott, Trilby Clark and Alf Goddard.

== Production ==
Carry On! deals with British military experiences in the First World War. For the production, Shurey borrowed warships from the Royal Navy.

In November 1927, The Brisbane Courier described the picture as “a British propaganda film”.

== Cast ==
- Moore Marriott as Mick Trevorn
- Trilby Clark as Sylvia
- Alf Goddard as Lumley
- Johnny Butt as Barker
- Mickey Brantford as Mick – as a Child
- Aggie Brantford as Molly – as a Child
- Cynthia Murtagh as Molly
- C. M. Hallard as John Peters
- Patrick Aherne as Bob Halliday
- Lewis Shaw as Bob – as a Child
- Frank Atherley as Admiral Halliday
- Griffith Humphreys as Mr. Freeman
- Wyndham Guise as Oliver Trevorn
- Leal Douglas as Mrs. Trevorn
- Wally Patch as Andrews

== Bibliography ==
- Low, Rachael. History of the British Film, 1918–1929. George Allen & Unwin, 1971.
- Wood, Linda. British Films 1927–1939. British Film Institute, 1986.
