= The Right Element =

1919 British silent film

The Right Element is a 1919 British silent drama film directed by Rex Wilson and starring Campbell Gullan, Miriam Ferris and Tom Reynolds. It was based on a story by Roland Pertwee.

== Cast ==
- Campbell Gullan - Frank Kemble
- Miriam Ferris - Madeleine Wade
- Tom Reynolds - Mr. Wade
- Mary Rorke - Aunt Harriet
- Annie Esmond - Mrs. Wade
- John Kelt - Pender
- George K. Gee - Pender Jr.
