= A Will and a Way =

1922 film

- Directed by: Manning Haynes
- Produced by: George Redman
- Starring: Ernest Hendrie; Polly Emery; Johnny Butt
- Production company: Artistic Pictures
- Distributed by: Artistic Pictures
- Release date: February 1922
- Country: United Kingdom
- Languages: Silent; English intertitles

A Will and a Way is a 1922 British silent comedy film directed by Manning Haynes and starring Ernest Hendrie, Polly Emery and Johnny Butt.

== Cast ==
- Ernest Hendrie as Foxey Green
- Polly Emery as Mrs. Pottle
- Johnny Butt as Joe Chambers
- Cynthia Murtagh as Fora Pottle
- Charles Ashton as George Smith
- Ada Palmer as Eliza Collins
- Agnes Brantford as Mrs. Waker
- Peggie Beans as Jenny Pottle
- Maisie Beans as Lertie Pottle

== Bibliography ==
- Goble, Alan. The Complete Index to Literary Sources in Film. Walter de Gruyter, 1999.
