= Darby and Joan (1937 film) =

British drama by Syd Courtenay

- Directed by: Syd Courtenay
- Written by: Syd Courtenay
- Produced by: Nat Ross
- Starring: Peggy Simpson; Ian Fleming; Mickey Brantford; Tod Slaughter
- Cinematography: John Silver
- Production company: Rock Studios
- Distributed by: MGM
- Release date: February 1937
- Running time: 76 minutes
- Country: United Kingdom
- Language: English

Darby and Joan (also known as She's My Darling) is a 1937 British drama film directed by Syd Courtenay and starring Peggy Simpson, Ian Fleming, Tod Slaughter and Mickey Brantford. It was written by Courtenay based on the 1888 novel Darby and Joan by Rita (pen-name of Eliza Humphreys). The film was a quota quickie, made at Rock Studios, Elstree, for release by MGM.

== Plot ==
Darby Templeton is a young blind girl. Her elder sister Joan falls in love with Yorke Ferris, a work-shy rogue, but instead she marries his uncle, Sir Ralph. Yorke is found shot and Sir Ralph is suspected, but Darby, with her acute sense of hearing, finds clues which exonerate him.

== Cast ==
- Peggy Simpson as Joan Templeton
- Ian Fleming as Sir Ralph Ferris
- Mickey Brantford as Yorke Ferris
- Tod Slaughter as Mr Templeton
- Audrene Brier as Connie
- Pamela Bevan as Darby Templeton
- Ella Retford as nurse
- Harvey Braban as coroner

== Alternate version ==
As of 2018, a cropped and shortened down to 45 minutes 16 mm version entitled She's My Darling released in 1949 was known to still exist.

She's My Darling was broadcast on the UK channel Talking Pictures TV on 1 November 2024. This version, without commercials, ran 66 minutes.

== Reception ==
The Monthly Film Bulletin wrote: "Dialogue and outlook are those of the sentimental Victorian novel; action is slow and angles repetitive, though some of the photography is of nice quality. The little girl, Pamela Bevan, shows real talent in portraying blindness but the acting is weak and the direction is amateurish."

Kine Weekly wrote: "Old-time melodrama in ill-fitting modern guise, clumsily adapted from Rita's Victorian best-seller. The senility of the story is a joke, and there is not one member of the cast capable of letting it down lightly. No attempt has been made to honour the dead. Not recommended, except as a possible quota offering. ... Peggy Simpson, lan Fleming, Mickey Brantford, and Pamela Bevan are the principal players, but their acting is as dated as the plot. The novel by Rita from which this melodrama is adapted was widely read in its day, but the conventions and times have changed considerably since it was first written. The play moves with a heavy tread through exterior and interior settings the like of which have never been seen in real life."

Picturegoer wrote: "Rita's story has been very indilferently brought up-to-date and the entertainment values are negligible. ... The whole thing is hopelessly dated and the acting does nothing to remove its handicaps."

In British Sound Films: The Studio Years 1928–1959 David Quinlan rated the film as "poor", writing: "Dated weepie."

To a modern audience, it’s notable for containing one of Tod Slaughter’s few non-villainous roles, as a recently widowed father. The worst his character does is withhold the truth about his finances from his (already very well-off) family.
