= Lydia Hayward =

British screenwriter and actress (1879–1945)

- Born: 12 October 1879; Sheffield, England
- Died: 3 June 1945 (aged 65)
- Occupation: Screenwriter
- Years active: 1920–1942

Lydia Hayward (1879–1945) was a British screenwriter and actress who worked on over 30 screenplays between 1920 and 1942. She was particularly active during the 1920s. Hayward has been noted for several of the sophisticated comedy films she wrote for during the decade. She was married to the director Manning Haynes with whom she frequently collaborated, as well as Australian actor William Freshman.

== Selected filmography ==
- Pillars of Society (1920)
- Three Men in a Boat (1920)
- Monty Works the Wires (1921)
- The Skipper's Wooing (1922)
- A Bachelor's Baby (1922)
- The Head of the Family (1922)
- The Monkey's Paw (1923)
- Not for Sale (1924)
- Dixon's Return (1924)
- We Women (1925)
- Confessions (1925)
- The Gold Cure (1925)
- Carry On (1927)
- Passion Island (1927)
- Somehow Good (1927)
- Second to None (1927)
- The Ware Case (1928)
- A Peep Behind the Scenes (1929)
- Bitter Sweet (1933)
- Mrs. Dane's Defence (1933)
- Love's Old Sweet Song (1933)
- The Missing People (1940)
- The Man at the Gate (1941)
- You Will Remember (1941)
- Hard Steel (1942)

== Bibliography ==
- Low, Rachel. The History of British Film: Volume IV, 1918–1929. Routledge, 1997.
- Nelmes, Jill. Analysing the Screenplay. Taylor & Francis, 2011.
- Hunter, I.Q. & Porter, Laraine. British Comedy Cinema. Routledge, 2012.
