= This Freedom =

1923 British silent drama film

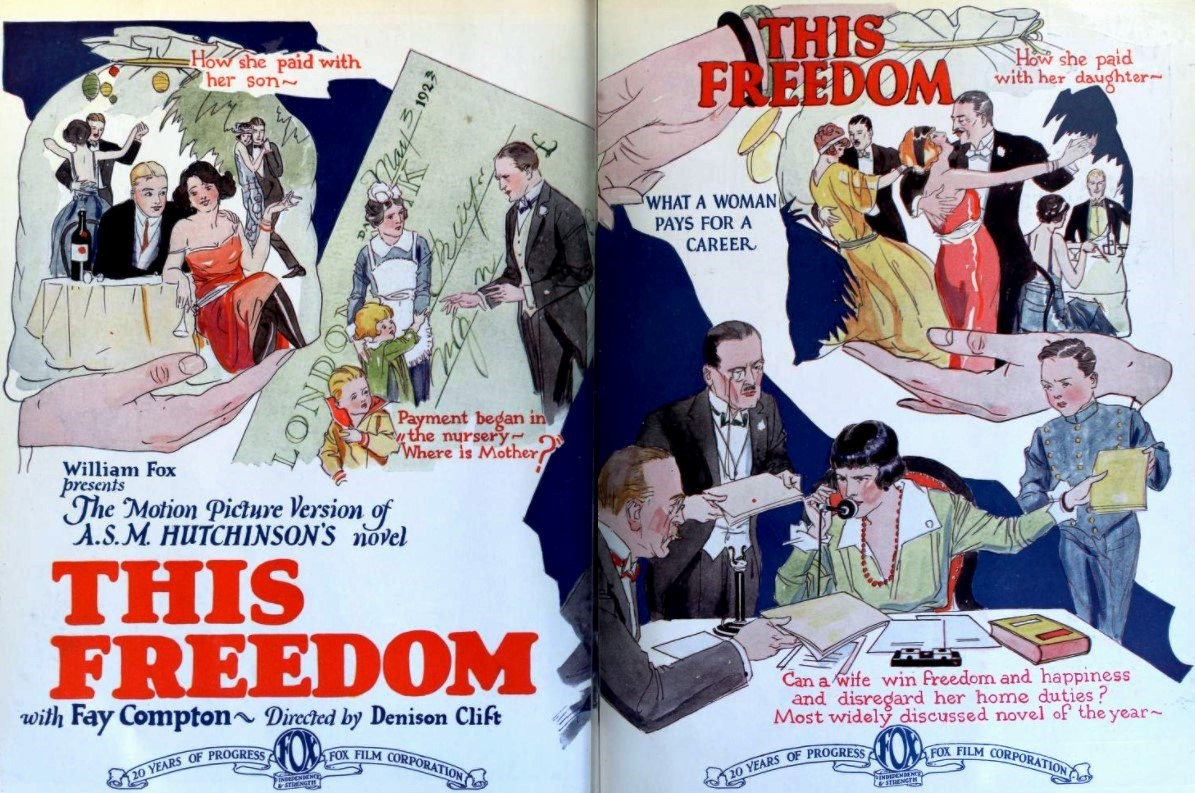
- American advertisement
- Directed by: Denison Clift
- Written by: Denison Clift
- Based on: This Freedom by A. S. M. Hutchinson
- Starring: Fay Compton; Clive Brook; John Stuart; Athene Seyler
- Production company: Ideal Film Company
- Distributed by: Ideal Film Company; Fox Film (US)
- Release date: 21 March 1923
- Running time: 7 reels
- Country: United Kingdom
- Language: Silent (English intertitles)

This Freedom is a 1923 British silent drama film directed and wrtitten by Denison Clift and starring Fay Compton, Clive Brook and John Stuart. It was based on the novel This Freedom by A. S. M. Hutchinson.

== Plot ==
Exhibitor's Trade Review summarised the plot as: "a woman, who learned as a child that man's power was too dominating, strikes out in search of independence. She rears a family as a businesswoman, leaving the children to a governess. Her formula backfires and the fallacy of her ideas is the climax."

== Cast ==
- Fay Compton as Rosalie Aubyn
- Clive Brook as Harry Occleve
- John Stuart as Huggo Occleve
- Athene Seyler as Miss Keggs
- Nancy Kenyon as Doda Occleve
- Gladys Hamer as Gertrude
- Fewlass Llewellyn as Reverend Aubyn
- Adeline Hayden Coffin as Mrs. Aubyn
- Mickey Brantford as Robert
- Bunty Fosse as Rosalie, as a child
- Joan Maude as Hilda
- Charles Vane as Uncle Pyke
- Gladys Hamilton as Aunt Belle
- Robert English as Mr. Field
- Charles Hawtrey (uncredited)
