= Love's Old Sweet Song (1933 film) =

- Theatrical release poster
- Directed by: Manning Haynes
- Written by: Lydia Hayward
- Produced by: John Argyle
- Starring: John Stuart; Joan Wyndham; William Freshman
- Cinematography: Desmond Dickinson
- Music by: Guy Jones
- Production company: Argyle Talking Pictures
- Distributed by: Butcher's Film Service
- Release date: 1933
- Running time: 79 minutes
- Country: United Kingdom
- Language: English

Love's Old Sweet Song (re-released in 1940 as The Missing Witness) is a 1933 British romance film directed by Manning Haynes and starring John Stuart, Joan Wyndham and William Freshman. It was written by Lydia Hayward and made at Cricklewood Studios.

== Cast ==
- John Stuart as Paul Kingslake
- Joan Wyndham as Mary Dean
- William Freshman as Jimmy Croft
- Julie Suedo as Iris Sinclair
- Ronald Ward as Eric Kingslake
- Charles Courtney
- Barbara Everest as nurse
- Dora Levis
- Moore Marriott as Old Tom
- Ivor Maxwell as Rodger Kingslake
- Picot Schooling
- Malcolm Tod as announcer
- Marie Wright as Sarah

== Reception ==
The Daily Film Renter wrote: "Picture of the Monastery Garden type, with a ready-made audience in the provinces, where it will probably gross plenty of money. Story is naive, and direction old-fashioned, but title ballad, pleasantly rendered by Joan Wyndham, and smooth performance by John Stuart, plus the sentimental nature of the theme, stamp it as a good proposition for popular halls. ... The direction is definitely old-fashioned, and the narrative not beyond reproof, but the general effect of the picture is one of sentimental drama that seldom fails to win provincial approval."

Kine Weekly wrote: "Sentimental melodrama, a naive, popular mixture of the simple and sophisticated, suggested by the famous old ballad. Although the story is conventional in substance, the plot nevertheless clearly leads to comprehensive entertainment, the appeal of which is directed with unfailing skill to the masses. A sound cast enters into the spirit of the play, and the earnestness of the artists, coupled with straightforward direction, in which good pictorial work plays a pleasing part, put the seal of satisfaction on the picture, and enables it to carry modest emotional appeal. Sound programme proposition, with excellent title, one fraught with possibilities, for popular and industrial halls."

Picturegoer wrote: "A mixture of robust melodrama, naive sentiment, and artless emotionalism, which will please those whose predelictions tend to the sentimental. ... Joan Wyndham is fair as the heroine; her voice is doubled in the vocal sequence which introduces the title of the film. John Stuart is adequate as the hero, as is William Freshman as a young farmer, who also loves the unfortunate heroine. The best acting, however, comes from Ronald Ward as the husband."
