= Mary Rorke =

British actress (1858–1938)

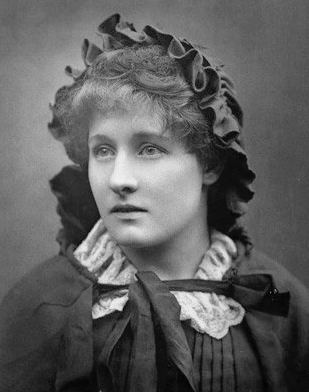
Mary Rorke c. 1886

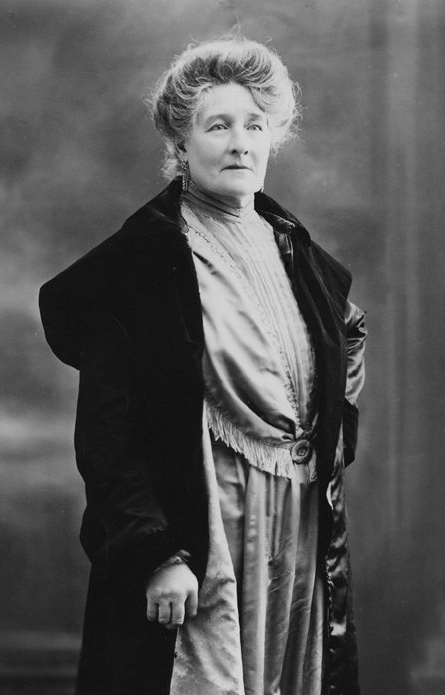
Mary Rorke in 1919

Mary Ellen St Aubyn (née Rorke; 14 February 1858, in London – 12 October 1938 in London) was an English stage and film actress. She began her career at age 15 and was active for over 60 years.

== Early life ==
Rorke was the daughter of John Rorke and Lucy Whithall, and the older sister of fellow actress Kate Rorke.

== Career ==
At age 15, Rorke made her stage debut in the Christmas 1873 pantomime production of Little Puss in Boots at the Princess's Theatre, London. The following year, she played Phoebe in As You Like It. Rorke portrayed Elizabeth of York alongside Richard Mansfield in Richard III at the Globe Theatre in 1889.

In 1894, Rorke and her sister went on the Dr and Mrs Neill tour.

Rorke made her screen debut in 1913. She retired from acting after making her final appearance in the 1933 film Reckless Decision.

== Personal life ==
Rorke married architect Frank William St Aubyn. She died on 12 October 1938 at age 80.

== Select filmography ==
- Caste (1915)
- The Marriage of William Ashe (1916)
- Dr. Wake's Patient (1916)
- The Second Mrs Tanqueray (1916)
- Tinker, Tailor, Soldier, Sailor (1918)
- The Right Element (1919)
- The Bridal Chair (1919)
- Testimony (1920)
- Unmarried (1920)
- Pillars of Society (1920)
- Boy Woodburn (1922)
- The Starlit Garden (1923)
- M'Lord of the White Road (1923)
- The Harbour Lights (1923)
- Thou Fool (1926)
- For Valour (1928)
- Reckless Decision (1933)
