= Monty Works the Wires =

1921 film

- Directed by: Manning Haynes
- Written by: Manning Haynes; Lydia Hayward
- Produced by: George Redman
- Starring: Manning Haynes; Mildred Evelyn; Eva Westlake
- Production company: Artistic Pictures
- Distributed by: Artistic Pictures
- Release date: June 1921
- Country: United Kingdom
- Languages: Silent; English intertitles

Monty Works the Wires is a 1921 British silent comedy film directed by Manning Haynes and Challis Sanderson and starring Haynes, Mildred Evelyn and Eva Westlake.

== Cast ==
- H. Manning Haynes as The Man
- Mildred Evelyn as The Girl
- Eva Westlake as The Auntie
- Charles Ashton as The Brother-in-Law
- Gladys Hamer as The Maid
- Thomas Canning as The Doctor

== Bibliography ==
- Murphy, Robert. Directors in British and Irish Cinema: A Reference Companion. British Film Institute, 2006.
