= Dorothy Seacombe =

British actress (1906–1994)

- Detail of still 1930 by Dudley Glanfield © National Portrait Gallery
- Born: 22 March 1906; Bolton, Lancashire, England
- Died: December 1994; London, England
- Occupation: Actress

Dorothy Seacombe (22 March 1906 – December 1994) was a British film actress.

== Filmography ==
- Blinkeyes (1926)
- The Flag Lieutenant (1926)
- The Third Eye (1929)
- The Loves of Robert Burns (1930)
- Lord Richard in the Pantry (1930)
- Leave It to Me (1930)
- The Yellow Mask (1930)
- The Ware Case (1938)
- Many Tanks Mr. Atkins (1938)
