= Juggernaut (1936 film) =

1936 film starring Boris Karloff

- Directed by: Henry Edwards
- Written by: Alice Campbell; Cyril Campion; Heinrich Fraenkel; H. Fowler Mear
- Produced by: Edward L. Alperson; Julius Hagen
- Starring: Boris Karloff; Joan Wyndham
- Cinematography: Sydney Blythe; William Luff
- Edited by: Michael C. Chorlton
- Music by: W.L. Trytel
- Production company: Twickenham Studios
- Distributed by: Wardour Films (UK); Grand National Pictures (US); Superior Pictures (Can)
- Release dates: 8 September 1936 (UK); 30 April 1937 (US)
- Running time: 64 minutes
- Country: United Kingdom
- Language: English

Juggernaut (also known as The Demon Doctor) is a 1936 British mystery film directed by Henry Edwards and starring Boris Karloff and Joan Wyndham. It was written by Cyril Campion, Heinrich Fraenkel and.H. Fowler Mear based on the novel of the same name by Alice Campbell and was distributed by Julius Hagen Productions.

== Plot ==
Victor Sartorius is an ailing doctor working in Morocco. He teams up with Lady Yvonne Clifford in a plot to poison her husband, Sir Charles Clifford, so he can collect the £20,000 necessary to save his experiments and his funding. Roger Clifford, the son of Sir Charles, has also been marked for death. The only one who can stop the murder plot is Nurse Eve Row.

== Cast ==
- Boris Karloff as Dr. Victor Sartorius
- Joan Wyndham as Nurse Eve Rowe
- Arthur Margetson as Roger Clifford
- Mona Goya as Lady Yvonne Clifford
- Anthony Ireland as Capt. Arthur Halliday (as Antony Ireland)
- Morton Selten as Sir Charles Clifford
- Nina Boucicault as Miss Mary Clifford (as Mina Boucicault)
- Gibb McLaughlin as Jacques (servant)
- J. H. Roberts as Chalmers (butler) (as H.H. Roberts)
- Victor Rietti as Dr. Bousquet

== Reception ==
The Monthly Film Bulletin wrote: "The story is improbable and the thrills sometimes touch absurdity, but there is plenty of action and the acting is well suited to the story. The film is set in the Riviera, but the chief stress is laid upon lavish interiors which might be anywhere. The direction is competent, the photography uneven, the sound good."

Kine Weekly wrote: "The wholly incredible plot gets very little help from the director."

Variety wrote: "An uninspired meller, this one stands or falls on Karloff's name, for there is little else about it to help sell it. ... Karloff's portrayal in the main role is commendably real, except in the final scenes, but his make-up will disappoint, as all he wears is a scrubby mustache, Mona Goya plays the wife in vampish siyle, and though there are indications of talent, the picture doesn't help much in testing how far it goes. ... Main part of the footage is dull but the final reel tries to make up the speed with disastrous results. Intended to bring the tale to a suspenseful climax, it will instead probably bring titters. By re-shooting these sequences in a less frenzied manner, film might be saved, although doubtful whether it's worth the trouble.

In British Sound Films: The Studio Years 1928–1959 David Quinlan rated the film as "mediocre", writing: "Lurid thriller, feeble by Karloff standards."

== See also ==
- Boris Karloff filmography
