= Tony Inglis =

Art director

- Born: Anthony Vivian Inglis; 14 April 1911; Dublin, Ireland
- Died: 25 September 1997 (aged 86); Camden, London, England
- Occupation: Art director
- Years active: 1949-1980

Anthony Vivian Inglis (14 April 1911 – 25 September 1997) was an Irish-British art director for films. He was nominated for an Academy Award in the category Best Art Direction for the film The Man Who Would Be King. Born in Dublin, Ireland, he died in Camden, London, England.

== Selected filmography ==
- 1951: No Resting Place
- 1951: Return to Glennascaul (short)
- 1956: Pacific Destiny (as Anthony Inglis)
- 1958: Cat & Mouse
- 1959: Witness in the Dark (as Anthony Inglis)
- 1959: This Other Eden
- 1960: The Shakedown (as Anthony Inglis)
- 1960: Your Money or Your Wife
- 1961: Johnny Nobody
- 1961: Enter Inspector Duval
- 1961: Murder in Eden
- 1961: A Question of Suspense
- 1962: The Devil's Agent
- 1963: The Girl Hunters
- 1963: Breath of Life
- 1964: Das Verrätertor
- 1965: Voodoo Blood Death
- 1970: The Private Life of Sherlock Holmes
- 1975: The Man Who Would Be King
