= A Sister to Assist 'Er (1922 film) =

1922 film

- Directed by: George Dewhurst
- Written by: George Dewhurst; John le Breton
- Produced by: John L. Baron
- Starring: Mary Brough; Polly Emery; Muriel Aked; Billy Baron
- Release date: 1922
- Country: United Kingdom

A Sister to Assist 'Er is a 1922 British silent comedy film directed by George Dewhurst and starring Mary Brough, Polly Emery and Muriel Aked. It was based on the play A Sister to Assist 'Er by John le Breton.

== Cast ==
- Mary Brough ... Mrs. Millie May
- Polly Emery ... Mrs. Mull
- Muriel Aked ... Mrs. Crawley
- John MacAndrews ... Fishmonger
