= The Head of the Family (1922 film) =

1922 film

- Directed by: Manning Haynes
- Written by: W.W. Jacobs (story); Lydia Hayward
- Produced by: George Redman
- Starring: Johnny Butt; Cynthia Murtagh; John Ashton
- Production company: Artistic Pictures
- Distributed by: Artistic Pictures
- Release date: June 1922
- Country: United Kingdom
- Languages: Silent; English intertitles

The Head of the Family is a 1922 British silent comedy film directed by Manning Haynes and starring Johnny Butt, Cynthia Murtagh and John Ashton.

== Cast ==
- Johnny Butt as Green
- Cynthia Murtagh as Betty Foster
- John Ashton as Robert Letts
- Daisy England as Mrs. Green
- Bertie White as Henry Whidden
- Moore Marriott as Mate

== Bibliography ==
- Murphy, Robert. Directors in British and Irish Cinema: A Reference Companion. British Film Institute, 2006.
