= A Peep Behind the Scenes (novel) =

Novel

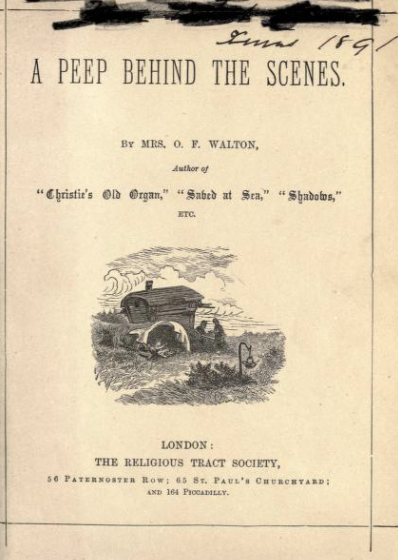
- Title page for A Peep Behind the Scenes (1891)
- Author: Mrs. O. F. Walton
- Language: English
- Genre: Drama
- Publication date: 1877
- Publication place: United Kingdom
- Media type: Print

A Peep Behind the Scenes is a British novel first published in 1877 by Mrs. O. F. Walton, the pen name of Amy Catherine Walton. It portrays the life of a travelling fair and in particular Rosalie, a girl who works, as part of a theatre troupe under her domineering father. It was Walton's best-known work.

== Film adaptations ==
The novel was twice turned into silent films. In 1918 Kenelm Foss directed A Peep Behind the Scenes starring Ivy Close and Gerald Ames. In 1929 Jack Raymond made a further version.

== Bibliography ==
- Low, Rachael. History of the British Film, 1918-1929. George Allen & Unwin, 1971.
