= Children of Chance (1930 film) =

1930 British film by Alexander Esway

- Directed by: Alexander Esway
- Written by: Frank Launder; Miles Malleson
- Starring: Elissa Landi; Mabel Poulton; John Stuart
- Cinematography: Ernest Palmer; Leo Rogers
- Edited by: Edward B. Jarvis
- Production company: British International Pictures
- Distributed by: First National-Pathé Pictures
- Release date: 20 November 1930
- Running time: 75 minutes
- Country: United Kingdom
- Language: English

Children of Chance is a 1930 British comedy crime film directed by Alexander Esway and starring Elissa Landi, Mabel Poulton, John Stuart and John Longden.

== Plot ==
Binnie, a struggling young actress, is mistaken for her doppelganger the model Lia Monta. Unfortunately Monta, a woman with a shady past has that very same day stolen some precious pearls and fled to the Continent. Binnie, delighted to have won a film contract with a leading producer who be believes her to be Monta, is forced to face the consequences of the other woman's theft.

== Cast ==
- Elissa Landi as Binnie/Lia Monta
- Mabel Poulton as Molly
- John Stuart as Gordon
- John Longden as Jeffrey
- Gus McNaughton as H.K. Zinkuyell
- Wallace Lupino as O.K. Johnson
- Gus Sharland as Hugo
- John Deverell as Harold
- Charles Dormer as Dude
- Dorothy Minto as Sally
- Kay Hammond as Joyce
- Aileen Despard (credited as Eileen Despard) as Beryl

== Production ==
It was made at Elstree Studios by British International Pictures, the country's biggest production company of the era. A separate German version Children of Fortune was also made. Such multiple-language versions were common during the early years of sound before dubbing became more established.

== Bibliography ==
- Low, Rachael. Filmmaking in 1930s Britain. George Allen & Unwin, 1985. ISBN 9780047910425
- Wood, Linda. British Films, 1927-1939. British Film Institute, 1986.
