= Johnny Butt =

English actor (1870–1931)

- Born: John William H. Butt; 3 April 1878; Bradford, Yorkshire, England
- Died: June 1931; North Bierley, Yorkshire, England
- Occupation: Actor
- Years active: 1906–1930

John William H. Butt (3 April 1878 – June 1931) was an English film actor of the silent era.

He was born in Bradford and died in North Bierley, West Yorkshire.

== Selected filmography ==
- The Chimes (1914)
- Far from the Madding Crowd (1915)
- The Grand Babylon Hotel (1916)
- The Man Behind 'The Times' (1917)
- The American Heiress (1917)
- Carrots (1917)
- The Diamond Necklace (1921)
- The Skipper's Wooing (1922)
- Sam's Boy (1922)
- A Will and a Way (1922)
- No. 7 Brick Row (1922)
- The Head of the Family (1922)
- The Monkey's Paw (1923)
- Lawyer Quince (1924)
- The Prehistoric Man (1924)
- Sen Yan's Devotion (1924)
- The Flying Fifty-Five (1924)
- The Gold Cure (1925)
- Nell Gwyn (1926)
- Second to None (1927)
- Passion Island (1927)
- Carry On (1927)
- The Hellcat (1928)
- The Last Post (1929)
- A Peep Behind the Scenes (1929)
- The Clue of the New Pin (1929)
- The Informer (1929)
