= The Traitor's Gate =

1927 novel

- First edition (US)
- Author: Edgar Wallace
- Language: English
- Genre: Crime
- Publisher: Hodder & Stoughton (UK); Doubleday, Page (US)
- Publication date: 1927
- Publication place: United Kingdom
- Media type: Print
- ISBN: 9781846377167
- OCLC: 1039703301

The Traitor's Gate is a 1927 crime novel by the British writer Edgar Wallace. It concerns a plot by a criminal mastermind to steal the Crown Jewels from the Tower of London.

== Adaptations ==
It has been adapted into film twice:

- The Yellow Mask, a 1930 British film directed by Harry Lachman
- Traitor's Gate, a 1964 British-German film directed by Freddie Francis

== Bibliography ==
- Goble, Alan. The Complete Index to Literary Sources in Film. Walter de Gruyter, 1999.
