= A Peep Behind the Scenes (1929 film) =

1929 film

- Directed by: Jack Raymond
- Written by: Amy Catherine Walton (novel); Lydia Hayward
- Produced by: Herbert Wilcox
- Starring: Frances Cuyler; Haddon Mason; Harold Saxon-Snell; Johnny Butt
- Cinematography: Freddie Young
- Production company: British & Dominions Film Corporation
- Distributed by: Woolf & Freedman Film Service
- Release date: January 1929
- Running time: 7,372 feet
- Country: United Kingdom
- Languages: Silent; English intertitles

A Peep Behind the Scenes is a 1929 British silent drama film directed by Jack Raymond and starring Frances Cuyler, Haddon Mason and Harold Saxon-Snell. It was based on the 1877 novel of the same title by Amy Catherine Walton. It was made at Cricklewood Studios.

== Cast ==
- Frances Cuyler as Rosalie Joyce
- Haddon Mason as Toby Charlton
- Harold Saxon-Snell as Augustus Joyce
- Vera Stanton as Gypsy Belle
- Johnny Butt as Jim
- Renée Macready as Norah Joyce
- Ethel Irving as Lucy Leslie
- Clarence Blakiston as Henry Leslie
- Shirley Whyte as Mother Manikin

== Bibliography ==
- Low, Rachel. The History of British Film: Volume IV, 1918–1929. Routledge, 1997.
