= A Sister to Assist 'Er (1938 film) =

- Feature on the film from Kine Weekly (31 March 1938)
- Directed by: George Dewhurst; Widgey R. Newman
- Written by: George Dewhurst; John le Breton
- Based on: A Sister to Assist by John le Breton
- Produced by: Widgey R. Newman
- Starring: Muriel George; Polly Emery; Charles Paton; Billy Percy
- Release date: March 1938
- Running time: 72 minutes
- Country: United Kingdom
- Language: English

A Sister to Assist 'Er is a 1938 British comedy film directed by George Dewhurst and Widgey R. Newman and starring Muriel George, Polly Emery and Charles Paton. It was written by Dewhurst based on the 1912 play A Sister to Assist 'Er by John le Breton.

== Preservation status ==
The British Film Institute National Archive holds a collection of stills but no film or video materials.

== Plot ==
Mrs Getch is the owner of a slum dwelling, and her tenant Mrs May, a widow, manages to scrape by using one trick or another. When Mrs May agrees to marry local fishmonger Joe Harris she impersonates her non-existant wealthy sister, Mrs Le Browning, and cons Mrs Getch into forgiving all her debts.

== Cast ==
- Muriel George as Mrs May / Mrs le Browning
- Polly Emery as Mrs Getch
- Charles Paton as Mr Harris
- Billy Percy as Alf
- Harry Herbert as Mr Getch
- Dorothy Vernon as Mrs Thistlethwaite
- Dora Levis as Mrs Hawkes
- Elsie Shelton as Miss Pilbeam

== Reception ==
The Monthly Film Bulletin wrote: "The popular original, now adapted for the fourth time of asking, has been spun out to undue length. The padding is most apparent in the first half of the picture, which is slowly developed, and only very mildly entertaining. The humour is of the would-be typical Cockney kind, and there is much drinking both before and, of course, during the famous impersonation scene. Muriel George and Polly Emery give effective performances. ... The settings are appropriately dingy, and the whole effect sordid."

Kine Weekly wrote: "Alcohol and the misplaced aspirate figure prominently in the treatment, and these artless forms of humorous expression are turned to good account by the co-stars, Muried George and Polly Emery. A welcome revival, the film should score with the industrial element."
