= A Sister to Assist 'Er (1948 film) =

- Directed by: George Dewhurst
- Written by: George Dewhurst
- Based on: A Sister to Assist 'Er by John le Breton
- Produced by: W.L. Trytel
- Starring: Muriel Aked; Muriel George; Michael Howard
- Cinematography: Ronnie Pilgrim
- Release date: May 1948 (UK)
- Running time: 59 minutes
- Country: United Kingdom
- Language: English

A Sister to Assist 'Er is a 1948 British second feature ('B') comedy film directed by George Dewhurst and starring Muriel Aked, Muriel George and Michael Howard. It was written by Dewhurst based on the play A Sister to Assist 'Er by John le Breton.

== Cast ==
- Muriel Aked as Daisy Crawley
- Muriel George as Gladys May
- Michael Howard as Alf
- Gene Ashley
- Ann Ripley

== Reception ==
The Monthly Film Bulletin wrote: "It is a hackneyed plot which has gained nothing since the days when it was a popular musical-hall sketch. Indeed, the liveliness of its music-hall slapstick is entirely lost on the screen. It is pleasant, however, simply to sit back and let the rest of the film drift on for the pleasure of watching Muriel Aked, who is surely among the finest of British character actresses,"

In British Sound Films: The Studio Years 1928–1959 David Quinlan rated the film as "mediocre", writing: "Yet another Dewhurst-made version of the old stage chestnut, really no better than all the rest."
