= Polly Emery =

English actress (1875–1958)

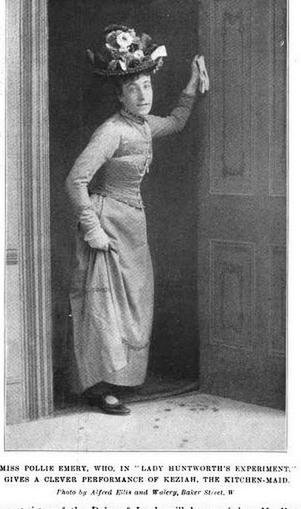
Polly Emery, from a 1900 publication.

Polly Emery (10 May 1875 – 31 October 1958) was an English actress of both silent and talking pictures.

She was born in Bolton, Lancashire, England and died at age 83 at Denville Hall, Northwood, London, England.

== Selected filmography ==
- Watch Your Step (1920)
- The Case of Lady Camber (1920)
- Nothing Else Matters (1920)
- A Sister to Assist 'Er (1922)
- If Four Walls Told (1922)
- A Will and a Way (1922)
- The Pauper Millionaire (1922)
- Beautiful Kitty (1923)
- The Alley of Golden Hearts (1924)
- A Sister to Assist 'Er (1927)
- A Honeymoon Adventure (1931)
- The Third String (1932)
- After Dark (1932)
- The Good Companions (1933)
- Peg of Old Drury (1935)
- Wedding Group (1936)
- A Sister to Assist 'Er (1938)
- Silver Top (1938)
