= Pillars of Society (1920 film) =

1920 film

Pillars of Society is a 1920 British silent drama film directed by Rex Wilson and starring Ellen Terry, Norman McKinnel and Mary Rorke. It was based on the 1877 play The Pillars of Society by Henrik Ibsen. Location shooting was done in Norway, in particular in Grimstad. The adaptation is the first film screenplay written by Lydia Elizabeth Hayward.

== Plot ==
In Norway a shipping magnate frames his absent brother-in-law for theft and betrayal of his mistress.

== Cast ==
- Ellen Terry - Widow Bernick
- Norman McKinnel - John Halligan
- Mary Rorke - Mrs. Halligan
- Joan Lockton - Diana Dorf
- Irene Rooke - Martha Karsten
- Lydia Hayward - Lena Hessel
- Charles Ashton - Dick Alward
- John Kelt - Parson Rogers
- Pamela Neville - Florence
- Lovat Cave-Chinn - Olaf Hessel
