= Manning Haynes =

British film director and actor (1889–1957)

- Born: 1889; Lyminster, Sussex; United Kingdom
- Died: 1957 (aged 67–68); Epsom; United Kingdom
- Other name: H. Manning Haynes
- Occupation: Film director
- Years active: 1917–1938

Horace Manning Haynes (born: Lyminster, Sussex – died 3 March 1957, Epsom, England) (often credited as H. Manning Haynes) was a British-born film director and actor. He was married to the screenwriter Lydia Hayward, with whom he frequently worked.

Manning Haynes' film career as an actor began in 1918's Lead Kindly Light. Haynes switched to directing silent films in the 1920s. He usually billed himself professionally as H. Manning Haynes.

== Selected filmography ==
=== Actor ===
- Home Sweet Home (1917)
- The Lost Chord (1917)
- Ave Maria (1918)
- Linked by Fate (1919)
- Jack, Sam and Pete (1919)
- Monty Works the Wires (1921)
- Stella (1921)

=== Director ===
- Monty Works the Wires (1921)
- The Skipper's Wooing (1922)
- The Head of the Family (1922)
- Sam's Boy (1922)
- A Will and a Way (1922)
- The Monkey's Paw (1923)
- The Constable’s Move (1923)
- Dixon's Return (1924)
- Lawyer Quince (1924)
- London Love (1926)
- The Ware Case (1928)
- Those Who Love (1929)
- Should a Doctor Tell? (1930)
- The Officers' Mess (1931)
- To Oblige a Lady (1931)
- The Old Man (1931)
- Love's Old Sweet Song (1933)
- The Perfect Flaw (1934)
- Tomorrow We Live (1936)
- Pearls Bring Tears (1937)
- East of Ludgate Hill (1937)
