= Lawyer Quince (1924 film) =

1924 film

Lawyer Quince is a 1924 British comedy film directed by Manning Haynes and starring Moore Marriott, Cynthia Murtagh and Charles Ashton. It is based on a short story by W. W. Jacobs and is a remake of a 1914 film version. "A capital two-reel comedy," promised one newspaper listing.

== Cast ==
- Moore Marriott - Quince
- Cynthia Murtagh - Celia Rose
- Charles Ashton - Ned Quince
- George Wynn - His Rival
- Johnny Butt - Farmer Rose
- J. Edwards Barker - Bully
- Ada Palmer - Widow
