= Traitor's Gate (film) =

1964 film by Freddie Francis

- Original British film poster
- Directed by: Freddie Francis
- Written by: Jimmy Sangster; Edgar Wallace (novel)
- Produced by: Ted Lloyd; Horst Wendlandt
- Starring: Albert Lieven; Gary Raymond; Klaus Kinski
- Cinematography: Denys Coop; Ray Hearne
- Edited by: Oswald Hafenrichter
- Music by: Peter Thomas
- Production companies: Rialto Film, Summit Film Productions Ltd.
- Distributed by: Columbia Pictures; Constantin Film
- Release date: 18 December 1964
- Running time: 87 minutes
- Countries: West Germany; United Kingdom
- Languages: English; German

Traitor's Gate (German: Das Verrätertor) is a 1964 West German-British co-production of a black-and-white crime film directed by Freddie Francis and starring Albert Lieven, Gary Raymond, Catherine Schell and Klaus Kinski. It was made by Rialto Film using Hammer Films' Freddie Francis and screenwriter Jimmy Sangster updating the 1927 novel The Traitor's Gate by Edgar Wallace to the mid-1960s. The film features a group of criminals planning to steal the Crown Jewels of the United Kingdom from the Tower of London. It was shot at Twickenham Studios and on location around London. The film's sets were designed by the art director Tony Inglis.

== Cast ==
- Albert Lieven as Trayne
- Gary Raymond as Graham / Dick
- Margot Trooger as Dinah
- Catherine Schell as Hope Joyner
- Eddi Arent as Hector
- Klaus Kinski as Kane
- Anthony James as John
- Tim Barrett as Lloyd
- Heinz Bernard as Martin
- David Birks as Spider
- Edward Underdown as Inspector Adams
- Alec Ross as Sergeant Ross
- Julie Mendez as Stripper
- Peter Porteous as Kelly
- Katy Wild as Mary
- Harry Baird as Mate on Tramp Steamer
- Joe Ritchie as News Vendor
- Frank Sieman as Yeoman Warden Guide
- Frank Forsyth as Chief Yeoman Warden
- Caron Gardner as Blonde
- Maurice Good as King
- Robert Hunter as Captain
- Marianne Stone as Cashier at Dandy Club
- Hedger Wallace as Detective Sergeant Alexander
- Beresford Williams as Warden

== Reception ==
In Germany, the FSK gave the film a rating of "12 and up" and found it not appropriate for screenings on public holidays. It premiered on 18 December 1964.
