= John F. Hamilton =

American actor (1893–1967)

- Born: November 7, 1893; New York City, New York; U.S.
- Died: July 11, 1967 (aged 73); Paramus, New Jersey; U.S.
- Other name: John Frank Hamilton
- Education: Fordham University
- Occupations: Film actor Stage actor
- Years active: 1924 - 1961 (film and television)

John F. Hamilton (November 7, 1893 – July 11, 1967) was an American-born actor who worked for many years in the theater but only occasionally on film. He is probably best-remembered as Pops, father of Eva Marie Saint's character, in Elia Kazan's film classic On the Waterfront (1954). He was known as John F. Hamilton to distinguish him from the much more prolific American film actor John Hamilton (who played "Perry White" on TV) and also from a British actor of youthful roles who worked in England and Europe in the 1930s.

Born in New York City on November 7, 1893, Hamilton was a graduate of Fordham University. His performing career began in vaudeville in 1916.

Broadway plays in which Hamilton appeared included Shore Leave (1922), Hell-bent Fer Heaven (1924), The Mongrel (1924), The Dagger (1925), Rockbound (1929), The Black Tower (1932), Ceiling Zero (1935), Iron Men (1936), Of Mice and Men (1937), Clash by Night (1941), The Day Will Come (1944), and Therese (1945).

For the last five years of Hamilton's life he lived in Englewood, New Jersey, at the Actors Fund Home. He died on July 11, 1967, at Bergen Pines Hospital in Paramus, New Jersey, aged 73.

== Filmography ==
Year	Title	Role	Notes
1926	Rainbow Riley	Halfwit	
1927	The Mountain Eagle	Edward Pettigrew	Hitchcock lost film
1927	The Masked Menace	The Half-Wit	
1929	The Great Gabbo	Neighbour	Uncredited
1939	Allegheny Uprising	Professor	
1940	The Saint's Double Trouble	Limpy	
1940	Gold Rush Maisie	Bert Davis	
1942	Men of Texas	Dwight Douglass	
1943	The Amazing Mrs. Holliday	Dr. Kirke	
1943	Shantytown	Mr. Gorty	
1943	Pilot No. 5	Mr. Pritchard	Uncredited
1943	Spy Train	Senior Conductor	Uncredited
1943	Headin' for God's Country	Hilary Higgins	
1947	Boomerang	Man in Barber Shop	Uncredited
1949	The Undercover Man	Police Desk Sergeant Shannon	
1954	On the Waterfront	Pops Doyle	
