= Film Weekly =

British film magazine (1928–1939)

- Ginger Rogers on the cover of the 3 May 1935 issue
- Editor: Herbert Thompson
- Frequency: Weekly (implied by title)
- Country: United Kingdom
- Language: English

Film Weekly was a popular film magazine published in the United Kingdom from 1928–1939.

== Background ==
Launched in 1928, the magazine became known for its gossipy interest in contemporary film stars. Columnist Nerina Shute became known for her "sweetly poisonous copy".

Film Weekly attracted a number of lawsuits from film professionals displeased at their portrayal by the magazine. The director Dinah Shurey sued for libel after her film The Last Post (1929) was not only panned in review but followed by an article by Shute questioning whether women were capable of directing films at all. Shurey won the action. The actress Alma Taylor also sued and won when Film Weekly said in 1932 that her career as an actress was over.

In 1930 the magazine sponsored a pair of film acting scholarships. The two winners (Cyril Butcher and Aileen Despard) went on to appear in the now lost Alfred Hitchcock short An Elastic Affair but did not subsequently enjoy lengthy careers, despite being placed under contract by British International Pictures.

Film Weekly merged with fan magazine Picturegoer in 1939. For much of its life it was edited by Herbert Thompson.

== Awards ==
The magazine held an annual reader ballot to determine the best film of the year and the best performance by an actor or actress in a British film. For 1936 these were won by The Ghost Goes West and Nova Pilbeam (for Tudor Rose) respectively.

== In fiction ==
Film Weekly features in the establishing shots of the film Rome Express (1932).

== See also ==
- Picturegoer
