= Mrs. O. F. Walton =

English children's writer (1849–1939)

Amy Catherine Walton (9 August 1849 – 5 July 1939), born Amy Catherine Deck and better known as Mrs O. F. Walton, was an English author of Christian children's books, mainly but not exclusively fictional. She was the daughter of an Anglican priest and married his curate, with whom she spent four years living in Jerusalem.

== Life ==
Amy was the daughter of John Deck (1815–1882), Vicar of St Stephen's Church, Spring Street, Hull, and Mary Ann Sanderson Gibson (1813–1903), a hymnist.

Her writings began with My Mates And I, written in 1870 but not published until 1873. Meanwhile her first published work was My Little Corner in 1872. In 1874 came one of her most famous books, Christie's Old Organ, which has been regularly reprinted up to the present day. It tells of orphaned Christie and his friend, an aged organ-grinder named Treffy.

The book was introduced into Japan in 1882 and published there in 1885 in a translation by Tajima Kashi, as one of the earliest books in Japan on the history of Christian and of children's literature. It was translated again in 1903 and 1994.

In 1875 Amy married Octavius Frank Walton, who was her father's curate at the time. It was under her husband's name, as Mrs O. F. Walton, that she would become better known. In the year of their marriage they moved to Jerusalem, where Octavius held a ministry in a church on Mount Zion until 1879. Meanwhile her book A Peep Behind The Scenes was published there in 1877. It tells the story of Rosalie, a child who works in a travelling theatre.

The Waltons lived at Cally, Kirkcudbrightshire, Scotland, for a time, while he worked in a chaplaincy for English textile workers there. From 1883 Octavius was in the ministry at the church of St Thomas's, York, moving to St Jude's, Wolverhampton, in 1893 and Leigh, Tonbridge, Kent, in 1906. There his wife became heavily involved in parish work, to the detriment of her writing. They retired in 1918, but soon returned to live in Leigh.

Amy Catherine Walton died in Tonbridge on 5 July 1939, of heart failure precipitated by a domestic fall.

== Still available ==
Although Amy Catherine Walton wrote many books, only A Peep Behind the Scenes and Christie's Old Organ that have remained well known. They continue to be available from the Lutterworth Press, successor to their original publisher, the Religious Tract Society.

== Works ==
- My Little Corner: A Book For Cottage Homes (1872)
- Little Dot And Her Friends (1873)
- My Mates And I (1873)
- Throw Me Overboard (1873)
- Christie's Old Organ; Or, "Home, Sweet Home" (1874)
- A Peep Behind The Scenes (1877)
- Saved At Sea: A Lighthouse Story (1879)
- Was I Right? (1879)
- The Story Of A Geranium (1879?)
- Angel's Christmas (1880)
- Little Faith; Or, The Child Of The Toy Stall (1880)
- Our Home In Heaven (1881)
- Nobody Loves Me (1883)
- The Four Little Preachers: A New Year's Address To Sunday Scholars (1884)
- Olive's Story; Or, Life At Ravenscliffe (1884)
- Shadows: Scenes And Incidents In The Life Of An Old Arm-Chair (1884)
- Taken Or Left (1885)
- Launch The Life Boat! (1886)
- Poppy's Presents (1886)
- Winter's Folly (1889)
- The King's Cup-Bearer (1891)
- Nemo; Or, The Wonderful Door (1893)
- Elisha: The Man Of Abel-Meholah (1897)
- "Our Gracious Queen": Jubilee Pictures And Stories From Her Majesty's Life (1897)
- Christie, The King's Servant (1898)
- Olive's School Days (1900)
- Whiter Than Snow (1900)
- Audrey; Or, Children Of Light (1904)
- The Mysterious House (1904)
- Doctor Forester (1906)
- Golden Threads For Life's Weaving (1906)
- The Lost Clue (1907)
- Unbeaten Paths In Sacred Story (1907)
- Strange Diana (1919)
