= Owd Bob (disambiguation) =

Owd Bob (or Bob, Son of Battle) is an 1898 novel by Alfred Ollivant.

Owd Bob may also refer to:

- Owd Bob (1924 film), a British film adaptation
- Owd Bob (1938 film), a British film adaptation
- Owd Bob (1998 film), a British-Canadian film adaptation

== See also ==
- Thunder in the Valley (film), a 1947 American film adaptation
- Old Bob, a 19th-century driving horse
