= The Little Minister =

The Little Minister may refer to:

- The Little Minister (novel) an 1891 work by J.M. Barrie
- The Little Minister (play), an 1897 play based on the novel, which was a 1975 BBC Play of the Month
- The Little Minister (1913 film), a silent American film adaptation featuring Clara Kimball Young
- The Little Minister (1915 film), a silent British film adaptation
- The Little Minister (1921 film), a silent American film adaptation
- The Little Minister (1922 film), a silent American film adaptation
- The Little Minister (1934 film), a 1934 American film adaptation
