= A Bunch of Violets =

A Bunch of Violets may refer to:

- A Bunch of Violets (play), a play by Sydney Grundy
- A Bunch of Violets (film), a film directed by Frank Wilson
