= The Coal King =

1915 British silent film by Percy Nash

The Coal King is a 1915 British silent drama film directed by Percy Nash and starring Douglas Cox, May Lynn and Frank Tennant. The script was based on a play by Ernest Martin and Fewlass Llewellyn.

== Cast ==
- Douglas Cox as Sir Reginald Harford
- May Lynn as Ann Roberts
- Frank Tennant as Walter Harford
- Daisy Cordell as Grace Shirley
- Gregory Scott as Tom Roberts
- Douglas Payne as James Hawker
- Jack Denton as Jim Matthews
- Joan Ritz as Araminta
- John Marlborough East as William Shirley
- Helen Lainsbury as Mrs Shirley
