= Hetty Spiers =

British author and screenwriter

Henrietta Elizabeth Spiers (6 August 1881 – 1973) was a British costume designer for the theatre and silent films, a screenwriter, and an author. Columbia University's Women Film Pioneers Project counts her among those on its list of 'Unhistoricized Women Film Pioneers'.

== Early life ==
Hetty Spiers was born in Toxteth in Liverpool in 1881 the daughter of Amelia Matilda née Bromley and Kaufmann Charles Spiers, of German and Irish descent. From a family of writers, her father was the drama, music, and art critic for the Liverpool Daily Post while her older brother Kaufmann Charles St. George Spiers Jr. was a reporter, correspondent writer, and book reviewer. He also wrote the play If Youth But Knew, which was made as a silent film in 1926 starring Godfrey Tearle and Mary Odette. By 1901 her parents were separated and Spiers was living with her mother and brother at 121 Stockwell Park Road in Lambeth in London where she was listed as a 'chorister' and her brother as a 'journalist'. Her father was boarding at an address in Clapham; he died the same year. By 1911 she and her brother and mother were living in Brixton in London where Hetty Spiers was a 28-year old art student at the London County Council School of Art. On leaving college later in 1911 Spiers worked at the London Opera House where, in a later interview, she said she designed the costumes for the operas.

== Marriage ==
Spiers married the screenwriter and director Langford Reed at Lambeth in London in 1912. Their daughter, the actress Joan Mary Langford Reed made her screen début aged two years in The Heart of a Rose (1919), written by her father. She went on to appear in Testimony (1920), The Wonderful Wooing (1925), and The Luck of the Navy (1927). She was the first winner of the ‘Navana Juvenile Beauty Competition’ in 1922 and in 1923 was featured in the Glaxo Baby Food advertising campaign.

== Writing career ==
For the Clarendon Film Company, Spiers wrote the screenplay for the comedy Sister Susie’s Sewing Shirts for Soldiers (1917) and the crime film Queen of My Heart (1917). In 1919 her article 'Costume Designing for Cinematography' was published in The Bioscope and she was awarded a prize for Best Costume Representing a Stoll Film at the Crystal Palace Carnival in 1921 for The Fruitful Vine starring a young Basil Rathbone.

With her husband Spiers co-authored the books Daphne Goes Down (1925), Who's Who in Filmland (1928 and 1931), and The Mantle of Methuselah: A Farcical Novel (1939). Also with her husband she wrote the screenplay for Potter's Clay (1922), a silent film directed by H. Grenville-Taylor and Douglas Payne and starring Ellen Terry. She and her husband adapted the screenplay into a novel of the same name in 1923.

Spiers died aged 91 in 1973 in Richmond-upon-Thames.
