= Langford Reed =

British writer and filmmaker

Langford Reed (11 November 1878 – 8 March 1954) was a British author, writer and collector of limericks, scriptwriter, director and actor of the silent film era.

== Biography ==
Reed was born in Clapham in London in 1878 as Herbert Langford Reed, the son of Emma Mary née Williams and John Herbert Reed, a manufacturer of hosiery. 'Bertie' Reed was educated in Clapham and at Hove College. In 1911 aged 32 he was a journalist living with his parents with the family home now being a boarding house. He married the theatre and film costume designer Henrietta 'Hetty' Elizabeth Spiers (1881-1973) at Lambeth in London in 1912. Their daughter, the actress Joan Mary Langford Reed (1917-1997) made her screen début aged 2 years in The Heart of a Rose (1919), written by her father. She went on to appear in Testimony (1920), The Wonderful Wooing (1925) and The Luck of the Navy (1927). She was the first winner of the ‘Navana Juvenile Beauty Competition’ in 1922 and in 1923 featured in the Glaxo Baby Food advertising campaign.

During World War I Langford Reed served as a private in the Middlesex Regiment with the British Army in France. He was a prolific scriptwriter for silent film and was the author of a number of books of 'clean' or 'laundered' limericks which he collected or wrote and various of which were illustrated by H. M. Bateman among others, including The Complete Limerick Book (1924); The Indiscreet Limerick Book (1925); Nonsense Verses - An Anthology (editor, c1925); Daphne Goes Down (1925), written with his wife; Further Nonsense: Verse and Prose by Lewis Carroll (editor, 1926); Nonsense Tales for the Young (1927); Who's Who in Filmland (1928 and 1931) with Hetty Spiers; The Life of Lewis Carroll (1932); Limericks for the Beach, Bathroom and Boudoir (1933); Mr Punch's Limerick Book (editor, 1934); The Limerick Calendar (1935); Sausages & Sundials: A Book of Nonsense Ballads (c1935); The Complete Rhyming Dictionary (1936); My Limerick Book (1937); Another Limerick Calendar (c1939); with his wife Hetty Spiers he wrote The Mantle of Methuselah: A Farcical Novel (1939); and The Writer's Rhyming Dictionary (1961).

A prolific film writer and director, he was known for The Tempest (1908); wrote the intertitles for and edited Chase Me Charlie (1918), a seven-reel montage of Charlie Chaplin's Essanay films released in Great Britain; The Heart of a Rose (1919); A Lass o' the Looms (1919) and Potter's Clay (1922), the screenplay of which was adapted with his wife in to a novel in 1923. A Freemason, he joined the Authors' Lodge No. 3456 in 1921.

In his later years he lived at 59 Carlton Hill in St John's Wood with his wife Henrietta Elizabeth Reed.

He died in Hampstead in London in 1954. In his will he left £110.

== Filmography ==
=== Actor ===
- 1906: Saved by a Lie directed by Percy Stow
- 1907: A Knight Errant directed by J. H. Martin

=== Scriptwriter ===
- 1906: Saved by a Lie directed by Percy Stow
- 1907: Disturbing His Rest directed by Percy Stow
- 1907: A Knight Errant directed by J. H. Martin
- 1907: The Wreck of the Mary Jane directed by Percy Stow
- 1907: The Story of a Modern Mother directed by Percy Stow
- 1907: Adventures of a Bath Chair directed by Percy Stow
- 1907: An Awkward Situation directed by Percy Stow
- 1907: The Water Babies directed by Percy Stow
- 1907: The Pied Piper directed by Percy Stow
- 1907: That's Not Right: Watch Me! directed by Percy Stow
- 1907]: An Anxious Day for Mother directed by Percy Stow
- 1908: The Little Waif and the Captain's Daughter directed by Percy Stow
- 1908: The Captain's Wives directed by Percy Stow
- 1908: Three Maiden Ladies and a Bull directed by Percy Stow
- 1908: Three Suburban Sportsmen and a Hat directed by Percy Stow
- 1908: Mr. Jones Has a Tile Loose directed by Percy Stow
- 1908: If Women Were Policemen directed by Percy Stow
- 1908: The Old Composer and the Prima Donna directed by Percy Stow
- 1908: Follow Your Leader and the Master Follows Last directed by Percy Stow
- 1908: The Cavalier's Wife directed by Percy Stow
- 1908: Robin Hood and His Merry Men directed by Percy Stow
- 1908: Nancy directed by Percy Stow
- 1908: Algy's Yachting Party directed by Percy Stow
- 1908: The Tempest directed by Percy Stow
- The Puritan Maid and the Royalist Refugee directed by Percy Stow
- 1908: A Modern Cinderella directed by Percy Stow
- 1908: When the Man in the Moon Seeks a Wife directed by Percy Stow
- 1908: The Old Favourite and the Ugly Golliwog directed by Percy Stow
- 1908: The Martyrdom of Thomas A Becket directed by Percy Stow
- 1908: Ib and Little Christina directed by Percy Stow
- 1909: The Love of a Nautch Girl directed by Percy Stow
- 1909: The Crafty Usurper and the Young King directed by Percy Stow
- 1909: His Work or His Wife directed by Percy Stow
- 1909: Hard Times directed by Percy Stow
- 1914: The Temptation of Joseph directed by Percy Stow
- 1914: The Rival Anarchists
- 1914: The Little God
- 1914: The Catch of the Season
- 1915: The Angel of the Ward directed by Tom Watts
- 1918: Chase Me Charlie
- 1919: The Heart of a Rose directed by Jack Denton
- 1919: A Lass o' the Looms directed by Jack Denton
- 1920: The Woman Hater directed by Sidney M. Goldin
- 1920: The Bird Fancier directed by Sidney M. Goldin
- 1922: Potter's Clay directed by H. Grenville-Taylor and Douglas Payne
- 1945 He Snoops to Conquer (contributor)

=== Director ===
- 1914: The Temptation of Joseph
- 1914: The Rival Anarchists
- 1914: The Little God
- 1914: The Catch of the Season
- 1914: The Cleansing of a Dirty Dog
- 1918: Chase Me Charlie
