= The Harbour Lights (1914 film) =

1914 film

The Harbour Lights is a 1914 British silent drama film directed by Percy Nash and starring Gerald Lawrence, Mercy Hatton and Daisy Cordell. It is an adaptation of the Victorian melodramatic play The Harbour Lights by George R. Sims.

== Cast ==
- Gerald Lawrence - Lt David Kingsley
- Mercy Hatton - Dora Vane
- Daisy Cordell - Lina Nelson
- Fred Morgan - Nicholas Morland
- Gregory Scott - Frank Morland
- Douglas Payne - Mark Helstone
- Joan Ritz - Peggy Chudleigh
- John Marlborough East - Capt. Nelson
- May Lynn - Mrs. Helstone
- Brian Daly - Tom Dossiter
- Bryan Powley - Capt. Hardy
- Helen Lainsbury - Polly
