= Hobson's Choice (play) =

Play by Harold Brighouse

- Written by: Harold Brighouse

Premiere
- Date: November 2, 1915
- Place: Princess Theatre

Hobson's Choice is a play by Harold Brighouse whose title is taken from the popular expression, Hobson's choice, meaning no choice at all.

The first production was at the Princess Theatre in New York on November 2, 1915. It then transferred to London on 24 June 1916 at the Apollo Theatre, before moving to the Prince of Wales Theatre on 20 November 1916 (starring Norman McKinnel, as Henry Hobson, Edyth Goodall as Maggie Hobson and Joe Nightingale as Willie Mossop). It was performed by the National Theatre at the Old Vic, London in 1964 (starring Michael Redgrave, Joan Plowright and Frank Finlay.) The play was adapted for film several times and as a Broadway musical. The Crucible Theatre Sheffield staged a revival in June 2011 directed by Christopher Luscombe and starring Barrie Rutter, Zoe Waites and Philip McGinley.In June 2016, Hobson's Choice opened at The Vaudeville Theatre, running until 10 September 2016. Martin Shaw played Hobson.

The story is set in Salford in 1880. It bears many resemblances to the stories of Cinderella and King Lear including a deceased mother; three daughters, two of whom are pretty and frivolous, the third of whom is clever and hardworking; and a fairy godmother (Mrs. Hepworth).

== Roles ==
- Henry Horatio Hobson
- Maggie Hobson (Hobson's oldest daughter)
- Alice Hobson (Hobson's daughter)
- Vickey Hobson (Hobson's daughter)
- Mrs. Hepworth (a wealthy customer of Hobson's)
- William Mossop (Maggie Hobson's conquest, with whom she eventually develops love)
- Albert Prosser (a lawyer; in love with Alice )
- Fred Beenstock (in love with Vickey )

== Plot ==
A shoemaker, Henry Hobson, has three daughters: Maggie, Alice and Vickey. The daughters work in the shop unpaid. Hobson spends his time drinking with the fellow members of the masons at the Moonrakers pub.

One day, Mrs Hepworth, a rich customer of Hobson, demands to know who made her boots: it is Hobson's underpaid bootmaker, Will Mossop. She insists that all her and her daughters' boots must from now on be made by Will, and tells him to inform her if ever he should leave Hobson's. Maggie, who is a talented businesswoman and considered too old and plain to marry, proposes marriage to Will. Will reluctantly agrees. When Hobson comes back, she tells him that she intends to marry Will, but he laughs at her, and threatens to beat Will for courting her. At this, Will leaves the shop, and Maggie goes with him. They borrow £100 from Mrs Hepworth, set up a shop on their own, and marry as soon as the banns of marriage have been called.

A month later, Hobson falls into the warehouse belonging to the father of Fred Beenstock, Vickey's love. Maggie comes back to tell her sisters that she is going to marry them off herself. Hobson has refused to settle any money on them, without which they are unlikely to find decent husbands. With the help of lawyer Albert Prosser, Alice's love, they issue a writ claiming damages from Hobson for trespass, damage to corn sacks and spying on trade secrets. Hobson eventually agrees to pay, the money is settled on the girls and they can now get married.

Thanks to Will's skill as a bootmaker and Maggie's business acumen, their shop is very successful and, within a year, they have taken nearly all of Hobson's trade. Hobson is almost bankrupt and drinking himself to death. After an attack of delirium tremens, he asks each of his daughters to look after him. They all refuse, but eventually Maggie agrees to do so provided that Will takes over his business, with Hobson remaining as a sleeping partner only.

== Adaptations ==
=== Film and television ===
The play has been filmed several times, originally as a silent film in 1920, with Joan Ritz as Maggie, Arthur Pitt as her father and Joe Nightingale reprising his stage appearance as Mossop. It was filmed again with sound in 1931, with James Harcourt as Hobson, Frank Pettingell as Mossop, Joan Maude as Alice, and Viola Lyel as Maggie. The best-known film version is that of 1954 directed by David Lean. It starred Charles Laughton as Hobson and Brenda De Banzie as Maggie. John Mills played Will Mossop, and Prunella Scales made her second film appearance as Vicky Hobson.

In 1962, Granada Television produced a 90-minute "television play" version. It was first broadcast by ITV on Tuesday 25th September, 1962 (between 9.15pm and 10.45pm). Directed by Stuart Latham, this adaptation formed part of ITV's ongoing "Play of the Week" television anthology series. The story was adapted by Gerald Savory and the Production Designer was Roy Stonehouse. It featured a cast that included John Barrie as Henry Hobson, Patricia Routledge as Maggie Hobson, and a young Michael Caine as Willie Mossop.

It was Americanized in the 1983 TV version, set in 1914 New Orleans, starring Jack Warden as Hobson, Sharon Gless as Maggie, and Richard Thomas as Will. It was broadcast on CBS TV on 21 December 1983.

=== Broadway ===
The 1966 Broadway musical Walking Happy is based on the play.

=== Ballet ===
An English ballet adaptation of the same title, with choreography by David Bintley and music by Paul Reade, premiered on 13 February 1989 by Sadler's Wells Royal Ballet at Covent Garden, London. A video production of the ballet has been seen on television broadcasts and released on DVD.
