= Sally Bishop =

Sally Bishop may refer to:

- Sally Bishop, a Romance, a 1910 novel by the British writer E. Temple Thurston
  - Sally Bishop (1916 film), a British silent film adaptation of the novel, directed by George Pearson
  - Sally Bishop (1924 film), a British silent film adaptation directed by Maurice Elvey
  - Sally Bishop (1932 film), a British romantic drama film adaptation directed by T. Hayes Hunter
