= Thunder in the Valley =

Thunder in the Valley may refer to:

- An annual motorcycle rally in Johnstown, Pennsylvania, USA
- A fireworks show in Crowsnest Pass, Alberta, Canada
- Thunder in the Valley (film), a 1947 film
