= The Little Minister (1915 film) =

- Directed by: Percy Nash
- Based on: The Little Minister; 1891 novel and play by J. M. Barrie
- Starring: Joan Ritz; Gregory Scott; Henry Vibart
- Release date: 1915
- Country: United Kingdom
- Language: English

The Little Minister is a 1915 British silent romance film directed by Percy Nash and starring Joan Ritz, Gregory Scott and Henry Vibart. It was based on an 1891 novel The Little Minister by J.M. Barrie which was subsequently turned into a play The Little Minister in 1897. It was one of five film adaptations of the story.

== Cast ==
- Joan Ritz - Babbie
- Gregory Scott - Gavin Dishart
- Henry Vibart - Rob Dow
- Fay Davis - Margaret Dishart
- May Whitty - Nanny Webster
- Douglas Payne - Lord Rintoul
- Frank Tennant - Captain Halliwell
- John Marlborough East - Thomas Whamond
- Brian Daly - Snecky Hobart
- Douglas Cox - Silva Tosh
- Alfred Wilmore - Micah Dow
