= The Little Minister (play) =

1897 play by J. M. Barrie

1897 New York production: from left, Kate Ten Eyck, Robert Edeson and Maude Adams

The Little Minister is a four-act play by J. M. Barrie, loosely based on his earlier novel of the same name. It was first given in Washington D. C. and then New York in September 1897, and was presented in London in November of the same year. It tells the story of a spirited aristocratic young woman and a conscientious young pastor in a Scottish town in the aftermath of Luddite riots, and their victory over a mean-minded army captain seeking to punish the townspeople.

== Background ==
Barrie's first theatrical success was in 1892, when his comedy Walker, London began a run of 511 performances. The Little Minister, loosely based on a novel of the same title he had published in 1891, was his next play.

== First productions ==
The play opened in Washington D. C. on 13 September 1897, produced by Charles Frohman. The production opened in New York at the Empire Theatre on 27 September and ran for 300 performances. The London production opened at the Haymarket Theatre on 6 November 1897. It ran for 330 performances. Sir Alexander Mackenzie composed music for the production, and his overture became a popular stand-alone orchestral piece.

=== Casts ===
Role	Washington and New York	London
Earl of Rintoul	Eugene Jepson	W. G. Elliott/E. Holman Clark
The Rev Gavin Dishart	Robert Edeson	Cyril Maude/Clarence Blakiston
Captain Halliwell	Guy Standing	C. M. Hallard
Thomas Whamond	William H. Thompson	Brandon Thomas
Snecky Hobart	Wallace Jackson	Mark Kinghorne/Ernest Hendrie
Silva Tosh	Norman Campbell	F. H. Tyler
Andrew Mealmaker	R. Peyton Carter	E. Holman Clark/Stanley Lathbury
Rob Dow	George Fawcett	Sydney Valentine
Joe Cruickshanks	Thomas Valentine	Eardley Turner
Sergeant Davidson	Wilfred Buckland	Clarence Blakiston/Sutton Barnes
Thwaites	Frederick Spencer	H. H. Welch
Micah Dow	Jessie Mackaye	Sydney Fairbrother/Joan Burnett
Nannie Webster	Kate Ten Eyck	Mrs E. H. Brooke
Felice	Margaret Gordon	Nina Cadiz
Jean	Nell Stone Fulton	Mary MacKenzie
Lady Babbie	Maude Adams	Winifred Emery

Maude Adams as Lady Babbie

== Plot ==
The Reverend Gavin Dishart is a diligent young nonconformist minister in the Scottish weaving town of Thrums in the early nineteenth century. He is supported by four church elders, conscientious but not dour Presbyterians: they respect and appreciate him, but cause him some trouble. There was a recent Luddite riot in Thrums, and the police were called to calm things down, but were overwhelmed by the crowd. The army, under the command of Captain Halliwell, came to arrest the leaders; and the elders of the church now keep watch at night to warn the town of the approach of the soldiers with three blows of horns, so that the leaders would have time to slip away.

Lady Babbie, the daughter of Lord Rintoul, the local landowner, is sought in marriage by Captain Halliwell, whom she neither loves nor likes. To save the weavers and thwart Halliwell's plans, she disguises herself as a Romany, slips out of Rintoul Hall through a secret passage and appears in the woods in front of the stunned Gavin Dishart, who falls in love with her at first sight. She cannot produce a sound on the alarm horn and Dishart, innocent of the meaning of the blowing, does so for her. The town is in turmoil, and the leaders escape. Babbie incites the population to resist the army. Halliwell is determined to find and punish the Romany who ruined his plans; and Dishart falls more and more in love with Babbie, whose aristocratic identity he does not realise.

The elders begin to believe that their respected minister is going off the rails with an Egyptian. Babbie slips back to Rintoul Hall, where she finds Dishart, who has come to plead for pardon for the Romany. Captain Halliwell treats Dishart with contempt, and when the minister confesses that it was he who blew the warning horn, the captain asks Lord Rintoul to arrest him. But soon the captain comes up with a better plan for revenge. To make it easier for the Romany to escape into the woods, Dishart pretended that she was his wife, and his testimony to witnesses to that effect corresponds under the Scottish law at that time to a binding marriage. Halliwell advises Lord Rintoul to announce publicly Dishart's union with the Egyptian. The facts are established by the testimony of a sergeant who recognises Lady Babbie as the Romany of the forest. Halliwell is furious to find that his own malice has made Babbie someone else's wife. Lord Rintoul, too, is angry at first but Halliwell's discomfiture soon puts him in a good humour and he gives the marriage of his daughter and Dishart his blessing.

== Reception ==
Fay Compton and Owen Nares, 1923

The play was well received on both sides of the Atlantic. The Era reported, "The Little Minister at the Empire Theatre has engaged the attention of the critics and the interest of the public to a greater degree than any play of recent production. While the interest centred largely upon the performance of Miss Maude Adams, the play itself has commanded exceptional interest".

In London The Times said:

A new and original theme has thus been treated by Mr Barrie with a dramatic skill, a humour, and a sense of character that cannot fail to be welcome to the general public, whose taste, despite, or perhaps because of, their grounding in Ibsenism, strongly inclines for the time being to the romantic and the sentimental. The Little Minister is a play that refreshes and enlivens. The most hardened realist must feel the better for breathing the pure and sweet atmosphere that envelops it.

== Revivals ==
In London the play was revived at the Duke of York's Theatre in September 1914 starring Marie Lohr and Donald Calthrop and at the Queen's Theatre in 1923 starring Fay Compton and Owen Nares.

In New York, Frohman revived the piece in 1904 with Adams and Arthur Byron in the leads. Another revival in 1916 starred Adams with Dallas Anderson. A shortl-lived revival in 1925 starred Ruth Chatterton and Ralph Forbes.

== Adaptations ==
The BBC has broadcast adaptations of the play for both radio and television. A 1945 version on BBC Radio featured Yvonne Hills and James Cairncross; a 1953 radio adaptation featured Hills and Bryden Murdoch; in a 1955 BBC Television transmission Joy Parker played Babbie and Emrys Jones, Dishart; Helen Mirren and Ian Ogilvy starred in a television adaption in 1975.

There have been several film versions of The Little Minister: a version released in 1912 by the American Vitagraph Company, and starring Clara Kimball Young as Babbie; a British silent from 1915 with Joan Ritz and Gregory Scott; a Paramount production of 1921 with Betty Compson as Babbie and George Hackathorne as Gavin; a 1922 Vitagraph version with Alice Calhoun and James W. Morrison, and an RKO talkie of 1934, directed by Richard Wallace, with Katharine Hepburn and John Beal.

== Sources ==
- Gaye, Freda, ed. (1967). Who's Who in the Theatre (fourteenth ed.). London: Sir Isaac Pitman and Sons. OCLC 5997224.
- Geduld, Harry M. (1971). Sir James Barrie. New York: Twayne. OCLC 138650.
- Wearing, J. P. (1976). The London Stage, 1890–1899: A Calendar of Plays and Players. Metuchen: Scarecrow Press. ISBN 0810809109.
