= The Call of the Sea =

The Call of the Sea may refer to:

- The Call of the Sea (1951 film), an East German drama film
- The Call of the Sea (1930 film), a British adventure film
- The Call of the Sea (1927 film), a Polish silent romance film
- The Call of the Sea (1919 film), a British silent drama film

== See also ==
- Call of the Sea, an adventure video game
