= Mary Pickford (disambiguation) =

Mary Pickford (1892–1979) was a Canadian-American film actress and producer.

Mary Pickford may also refer to:

- Ermeline, actress called the "Mary Pickford of India"
- Mary Pickford Award
- Mary Pickford (cocktail)
- Mary Pickford (physiologist) (1902–2002), British physiologist
- Mary Pickford (politician) (1884–1934), British politician
- Mary Pickford Theater
- "Mary Pickford (Used to Eat Roses)", song by Katie Melua
- Stella Muir, actress known as the English Mary Pickford

== See also ==
- A Kiss from Mary Pickford, 1927 Soviet silent film by Sergei Komarov and Vadim Shershenevich
