= The Old Wives' Tale (film) =

1921 film

- Directed by: Denison Clift
- Written by: Denison Clift
- Starring: Fay Compton; Florence Turner; Henry Victor; Mary Brough
- Production company: Ideal Film Company
- Distributed by: Ideal Film Company
- Release date: December 1921
- Country: United Kingdom
- Language: English

The Old Wives' Tale is a 1921 British drama film directed by Denison Clift and starring Fay Compton, Florence Turner and Henry Victor. It is based on the 1908 novel The Old Wives' Tale by Arnold Bennett.

== Cast ==
- Fay Compton as Sophie Barnes
- Florence Turner as Constance Barnes
- Henry Victor as Gerald
- Francis Lister as Cyril Povey
- Mary Brough as Mrs Barnes
- Joseph R. Tozer as Chirac
- Norman Page as Samuel Povey
- Drusilla Wills as Maggie
- Tamara Karsavina as Dancer
