= I Killed the Count (film) =

- Spanish poster
- Directed by: Frederic Zelnik
- Written by: Lawrence Huntington
- Based on: I Killed the Count by Alec Coppel
- Produced by: Isadore Goldsmith
- Starring: Ben Lyon; Syd Walker; Terence de Marney
- Cinematography: Bryan Langley
- Music by: Hans May
- Production company: Grafton Films
- Distributed by: Grand National Pictures; Monogram Pictures (US)
- Release date: 6 May 1939
- Running time: 69 minutes
- Country: United Kingdom
- Language: English

I Killed the Count (also known as Who Is Guilty?) is a 1939 British mystery film directed by Frederic Zelnik and starring Ben Lyon, Syd Walker, Terence de Marney. It was written by Lawrence Huntington and shot at Highbury Studios.

== Synopsis ==
Cockney comedian Syd Walker plays it more or less straight as Scotland Yard Detective Inspector Davidson, at present trying to determine who murdered the much-hated Count Mattoni. The dilemma isn't that the Detective is suffering from a lack of witnesses. In fact, four different people come forth to confess to the killing – each of them with plenty of motive and opportunity.

== Cast ==
- Ben Lyon as Bernard Froy
- Syd Walker as Detective Inspector Davidson
- Terence De Marney as Detective Sergeant Raines
- Barbara Blair as Renée la Lune
- Athole Stewart as Lord Sorrington
- Antoinette Cellier as Louise Rogers
- Leslie Perrins as Count Mattoni
- David Burns as Diamond
- Ronald Shiner as Mullet
- Aubrey Mallalieu as Johnson
- Kathleen Harrison as Polly
- Gus McNaughton as Martin

== Reception ==
The Monthly Film Bulletin wrote: "The film flows with an easy continuity and is distinguished by its clever dialogue and acting. That one is not conscious of the photography or recording is indicative of its quality. Mr. Walker's fruity voice is a delight."

Kine Weekly wrote: "There are no big thrills and no suspense, the smart entertainment lies in the versatile characterisation, the intriguing ingenuity of the plot, and the skilful cultivation of the unexpected. Although there is considerably more dialogue than action, neither interest nor entertainment flags. Crisp humour is an integral part of the proceedings."

Variety said after "a casual start, the story warms up and becomes exciting and entertainment."
