= A Rogue's Wife =

- Directed by: Percy Nash
- Starring: Gregory Scott; Daisy Cordell; Joan Ritz
- Production company: Neptune Film Company
- Distributed by: Walturdaw
- Release date: November 1915
- Country: United Kingdom
- Languages: Silent; English intertitles

A Rogue's Wife is a 1915 British silent crime film directed by Percy Nash and starring Gregory Scott, Daisy Cordell and Joan Ritz.

== Cast ==
- Gregory Scott
- Daisy Cordell
- Joan Ritz
- Frank Tennant

== Bibliography ==
- Palmer, Scott. British Film Actors' Credits, 1895-1987. McFarland, 1988.
