= A London Flat Mystery =

- Directed by: Walter West
- Starring: Vera Cornish; George Foley; Reginald Stevens; Constance Backner
- Production company: Broadwest Film Company
- Release date: 1915
- Country: United Kingdom

A London Flat Mystery (also known as The Mystery of a London Flat) is a 1915 British silent crime film directed by Walter West and starring Vera Cornish, George Foley and Reginald Stevens.

== Plot ==
A Scotland Yard detective believes two recent murders are linked and sets out to hunt down the killer.

== Cast ==
- Vera Cornish as Margaret Forster
- George Foley as Bentley
- Reginald Stevens as Bob Pritchard
- Constance Backner as Mrs Hooper
- Richard Norton as Bill Hooper
- Andrew Jackson as Leo Scott
- Hugh Croise as Inspector
