= Thunder in the Valley (film) =

1947 directed by Louis King

- Theatrical release poster
- Directed by: Louis King
- Screenplay by: Jerome Cady
- Based on: Owd Bob by Alfred Ollivant
- Produced by: Robert Bassler
- Starring: Lon McCallister; Peggy Ann Garner; Edmund Gwenn
- Cinematography: Charles G. Clarke
- Edited by: Nick DeMaggio
- Music by: Cyril J. Mockridge
- Color process: Technicolor
- Production company: 20th Century Fox
- Distributed by: 20th Century Fox
- Release date: November 1, 1947
- Running time: 103 minutes
- Country: United States
- Language: English

Thunder in the Valley is a 1947 American Technicolor drama film directed by Louis King and starring Lon McCallister, Peggy Ann Garner and Edmund Gwenn. It is based on the 1898 novel Owd Bob by Alfred Ollivant, which has previously been adapted into a 1938 film of the same title. The film was produced and distributed by 20th Century Fox and cost a reported $1.9 million. It was released in Britain under the alternative title Bob, Son of Battle.

== Plot ==
A crockerty old sheepherder, Adam MacAdam, loves his prize collie dog, but little else, not even his son David. But David, with the help of a neighbor's daughter, Maggie Moore, raises his own prize dog and beats out his father in a contest.

== Cast ==
- Lon McCallister as David MacAdam
- Peggy Ann Garner as Maggie Moore
- Edmund Gwenn as Adam MacAdam
- Reginald Owen as James Moore
- Charles Irwin as Long Kirby
- Leyland Hodgson as Ferguson
- Norma Varden as Lady Eleanor
- J. Farrell MacDonald as McPherson - Innkeeper
- John Rogers as MacKenzie
- Houseley Stevenson as Angus MacIvor
- Jean Prescott as Mrs. Elizabeth Moore
- David Thursby as Samuel Thornton
- Edgar Norton as Parson Leggy Hornbut
- James Finlayson as Court Judge
- Al Ferguson as Bailiff
- Mae Marsh as Flower Vendor
- Douglas Gerrard as Villager

== Production ==
Parts of the film were shot in Duck Creek, Strawberry Valley, Strawberry Point, Kanab Canyon, Navajo Lake, and Blue Springs in Utah.

Peggy Cummins was initially cast in the lead female role following her being moved off the production of Forever Amber.
