= Betty Hall (actress) =

Early twentieth-century child actress

Betty Hall was an early twentieth-century child film actress. She is credited in four silent films.

== Filmography ==
- A Lass o' the Looms (1919) as Girl
- The Black Spider (1920) as Irene Carfour
- The Sting of the Lash (1921) as Crissy (6 years)
- The First Woman (1922) as Marie
