= Hobson's Choice (1920 film) =

1920 film

Hobson's Choice poster

Hobson's Choice is a 1920 British comedy drama film directed by Percy Nash and starring Joe Nightingale, Joan Ritz and Arthur Pitt. A Salford bootmaker is irritated to learn his daughter is to marry one of his cobblers, and his outrage grows when they set up a successful shop which challenges his own for business. It is the first film based on the 1915 play Hobson's Choice by Harold Brighouse.
