= Diane (1929 film) =

1929 film

- Directed by: Erich Waschneck
- Written by: Hans Rameau; Rolf E. Vanloo
- Produced by: Olga Chekhova; Robert Wüllner
- Starring: Olga Chekhova; Pierre Blanchar; Henry Victor
- Cinematography: Friedl Behn-Grund
- Music by: Alexander Laszlo
- Production company: Tschechowa Film
- Distributed by: Bavaria Film
- Release date: 23 April 1929
- Running time: 85 minutes
- Country: Germany
- Languages: Silent; German intertitles

Diane (German: Diane – Die Geschichte einer Pariserin, lit. 'Diane, the Story of a Parisian') is a 1929 German silent film directed by Erich Waschneck and starring Olga Chekhova, Pierre Blanchar, and Henry Victor.

The film's sets were designed by the art director André Andrejew.

== Cast ==
- Olga Chekhova as Diane Mervil
- Pierre Blanchar as Leutnant Gatson Mervil
- Henry Victor as Oberst Guy de Lasalle
- Peter Voß as Kapitän Rimbaud
- Hans Adalbert Schlettow as Rittmeister Graf Orlaff
- Marion Gerth as Zofe
- Boris de Fast as General Fürst Gagarin
- Hubert von Meyerinck as Tichon, Kammerdiener
- Alexej Bondireff as Regimentsarzt
- Ekkehard Arendt
- Gaston Briese
- Otto Kronburger
- Theodor Loos
- Emil Heyse as Hanns Schuster
- Mikhail Rasumny
- Hermann Speelmans

== Bibliography ==
- Beevor, Antony (2014). The Mystery of Olga Chekhova: The True Story of a Family Torn Apart by Revolution and War. London: Penguin Books. ISBN 978-0-14-192594-3.
