= Daisy Cordell =

British actress

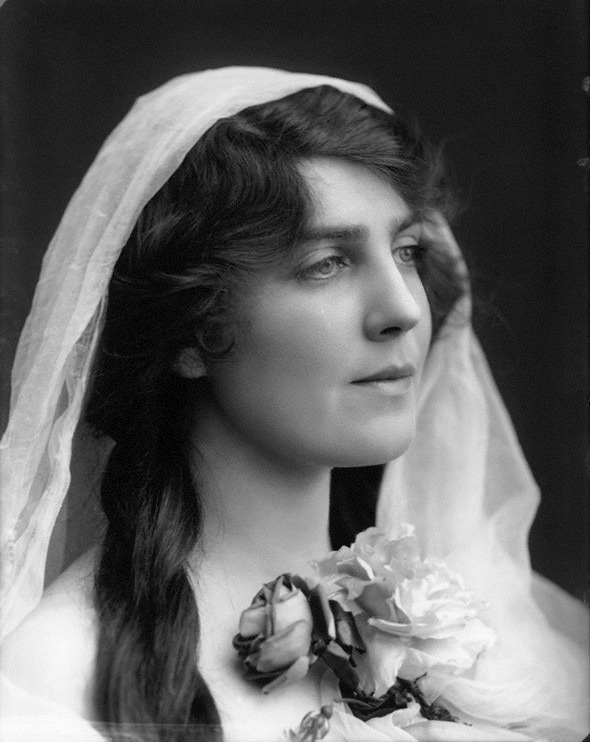
Cordell in 1914

Daisy Cordell was a British actress of the silent era. She was born in Hong Kong and died in Tunbridge Wells, Kent, England. She was married to the actor Evelyn Roberts.

== Selected filmography ==
- The Harbour Lights (1914)
- In the Ranks (1914)
- The Coal King (1915)
- A Rogue's Wife (1915)
- Master and Man (1915)
- The Romany Rye (1915)
- Disraeli (1916)
- The Life of a London Actress (1919)
