= Owd Bob (1938 film) =

- Original trade ad
- Directed by: Robert Stevenson
- Written by: J.B. Williams; Michael Hogan
- Based on: the novel Owd Bob: The Grey Dog of Kenmuir by Alfred Ollivant
- Starring: Will Fyffe
- Cinematography: Jack E. Cox
- Edited by: R.E. Dearing
- Music by: Charles Williams (uncredited)
- Production company: Gainsborough Pictures
- Distributed by: General Film Distributors (UK)
- Release date: 26 January 1938 (London)
- Running time: 78 minutes
- Country: United Kingdom
- Language: English

Owd Bob (U.S. title: To the Victor) is a 1938 British drama film directed by Robert Stevenson and starring Will Fyffe and John Loder. It was written by J.B. Williams and Michael Hogan based on the 1898 novel Owd Bob: The Grey Dog of Kenmuir by Alfred Ollivant, previously filmed in 1924.

== Cast ==
- Will Fyffe as Adam McAdam
- John Loder as David Moore
- Margaret Lockwood as Jeannie McAdam
- Graham Moffatt as Tammas
- Moore Marriott as Samuel
- Elliott Mason as Mrs. Winthrop
- Leonard Sharp as bookmakers assistant
- A. Bromley Davenport as Mr Parker, magistrate
- H.F. Maltby as Sergeant Walter Musgrave
- Edmond Breon as Lord Meredale
- Wally Patch as Unlucky Joe, bookmaker
- Alf Goddard as Barry Davis, bookmaker

== Reception ==
Kine Weekly reported the film did well at the British box office in August 1938.

The Monthly Film Bulletin wrote: "This unusual story is well directed by Robert Stevenson. ... Will Fyffe gives a really brilliant performance as the drunken, quarrelsome, crafty old Scot whom one cannot help liking despite his character."

Kine Weekly wrote: "The picture has many claims to distinction, and these are principally represented by Will Fyffe's superb acting in the lead, the spectacular punch and realism of the sheep trial sequences, and the obvious authenticity of the atmosphere. The story is perhaps a little less impressive, fundamentals are a trifle outmoded, but this point of criticism is a comparatively minor one. Taking all in all, the film is an intensely interesting and entertaining slice of English rural life."

The New York Times wrote, "It is an affectionate film, simple as a shepherd's life, and it is an admirable film, gaited to the remarkably adept performance of Will Fyffe as the likable old curmudgeon, McAdam. Mr. Fyffe's McAdam fits snugly into the mental dossier we have been compiling under the heading, "great performances." Such a treacherous old rascal, such an old reprobate, such a wicked-eyed old hypocrite, such a beloved old rip has not been seen hereabouts for many a moon. Such a terribly amusing old boy!...We found it a thoroughly delightful picture, true to its background and true to its author...In short, we enjoyed the picture for the simple and kindly offering it is, and we feel that you will, too—especially if you've a pup about the house."
