= In the Ranks =

- Directed by: Percy Nash
- Written by: Henry Pettitt (play); George R. Sims (play); Brian Daly; John East
- Starring: Gregory Scott; Daisy Cordell; James Lindsay
- Production company: Neptune Film Company
- Distributed by: Jury Films
- Release date: December 1914
- Country: United Kingdom
- Languages: Silent; English intertitles

In the Ranks is a 1914 British silent drama film directed by Percy Nash and starring Gregory Scott, Daisy Cordell and James Lindsay.

== Cast ==
- Gregory Scott as Ned / John Drayton
- Daisy Cordell as Jocelyn Hare
- James Lindsay as Captain Holcroft
- Peggy Hyland as Barbara Herrick
- Douglas Payne as Richard Belton
- Frank Tennant as Captain Wynter
- Joan Ritz as Ruth Herrick
- Edward Sass as Gidgeon Blake
- Jack Denton as Joe Buzzard
- John East as Farmer Herrick
- Douglas Cox as Sergeant Searle
- Ruby Wyndham as Mrs. Buzzard

== Bibliography ==
- Goble, Alan. The Complete Index to Literary Sources in Film. Walter de Gruyter, 1999.
