= Vera Cornish =

British actress (1893–1976)

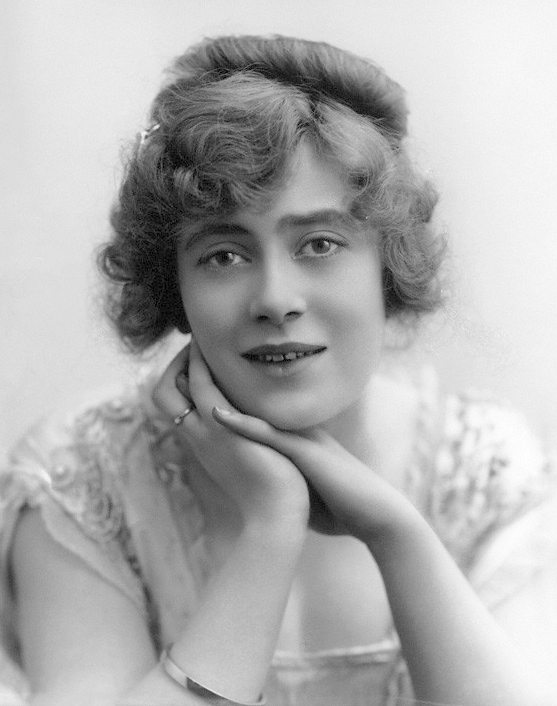
Vera Cornish in 1914.

Vera Cornish (1893 – 1 August 1976) was a British stage and film actress. She was described by the Bioscope as "a beautiful and accomplished actress" and as "one of the leading ladies in Regal Productions".

She married Kenneth Webb in London in 1914.

== Stage Roles ==
- Queen at Seventeen (1914) at Plena's Theatre.
- Who's the Lady? (1914) at the Garrick Theatre, London.
- Quicksands (1918) at the Corporation Theatre, Chesterfield.

== Filmography ==
- A London Flat Mystery (1915)
- The Woman Wins (1915)
- Somewhere in France (1915)
- Abide with Me (1916)
- Broken Barrier (1917)
- The Woman Wins (1918)
- A Guilty Mother (1918)
- Won by a Head (1920)
