= I'm an Explosive =

1933 film

- William Hartnell (centre) in the film
- Directed by: Adrian Brunel
- Written by: Gordon Phillips (novel); Adrian Brunel
- Produced by: George Smith; Harry Cohen
- Starring: William Hartnell; Gladys Jennings; Eliot Makeham; Sybil Grove
- Cinematography: Geoffrey Faithfull
- Production company: George Smith Productions
- Distributed by: Fox
- Release date: March 1933
- Running time: 50 minutes
- Country: United Kingdom
- Language: English

I'm an Explosive is a 1933 British comedy film directed by Adrian Brunel and starring William Hartnell, Gladys Jennings and Eliot Makeham. It was written by Brunel based on the novel by Gordon Phillips.

== Preservation status ==
The British Film Institute National Archive holds a collection of stills but no film or video materials.

== Plot ==
Scientist Harold Whimperley perfects a chemical solution capable of causing anyone who drinks it to explode. He manages to interest the War Office in his deadly discovery, but chaos erupts when his timid brother, Edward, accidentally drinks the formula, mistaking it for whisky. To protect the public, Secret Service agents track Edward and try to herd him into the open countryside so his demise won't endanger the community. Edward misinterprets their actions, believing he is being hunted by his landlady's brothers, who are out for revenge after he rejected her romantic advances. Following a wild chase that leads to Paris, the panic ends when it is discovered that Edward never actually drank the exploding solution after all.

== Cast ==
- William Hartnell as Edward Whimperley
- Gladys Jennings as Anne Pannell
- Eliot Makeham as Professor Whimperly
- D. A. Clarke-Smith as Lord Ferndale
- Sybil Grove as Miss Harriman
- Harry Terry as Mould
- George Dillon as Shilling
- Adele Blanche as French girl

== Production ==
The film was a quota quickie made at Nettlefold Studios in Walton-on-Thames by producer George Smith and distributed by Fox.

== Reception ==
The film proved a considerable hit with audiences on its general release.

Film Weekly wrote: "A ridiculous story of a man who is supposed to become a 'human explosive' made into an equally ridiculous film. The treatment is amateurish and the acting mediocre."

The Daily Film Renter wrote: "Poor comedy effort. ... Dialogue is flat, action drags, and film lacks inspiration. Only for the smallest halls and very uncritical. It is difficult to imagine that anybody could have made much of a comedy out of the material at hand, though, as Adrian Brunel adapted Gordon Phillips' novel and apparently provided the dialogue, there are evidently two opinions on this point."

Kine Weekly wrote: "A laughable, ingenious absurdity, enacted by a clever cast, and directed by a producer who displays a bright, lively sense of the ridiculous. The film provides forty-five minutes of good fun and represents capital supporting entertainment."
