= Old Bill Through the Ages =

1924 British silent comedy fantasy film

- Directed by: Thomas Bentley
- Written by: Bruce Bairnsfather (cartoons)
- Starring: Syd Walker; Arthur Cleave; Jack Denton; Gladys Ffolliott
- Production company: Ideal Film Company
- Distributed by: Ideal Film Company
- Release date: 1924
- Country: United Kingdom
- Language: English

Old Bill Through the Ages is a 1924 British silent comedy fantasy film directed by Thomas Bentley and starring Syd Walker, Arthur Cleave and Jack Denton. The film was based on a series of cartoons by Bruce Bairnsfather. The screenplay concerns a soldier serving in the trenches during the First World War who falls asleep and travels through time, encountering a number of historical figures.

== Cast ==
- Syd Walker - Old Bill
- Arthur Cleave - Bert
- Jack Denton - Alf
- Gladys Ffolliott - Queen Elizabeth I
- Austin Leigh - William Shakespeare
- Franzi Carlos - Ann Hathaway
- William Pardue - The Redskin
- Bruce Bairnsfather - Himself
- Wallace Bosco
- Douglas Payne
- Cecil Morton York
- Clive Currie
- Cyril Dane
