= Won by a Head =

1920 film

- Directed by: Percy Nash
- Starring: Rex Davis; Frank Tennant; Vera Cornish
- Release date: 1920
- Country: United Kingdom
- Language: English

Won by a Head is a 1920 British silent sports film directed by Percy Nash and starring Rex Davis, Frank Tennant and Vera Cornish. It was set in the horseracing world.

== Cast ==
- Rex Davis as Chester Lawton
- Frank Tennant as Milton Bell
- Vera Cornish as Phyllis Reid
- Wallace Bosco as Jim Kort
- Douglas Payne
- J. Edwards Barker
- Madge Tree

== See also ==
- List of films about horses
- List of films about horse racing
