= The Sting of the Lash =

1921 film by Henry King

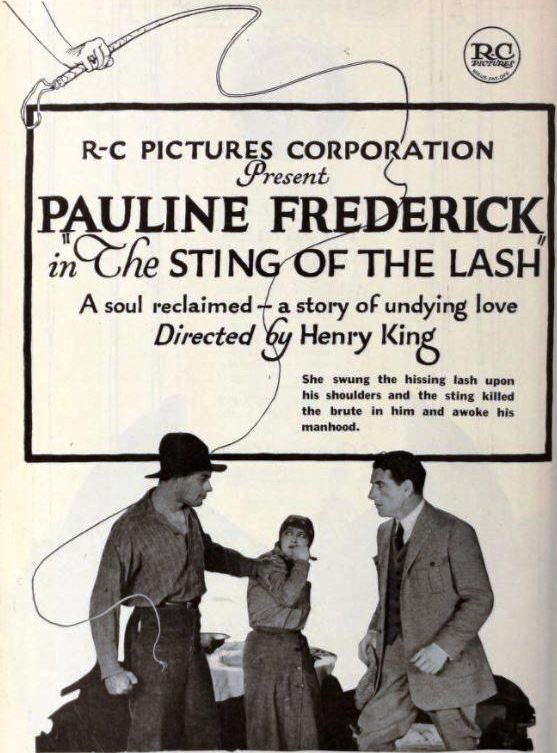
- Advertisement
- Directed by: Henry King
- Written by: Harvey Gates; H. Tipton Steck
- Starring: Pauline Frederick; Clyde Fillmore; Lawson Butt
- Cinematography: Devereaux Jennings
- Distributed by: Robertson-Cole Distributing Corporation
- Release date: September 11, 1921
- Running time: 60 minutes
- Country: United States
- Languages: Silent; English intertitles

The Sting of the Lash is a 1921 American silent drama film directed by Henry King and starring Pauline Frederick, Clyde Fillmore, and Lawson Butt.

== Cast ==
- Pauline Frederick as Dorothy Keith
- Clyde Fillmore as Joel Grant
- Lawson Butt as Rhodes
- Lionel Belmore as Ben Ames
- Jack Richardson as Seeley
- Edwin Stevens as Daniel Keith
- Betty Hall as Crissy (6 years)
- Evelyn McCoy as Crissy (10 years)
- Percy Challenger as Rorke

== Bibliography ==
- Donald W. McCaffrey & Christopher P. Jacobs. Guide to the Silent Years of American Cinema. Greenwood Publishing, 1999. ISBN 0-313-30345-2
