= Gerald Lawrence =

British actor (1873–1957)

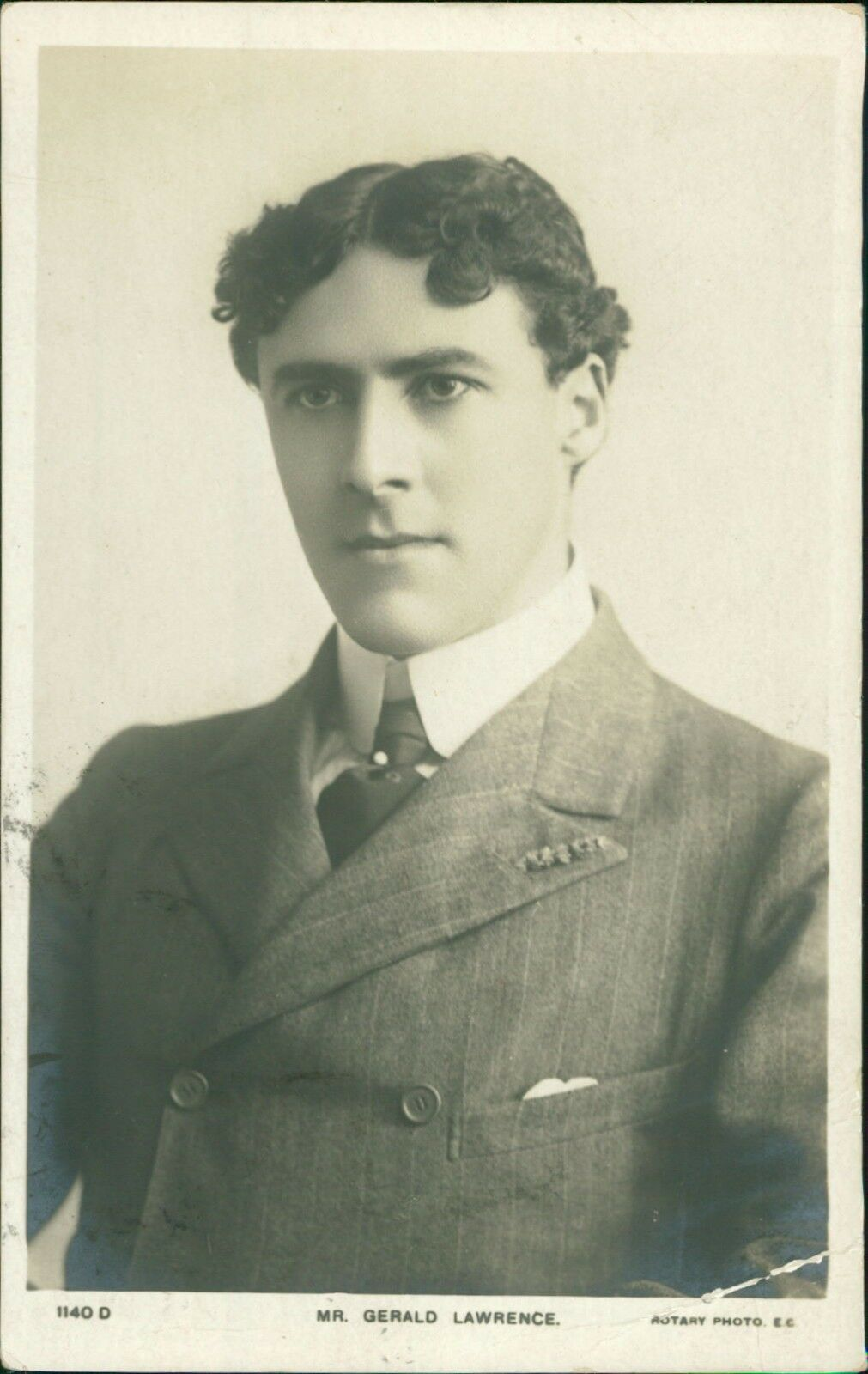
- Lawrence in 1905
- Born: Gerald Leslie Lawrence; 23 March 1873; London, England, U.K.
- Died: 9 May 1957 (aged 84); London, England, U.K.
- Occupations: Actor, manager
- Years active: 1897–1938
- Spouses: Lilian Braithwaite (m. 1897; div. 1905) Fay Davis (m. 1906; died 1945) Madge Comptom (m. 1949)
- Children: Joyce Carey, Marjorie Fay Lawrence

Gerald Leslie Lawrence (23 March 1873 – 9 May 1957) was a British actor and manager.

Lawrence was born in London in 1873, the son of Emily Mills (née Asher; 1832–1912) and John Moss Lawrence (1827–1888), an investor. Lawrence studied stagecraft with Frank Benson before founding his own Shakespearean company with William Haviland (1860–1917) – the Haviland and Lawrence Shakespearian & Dramatic Company – which during 1897 and 1898 toured South Africa where, among others, they performed Hamlet and Much Ado About Nothing. In the cast was Lawrence's wife Lilian Braithwaite, whom he had married shortly before the tour.

== Career ==
On their return to Great Britain in 1900 Lawrence played the Dauphin opposite Lewis Waller as Henry V at the Lyceum Theatre. He appeared at Her Majesty's Theatre in The Merry Wives of Windsor (1901), and played Telemachus in Ulysses (1902), both opposite Herbert Beerbohm Tree and Courtice Pounds in both productions. He was Orlando in As You Like It, again opposite Courtice Pounds and starring Robert Courtneidge at the Prince's Theatre, Manchester. In 1903 he toured in Laurence Irving's play Richard Lovelace in a cast that included Irving and Mabel Hackney.

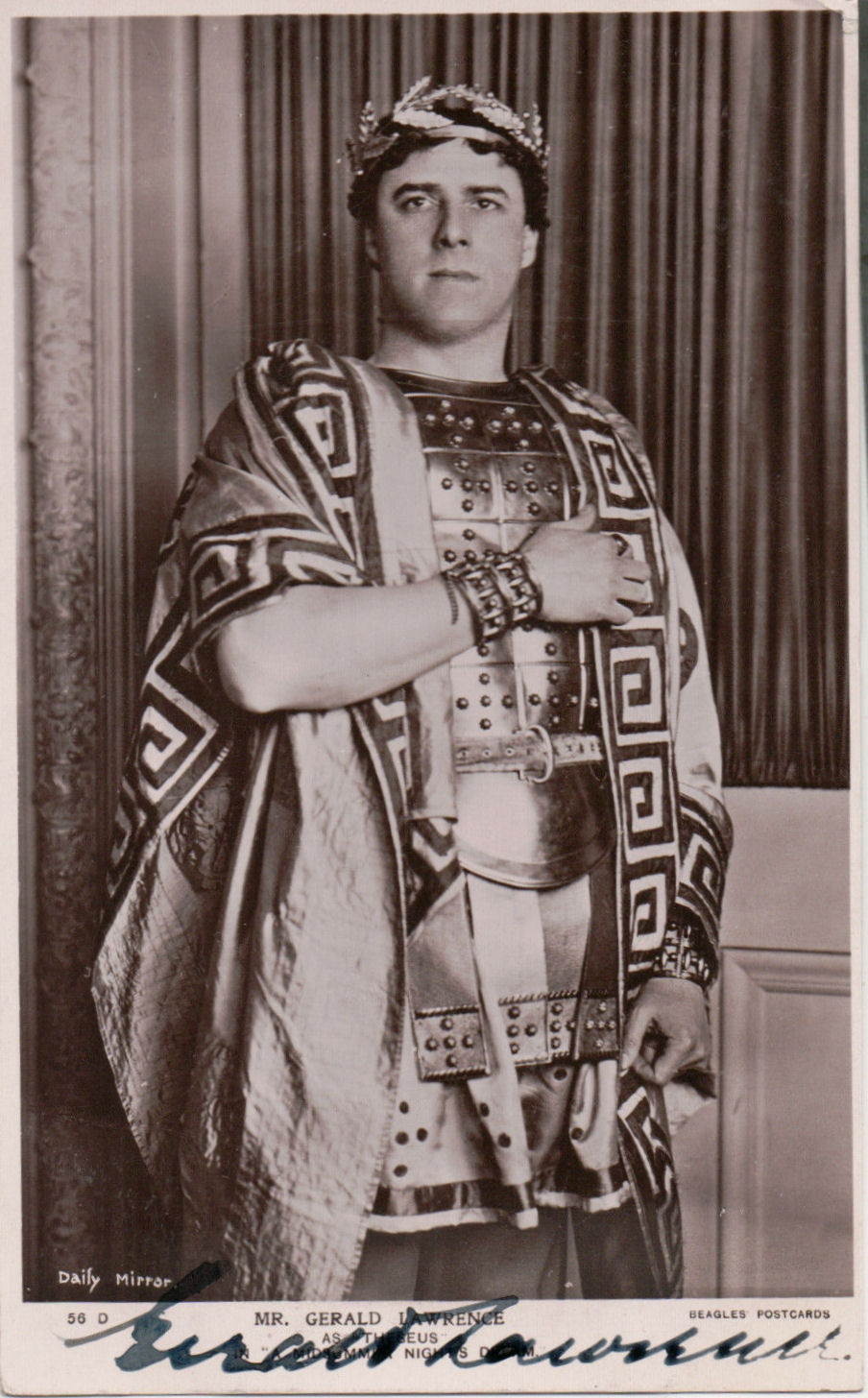
As Theseus in A Midsummer Night's Dream (1911)

He joined Henry Irving at the Lyceum Theatre in juvenile roles and acted in Sardou's Dante (1903) at the Theatre Royal, Drury Lane. He was playing Henry II on the night Irving made his last appearance as Becket in Tennyson's play in 1905. Lawrence then travelled to America, and returning to Great Britain in 1909 he directed a number of Shakespeare's plays at the Royal Court Theatre and Her Majesty's Theatre including Twelfth Night (1909), A Midsummer Night's Dream, Henry VIII and The War God (1911). In 1912, he gave an outstanding performance in the title role in a revival of George Bernard Shaw's Captain Brassbound's Conversion. At the Shakespeare Memorial Theatre he played Bassanio in The Merchant of Venice (1914), Don Pedro in Much Ado About Nothing (1914), Orsino in Twelfth Night; (1914), and Orlando in As You Like It (1914).

After serving in the Royal Naval Volunteer Reserve during World War I he returned to the stage in 1919, playing de Guiche to the Cyrano de Bergerac of Robert Loraine in Rostand's Cyrano de Bergerac. He was Cavaradossi in Victorien Sardou's La Tosca at the Aldwych Theatre (1920); directed and played David Garrick in Louis N. Parker's play Mr Garrick at the Royal Court Theatre (1922); and in 1923 played the title role in a provincial tour of a revival of Booth Tarkington's Monsieur Beaucaire before opening in it in 1924 at the Strand Theatre. In 1927 Lawrence, by now known primarily as a film actor, again undertook a tour of South Africa as actor-manager of a West End theatre company putting on a repertoire of plays that included Monsieur Beaucaire, The School for Scandal, David Garrick, 13, Simon Street and Beau Brummel. In 1930 he played the Duke of Buckingham in Richard III at the New Theatre and later at the Prince of Wales Theatre. He made his last appearance on the stage in 1938 in Drake at the London Coliseum.

== Personal life ==
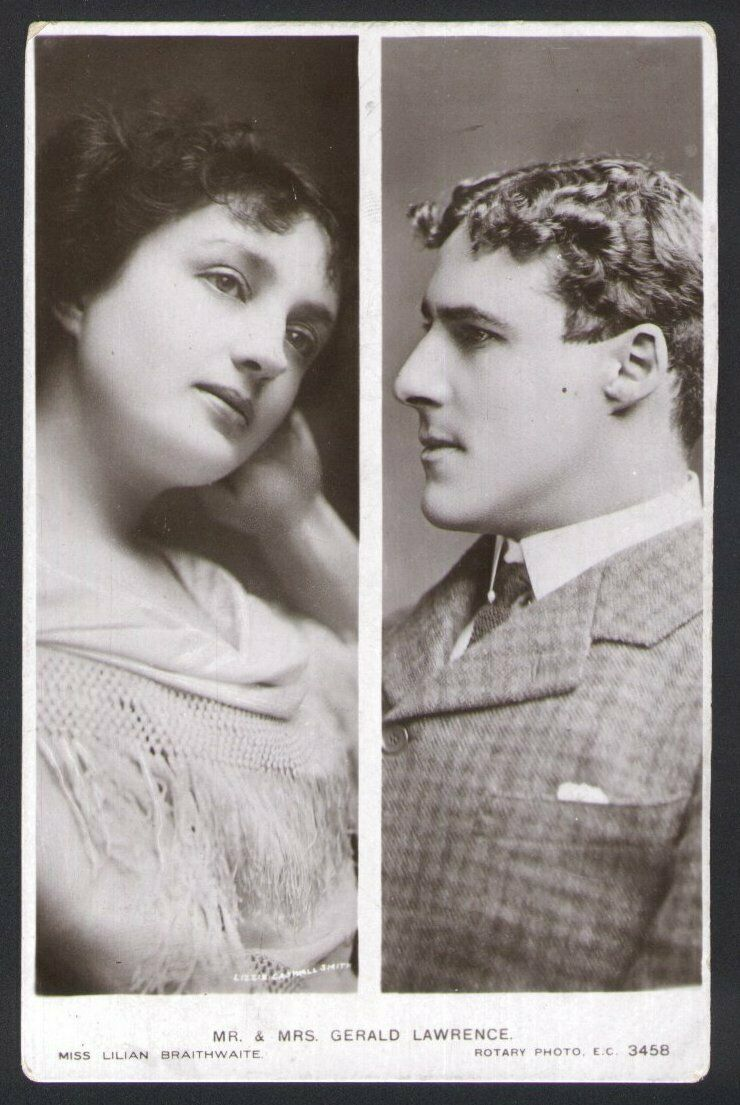
Lilian Braithwaite and Gerald Lawrence

He was married, firstly, to stage and screen actress Dame Lilian Braithwaite in 1897; their child was actress Joyce Carey (born Joyce Lawrence). That union ended in divorce in 1905 following his adultery and desertion. His second and third wives were also actresses. His second marriage in about 1906 was to the American actress Fay Davis, who appeared with him in many of his later productions. This ended with her death in 1945. His third marriage was to Madge Compton in 1949, (born Madge Mussared, 1893–1969); this marriage ended with his own death.

With Davis he had a daughter, Marjorie Fay Lawrence (1908–1930), who was murdered by her husband Eardley Maskall Cotterill in Gerald's home at 11 Ornan Road, Haverstock Hill. Eardley then shot himself.

== Death ==
Lawrence died on 9 May 1957 in London.

== Selected filmography ==
- Henry VIII (1911)
- The Harbour Lights (1914)
- Enoch Arden (1914)
- A Bunch of Violets (1916)
- The Grand Babylon Hotel (1916)
- Carrots (1917)
- The Fall of a Saint (1920)
- The Glorious Adventure (1922)
- The Iron Duke (1934)
