= Frank Tennant =

British actor (1876–1971)

Frank Tennant (10 August 1876 – 13 January 1971) was a British stage and screen actor

Frank Tennant was born Thomas Henry Merriman in Upper Broughton, Nottinghamshire. He died at age 94 in Horsmonden, Kent.

== Selected filmography ==
- The Murdoch Trial (1914)
- In the Ranks (1914)
- The Coal King (1915)
- A Rogue's Wife (1915)
- The Romany Rye (1915)
- The Little Minister (1915)
- Master and Man (1915)
- Flying from Justice (1915)
- Rodney Stone (1920)
- Won by a Head (1920)
