= Enoch Arden (1914 film) =

1914 film by Percy Nash

Enoch Arden is a 1914 British silent drama film directed by Percy Nash and starring Gerald Lawrence, Fay Davis and Ben Webster. It was based on the 1864 poem Enoch Arden by Alfred, Lord Tennyson.

== Cast ==
- Gerald Lawrence - Enoch Arden
- Fay Davis - Annie Lee
- Ben Webster - Philip Ray
- Dame May Whitty - Miriam Lane
- Gregory Scott - Charles
- John Marlborough East - John Lane
- Douglas Payne - The Priest
- Joan Ritz
- Douglas Cox
