= The First Woman =

1922 silent film

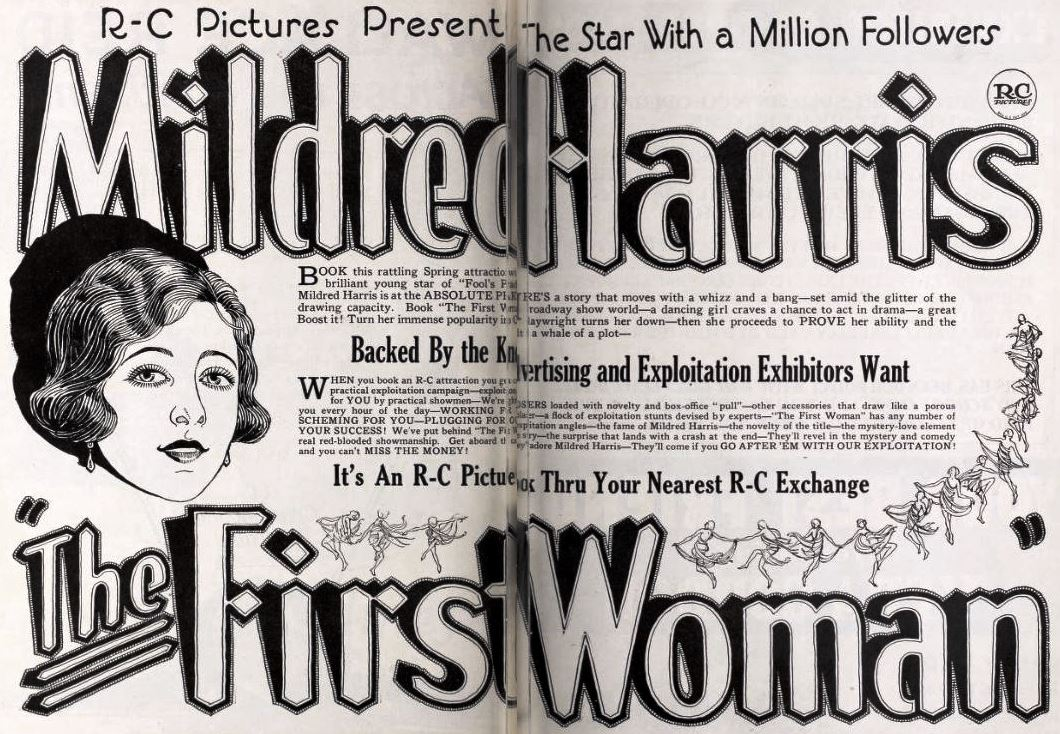
- Directed by: Glen Lyons
- Written by: Glen Lyons
- Starring: Mildred Harris; Percy Marmont; Lloyd Hammond
- Cinematography: Alvin Knechtel
- Production companies: D & M Films
- Distributed by: Robertson-Cole Distributing Corporation
- Release date: April 30, 1922
- Running time: 50 minutes
- Country: United States
- Languages: Silent; English intertitles

The First Woman is a 1922 American silent drama film directed by Glen Lyons and starring Mildred Harris, Percy Marmont and Lloyd Hammond.

== Cast ==
- Mildred Harris as The Girl
- Percy Marmont as Paul Marsh
- Lloyd Hammond as Jack Gordon
- Donald Blakemore as Tom Markham
- Oliver La Baddie as Professor Bazzufi
- Wallace Baker as Eloysius Bangs
- Andrew Hicks as Mr. Sham
- A. West as Judge Stone
- Joseph G. Portell as Jacquis
- Hubert La Baddie as Murat
- Corydon W. Hatt as The Priest
- Walter Orr as James
- Ernest Blasdell as Detective
- Stephen Geitz as Police Sergeant
- Mrs. J. Montgomery as Mrs. Giggleton
- Betty Hall as Marie
- Flora Arline Arle as Elsa

== Bibliography ==
- Munden, Kenneth White. The American Film Institute Catalog of Motion Pictures Produced in the United States, Part 1. University of California Press, 1997.
