= Owd Bob (1998 film) =

1998 British-Canadian drama film

Owd Bob is a 1998 British-Canadian drama film directed by Rodney Gibbons and starring James Cromwell, Colm Meaney and Jemima Rooper. It is based on the 1898 novel Owd Bob by Alfred Ollivant.

== Differences from the book include ==
- That the time has been updated by a century
- That the location is now the Isle of Man instead of Cumbria
- Adam MacAdam is the boy's grandfather, not father

== Main cast ==
- James Cromwell - Adam MacAdam
- Colm Meaney - Keith Moore
- Jemima Rooper - Maggie Moore
- John Benfield - Blake
- Antony Booth - Tammas
- Dermot Keaney - Peter
- Moira Brooker - Heather Moore
- Anna Keaveney - Janet MacPherson
- Dylan Provencher - David Roberts
- Paul Moulton - Constable Jack
- Len Hulme - Doctor Southam
