= Constant Hot Water (film) =

1923 British film by George A. Cooper

- Directed by: George A. Cooper
- Written by: P.L. Mannock
- Starring: Gladys Jennings; John Stuart; Lawford Davidson
- Production company: Quality Plays
- Distributed by: Gaumont British Distributors
- Release date: October 1923
- Country: United Kingdom
- Languages: Silent; English intertitles

Constant Hot Water is a 1923 British silent comedy film directed by George A. Cooper and starring Gladys Jennings, John Stuart and Lawford Davidson.

== Cast ==
- Gladys Jennings as Rosina Tennant
- John Stuart as Cuthbert
- Lawford Davidson as Man
- Nora Roylance as Girl
- Gibb McLaughlin as Eardley Adams
- John Marlborough East as Janitor

== Bibliography ==
- Murphy, Robert. Directors in British and Irish Cinema: A Reference Companion. British Film Institute, 2006.
