= Henry Victor =

English character actor (1892–1945)

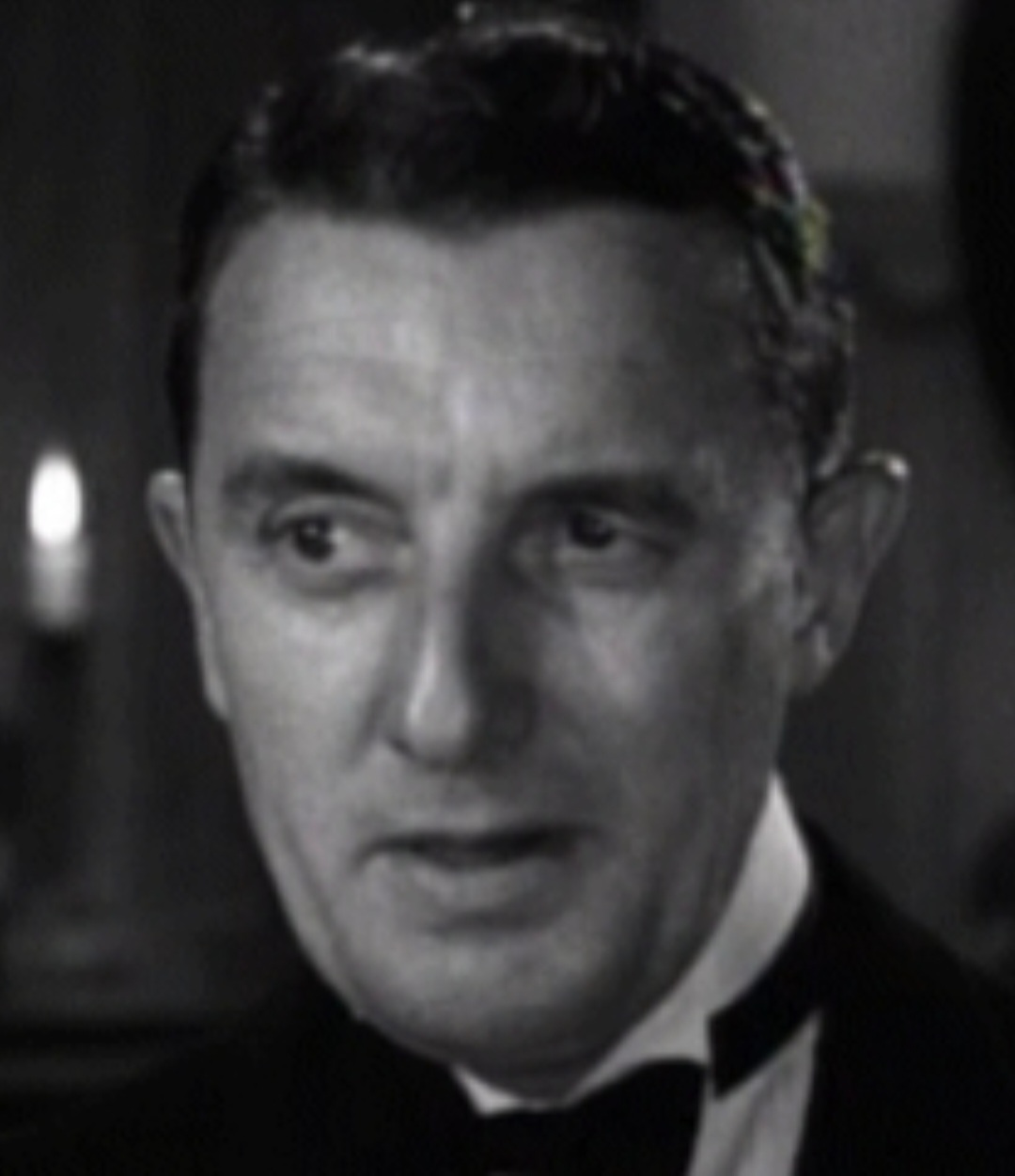
- Henry Victor in King of the Zombies in 1941
- Born: 2 October 1892; London, England
- Died: 15 March 1945 (aged 52); Los Angeles, California, U.S.
- Resting place: Oakwood Memorial Park Cemetery
- Occupation: Actor
- Years active: 1914–1945

Henry Victor (2 October 1892 – 15 March 1945) was an English–American character actor who had his highest profile in the film silent era, he appeared in numerous film roles in his native Britain, before emigrating to the United States in 1939 where he continued his career, working in Hollywood films.

== Biography ==
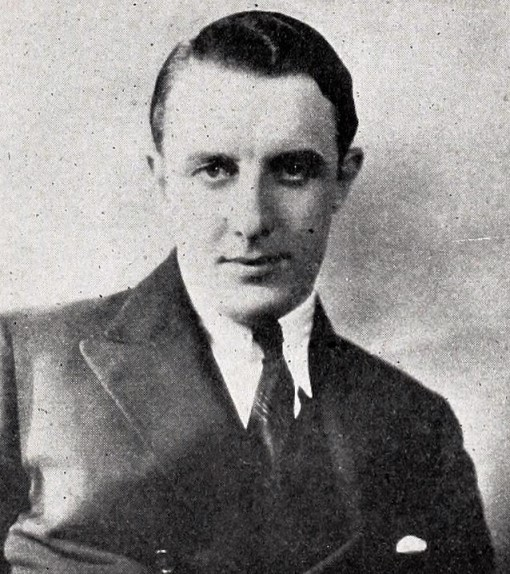
Henry Victor in 1925

Victor was born in London, England, but was raised in Germany, he made his film debut as Prince Andreas in The King's Romance (1914). He appeared in literary interpreted pieces such as The Picture of Dorian Gray (1916) and the Graham Cutts-directed The White Shadow (1923). Victor is probably best remembered for his portrayal of the circus strongman Hercules in Tod Browning's film Freaks (1932). The role was originally considered for Victor McLaglen, with whom Browning had worked previously. Victor emigrated to America in 1939.

Victor later established himself in many roles, in which he often portrayed villains or Nazis in both American and British films with his trademark German accent such as the Ernst Lubitsch film, To Be or Not to Be (1942).

Victor also developed an enigmatic reputation among horror fans for being listed as “The Saxon Warrior” in the opening credits of the 1932 film The Mummy, despite not appearing in the film, as his scenes were edited out for time.

== Death ==
Victor died in 1945, aged 52, from a brain tumor. He is buried in Chatsworth, California, at the Oakwood Memorial Park Cemetery.

== Filmography ==
- The King's Romance (1914) - Prince Andreas
- She (1916) - Leo Vincey
- The Picture of Dorian Gray (1916) - Dorian Gray
- Ora Pro Nobis (1917) - Lord Osborne
- The Secret Woman (1918) - Jesse Redvers
- The Heart of a Rose (1919) - Dick Darrell
- The Call of the Sea (1919)
- A Lass o' the Looms (1919) - Jack Brown
- ¡Cuidado con los ladrones! (1919)
- Calvary (1920) - David Penryn
- As God Made Her (1920) - Seward Pendyne
- John Heriot's Wife (1920) - John Heriot
- Beyond the Dreams of Avarice (1920) - Dr. Lucien Calvert
- Sheer Bluff (1921) - Maurice Hardacre
- The Old Wives' Tale (1921) - Gerald
- Bentley's Conscience (1922) - Fletcer
- A Romance of Old Baghdad (1922) - Horne Jerningham
- Diana of the Crossways (1922) - Hon. Percy Dacier
- A Bill of Divorcement (1922) - Grey Meredith
- The Crimson Circle (1922)
- The Prodigal Son (1923) - Oscar Stephenson
- The Scandal (1923) - Artenezzo
- The Royal Oak (1923) - Charles I / Charles II
- The Colleen Bawn (1924) - Hardress Cregan
- Henry, King of Navarre (1924) - Duc de Guise
- Slaves of Destiny (1924) - Ralph Warriner
- The White Shadow (1924) - Louis Chadwick
- His Grace Gives Notice (1924) - George Berwick
- The Love Story of Aliette Brunton (1924) - Ronald Cavendish
- The Sins Ye Do (1924) - Ronald Hillier
- A Romance of Mayfair (1925) - Jack Dinneford
- The White Monkey (1925) - Wilfrid Desert
- Braveheart (1925) - Sam Harris
- Mulhall's Greatest Catch (1926) - Otto Nelson
- Crossed Signals (1926) - Jack McDermott
- The Beloved Rogue (1927) - Thibault d'Aussigny
- The Fourth Commandment (1927) - Gordon Graham
- Topsy and Eva (1927) - St. Claire
- The Luck of the Navy (1927) - Lt. Clive Stanton
- The Guns of Loos (1928) - John Grimlaw
- Tommy Atkins (1928) - Victor
- L'Argent (1928) - Jacques Hamelin
- After the Verdict (1929) - Mr. Sabine - der fremde Mann
- Down Channel (1929) - Smiler
- Diane (1929) - Oberst Guy de Lasalle
- The Hate Ship (1929) - Count Boris Ivanoff
- Song of Soho (1930) - Henry
- Are You There? (1930) - International crook
- One Heavenly Night (1931) - Almady, the Officer
- Seas Beneath (1931) - Baron Ernst von Steuben (U-boat commander)
- Suicide Fleet (1931) - Captain Von Schlettow
- Freaks (1932) - Hercules
- World and the Flesh (1932) - Revolutionary (uncredited)
- The Mummy (1932) - The Saxon Warrior (scenes deleted)
- Luxury Liner (1933) - Baron von Luden
- The Scotland Yard Mystery (1934) - Floyd
- Tiger Bay (1934) - Olaf
- I Spy (1934) - KPO
- The Way of Youth (1934) - M. Sylvestre
- Murder at Monte Carlo (1935) - Major
- Handle with Care (1935) - Count Paul
- Can You Hear Me, Mother? (1935) - Father
- The Secret Voice (1936) - Brandt
- Fame (1936) - Actor
- Conquest of the Air (1936) - Otto Lilienthal
- The Great Barrier (1937) - Bulldog Kelly
- Our Fighting Navy (1937) - Lt. d'Enriquo
- Holiday's End (1937) - Major Zwanenberg
- Fine Feathers (1937) - Gibbons
- Hotel Imperial (1939) - Sultanov (uncredited)
- Confessions of a Nazi Spy (1939) - Wildebrandt
- Nurse Edith Cavell (1939) - Jaubec (uncredited)
- Thunder Afloat (1939) - German U-boat Officer
- Espionage Agent (1939) - Foreign Official (uncredited)
- We're in the Army Now (1939) - Col. Schlager
- Nick Carter, Master Detective (1939) - J. Lester Hammil
- Zanzibar (1940) - Mate Simpson
- Enemy Agent (1940) - Karl (uncredited)
- The Mortal Storm (1940) - Gestapo Official Confiscating Book on Train (uncredited)
- Mystery Sea Raider (1940) - Cmdr. Bulow
- Spring Parade (1940) - Dutch Officer (uncredited)
- Seven Sinners (1940) - Dutch Police Officer (uncredited)
- Escape (1940) - Gestapo Officer with Hooked Nose (uncredited)
- Charter Pilot (1940) - Faber
- The Mad Doctor (1941) - Furber (uncredited)
- King of the Zombies (1941) - Dr. Miklos Sangre
- Underground (1941) - Gestapo Agent (uncredited)
- Dangerously They Live (1941) - U-boat Captain Horst (uncredited)
- Blue, White and Perfect (1942) - Rudolf Hagerman
- All Through the Night (1942) - Meeting Receptionist (uncredited)
- To Be or Not to Be (1942) - Captain Schultz
- The Wife Takes a Flyer (1942) - Col. Bosch (uncredited)
- Desperate Journey (1942) - Heinrich Schwarzmueller
- Once Upon a Honeymoon (1942) - German Storm Trooper (uncredited)
- Underground Agent (1942) - Johann Schrode
- Sherlock Holmes and the Secret Weapon (1942) - Professor Frederic Hoffner (uncredited)
- They Got Me Covered (1943) - Staeger (uncredited)
- Don Winslow of the Coast Guard (1943) - Heilrich
- Mission to Moscow (1943) - Herr Schufeldt - Hamburg Official (uncredited)
- That Nazty Nuisance (1943) - Kapitan von Popoff
- Above Suspicion (1943) - German Officer (uncredited)
- The Cross of Lorraine (1943) - Minor Role (uncredited)
- Betrayal from the East (1945) - Brunzman (uncredited)
- A Royal Scandal (1945) - Russian General (uncredited) (final film role)
