= Darby and Joan (1920 film) =

1920 British film by Percy Nash

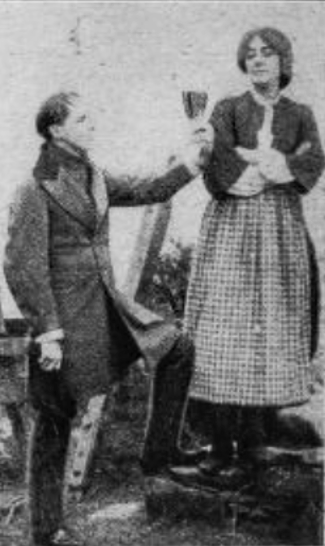
- Derwent Hall Caine, as Patrick Gorry, shows Leal Douglas, as his mother, the cup he won
- Directed by: Percy Nash
- Written by: Hall Caine
- Produced by: Maurice Elvey
- Starring: Derwent Hall Caine; Leal Douglas; Ivy Close; Meggie Albanesi; George Wynne
- Production company: Master Film Company
- Release date: September 1920
- Running time: 10 reels 6000 feet 180 minutes
- Country: United Kingdom
- Languages: Silent; English intertitles

Darby and Joan is a 1920 British drama film directed by Percy Nash and starring Derwent Hall Caine, Leal Douglas, Ivy Close, Meggie Albanesi and George Wynn. The screenplay was written by the novelist Hall Caine and set on the Isle of Man.

== Plot ==
Sir Patrick and Lady Gorry sit by the fireside, and turning the pages of an old album, recall their past life. As a boy Patrick's mother, a widow, kept the mill in a small village in the Isle of Man. Sayle Moore, a large landowner, diverted the mill stream to create an artificial lake in his grounds, robbing the widow of her means of earning a living and bringing poverty to the Gorry's house. Mrs. Gorry and her son Patrick were left nearly destitute and in her heart there grew a great bitterness. She opened a small shop and earned enough for her son's education. One night Mrs. Gorry made her son kneel down and swear vengeance on Sayle Moore. Moore had a daughter of whom he was fond. Patrick Gorry and Sheila Moore fell in love. Their parents would not agree to the marriage, particularly as Patrick has to stand trial on a charge of manslaughter, of which he is acquitted. The young couple married without consent and moved to London where Patrick reads for the bar to which he is called. After a long struggle with poverty he rises in his profession, becoming a judge.

Moore came to see Patrick, and wanted to adopt his little son, but the parents would not consent. Later the little boy was accidentally killed by his grandfather's carriage. The years passed on and Patrick was made a Judge. As a Judge he had to try the case of the man who in his early years had victimised the Gorry family. Patrick has the opportunity of securing the acquittal of the youth to whom his daughter is engaged, who like himself, has to stand in the dock to answer a charge of murder. They are only reconciled to their parents at the end of Sayle Moore's life, but have the satisfaction of assisting Mrs. Gorry in her declining years.

== Cast ==
- Derwent Hall Caine as Patrick Gorry
- Ivy Close as Sheila Moore
- George Wynn as Reginald Stevenson
- Meggie Albanesi as Elin Gorry
- Joan Ritz as Lizzie
- Leal Douglas as Mrs Gorry
- Edward O'Neill as Sayle Moore
- Douglas Munro as Malatesta
- Ernest A. Douglas as Joseph Montague
- Edward Craig as David Montagne
- Mary Taviner as Sheila
