= Carrots (film) =

- Directed by: Frank Wilson
- Written by: Percy Gordon Holmes
- Starring: Chrissie White; Lionelle Howard; Gerald Lawrence
- Production company: Hepworth Pictures
- Distributed by: Pioneer Film Distributors
- Release date: March 1917
- Country: United Kingdom
- Languages: Silent; English intertitles

Carrots is a 1917 British silent crime film directed by Frank Wilson and starring Chrissie White, Lionelle Howard and Gerald Lawrence.

A young female costermonger known as "Carrots" helps her policeman boyfriend thwart a criminal gang led by her own brother.

== Selected filmography ==
- Chrissie White as Carrots
- Lionelle Howard as Mike
- Gerald Lawrence as PC Park
- W.G. Saunders as Old Un'
- Johnny Butt
- Gordon Begg as Nobby
- Harry Gilbey

== Bibliography ==
- Palmer, Scott. British Film Actors' Credits, 1895-1987. McFarland, 1988.
