= Flying from Justice =

1915 film

- Directed by: Percy Nash
- Written by: Mark Melford (play)
- Starring: Gregory Scott; Douglas Payne; Joan Ritz
- Production company: Neptune Film Company
- Distributed by: Neptune Film Company
- Release date: June 1915
- Country: United Kingdom
- Languages: Silent; English intertitles

Flying from Justice is a 1915 British silent crime film directed by Percy Nash and starring Gregory Scott, Douglas Payne and Joan Ritz.

== Cast ==
- Gregory Scott as Charles Baring
- Joan Ritz as Winnie
- Douglas Payne as John Gully
- Alice Moseley as Mildred Parkes
- Fred Morgan as James Woodruffe
- Cecil Morton York as Rev. Lacarsey
- Frank Tennant as John Lacarsey
- Jack Denton as Pearly Tanner
- Maud Williams as Mrs. Baring
- Brian Daly as Maj. Parkes

== Bibliography ==
- Palmer, Scott. British Film Actors' Credits, 1895-1987. McFarland, 1988.
