= Gladys Jennings =

English actress (1903–1994)

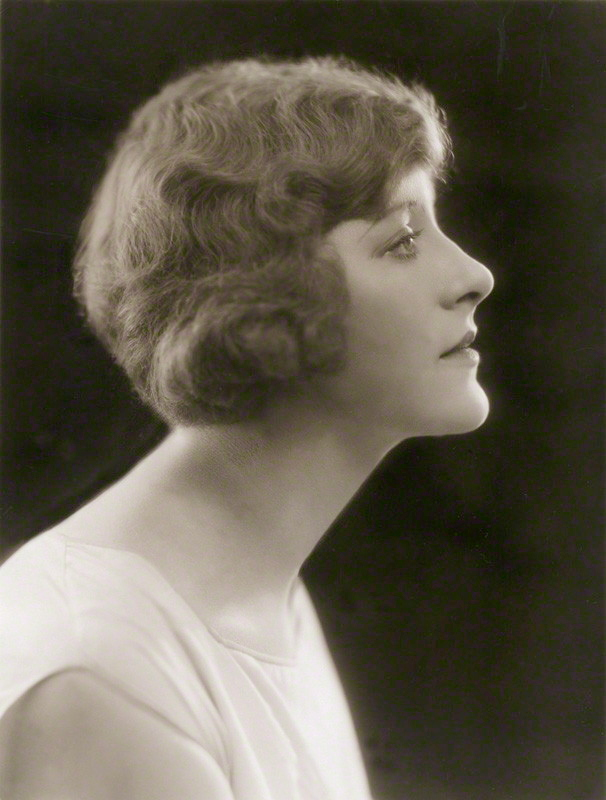
- Gladys Jennings in 1924
- Born: 5 August 1903; Oxford, Oxfordshire; United Kingdom
- Died: October 1994 (aged 91); England, United Kingdom
- Occupation: Actress
- Years active: 1919 – 1935 (film)

Gladys Jennings (5 August 1903 – October 1994) was an English actress.

== Selected filmography ==
- The Lady Clare (1919)
- The Face at the Window (1920)
- The Shuttle of Life (1920)
- The Prey of the Dragon (1921)
- Gwyneth of the Welsh Hills (1921)
- Rob Roy (1922)
- Man and His Kingdom (1922)
- Lamp in the Desert (1923)
- Constant Hot Water (1923)
- Little Miss Nobody (1923)
- Young Lochinvar (1923)
- Henry, King of Navarre (1924)
- The Prude's Fall (1925)
- The Happy Ending (1925)
- The Lady Godiva (1928)
- I'm an Explosive (1933)
- Lilies of the Field (1934)
- Alibi Inn (1935)
