= The Croxley Master =

1921 British film by Percy Nash

- Directed by: Percy Nash
- Based on: Short story by Arthur Conan Doyle
- Starring: Dick Webb; Dora Lennox; Jack Stanley; Joan Ritz
- Release date: 1921
- Country: United Kingdom
- Language: Silent

The Croxley Master is a 1921 British silent drama film directed by Percy Nash. It was based on a short story by Arthur Conan Doyle. A young Welsh medical student enters the boxing ring to fight for a £200 prize which will enable him to establish his own practice.

== Cast ==
- Dick Webb as Robert Montgomery
- Dora Lennox as Dorothy Oldacre
- Jack Stanley as Silas Craggs
- Joan Ritz as Anastasia Craggs
- Cecil Morton York as Doctor Oldacre
- Louis Rihll as Mr.
- Mabel Penn as Mrs. Oldacre
- J.T. MacMillan as Mr. Purvis
- George Turner as Mr. Fawcett
- Ernest Wallace as Mr. Wilson
