= A Lass o' the Looms =

- Directed by: Jack Denton
- Written by: Langford Reed
- Produced by: H. Grenville-Taylor
- Starring: Stella Muir; Henry Victor; Douglas Payne
- Production company: Grenville-Taylor
- Distributed by: Union Photoplays
- Release date: November 1919
- Country: United Kingdom
- Languages: Silent; English intertitles

A Lass o' the Looms is a 1919 British silent drama film directed by Jack Denton and starring Stella Muir, Henry Victor and Douglas Payne.

== Cast ==
- Stella Muir as Nellie Hesketh
- Henry Victor as Jack Brown
- Douglas Payne as Foreman
- Betty Hall as Girl

== Bibliography ==
- Palmer, Scott. British Film Actors' Credits, 1895-1987. McFarland, 1998.
