= Syd Walker =

British actor and comedian (1886–1945)

- Born: Sydney Kirkman; 22 March 1886; Salford, Lancashire, England
- Died: 13 January 1945 (aged 58); Hove, Sussex, England
- Occupations: Comedian, actor
- Spouse: Lily (Lydia) Louie Margaret Kirkman
- Children: Pete Walker

Syd Walker (born Sydney Kirkman; 22 March 1886 – 13 January 1945) was a British actor and comedian.

Born in Salford, Lancashire, he started his career in music halls, both as a solo performer and in double acts. He was also a member of Fred Karno's comedy troupe. After some years performing with Karno, and after losing his Lancashire accent, he became a regular on BBC radio's Band Waggon (1938–1939) as Mr. Walker, a philosophical rag-and-bone man with the popular catch phrase: "What would you do, chums?" He later had his own show, Mr Walker Wants to Know.

He fell ill with appendicitis while playing in pantomime in Croydon, and died in Hove, Sussex, in 1945 at the age of 58.

His son is the film director Pete Walker.

== Filmography ==
- Old Bill Through the Ages (1924)
- Royal Cavalcade (1935)
- Let's Make a Night of It (1937)
- Over She Goes (1938)
- Hold My Hand (1938)
- Sweet Devil (1938)
- Oh Boy! (1938)
- What Would You Do, Chums? (1939)
- I Killed the Count (1939)
- The Gang's All Here (1939)
