= Hugh Croise =

British actor, film director, and screenwriter

Hugh Croise was a British actor, film director, and screenwriter.

He co-wrote the 1920 film By Berwin Banks. He portrayed Charles Devenish in the 1916 film Sally Bishop.

In 1922, he was part of a discussion on good filmmaking and his comments were reported in a newspaper. He noted the big budgets used in American filmmaking.

In 1924 he made a series of films for the Old Man in the Corner series adapted from short stories by Baroness Orczy. He made three featurettes with songs.

== Filmography ==
=== Actor ===
- A London Flat Mystery (1915) as Inspector
- Driven (1916 film) as Mr. Crichton
- A London Flat Mystery (1916) as Bert Johnson
- Sally Bishop (1916 film) (1916) as Charles Devenish
- The Game of Liberty (1916), Under Suspicion for U.S. release, as Bert Johnson

=== Director ===
- Always Tell Your Wife (1923), filming was completed by Alfred Hitchcock
- The Old Man in the Corner (1924), a 12 two-reel series
- The Happy Prisoner (1924)
- Ragan in Ruins (1925)
- The Ball of Fortune (1926)
- Legend of Tichborne Dole (1926)
- The Raw Recruit (1928)
- Nap (1928), adapted from a 1914 play by Ernest Lotinga
- The Barrister (1928)
- Victoria Girls Skipping (1928), "Victoria Theatre Dancers"
- Scrooge (1928)
- Doing His Duty (1930)
- The Burglar and the Girl (1931)

=== Producer and screenwriter ===
- Three Men in a Boat adapted from a Jerome K. Jerome story
- Four Men in a Van

== See also ==
- List of Stoll Pictures films (1924)
