= John Marlborough East =

British actor (1860–1924)

- Born: 1860; London, England
- Died: 18 August 1924 (aged 63–64); London, England
- Occupation: Actor

John Marlborough East (1860–1924) was a British stage and film actor. He was an early film star who received over 3,000 votes in Picturegoer magazine's 1916 contest to establish the "Greatest British Film Player". He was a founder of the Neptune Studios in Borehamwood, which is today the site of Elstree Studios. However, his career rapidly declined. He made his final picture Owd Bob in 1924, and died the same year.

== Selected filmography ==
- Little Lord Fauntleroy (1914)
- The Harbour Lights (1914)
- In the Ranks (1914)
- Enoch Arden (1914)
- The Little Minister (1915)
- The Coal King (1915)
- The Manxman (1917)
- The Woman of His Dream (1921)
- Kipps (1921)
- The Bargain (1921)
- The Glorious Adventure (1922)
- Constant Hot Water (1923)
- Owd Bob (1924)

== Bibliography ==
- Sweet, Matthew. Shepperton Babylon: The Lost Worlds of British Cinema. Faber and Faber, 2005.
