= Always Tell Your Wife =

1923 British short film by Alfred Hitchcock and Seymour Hicks

- Directed by: Hugh Croise; Alfred Hitchcock (uncredited); Seymour Hicks (uncredited)
- Written by: Hugh Croise; Seymour Hicks
- Produced by: Seymour Hicks
- Starring: Seymour Hicks; Gertrude McCoy
- Distributed by: Seymour Hicks Productions
- Release date: February 1923
- Running time: 20 minutes
- Country: United Kingdom
- Language: Silent with English intertitles

Always Tell Your Wife is a 1923 British short comedy film directed by Alfred Hitchcock and Seymour Hicks, after they took over from an ill Hugh Croise. Only one of the two reels is known to survive. It was a remake of the 1914 film directed by Leedham Bantock.

== Cast ==
- Seymour Hicks as The Husband - Jim Chesson
- Ellaline Terriss as The Wife - Mrs. Chesson
- Stanley Logan as Jerry Hawkes
- Gertrude McCoy as Mrs. Hawkes
- Ian Wilson as Office Boy

== See also ==
- Alfred Hitchcock filmography
- List of partially lost films
