= The Elder Miss Blossom =

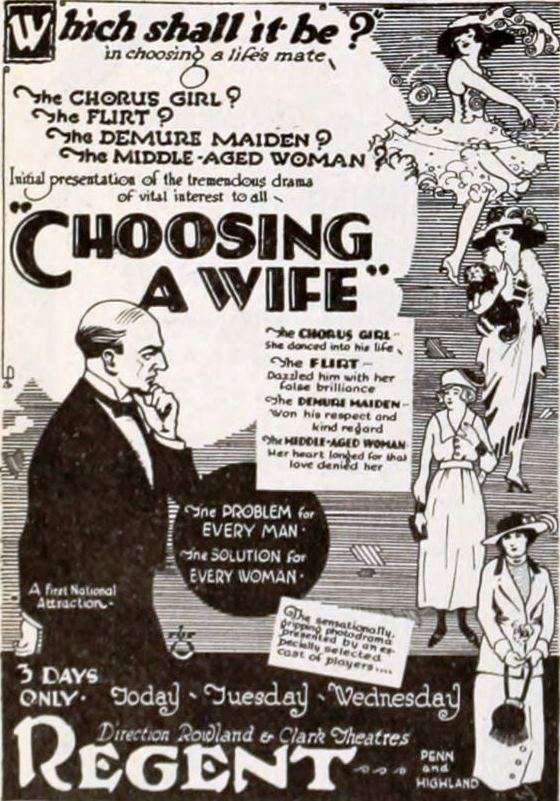
- Advertisement for the British drama film The Elder Miss Blossom under its alternate American title Choosing a Wife, for the Regent Theater in Pittsburgh, Pennsylvania, August 1919
- Directed by: Percy Nash
- Written by: Ernest Hendrie (novel); Metcalfe Woode (novel)
- Produced by: G. B. Samuelson
- Starring: Isobel Elsom; Minna Grey; Owen Nares
- Production company: G.B. Samuelson Productions
- Distributed by: Sun Films
- Release date: September 1918
- Running time: 50 minutes
- Country: United Kingdom
- Languages: Silent; English intertitles

The Elder Miss Blossom (also released under the titles Wanted a Wife and Choosing a Wife) is a 1918 British silent drama film directed by Percy Nash and starring Isobel Elsom, Minna Grey and Owen Nares. It was shot at Isleworth Studios.

== Cast ==
- Isobel Elsom as Sophie Blossom
- Minna Grey as The elder Miss Blossom
- Owen Nares as Curate
- C. M. Hallard as Andrew Quick
- Tom Reynolds

== Bibliography ==
- Harris, Ed. Britain's Forgotten Film Factory: The Story of Isleworth Studios. Amberley Publishing, 2012.
