= Henry, King of Navarre =

1924 film

- Directed by: Maurice Elvey
- Starring: Matheson Lang; Gladys Jennings; Henry Victor
- Release date: 1924
- Country: United Kingdom

Henry, King of Navarre is a 1924 British silent historical film directed by Maurice Elvey and starring Matheson Lang, Gladys Jennings and Henry Victor. It was based on a novel by Alexandre Dumas.

== Cast ==
- Matheson Lang as Henry
- Gladys Jennings as Marguerite de Valois
- Henry Victor as Duc de Guise
- Stella St. Audrie as Catherine de' Medici
- Humberston Wright a Charles XI
- Harry Agar Lyons as Pierre
- Madame d'Esterre as Jeanne d'Albert
