= Black-Eyed Susan (film) =

1913 British film by Percy Nash

Black-Eyed Susan was a 1913 British silent comedy drama film directed by Percy Nash. It was an adaptation of the 1829 play Black-Eyed Susan by Douglas Jerrold.
