= Potter's Clay =

1922 film

- Directed by: H. Grenville-Taylor; Douglas Payne
- Written by: Langford Reed; Hetty Spiers
- Starring: Ellen Terry; Dick Webb; Peggy Hathaway
- Production company: Big Four Famous
- Distributed by: Anchor
- Release date: March 1922
- Country: United Kingdom
- Languages: Silent; English intertitles

Potter's Clay is a 1922 British silent drama film directed by H. Grenville-Taylor and Douglas Payne and starring Ellen Terry, Dick Webb, and Peggy Hathaway.

== Cast ==
- Ellen Terry as Lady Merrall
- Dick Webb as Clifford Merrall
- Peggy Hathaway as Hypatia Dalroy
- Douglas Payne as Henry J. Smith
- Wallace Bosco as Louis
- Gertrude Sterroll as Felicity
- Henry Doughty as Mr. Dalroy

== Bibliography ==
- Low, Rachael. History of the British Film, 1918-1929. George Allen & Unwin, 1971.
