= The Little Minister (1922 film) =

1922 film by David Smith

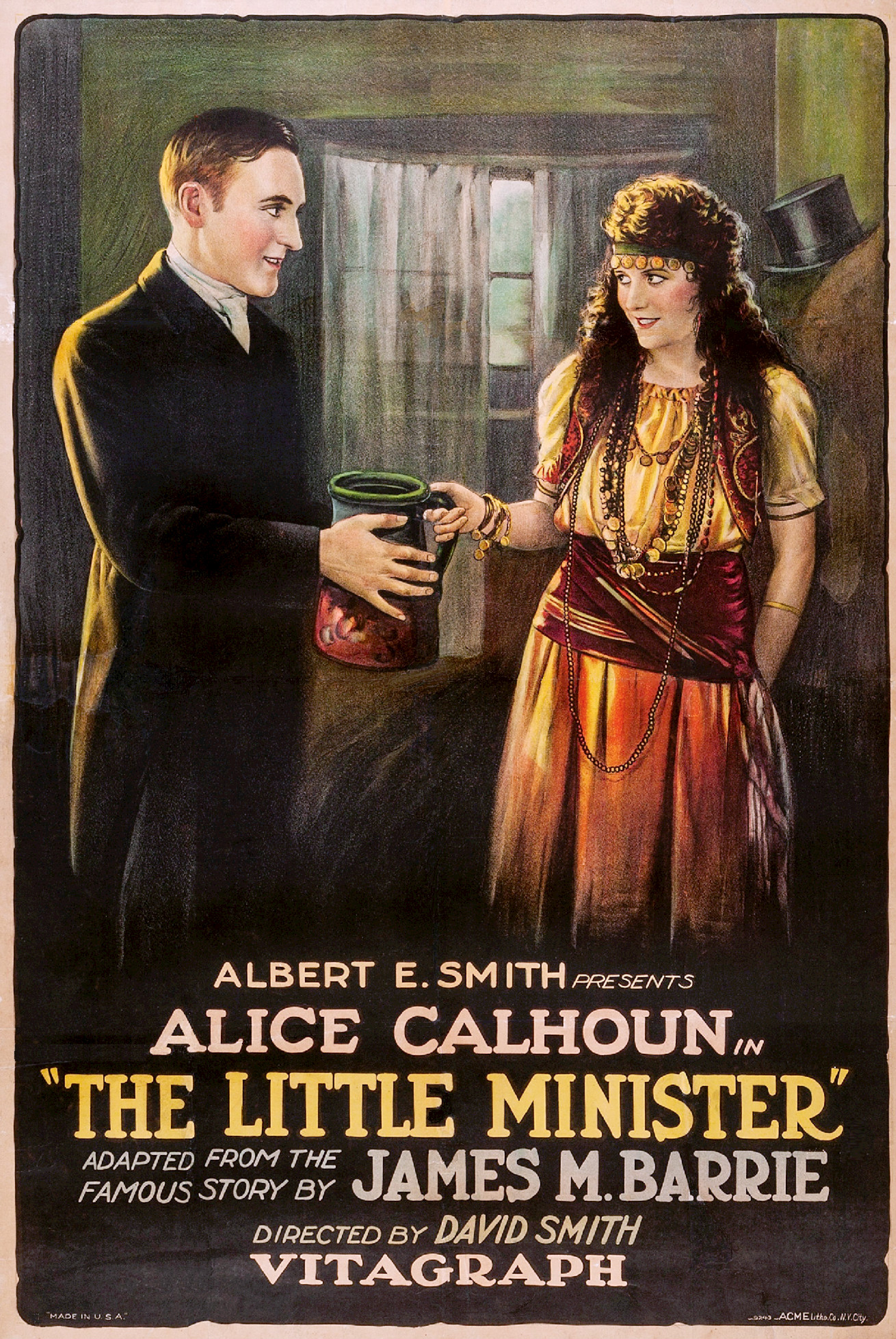
- Film poster
- Directed by: David Smith
- Written by: C. Graham Baker (scenario); Harry Dittmar (scenario)
- Based on: The Little Minister; 1891 novel and play by J. M. Barrie
- Produced by: Vitagraph Company of America; Albert E. Smith
- Starring: Alice Calhoun; James Morrison
- Cinematography: Stephen Smith Jr.
- Distributed by: Vitagraph Company of America
- Release date: January 22, 1922
- Running time: 6 reels
- Country: United States
- Language: Silent (English intertitles)

The Little Minister is a lost 1922 American silent drama film directed by David Smith and produced and distributed by Vitagraph Company of America. It is based on an 1891 novel and 1897 play by J. M. Barrie, The Little Minister. The film was released almost in direct competition with a late 1921 version from Paramount, The Little Minister starring Betty Compson. This version stars Vitagraph favorites Alice Calhoun and James Morrison.

== Cast ==
- Alice Calhoun as Lady Babbie
- James Morrison as Gavin Dishart
- Henry Herbert as Lord Rintoul
- Alberta Lee as Margaret Dishart
- William McCall as Rob Dow
- Dorothea Wolbert as Nanny Webster
- Maud Emery as Jean (credited as Maud Emery)
- George Stanley as Doctor McQueen
- Mickey Daniels as Micah Dow (credited as Richard Daniels)
- Charles Wheelock as Captain Halliwell
