= A Bunch of Violets (film) =

1916 British film by Frank Wilson

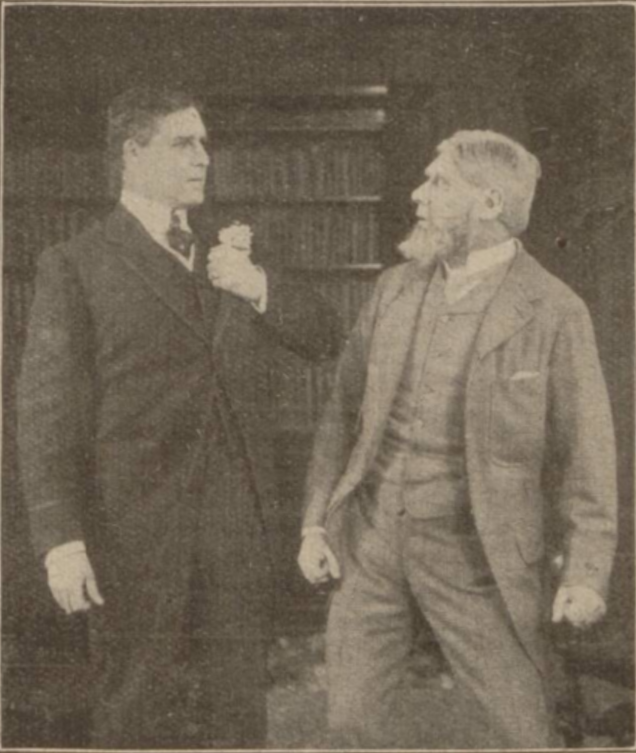
- Tom Mowbray and Gerald Lawrence
- Directed by: Frank Wilson
- Written by: Sydney Grundy (play); Victor Montefiore
- Starring: Chrissie White; Gerald Lawrence; Violet Hopson
- Production company: Hepworth Pictures
- Distributed by: Ward Films
- Release date: April 1916
- Country: United Kingdom
- Languages: Silent; English intertitles

A Bunch of Violets is a 1916 British silent drama film directed by Frank Wilson and starring Chrissie White, Gerald Lawrence and Violet Hopson. It is an adaptation of Sydney Grundy's 1894 play A Bunch of Violets.

== Cast ==
- Chrissie White as Violet Marchant
- Gerald Lawrence as Sir Philip Marchant
- Violet Hopson as Mrs. Murgatroyd
- Lionelle Howard as Harold Inglis
- Margaret Halstan as Lady Marchant
- Tom Mowbray as Mark Murgatroyd
- Charles Vane as Harker

== Bibliography ==
- Gifford, Denis. The Illustrated Who's Who in British Films. B.T. Batsford, 1978.
