= The Call of the Sea (1919 film) =

1919 British film by H. Grenville-Taylor

- Written by: H. Grenville-Taylor
- Starring: Henry Victor; Booth Conway; Stella Muir
- Production company: Grenville-Taylor
- Distributed by: Union Photoplays
- Release date: July 1919
- Country: United Kingdom
- Languages: Silent; English intertitles

The Call of the Sea is a 1919 British silent drama film directed by H. Grenville-Taylor and starring Henry Victor, Booth Conway and Stella Muir.

== Bibliography ==
- Palmer, Scott. British Film Actors' Credits, 1895-1987. McFarland, 1998.
