= Stella Muir =

English silent film actress

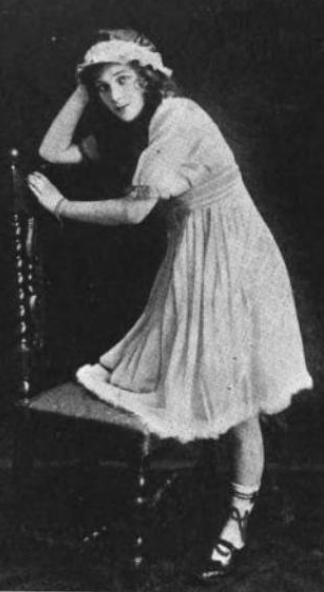
- Stella Muir, from a 1919 advertisement
- Born: 12 September 1900; Scarborough, North Riding of Yorkshire, England
- Died: 3 June 1984 (aged 83); Marlow, Buckinghamshire, England
- Occupation: Actress

Stella Muir (12 September 1900 – 3 June 1984), known as the English Mary Pickford was an early twentieth-century English film actress.

== Life ==
Born Edith Alice May Muir on 12 September 1900, in Scarborough, Yorkshire, she worked as factory girl in a clothing manufacturers in the York Street area of Leeds. Muir had a short film career working in silent movies, initially in crowd work. She was credited in three films in 1919, a series of twelve shorts in 1920 and three more short films in 1922.

Muir died on 3 June 1984 in Marlow, Buckinghamshire.

== Filmography ==
- The Heart of a Rose (1920) as Rose Fairlie
- A Lass o' the Looms (1919)
- The Call of the Sea (1919)
- Film Pie No.s 1-12 (1920)
- The Old Actor’s Story (1922) as Nell
- The Magic Wand(1922)
- The Lights O' London (1922)
