= Sally Bishop (1916 film) =

1916 film by George Pearson

Sally Bishop is a 1916 British silent romance film directed by George Pearson and starring Marjorie Villis, Aurelio Sidney and Peggy Hyland. It is an adaptation of the 1910 novel Sally Bishop, a Romance by E. Temple Thurston.

== Cast ==
- Marjorie Villis - Sally Bishop
- Aurelio Sidney - John Traill
- Peggy Hyland - Janet Hallard
- Alice De Winton - Mrs Durlacher
- Jack Leigh - Arthur
- Christine Rayner - Miss Standish Rowe
- Hugh Croise - Charles Devenish
- Fred Rains - Reverend Bishop
