= The Heart of a Rose =

- Directed by: Jack Denton
- Written by: Langford Reed
- Produced by: H. Grenville-Taylor
- Starring: Stella Muir; Henry Victor; Douglas Payne
- Production company: Grenville-Taylor
- Distributed by: Union Photoplays
- Release date: July 1919
- Country: United Kingdom
- Languages: Silent; English intertitles

The Heart of a Rose is a 1919 British silent drama film directed by Jack Denton and starring Stella Muir, Henry Victor and Douglas Payne. The film has a northern setting and was filmed in Sheffield. Described as ‘a simple story of the novelette type,’ it apparently has some ‘interesting scenes of the interior of an iron foundry.’ The reviewer – credited only as Lantern Man by The Yorkshire Evening Post – is not that enthusiastic: ‘Although containing nothing new, it is thoroughly clean and wholesome, and possesses that “heart” interest so dear to most cinemagoers.’ This ‘heart interest’ is based upon Muir's journey from the slums of Sheffield – ‘wherein the “motherly” child “minds” the unwashed ragged urchins, who are not poor because “the poor are only those who feel poor”‘ – to a new life as the ‘young lady of a mansion.’ In the view of Lantern Man, it ‘has an appeal that makes for popularity.’

== Cast ==
- Stella Muir as Rose Fairlie
- Henry Victor as Dick Darrell
- Douglas Payne as Stephen Carnforth
- Edward Thilby as Father Gregory
- Joan Langford Reed as Baby

== Bibliography ==
- Palmer, Scott. British Film Actors' Credits, 1895-1987. McFarland, 1998.
