= Owd Bob =

1898 book by Alfred Ollivant

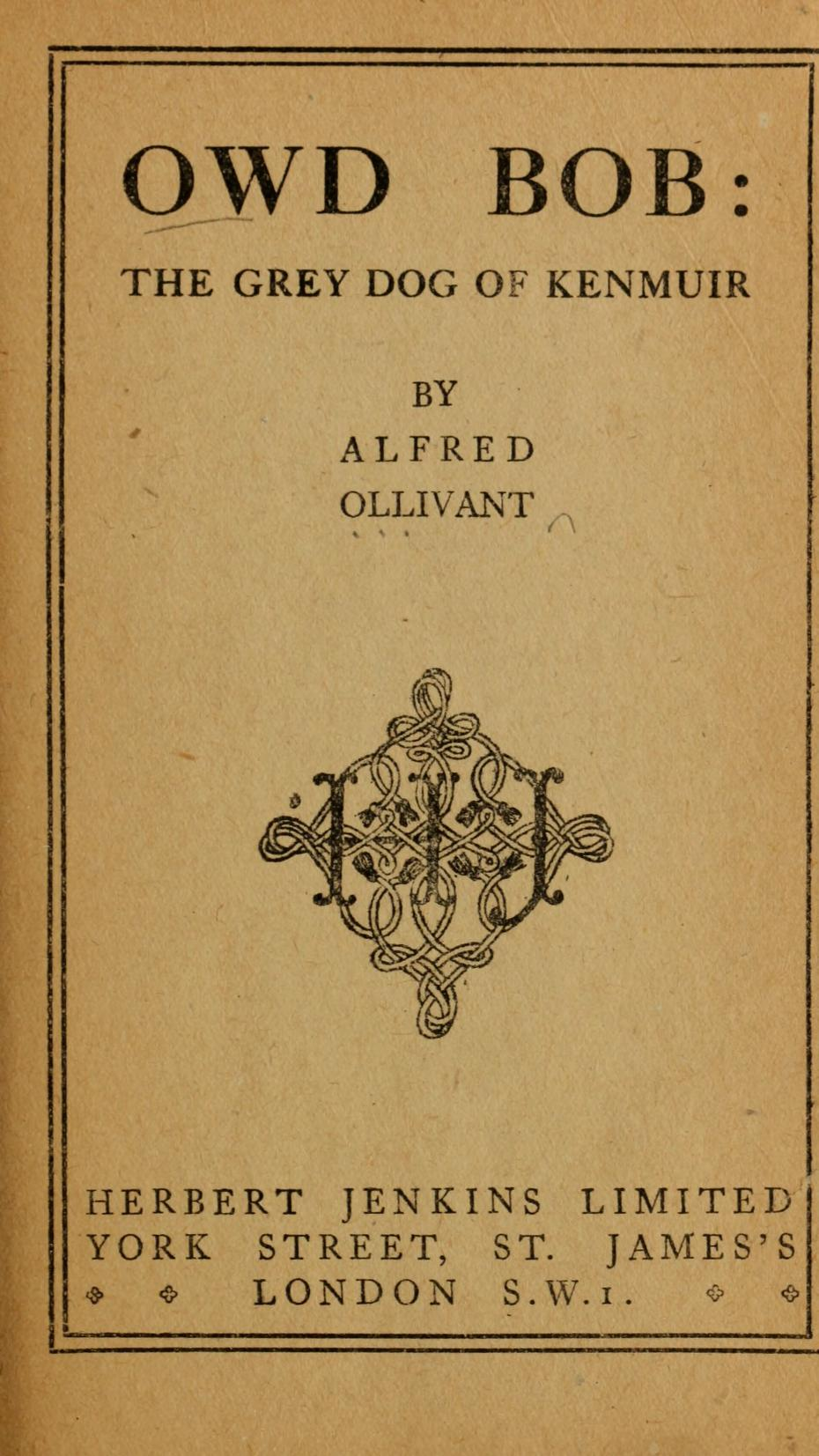
- Title page of the first UK edition (1898)
- Author: Alfred Ollivant
- Language: English
- Publication date: 1898
- Publication place: United Kingdom

Owd Bob: The Grey Dog of Kenmuir, also titled Bob, Son of Battle for US editions, is a children's book by English author Alfred Ollivant. It was published in 1898 and became popular in the United Kingdom and the United States, though most of the dialogue in the book was written in the Cumbrian dialect. The name "Owd Bob" is a rendering of the phrase "Old Bob" in a dialect style.

== Plot ==
The story emphasizes the rivalry between two sheepdogs and their masters, and chronicles the maturing of a boy, David, who is caught between them. His mother dies, and he is left to the care of his father, Adam M'Adam, a sarcastic, angry alcoholic with few redeeming qualities. M'Adam is the owner of Red Wull, a huge, violent dog who herds his sheep by brute force. The other dog is Bob, son of Battle. He herds sheep by finesse and persuasion. His master is James Moore, Master of Kenmuir, who acts as surrogate father to David. David and Moore's daughter Maggie become romantically intrigued by each other. The dogs compete for the Shepherd's Trophy, the prize in an annual sheep-herding contest which is the highlight of the year in the North Country. A dog who wins three competitions in a row wins the Shepherd's Cup outright, which has never happened. Complications arise—a rogue dog is killing sheep, and both Bob and Red Wull are suspected of being the culprit. The story chronicles David's boyhood and early manhood, his struggle to live with his father, his frequent escapes to Kenmuir, and his intermittent friendship with Maggie Moore. Red Wull wins the Shepherd’s Trophy in a year when Bob does not compete. Bob later wins three straight times. Red Wull is found to be the sheep killer, but at M’Adam’s request this fact is kept secret from nearly everyone else. A pack of local dogs attacks Red Wull, who kills many of them before dying himself. M’Adam grieves and is found dead soon after.

== In other media ==
=== Films ===
- Owd Bob (1924), UK
- Owd Bob (1938), UK
- Thunder in the Valley (1947), US
- Owd Bob (1998), UK–Canada

=== Comics ===
- Bob, Son of Battle: A Dell Comics one-shot, issue #729 in Dell's catch-all nigh-weekly comic book, Four Color Comics. Adaptation written by Gaylord Du Bois. Art by Mike Sekowsky.
