= Fay Davis =

American actress

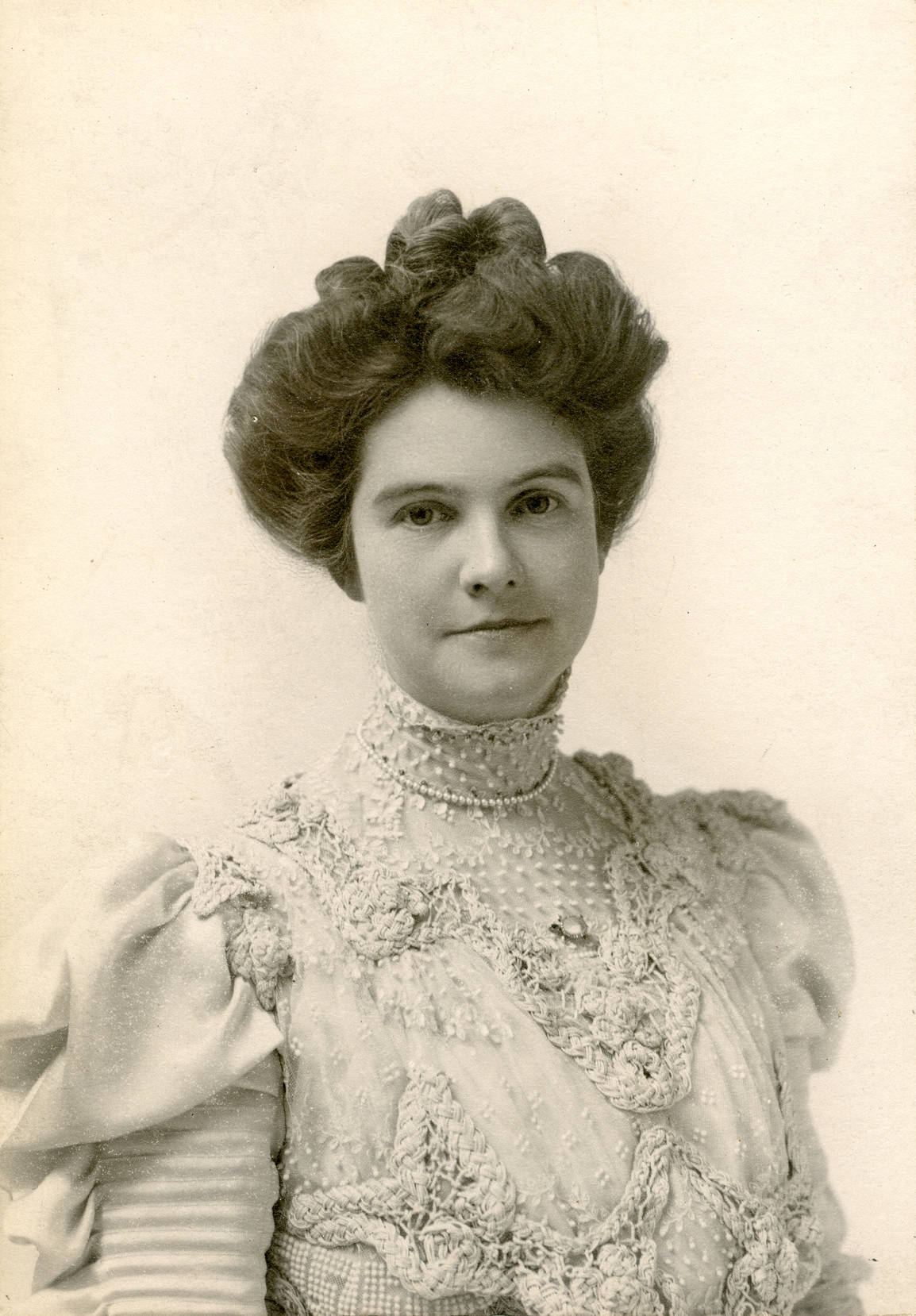
- Davis in 1906
- Born: December 15, 1869; Houlton, Maine, U.S.
- Died: March 1, 1945 (aged 72); Exmouth, England
- Occupation: Actress
- Years active: 1895–1942
- Spouse: Gerald Lawrence (m. 1905)
- Children: 1

Fay Davis (December 15, 1869 – March 1, 1945) was an American stage actress from Houlton, Maine who was a star of many Shakespearean plays.

== Early life ==
Fay Davis was born December 15, 1869 in Houlton, Maine. She later moved to Boston and attended the Winthrop School in Boston and a school of oratory. Davis studied under the monologist Leland Powers. Davis became popular as a reciter in Boston and other places in New England. She also acted as an amateur in her hometown.

== Career ==
Davis came to England in 1895 to join the company of Charles Wyndham. She quickly achieved success as Zoe Nuggetson in A Squire of Dames. In 1896 she went to the St. James's Theatre where she remained five years. At this time she played her first roles in productions of the works of Shakespeare.

Davis with George Alexander, 1898

In 1902 Davis returned to America and made her debut at the Empire Theatre under Charles Frohman. For Frohman, Davis appeared as Wilhelmina in Imprudence.

In the first decade of the twentieth century she acted in a number of London plays, namely Rupert of Hentzau, A Debt of Honour, The Wisdom of the Wise, Iris, and Caesar's Wife. She returned to England in 1906, acting in the provinces and then London. In the latter she appeared in leading roles in Henry V, Romeo and Juliet, The Merchant of Venice, and Twelfth Night.

In 1910 she played in Trelawny of the Wells in London. In 1914 she appeared in a film of Enoch Arden. During World War I Davis was in Searchlights and Daddy Long-Legs. Her final London shows were The Heart of a Child (1921), The Second Mrs. Tanqueray (1922), Secret Service (1926), Hamlet (1930), and The Shadow Princess and On The Rocks (1933). Her final professional appearance was at the Winter Garden Theatre in London in 1933, although she later made two appearances onstage in wartime fundraising galas in 1939 and 1942.

== Personal life ==
She was married to the actor Gerald Lawrence. Their daughter, Marjorie Fay Lawrence (b.1908) was murdered in 1930.

== Death ==
Davis died in Exmouth, England in 1945.
