= Owd Bob (1924 film) =

1924 film

- Directed by: Henry Edwards
- Written by: Alfred Ollivant (novel); Hugh MacLean
- Starring: J. Fisher White; Ralph Forbes; James Carew
- Production company: Atlantic Union
- Distributed by: Novello-Atlas
- Release date: November 1924
- Country: United Kingdom
- Languages: Silent; English intertitles

Owd Bob is a 1924 British drama film directed by Henry Edwards and starring J. Fisher White, Ralph Forbes and James Carew. It is based on the 1898 novel Owd Bob by Alfred Ollivant. Location shooting took place in the Lake District.

== Cast ==
- J. Fisher White as Adam McAdam
- Ralph Forbes as Davie McAdam
- James Carew as James Moore
- Yvonne Thomas as Maggie Moore
- Frank Stanmore as Jim Burton
- Grace Lane as Mrs. Moore
- Robert English as Squire
- John Marlborough East as Shepherd

== Bibliography ==
- Sweet, Matthew. Shepperton Babylon: The Lost Worlds of British Cinema. Faber and Faber, 2005.
