= Jack Denton =

British actor (1872–1949)

John Fleming St. Andrew Denton (11 September 1872 – 19 April 1949) was a British actor and film director of the silent era.

Denton was born in Ashby-de-la-Zouch, Leicestershire and died at age 76 in Redhill, Surrey.

== Selected filmography ==
Actor

- Little Lord Fauntleroy (1914)
- In the Ranks (1914)
- The World, the Flesh and the Devil (1914)
- Flying from Justice (1915)
- She (1916)
- The Bachelor's Club (1921)
- The Card (1922)
- The Fair Maid of Perth (1923)
- The York Mystery (1924)
- Old Bill Through the Ages (1924)
- The Notorious Mrs. Carrick (1924)
- Tons of Money (1924)
- The Gay Corinthian (1924)

Director

- Barnaby (1919)
- A Lass o' the Looms (1919)
- The Heart of a Rose (1919)
- Ernest Maltravers (1920)
- The Twelve Pound Look (1920)
- Lady Audley's Secret (1920)
- Sybil (1921)
