= Joan Ritz =

British actress (c.1882–1956)

Joan Ritz, 1920

Joan Ritz (c. 1882 – 6 November 1956) was a British actress of the silent era.

She was born Jessie Rihll in West Ham, London, UK and died in Brighton, Sussex, England, UK. From 1912 to her death she was married to Percy Nash, who directed numerous of the silent films in which she acted.

== Selected filmography ==
- Enoch Arden (1914)
- The Harbour Lights (1914)
- In the Ranks (1914)
- The Coal King (1915)
- A Rogue's Wife (1915)
- Flying from Justice (1915)
- The Little Minister (1915)
- The Romany Rye (1915)
- Darby and Joan (1920)
- Rodney Stone (1920)
- Hobson's Choice (1920)
- The Croxley Master (1921)
