= Douglas Payne =

British actor (1875–1965)

Douglas Payne (1875 in England – 3 August 1965 in London, England) was a British actor of the silent era.

== Selected filmography ==
- Maria Marten (1913)
- The Harbour Lights (1914)
- In the Ranks (1914)
- Enoch Arden (1914)
- The Little Minister (1915)
- The Romany Rye (1915)
- Master and Man (1915)
- Flying from Justice (1915)
- Fine Feathers (1915)
- The Coal King (1915)
- The Stronger Will (1916)
- A Lass o' the Looms (1919)
- The Heart of a Rose (1919)
- Rodney Stone (1920)
- Won by a Head (1920)
- Potter's Clay (1922)
- Old Bill Through the Ages (1924)
- The Man Who Changed His Name (1928)
- What Next? (1928)
- Red Aces (1929)
- You'd Be Surprised! (1930)
- The Flaw (1933)
