= The Little Minister (1921 film) =

1921 film

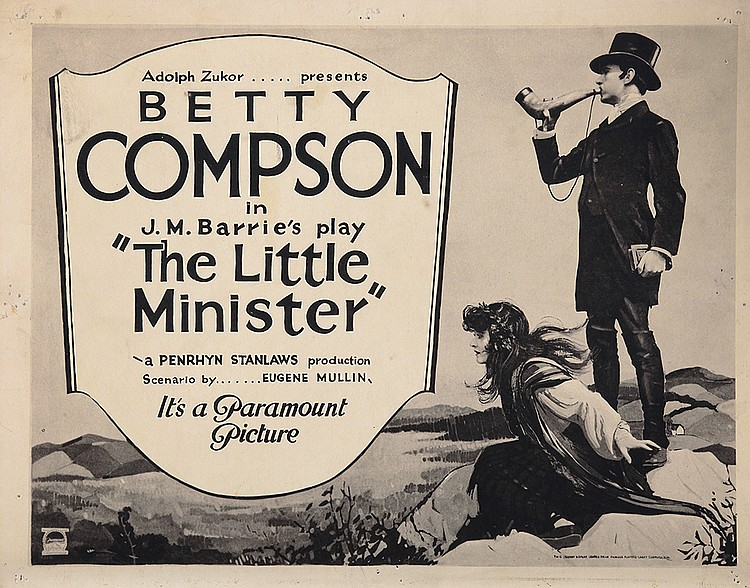
- Lobby card
- Directed by: Penrhyn Stanlaws
- Written by: Edfrim Bingham (scenario)
- Based on: The Little Minister; 1891 novel and play by J. M. Barrie
- Produced by: Adolph Zukor; Jesse L. Lasky
- Starring: Betty Compson; George Hackathorne; Edwin Stevens; Nigel Barrie
- Cinematography: Paul Perry
- Distributed by: Paramount Pictures
- Release date: December 25, 1921
- Running time: 6 reels (6.031 feet)
- Country: United States
- Language: Silent (English intertitles)

The Little Minister. EYE Institut

The Little Minister is a 1921 American silent drama film produced by Famous Players–Lasky and distributed by Paramount Pictures. It is based on an 1891 novel and 1897 play by J. M. Barrie. Betty Compson stars in the film. Earlier film adaptations of Barrie's novel were mad and this one was released within weeks of a version by Vitagraph starring Alice Calhoun.

== Plot ==
As described in a film magazine, when the weavers of Thrums, Scotland, enraged by the reduction in the price of the "web," burn down a factory, Gavin, the "little minister," intervenes with the constables on their behalf. His intervention is resented and he has a clash with Thomas, riot leader and chief elder of the Kirk. The constables are hooted out of town.

Lady Babbie, a supposed young gypsy woman, is suspected of having notified the police against the rioters, but when Gavin questions her, her beauty charms him and he allows her to go. She is in fact Lady Barbara, daughter of the magistrate Lord Rintoul, who knows nothing of her gypsy wanderings. She is engaged to Captain Halliwell, commander of the troops at the barracks. When she hears him order the troops out after the rioters, she decides to warn the weavers who are preparing for the return of the constables or soldiers. Sentinels are posted and told to blow a horn when the military approaches.

Hearing of this, Babbie attempts to blow a horn but fails. When Gavin appears, she induces him to blow the instrument. He becomes enraged when he learns that he has been tricked. The two rejoin the weavers and assist them in escaping. Captain Halliwell orders Babbie's arrest. Disguised in a cloak and hood, she prevails upon Gavin to pass her off as his wife. A reward is then offered for her arrest. Gavin pleads with Lord Rintoul for her release and confesses that he warned the weavers. Babbie has made her escape and, upon returning home, overhears Gavin pleading with her father. Lord Rintoul admires his bravery and, although requested by Captain Halliwell, does not order Gavin's arrest. The Lord says that if Gavin had announced that the gypsy is his wife, she is his under Scottish law.

Gavin is ordered by the elders of the Kirk to resign or leave Thrums, but he refuses. Babbie enters and when she uncovers her head, Lord Rintoul and Captain Halliwell recognize her. They are forced to make the best of the situation and walk away in a rage when Gavin, who loves her, pulls her to his heart.

== Cast ==
- Betty Compson as Babbie
- George Hackathorne as Gavin
- Edwin Stevens as Lord Rintoul
- Nigel Barrie as Captain Halliwell
- Will R. Walling as Doctor McQueen
- Guy Oliver as Thomas Whammond
- Fred Huntley as Peter Tosh
- Robert Brower as Hendry Munn
- Joseph Hazelton as John Spens
- Mary Wilkinson as Nancy Webster

== Preservation ==
Prints of The Little Minister are held by the Eye Filmmuseum, the Cinematheque Royale de Belgique, and the BFI.

== See also ==
- The House That Shadows Built (1931) a promotional film for Paramount with a clip of this movie
