= Percy Nash =

British producer, director and screenwriter

Percy Cromwell Nash
- Born: 5 December 1868; Kensington
- Died: 30 April 1958 (aged 89); Brighton
- Occupations: Film director, screenwriter, producer
- Years active: 1912 - 1932
- Spouses: Vivia Nina Abrahams (m. 1893; div. 1909); Joan Ritz (m. 1912–1956)

Percy Nash (1868-1958) was a pioneer British producer, director and screenwriter, who made some 70 films between 1912 and 1927. He was a key figure in the creation of Elstree Studios.

He was born in Kensington, London.

== Work ==
Nash's prolific career as a director of fiction films, often from works by popular authors of the day, such as Hall Caine and W.P. Drury, was ended by the official condemnation of his 1921 film How Kitchener Was Betrayed. The film suggested that the vessel carrying Lord Kitchener had been sunk by enemy action rather than a mine, leading to a de facto ban on the film in Britain. After this setback, Nash worked on a number of documentary films for the Federation of British Industries on topics including the Manchester Ship Canal, Oxford University Press and the British underwear industry. His wide experience on films with naval subjects saw him work as an advisor on Walter Summers' 1927 film The Battles of Coronel and Falkland Islands.

Up until 2007, the scarcity of information on Nash and his work has meant film historians have neglected his contributions to the development of British cinema.

== Selected filmography ==
- Black-Eyed Susan (1913)
- Enoch Arden (1914)
- In the Ranks (1914)
- The Little Match Girl (1914)
- A Rogue's Wife (1915)
- Flying from Justice (1915)
- Disraeli (1916)
- The Elder Miss Blossom (1918)
- Westward Ho! (1919)
- The Flag Lieutenant (1919)
- Darby and Joan (1920)
- Hobson's Choice (1920)
- Won by a Head (1920)
- How Kitchener Was Betrayed (1921)
- The Croxley Master (1921)
