= Alfred Ollivant (writer) =

English novelist (1874–1927)

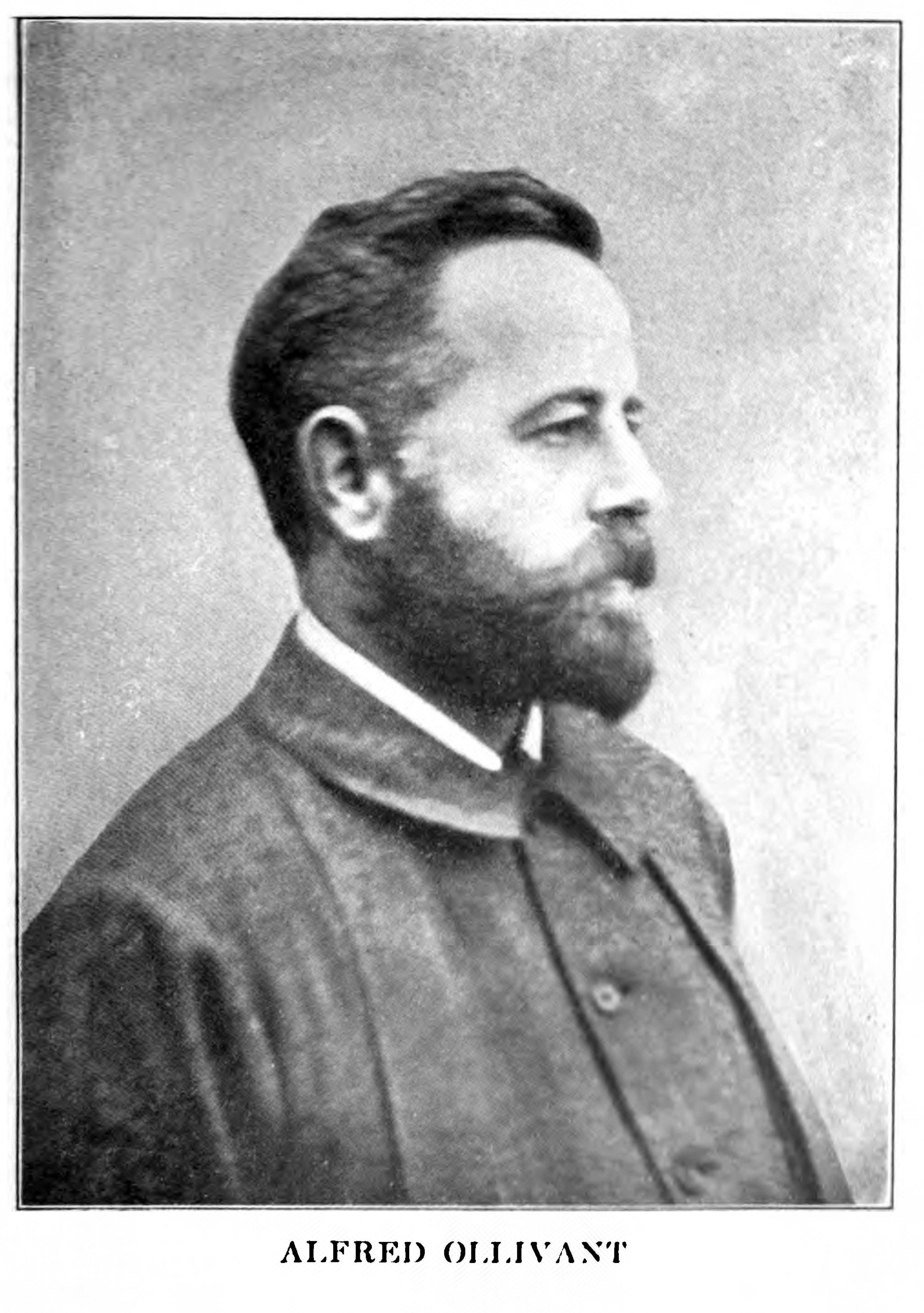
Alfred Ollivant 1912

Alfred Ollivant (1874–1927) was an English novelist, known for his novel Owd Bob. Ollivant also published about a dozen other novels ranging from small-scale cautionary tales to grand historical stories.

== Biography ==
Alfred Ollivant was born in Nuthurst, West Sussex, in 1874 and became a writer after a horse-riding injury ended his brief military career.

Owd Bob, his first novel, was published in 1898. Set in rural Cumbria, in northern England, the novel concerns a suspected sheep-killing collie, Bob. Even though most of the book's dialogue is written in the Cumbrian dialect, it became popular in the United States. Ollivant published a sequel, Danny, in 1902.

He was also a short-story contributor to the magazines The Atlantic Monthly and the Boston Evening Transcript.

=== Death ===
Alfred Ollivant died in London on 19 January 1927.

== Bibliography ==
- Owd Bob – Being the Story of Bob, Son of Battle, The Last of the Grey Dogs of Kenmuir (1898)
- Danny (1902)
- The Redcoat Captain: A Story of That Country (1907)
- The Gentleman: A Romance of the Sea (1908)
- The Taming of John Blunt (1911)
- The Royal Road (1912)
- The Brown Mare, and Other Studies of England under the Cloud (1916)
- Boy Woodburn: A Story of the Sussex Downs (1917)
- Two Men: A Romance of Sussex (1919)
- One Woman: Being the Second Part of a Romance of Sussex (1921)
- Devil Dare (1923)
- Old For-ever: An Epic of Beyond the Indus (1923)
- Boxer & Beauty: A Tale of Two Cart-horses (1924)
- Tomorrow (1927)
- "The Next Step, An Essay on the Missing Policeman Dedicated to the Masses of Mankind, Silent and Suffering" (1919)
