= Paddy the Next Best Thing =

Paddy the Next Best Thing may refer to:

- Paddy the Next Best Thing (novel), a 1912 British novel by Gertrude Page
- Paddy the Next Best Thing (1923 film), a silent British film adaptation
- Paddy the Next Best Thing (1933 film), an American film adaptation
