= Zimbabwean literature =

Zimbabwean literature is literature produced by authors from Zimbabwe or in the Zimbabwean Diaspora. The tradition of literature starts with a long oral tradition, was influenced heavily by western literature that influenced multiple countries in the same region such as Malawi and Zambia whereby these three countries have very similar languages and a lot of words seem to be quite similar only that the tones or infliction or pronunciation is different because during colonial rule most slaves would run away, and acts as a form of protest to the government.

Prominent Zimbabwean writers include Doris Lessing, Dambudzo Marechera, NoViolet Bulawayo, Chenjerai Hove, Yvonne Vera, Stanlake Samkange. and Tsitsi Dangarembga.

== Colonial period ==
Artistic expression often portrays "the melancholy white exile" from Zimbabwe who secretly longs to return home.

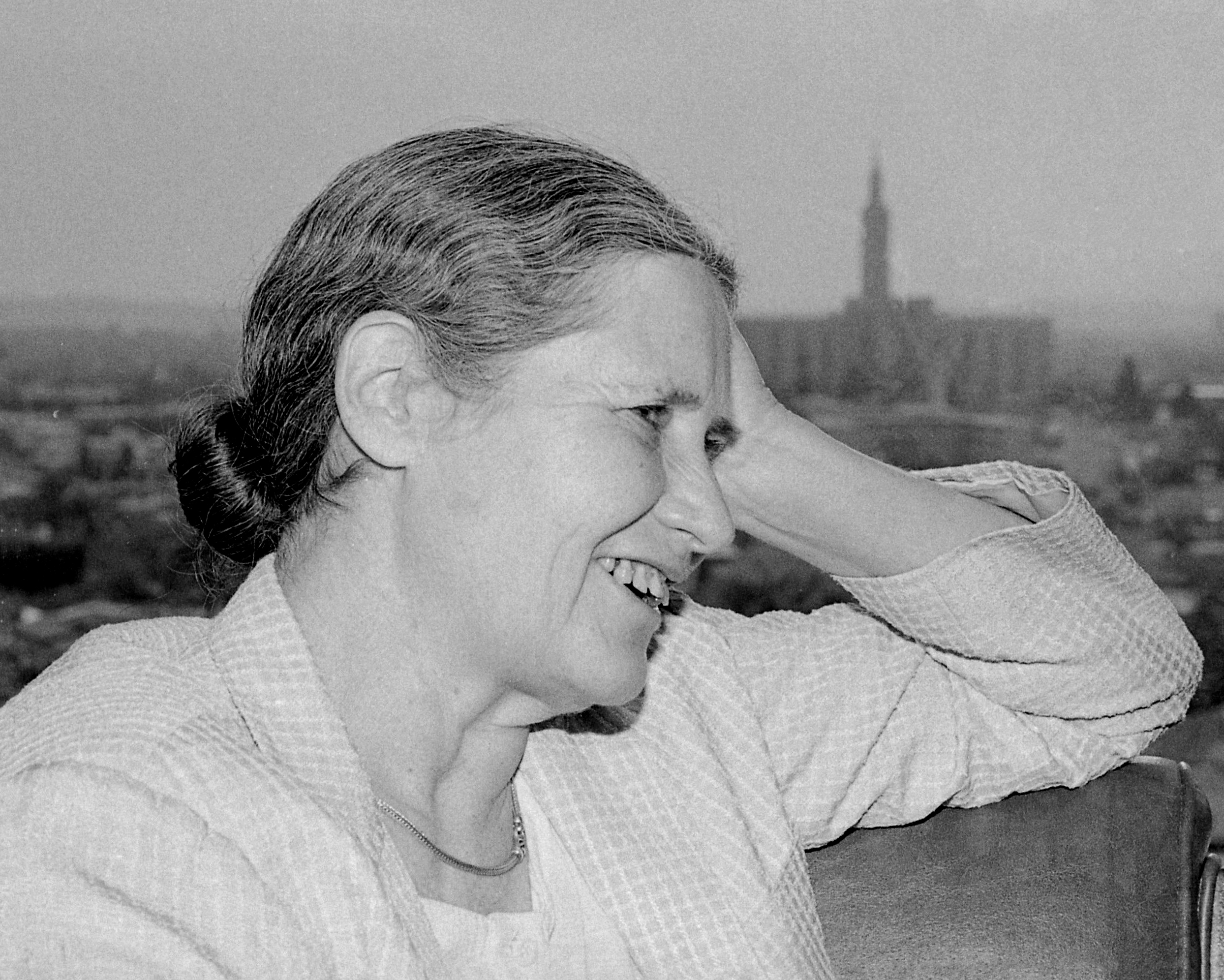
Nobel Prize-winner Doris Lessing in 1984

Gertrude Page's Rhodesia novels were all written between the years 1907 and 1922. These novels included Love in the Wilderness (1907), The Edge O' Beyond (1908) and The Pathway (1914). In The Rhodesian (1914), Page writes admiringly of agricultural productivity and colonial settlement in her "empty" Rhodesian landscapes: "The Valley of Ruins no longer lies alone and unheeded in the sunlight; and no longer do the hills look down upon rich plains left solely to ... idle pleasures." In the novel she imagines Cecil Rhodes as "enslaved and enfolded" by the landscape, an "enchantress who bound men's souls for ever", and wonders whether Rhodesia had been "wife and child" to him, in his solitude. Thus implying that Page imagines Rhodes as a husband and father to the nation. Cynthia Stockley, the South African-born novelist lived in Rhodesia and set several of her novels there such as Virginia of the Rhodesians (1903) and The Claw (1911). As with Page, Stockley's heroes are heavily impacted by the powerful African landscape: "Africa has kissed him on the mouth and he will not leave her." In The Claw, she wrote of the country's empty landscapes that allowed for both personal freedom and expansion of the soul: "The world seemed filled with gracious dimness and made up of illimitable space. An indescribable feeling of happy freedom filled my heart. It seemed to me that the lungs of my soul drew breath and expanded as they had never done in any land before." Although Stockley shows a commitment to Rhodesian patriotism in her novels, her nationalism shifted towards Union with South Africa in Tagati (1930).

Nobel Prize for Literature recipient, Doris Lessing, lived in Southern Rhodesia between 1924 and 1949. Her debut novel The Grass Is Singing (1950), about a relationship between a white woman and a black man, is set in Southern Rhodesia of the late 1940s. The novel begins with a newspaper announcement of a white woman's murder on the veld: "The newspaper did not say much. People all over the country must have glanced at the paragraph with its sensational heading and felt a little spurt of anger mingled with what was almost satisfaction, as if some belief had been confirmed, as if something had happened which could only have been expected. When natives steal, murder or rape, that is the feeling white people have." The novel was subsequently banned in the country and Lessing barred from re-entering until independence in 1980.

In 1964, Two Tone, a quarterly publication was launched, it aimed to publish both black and white writers. Philippa Berlyn, a co-founder, held the belief that an independent Rhodesia would need to accommodate both black and white citizens and her quarterly could be an outlet where poets from different races could listen to one another. Poets that contributed to the quarterly included Dambudzo Marechera, Shimmer Chinodya, Musaemura Zimunya and Colin Style. The founders were acolytes of the Rhodesian Front and would censor some poetry that was offered to them. Occasionally guest editors published poetry by black writers that was in opposition to the view of the Two Tone founders of a shared national loyalty between the two races. A guest editor published Henry Pote's “To a White Child,” addressing a white child that will be eventually be taught to mistrust and despise him. Two Tone also published Kizito Muchemwa's “Tourists,” which refers to White Rhodesians at the time, rejecting the notion of a shared nationality between black and white.

Once the Rhodesian Bush War came to the forefront in 1972 and emigration increased, white poets became less confident in expressing their own identity and more frequently the poems appearing in Two Tone and Rhodesian Poetry were about the experiences of war. John Eppel, was conscripted repeatedly during the final years of the war and in his poem “Spoils of War”, he recalls looking at the bodies of guerrillas killed during a contact:

Sarge tells me to save my tears
for the civilians these gooks have slaughtered.
But I am not thinking of them, and I
cannot explain that I am being purged
of my Rhodesianism. That ugly
word with its jagged edge is opening
me. . . . I move to the past tense.

Colin Style was awarded the Ingrid Jonker Prize for best published collection in English in Southern Africa, 1977 with Baobab Street (1977). He wrote with unashamed nostalgia for his native country's veld, its disappearance among new building developments and for Rhodesia itself. In “The Cemetery,” the life and culture of a Rhodesia that will become a memory are presented as detached from the present as a San rock painting:

The soil is fine:
it mingles with my sweat and stains red in my sandal,
muddy itching ochre seeping into mind
while in their crevices and caves the rock-imprinted impala
restlessly stir.

N. H. Brettell was also a significant poet in the country since publishing Bronze Frieze: Poems Mostly Rhodesian (1950). In a 1978 academic essay on Rhodesian poetry, Graham Robin wrote that “Brettell puts into words the halting stupefaction of the exile in such a new and strange land. At last Rhodesia has a poet possessed by his country; but amazed, almost reluctantly possessed." Brettell also befriended the poet, short story writer and Anglican priest, Arthur Shearly Cripps. Cripps was critical of the British South Africa Company and settler rule. He was the most widely represented writer in Rhodesian Verse, 1888–1938, the first anthology of Rhodesian poetry (edited by John Snelling). In the post-war period and in his final years, Cripps published poetry in Labour Front, which provided a platform for white radicalism. Left-leaning white writers also wrote for the Central African Examiner (1957-1965), where writers engaged with race, statehood and universal suffrage. The poetry was often satiric, subverting the political ideology and claims of the federal and Southern Rhodesian establishment. The publication ceased publication in 1965 due to the censorship laws put in place in the wake of Rhodesia's Unilateral Declaration of Independence. Hundreds of mostly partisan novels were also published in the UDI era of the 1960s and 1970s by white writers in the country supporting the Smith government. In the final years of UDI Rhodesia, Rhodesian poetry that encompassed the work of both black and white writers was seen as inappropriate by many black writers. In 1978, Kizito Muchemwa edited Zimbabwean Poetry in English: An Anthology, a collection that only contained the work of black writers. The use of Zimbabwean rather than Rhodesian as a term of identity was regarded as subversive at the time. The principal theme of this anthology is love of the land, portrayed as mother, lover and muse. Dambudzo Marechera contrasts the time when 'I was yours/and you were mine' with the disenfranchised present:

Now a man
in exile from the warmth of your arms
and the milk of your teeth
the breath of your secret whispers in my ears
shall 1 not stride back to you with haste
rout all my enemies and bind the wicked husbandmen
Shall I not kneel to kiss the grains of your sand
to rise naked before you — a bowl of incense?
and the smoke of my nakedness shall be
an offering to you
pledging my soul

== Post-independence ==
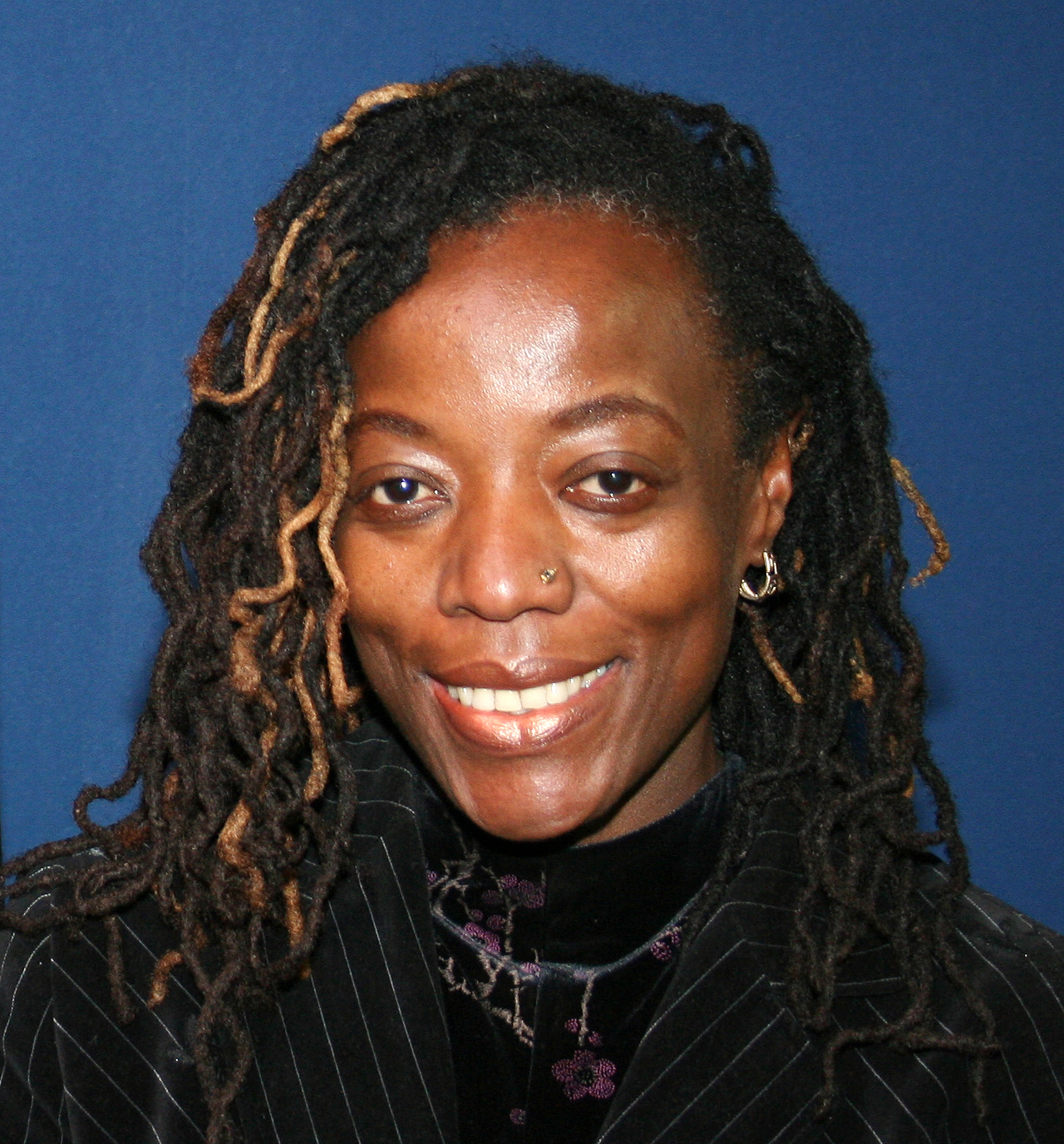
Tsitsi Dangarembga in 2006

Tsitsi Dangarembga wrote Nervous Conditions (1988), notable at the time as the first published novel that had been written in English by a black Zimbabwean woman. It was celebrated as one of the 20th century's most significant works of African literature. The story is set in then Rhodesia, following a young black girl, Tambudzai in her quest to get an education amid the backdrop of racism and gender inequality. It is the first book in a trilogy that was followed by The Book of Not (2006) and This Mournable Body (2020).

== See also ==
- List of Zimbabwean writers
