= 1908 in literature =

This article contains information about the literary events and publications of 1908.

== Events ==
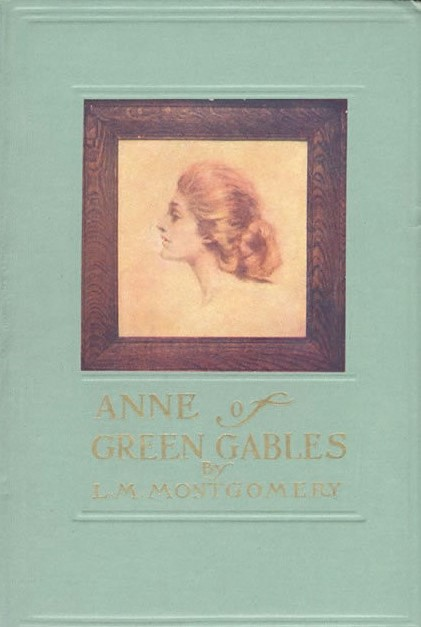
1st ed.

- February 15 – The weekly boys' story paper The Magnet is first published in London, containing "The Making of Harry Wharton", the first serial story of the fictional Greyfriars School written by Charles Hamilton as Frank Richards and introducing the character of Billy Bunter.
- March – Ezra Pound leaves America for Europe. In April, he moves to Venice, where in July he publishes himself his first collection of poems, A Lume Spento (dedicated to his friend, the Philadelphia artist William Brooke Smith, who has just died of tuberculosis). In August he settles in London, where he will remain until 1920. In December, Pound publishes A Quinzaine for this Yule.
- June 18 – Mark Twain buys a house in Redding, Connecticut.
- Summer – The Marlowe Society stages a production at the New Theatre, Cambridge (England), of Milton's masque Comus, directed by Rupert Brooke.
- July – Katherine Mansfield moves to London; she will never return to her native New Zealand.
- September 30 – Maurice Maeterlinck's The Blue Bird (L'Oiseau bleu) is premièred, at Konstantin Stanislavsky's Moscow Art Theatre.
- October 3 – The Avenida Theatre opens on Buenos Aires' Avenida de Mayo with a production of Lope de Vega's El castigo sin venganza (Justice Without Revenge, 1631) directed by María Guerrero.
- November 10 – Opening of a production of Euripides' The Bacchae directed by William Poel in Gilbert Murray's verse translation at the Royal Court Theatre in London under the management of Harley Granville-Barker with his wife Lillah McCarthy in the role of Dionysus.
- November 18 – The release in France of La Mort du duc de Guise marks the first film with a screenplay by an eminent man of letters, the playwright Henri Lavedan; it is also directed by two men of the theatre, Charles Le Bargy and André Calmettes, and features actors of the Comédie-Française.
- December – Ford Madox Hueffer begins publication of the literary magazine The English Review in London. The first issue contains original work by Thomas Hardy, Henry James, Joseph Conrad, John Galsworthy and W. H. Hudson, and begins serialization of H. G. Wells's realist semi-autobiographical satirical novel Tono-Bungay.
- December 1 – Cuala Press, set up at Churchtown, Dublin, as a private press independent of the former Dun Emer Press in connection with the Irish Literary Revival and Arts and Crafts movement by Elizabeth "Lolly" Yeats with editorial support from her brother W. B. Yeats, produces its first publication, Poetry and Ireland: Essays by W. B. Yeats and Lionel Johnson (died 1902).
- unknown dates
  - Ethiopian linguist Afevork Ghevre Jesus's ልብ ፡ ወለድ ፡ ታሪክ ። (Libb Wolled Tārīk, "A Heart-Born Story"), the first novel in Amharic, is published in Rome.
  - The Malay tale Hikayat Hang Tuah (c. 1700) is first published, edited by Sulaiman bin Muhammed Nur and William Shellabear.
  - The Romanian writer Urmuz is known to be working on his manuscript stories, the Bizarre Pages, printed only after 1922.

== New books ==
=== Fiction ===
- Afevork Ghevre Jesus – Libb Wolled Tārīk (A Heart-Born Story)
- Leonid Andreyev – The Seven Who Were Hanged
- Francis Aveling – Arnoul the Englishman
- Arnold Bennett
  - Buried Alive
  - The Old Wives' Tale
- E. F. Benson – The Blotting Book
- Bigehuan zhuren (碧荷館主人) – New Era (新紀元, Xīn Jìyuán)
- Algernon Blackwood – John Silence, Physician Extraordinary
- Alexander Bogdanov – Red Star
- Mary Elizabeth Braddon – During Her Majesty's Pleasure
- Rhoda Broughton – Mamma
- G. K. Chesterton – The Man Who Was Thursday
- Marie Corelli – Holy Orders
- James Oliver Curwood – The Courage of Captain Plum and The Gold Hunters
- Machado de Assis – Memorial de Aires
- Grazia Deledda – L'edera (The Ivy, first Italian publication)
- Mary and Jane Findlater – Crossriggs
- Anatole France – Penguin Island
- E. M. Forster – A Room with a View
- John Fox, Jr. – The Trail of the Lonesome Pine
- Mary E. Wilkins Freeman – The Shoulders of Atlas
- Maxim Gorky
  - The Life of a Useless Man
  - A Confession
- Jeannie Gunn – We of the Never Never
- Robert Hichens – A Spirit in Prison
- William Hope Hodgson – The House on the Borderland
- Gaston Leroux – The Perfume of the Lady in Black
- Jack London – The Iron Heel
- W. Somerset Maugham – The Magician
- José Toribio Medina – Los Restos Indígenas de Pichilemu
- Natsume Sōseki (夏目 漱石)
  - The Miner (Kōfu, 坑夫)
  - Sanshirō (三四郎)
  - Ten Nights of Dreams (Yume Jū-ya, 夢十夜, short stories)
- Baroness Orczy – The Elusive Pimpernel
- Gertrude Page
  - The Edge O' Beyond
  - Paddy the Next Best Thing
- Mary Roberts Rinehart – The Circular Staircase
- Arthur Schnitzler – Der Weg ins Freie
- Georges Sorel – Reflections on Violence
- H. De Vere Stacpoole – The Blue Lagoon
- Hermann Sudermann – The Song of Songs
- Caton Theodorian – Sângele Solovenilor
- Edgar Wallace
  - Angel Esquire
  - The Council of Justice
- Robert Walser – Der Gehülfe (The Assistant)
- Mary Augusta Ward – The Testing of Diana Mallory
- Jakob Wassermann – Caspar Hauser oder Die Trägheit des Herzens (Caspar Hauser or the Inertia of the Heart)
- H. G. Wells – The War in the Air

=== Children and young people ===
1st ed.

- L. Frank Baum
  - Dorothy and the Wizard in Oz
  - Aunt Jane's Nieces at Millville (as Edith Van Dyne)
- The Children's Encyclopædia (begins publication)
- Kenneth Grahame – The Wind in the Willows
- Selma Lagerlöf – The Girl from the Marsh Croft
- Lucy Maud Montgomery – Anne of Green Gables
- Ferenc Móra – Rab ember fiai (Sons of a Captive)
- E. Nesbit – The House of Arden
- Beatrix Potter
  - The Tale of Jemima Puddle-Duck
  - The Tale of Samuel Whiskers or The Roly-Poly Pudding
- Percy F. Westerman – A Lad of Grit

=== Drama ===
- J. M. Barrie – What Every Woman Knows
- Jacinto Benavente – Señora ama (The Lady Loves)
- Tristan Bernard – The Brighton Twins (Les Jumeaux de Brighton)
- Alexandre Bisson – Madame X (La Femme X)
- Hall Caine – Pete (new version of The Manxman)
- Maxim Gorky – The Last Ones (Poslednje)
- Maurice Maeterlinck – The Blue Bird (L'Oiseau bleu)
- Octave Mirbeau – Home (Le Foyer)
- Emma Orczy – Beau Brocade
- Alicia Ramsey – Byron
- W. Graham Robertson – Pinkie and the Fairies
- Edward Sheldon – Salvation Nell
- J. M. Synge – The Tinker's Wedding
- Hans Wiers-Jenssen – Anne Pedersdotter (translated as The Witch)
- Israel Zangwill – The Melting Pot

=== Poetry ===
- Edward Carpenter – Iolaus: Anthology of Friendship
- W. H. Davies – Nature Poems
- Maria Konopnicka – Rota (Oath)

=== Non-fiction ===
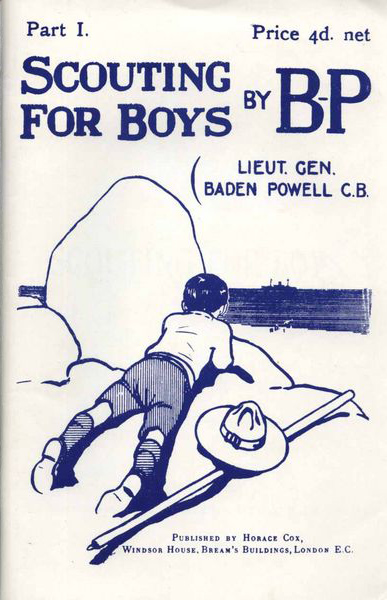
Cover of Robert Baden-Powell's Scouting for Boys, 1st part

- Robert Baden-Powell – Scouting for Boys
- Sarah Bernhardt – My Double Life
- Annie Besant, C. W. Leadbeater – Occult Chemistry
- Edward Carpenter – The Intermediate Sex: A Study of Some Transitional Types of Men and Women
- G. K. Chesterton – All Things Considered
- W. H. Davies – The Autobiography of a Super-Tramp
- Levi H. Dowling – The Aquarian Gospel of Jesus the Christ
- Gertrude Jekyll – Colour in the Flower Garden
- Jack London – War of the Classes
- Francisco I. Madero – La sucesión presidencial en 1910
- Titu Maiorescu – Critice (Critical Essays)
- Friedrich Nietzsche (died 1900) – Ecce homo: Wie man wird, was man ist (written 1888)
- M. Ostrogorski – Democracy and the Organization of Political Parties (La Démocratie et l'organisation des partis politiques, 1903)
- George Panu – Amintiri de la Junimea din Iași (Recollections from Junimea of Iași; first volume)
- Charlotte Carmichael Stopes – The Sphere of 'Man' in Relation to that of 'Woman' in the Constitution
- Thomas Traherne (died 1674) – Centuries of Meditations, now first printed from the author's manuscript
- Alfred R. Tucker – Eighteen Years in Uganda and East Africa

== Births ==
- January 9 – Simone de Beauvoir, French feminist philosopher (died 1986)
- January 16 – Pavel Nilin, Soviet novelist and playwright (died 1981)
- January 18 – Jacob Bronowski, Polish-born scientist and poet (died 1974)
- January 20
  - Fleur Cowles, American journalist, editor and illustrator (died 2009)
  - Jean S. MacLeod, Scottish-English romantic novelist (died 2011)
- February 1 – Leonard Gribble, English novelist (died 1985)
- February 4 – Julian Bell, English poet (killed 1937)
- February 11 – Philip Dunne, American screenwriter, director, and producer (died 1992)
- February 29 – Dee Brown, American novelist and historian (died 2002)
- March 2 – Olivia Manning, English playwright and novelist (died 1980)
- March 5 – Irving Fiske, American playwright, WPA writer, and speaker; co-founder of Quarry Hill Creative Center (died 1990),
- March 6 – Dame Felicitas Corrigan, English writer and Benedictine nun (died 2003)
- March 8 – Ebrahim Al-Arrayedh, Indian-born Bahraini poet (died 2002)
- March 22 – Louis L'Amour, American author (died 1988)
- April 12 – Ida Pollock, British romantic novelist (died 2013)
- May 17 – Frederic Prokosch, American novelist and poet (died 1989)
- May 20 – Aleksei Arbuzov, Soviet playwright (died 1986)
- May 25 – Theodore Roethke, American poet (died 1963)
- May 27 – Peggy Ramsay, born Margaret Venniker, Australian-born British theatrical agent (died 1991)
- May 28 – Ian Fleming, English espionage novelist (died 1964)
- June 1 – Julie Campbell Tatham, American children's writer (died 1999)
- June 14 – Kathleen Raine, English poet, scholar, and translator (died 2003)
- June 25 – John Sommerfield, English communist writer (died 1991)
- June 27 – João Guimarães Rosa, Brazilian novelist (died 1967)
- June 30
  - Winston Graham, English novelist (died 2003)
  - Rob Nieuwenhuys, Dutch writer (died 1999)
- July 7 – Laurie Fitzhardinge, Australian historian and librarian (died 1993)
- July 10 – Carl Richard Jacobi, American journalist and author (died 1997)
- July 23 – Elio Vittorini, Italian author (died 1966)
- August 21 – M. M. Kaye, Indian-born English novelist and autobiographer (died 2004)
- August 23 – Arthur Adamov, French Absurdist playwright (died 1970)
- August 28
  - Robert Merle, French novelist (died 2004)
  - Marguerite Young, American novelist, poet and biographer (died 1995)
- August 31 – William Saroyan, American writer (d. 1981)
- September 4 – Richard Wright, African-American novelist and poet (died 1960)
- September 9 – Cesare Pavese, Italian poet and novelist (suicide 1950)
- September 15 – Miško Kranjec, Slovenian writer (died 1983)
- September 17 – John Creasey, English crime writer (died 1973)
- October 5 – Joshua Logan, American stage and film writer and director (died 1988)
- October 13 – Robert Liddell, English biographer, novelist and poet (died 1992)
- October 17 – Leon Kalustian, Romanian journalist, essayist and memoirist (died 1990)
- October 23 – Abdurakhman Avtorkhanov, Chechen historian (died 1997)
- October 24 – Phyllis Shand Allfrey (Phyllis Byam Shand), Dominican writer (died 1986)
- October 25 – Edmond Pidoux, Swiss writer (died 2004)
- November 8 – Zhou Yang, Chinese literary theorist (died 1989)
- November 8 – Martha Gellhorn, American journalist (suicide 1998)
- November 9 – Lucian Boz, Romanian and Australian literary critic (died 2003)
- November 20 – Alistair Cooke, English-born American journalist (died 2004)
- November 21 – Elizabeth George Speare, American children's writer (died 1994)
- November 23 – Nelson S. Bond, American author, playwright and scriptwriter (died 2006)
- November 28
  - Claude Lévi-Strauss, Belgian-born French anthropologist (died 2009)
  - Mary Oppen, American poet, activist and photographer (died 1990)
- November 30 – Buddhadeb Bosu, Bengali poet and writer (died 1974)
- December 14 – Mária Szepes, Hungarian novelist and screenwriter (died 2007)
- December 22 – Giovanni Luigi Bonelli, Italian comic book author and writer (died 2001)
- December 25 – Quentin Crisp, English gay icon, author and raconteur (died 1999)

== Deaths ==
- January 9 – Wilhelm Busch, German humorist and poet (born 1832)
- January 14 – Holger Drachmann, Danish poet and dramatist (born 1846)
- January 18 – Edmund Clarence Stedman, American poet and critic (born 1833)
- January 25 – Ouida (Maria Louise Ramé), English novelist (born 1839)
- February 7
  - Alexander Ertel, Russian novelist and short story writer (born 1855)
  - Manuel Curros Enríquez, Spanish Galician writer (born 1851)
- February 17 – Annie Ryder Gracey, American author and missionary (born 1836)
- March 4 – Mrs. Henry Clarke (Amy Key), English historical novelist and children's writer (born 1853)
- March 11 – Edmondo De Amicis, Italian novelist (born 1846)
- March 12 – Susan Marr Spalding, American poet (born 1841)
- March 19 – Eduard Zeller, German philosopher (born 1814)
- March 25 – Aleksey Zhemchuzhnikov, Russian poet, dramatist and critic (born 1821)
- March 29
  - Eliza Trask Hill, American journalist and activist (born 1840)
  - Esther Pugh, American editor and publisher (born 1834)
- April 20 – Henry Chadwick, English-born American baseball writer and historian (born 1824)
- May 7 – Ludovic Halévy, French playwright and author (born 1834)
- May 23 – François Coppée, French author, le poète des humbles (born 1842)
- June 5 – Jonas Lie, Norwegian writer (born 1944)
- June 16 – Mary Elizabeth Hawker, Scottish-born English fiction writer (born 1848)
- June 20 – Eleanor Kirk, American author, publisher (born 1831)
- July 3 – Joel Chandler Harris, American journalist and author (born 1848)
- July 28 – Otto Pfleiderer, German theologian (born 1839)
- July 29 – Estelle M. H. Merrill, American journalist and editor (born 1858)
- August 4 – Bronson Howard, American dramatist (born 1842)
- August 10 – Louise Chandler Moulton, American author and critic (born 1835)
- August 14 – Anton Giulio Barrili, Italian novelist (born 1836)
- September 29 – Machado de Assis, Brazilian writer (born 1839)
- November 1 – Julia Abigail Fletcher Carney, American educator, poet, author, and editor (born 1823)
- November 8

- Josephine E. Keating, American literary critic and musician (born 1838)
- Victorien Sardou, French dramatist (born 1831)

- December 5 – Mary H. Graves, American minister, literary editor, writer (born 1839)

== Awards ==
- Nobel Prize for Literature: Rudolf Christoph Eucken
- Newdigate Prize: Julian Huxley, "Holyrood"
