= Titheradge =

Titheradge is a surname. Notable people with the surname include:

- Dion Titheradge (1889–1934), Australian-born actor and writer of revues, plays, and screenplays
- George Sutton Titheradge (1848–1916), English-Australian actor
- Madge Titheradge (1887–1961), Australian-born actress
