= Love in the Wilderness (novel) =

1907 novel by Gertrude Page

- Early edition
- Author: Gertrude Page
- Language: English
- Genre: Romance
- Publisher: Hurst and Blackett
- Publication date: 1907
- Publication place: United Kingdom
- Media type: Print

Love in the Wilderness is a 1907 novel by the British writer Gertrude Page. It was her debut and breakthrough novel, which she followed with the even more successful Paddy the Next Best Thing the following year. The novel takes place in Rhodesia, which Page had herself emigrated to with her husband several years earlier.

== Adaptation ==
In 1920 it was made into a British silent film of the same title directed by Alexander Butler and starring Madge Titheradge.

== Bibliography ==
- Block, Andrew. Key Books of British Authors, 1600-1932. D. Archer, 1933.
- Goble, Alan. The Complete Index to Literary Sources in Film. Walter de Gruyter, 1999.
- John, Juliet. The Oxford Handbook of Victorian Literary Culture. Oxford University Press, 2016.
