= Linked by Fate =

Linked by Fate may refer to:

- Linked by Fate (novel), a 1903 novel by Charles Garvice
- Linked by Fate (film), a 1919 film adaptation directed by Albert Ward
