= A Place in the Sun (1916 film) =

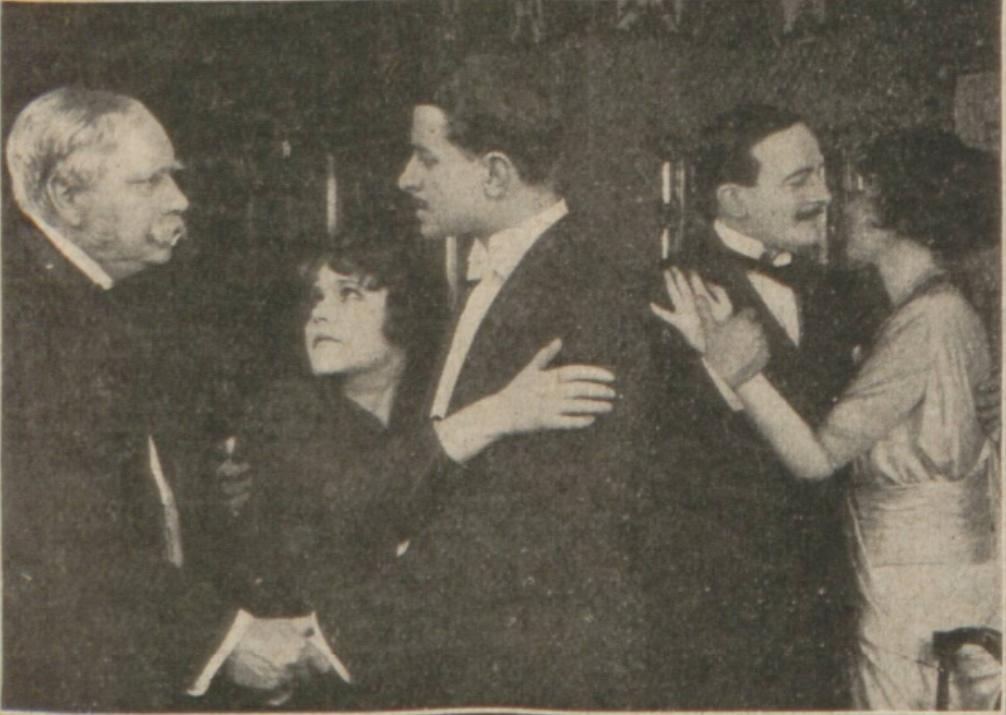
- Directed by: Laurence Trimble
- Written by: Laurence Trimble
- Based on: A Place in the Sun; 1913 play by Cyril Harcourt
- Produced by: Florence Turner
- Starring: Reginald Owen; Marguerite Blanche; Malcolm Cherry
- Production company: Florence Turner Productions
- Distributed by: Butcher's Film Service; Triangle Distributing (US)
- Release date: June 1916
- Running time: 5 reels
- Country: United Kingdom
- Languages: Silent; English intertitles

A Place in the Sun is a 1916 British silent drama film directed by Laurence Trimble and starring Reginald Owen, Marguerite Blanche and Malcolm Cherry. In 1919 it was released in the United States by the Triangle Film Corporation.

== Cast ==
- Reginald Owen as Stuart Capel
- Marguerite Blanche as Rosie Blair
- Malcolm Cherry as Dick Blair
- Lydia Bilbrook as Marjorie Capel
- Campbell Gullan as Arthur Blagden
- Lyston Lyle as Sir John Capel
- Frances Wetherall as Mrs. Moultrie
- John MacAndrews as Ben Goodge

== Bibliography ==
- Low, Rachael. The History of British Film (Volume 3): The History of the British Film 1914 - 1918. Routledge, 2013.
