= Her Story (1920 film) =

1920 film

- Directed by: Alexander Butler
- Written by: Dion Titheradge; William B. Laub
- Produced by: G. B. Samuelson
- Starring: Madge Titheradge; Campbell Gullan; C. M. Hallard
- Production company: G. B. Samuelson Productions
- Distributed by: General Film Distributors
- Release date: June 1920 (UK)
- Running time: 5 reels
- Country: United Kingdom
- Language: Silent (English intertitles)

Her Story is a 1920 British silent drama film directed by Alexander Butler and starring Madge Titheradge, Campbell Gullan, and C. M. Hallard. A happily married woman's life is thrown into turmoil when a Russian criminal from her past escapes from jail and comes to visit her. It was one of several films made by the British producer G. B. Samuelson at Universal City in California.

== Plot ==
As described in a film magazine, an elaborate fancy dress ball at the country estate of Ralph Ashelyn (Hallard) is disrupted when Mrs. Betty Ashelyn (Titheradge) is discovered hiding an escaped convict in her room. She refuses to make any explanation concerning the presence of the convict and, realizing that there will be a sensational story in the newspapers, she starts off in an automobile for her husbands office in the city. The film then uses a flashback to delineate the story she is telling her husband. When young, she spent much time at sea with her father Thorpe, the captain of the vessel. When he dies at sea, she assumes command and takes the ship to the port of Riga in the Russian Empire. There she meets Oscar Kaplan (Gullan), a steamship agent, who pays her marked attention and finally proposes marriage. In her loneliness she finally accepts and they are married. Later, in New York City, Oscar is arrested for theft, so she goes to work in a store. There, in the toy department, she makes the acquaintance of the little daughter of Ralph Ashelyn, a steel millionaire, who engages her as the child's governess. Ralph falls in love with the governess, and she discovers that the marriage contract between her and Oscar is fraudulent and she has never been legally married. She finally accepts Ashelyn and is happy in his love and her beautiful home, but makes the mistake of not telling him of her former marriage. Oscar escapes from prison and makes his way to the Ashelyn country place, arriving there during the ball. He compels Betty to hide him under threats of exposing her. Oscar is discovered by the police and great excitement ensues. Betty then races to the city, tells her husband the story, and he forgives her for her deception.

== Credited cast ==
- Madge Titheradge as Betty Thorpe
- Campbell Gullan as Oscar Kaplan
- C. M. Hallard as Ralph Ashelyn

== Bibliography ==
- Low, Rachael. History of the British Film, 1918-1929. George Allen & Unwin, 1971.
