= They Just Had to Get Married =

1932 film

- Directed by: Edward Ludwig
- Written by: Gladys Lehman; H.M. Walker; Preston Sturges (uncredited); Clarence J. Marks (add'l dialogue)
- Based on: A Pair of Silk Stockings; 1914 play by Cyril Harcourt
- Produced by: Carl Laemmle Jr.
- Starring: Slim Summerville; ZaSu Pitts; Roland Young; Verree Teasdale
- Cinematography: Edward Snyder
- Edited by: Ted J. Kent
- Music by: James Dietrich
- Production company: Universal Pictures
- Distributed by: Universal Pictures
- Release date: December 22, 1932 (San Diego); January 5, 1933 (U.S.)
- Running time: 69 minutes
- Country: United States
- Language: English

They Just Had to Get Married is a 1932 American pre-Code comedy film directed by Edward Ludwig and starring Slim Summerville, ZaSu Pitts, Roland Young, and Verree Teasdale.

The screenplay was written by Gladys Lehman, H.M. Walker, and an uncredited Preston Sturges, based on the Broadway play A Pair of Silk Stockings (1914) by Cyril Harcourt. This was the play's third film adaptation.

== Plot ==
When wealthy Henry Davidson dies, he leaves all his money to his faithful butler, Sam Sutton, and maid, Molly Hull, who are finally able to get married. Their new lives as millionaires gets them involved with flirtatious Lola Montrose and Davidson's relative Hillary Hume, and complications ensue.

Sam and Molly lose everything, break up, and are finally tricked into reconciling.

== Cast ==
- Slim Summerville as Sam Sutton
- ZaSu Pitts as Molly Hull
- Roland Young as Hillary Hume
- Verree Teasdale as Lola Montrose
- C. Aubrey Smith as Hampton
- Robert Greig as Radcliff
- David Landau as Montrose
- Elizabeth Patterson as Lizzie
- Wallis Clark as Fairchilds
- David Leo Tillotson as Wilmont
- Vivien Oakland as Mrs. Fairchilds
- William Burress as Bradford
- Louise Mackintosh as Mrs. Bradford
- Bertram Marburgh as Langley
- Virginia Howell as Mrs. Langley
- James Donlan as Clerk
- Henry Armetta as Tony
- Fifi D'Orsay as Marie
- Cora Sue Collins as Rosalie

== Production ==
The original title of this film was They Had to Get Married. However, the Hays Office disapproved of this title, and requested the addition of the word "just". They Just Had to Get Married was the third film version of Cyril Harcourt's 1914 play, A Pair of Silk Stockings. The first two were both silent films: a 1918 Lewis J. Selznick presentation also called A Pair of Silk Stockings, and a 1927 Universal film Silk Stockings. These films are unrelated to the 1957 film, Silk Stockings, a musical remake of Ninotchka (1939).

The film premiered in San Diego, California on December 22, 1932, and went into general American release on January 5, 1933.
