= Hullo Healo =

1920s Musical Comedy written by two Australian writers

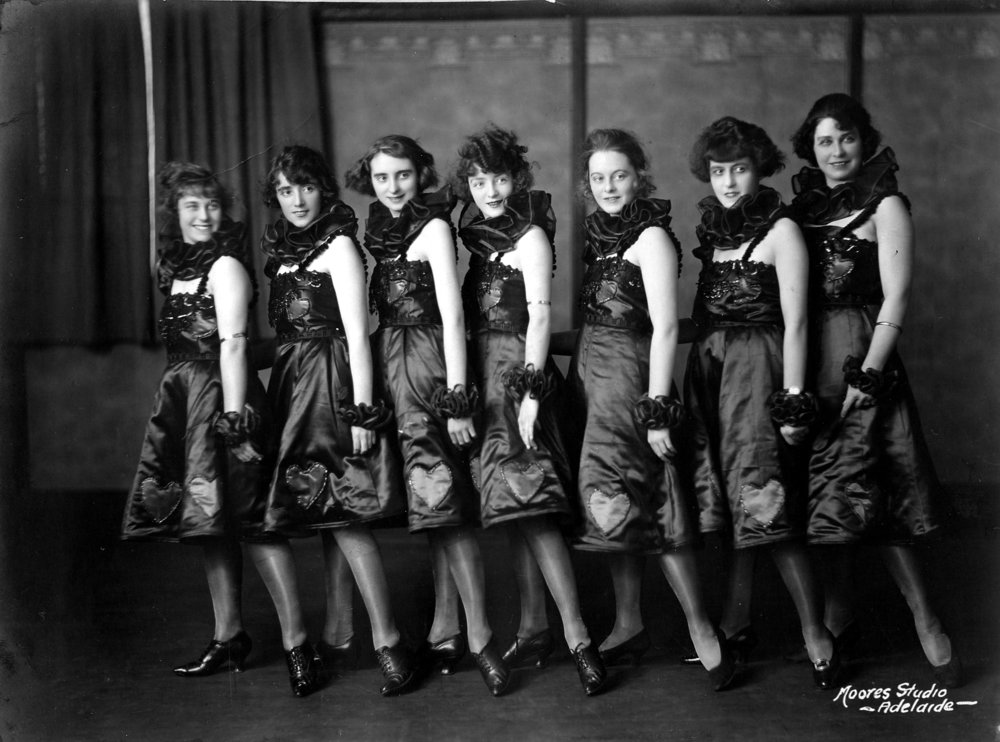
Adelaide cast members of Healo in 1924

Hullo Healo is a musical comedy by Australian actor and screenwriter Dion Titheradge and composer Kenneth Duffield. The plot revolves around Barnabas Burnaby, who hides on a yacht bound for the South Seas, after his company, Healo Limited, has its shares drop and its factory girls go on strike, and is later crowned king after being shipwrecked on the fictional island known as the Island of Bliss.

== History ==
In May 1924, the musical, originally titled Healo, had its premiere in Adelaide at Theatre Royal, with the cast being made up of friends of Duffield. The musical was produced professionally in Adelaide in 1926, under the name Hullo Healo, before moving to the Palace Theatre in Sydney in 1927.
