= Love in the Wilderness =

1920 film

- Directed by: Alexander Butler
- Based on: Love in the Wilderness by Gertrude Page
- Produced by: G.B. Samuelson
- Starring: Madge Titheradge; C. M. Hallard; Campbell Gullan; Maudie Dunham
- Production company: G.B. Samuelson Productions
- Distributed by: General Film Distributors
- Release date: May 1920
- Running time: 5,000 feet
- Country: United Kingdom
- Languages: Silent; English intertitles

Love in the Wilderness is a 1920 British silent drama film directed by Alexander Butler and starring Madge Titheradge, C. M. Hallard and Campbell Gullan. It was adapted from Gertrude Page's 1907 novel Love in the Wilderness. The film is a romantic melodrama, set partly on a farm in Southern Rhodesia. The film was shot in California.

== Cast ==
- Madge Titheradge as Enid Davenport
- C. M. Hallard as Keith Meredith
- Campbell Gullan as Hon. Dicky Byrd
- Maudie Dunham as Nancy Johnson
- Hubert Davies as George Whiting
- Frances Griffiths as Marion Davenport
- Lenore Lynard as Mrs. Meredith

== Preservation ==
With no holdings located in archives, Love in the Wilderness is considered a lost film.

== Bibliography ==
- Bamford, Kenton. Distorted Images: British National Identity and Film in the 1920s. I.B. Tauris, 1999.
- Low, Rachael. History of the British Film, 1918-1929. George Allen & Unwin, 1971.
