= Edge O' Beyond =

1919 silent film

- Directed by: Fred W. Durrant
- Written by: Irene Miller
- Based on: The Edge O' Beyond by Gertrude Page
- Produced by: G.B. Samuelson
- Starring: Ruby Miller; Owen Nares; Isobel Elsom
- Production company: G.B. Samuelson Productions
- Distributed by: General Film Distributors
- Release date: October 1919
- Country: United Kingdom
- Languages: Silent; English intertitles

Edge O' Beyond is a 1919 British silent drama film directed by Fred W. Durrant and starring Ruby Miller, Owen Nares and Isobel Elsom. It is an adaptation of the 1908 novel The Edge O' Beyond by Gertrude Page, one of her bestsellers set in Rhodesia. It was shot at the Isleworth Studios in West London. Ruby Miller had previously appeared in a West End stage version of the novel.

== Cast ==
- Ruby Miller as Dinah Webberley
- Owen Nares as Dr. Cecil Lawson
- Isobel Elsom as Joyce Grey
- C. M. Hallard as Captain Burnett
- Minna Grey as Dulcie Maitland
- Fred Raynham as Oswald Grant
- James Lindsay as Major Egerton

== Bibliography ==
- Bamford, Kenton. Distorted images: British national identity and film in the 1920s. I.B. Tauris, 1999.
- Free, Melissa. Beyond Gold and Diamonds: Genre, the Authorial Informant, and the British South African Novel. SUNY Press, 2021.
- Low, Rachael. The History of the British Film 1918-1929. George Allen & Unwin, 1971.
