= Malcolm Cherry =

English actor (1878–1925)

Cherry with Gladys Cooper in Wanted, a Husband, 1917

Malcolm Cherry (17 May 1878 – 13 April 1925) was an English actor.

== Life and career ==
Malcolm Gibson Cherry was born in Liverpool on 17 May, 1878, the son of William Francis Cherry, a cotton broker, and his wife Emily, née Lees. (Note: After Cherry's death, several newspaper obituaries, confusing him with the actor Charles Cherry, stated that Malcolm Cherry was the son of James Frederick Cherry and his wife, Lady Emily Cherry. Lady Emily, who was Charles Cherry's mother, wrote to the press to correct this error. The same mistake was made by Who's Who in the Theatre.)

Cherry made his first appearance on the stage at the Queen's Theatre, Manchester, 1897, as Mardian in Antony and Cleopatra with Louis Calvert, subsequently playing in Hamlet, and other Shakespeare plays at the same theatre. In 1900 he toured with Julia Neilson in As You Like It. His West End debut was in Sweet Nell of Old Drury at the Haymarket Theatre in August 1900, and played intermittently in Neilson and Fred Terry's company between then and 1912.

In September 1912 he went to the United States, and appeared in Chicago, as John Rhead in Milestones, subsequently touring in the same part. After returning to London he appeared mainly in modern plays, but played Cinna in the Shakespeare Tercentenary production of Julius Caesar with F. R. Benson in the title role, Arthur Bourchier as Brutus, H. B. Irving as Cassius and Henry Ainley as Mark Antony. In May 1919 he succeeded Charles Hawtrey in the leading male role in Frederick J. Jackson's comedy The Naughty Wife, co-starring with Gladys Cooper, and in August of that year, he, Hawtrey and Cooper played the three lead roles in W. Somerset Maugham's farce Home and Beauty at the Playhouse Theatre.

As a playwright, Cherry co-wrote Mr Jarvis, seen at Wyndham's Theatre in 1911 and Jack o' Jingles, seen at the New Theatre in 1919.

Cherry was twice married: first to Kathleen Doyle and secondly to the actress Una Vane. He died in London on 13 April 1925.

== Selected filmography ==
- Far from the Madding Crowd (1915)
- A Welsh Singer (1916)
- A Place in the Sun (1916)
- Grim Justice (1916)
- A Member of Tattersall's (1919)
- Linked by Fate (1919)
- The Call of Youth (1921)

== Notes, references and sources ==
=== Sources ===
- Mander, Raymond; Joe Mitchenson (1955). Theatrical Companion to Maugham. London: Rockliffe. OCLC 1336174067.\
- Parker, John, ed. (1925). Who's Who in the Theatre (fifth ed.). London: Sir Isaac Pitman and Sons. OCLC 10013159.
