= The Husband Hunter (British film) =

1920 film

- Directed by: Fred W. Durrant
- Written by: Olivia Roy (novel)
- Produced by: G.B. Samuelson
- Starring: C. M. Hallard; Madge Titheradge; Tom Reynolds
- Production company: G.B. Samuelson Productions
- Distributed by: Granger
- Release date: January 1920
- Country: United Kingdom
- Languages: Silent; English intertitles

The Husband Hunter is a 1920 British silent drama comedy film directed by Fred W. Durrant and starring C.M. Hallard, Madge Titheradge and Tom Reynolds. It was shot at Isleworth Studios.

== Cast ==
- C. M. Hallard as Sir Robert Chester
- Madge Titheradge as Lalage Penrose
- Tom Reynolds as James Ogilvy
- Minna Grey as Joanna Marsh
- Reginald Dane as Lord Bayard

== Bibliography ==
- Bamford, Kenton. Distorted Images: British National Identity and Film in the 1920s. I.B. Tauris, 1999.
- Harris, Ed. Britain's Forgotten Film Factory: The Story of Isleworth Studios. Amberley Publishing, 2012.
- Low, Rachael. The History of the British Film 1918-1929. George Allen & Unwin, 1971.
