= Aunt Rachel =

1920 British film by Albert Ward

- Directed by: Albert Ward
- Written by: David Christie Murray (novel); Roland Pertwee
- Starring: Isobel Elsom; Haidee Wright; James Lindsay; Lionelle Howard
- Production company: G.B. Samuelson Productions
- Distributed by: Granger Films
- Release date: July 1920
- Running time: 5,500 feet
- Country: United Kingdom
- Languages: Silent; English intertitles

Aunt Rachel is a 1920 British silent drama film directed by Albert Ward and starring Isobel Elsom, Haidee Wright and James Lindsay. The standard of the film's intertitles was criticised.

== Cast ==
- Isobel Elsom as Ruth
- Haidee Wright as Aunt Rachel
- James Lindsay as Ferdinand de Blacquaire
- Lionelle Howard as Reuben
- Tom Reynolds as Eld
- Dalton Somers as Fuller
- Leonard Pagden as Ezra Gold
- Herbert Willis as Earl
- Dan Godfrey as Isiah

== Bibliography ==
- Bamford, Kentom. Distorted Images: British National Identity and Film in the 1920s. I.B. Tauris, 1999.
- Low, Rachael. History of the British Film, 1918–1929. George Allen & Unwin, 1971.
