= Paddy the Next Best Thing (1923 film) =

1923 film

- Directed by: Graham Cutts
- Written by: Wilfred Noy; Herbert Wilcox; Eliot Stannard
- Based on: Paddy the Next Best Thing by Gertrude Page
- Produced by: Herbert Wilcox
- Starring: Mae Marsh; Darby Foster; Lilian Douglas
- Cinematography: René Guissart
- Production company: Graham-Wilcox Productions
- Distributed by: Graham-Wilcox Productions (UK); United Artists (US)
- Release dates: January 1923 (UK); 2 June 1923 (US)
- Running time: 7,200 feet
- Country: United Kingdom
- Language: Silent (English intertitles)

Paddy the Next Best Thing is a 1923 British silent romance film directed by Graham Cutts and starring Mae Marsh, Darby Foster and Lilian Douglas. It was based on the 1908 novel of the same title by Gertrude Page and a 1920 stage adaptation, which was later adapted into a 1933 American film. It was made at the Gainsborough Studios in Islington. American star Mae Marsh had been brought over from Hollywood to star in the company's previous film Flames of Passion and stayed on to make this film.

It is believed to be a lost film.

== Cast ==
- Mae Marsh as Paddy
- Darby Foster as Lawrence Blake
- Lilian Douglas as Eileen Adair
- George K. Arthur as Playboy
- Nina Boucicault as Mrs. Blake
- Haidee Wright as Jane O'Hara
- Marie Wright as Mary O'Hara
- Marie Ault as Mrs. Adair
- Simeon Stuart as General Adair
- Mildred Evelyn as Doreen Blake
- Tom Coventry as Mickey Dolan

== See also ==
- List of lost films

== Bibliography ==
- Low, Rachael. History of the British Film, 1918-1929. George Allen & Unwin, 1971.
