= David and Jonathan (film) =

1920 British film by Alexander Butler

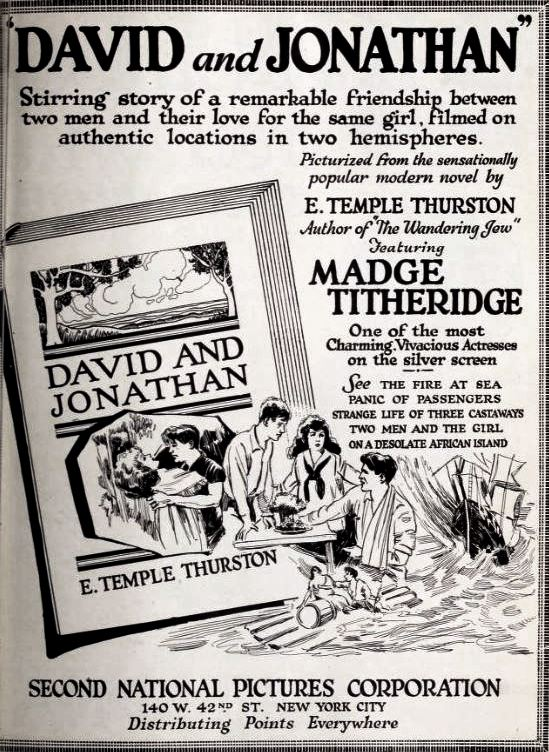
- American advertisement
- Directed by: Alexander Butler
- Based on: David & Jonathan by E. Temple Thurston
- Produced by: G.B. Samuelson
- Starring: Madge Titheradge; Geoffrey Webb; Dick Ryan
- Production company: G.B. Samuelson Productions
- Distributed by: General Film Distributors
- Release date: July 1920 (U.K.)
- Running time: 6 reels
- Country: United Kingdom
- Language: Silent (English intertitles)

David and Jonathan is a 1920 British silent adventure film directed by Alexander Butler and starring Madge Titheradge, Geoffrey Webb, and Dick Ryan. It was based on a novel by E. Temple Thurston. It was made at Universal City in California. Two men, David and Jonathan, are shipwrecked on a desert island together with a girl with whom they are both in love.

== Cast ==
- Madge Titheradge as Joan Meredith
- Geoffrey Webb as David Mortlake
- Richard Ryan as Jonathan Hawksley
- Sydney Wood as David, as a child
- Jack Perks as David as a child

== Bibliography ==
- Low, Rachael. History of the British Film, 1918-1929. George Allen & Unwin, 1971.
