= To-morrow We Live (1936 film) =

- Haidee Wright and Godfrey Tearle in the film
- Directed by: H. Manning Haynes
- Written by: H. Manning Haynes
- Produced by: Clayton Hutton
- Starring: Godfrey Tearle; Haidee Wright; Renee Gadd
- Cinematography: Walter Blakeley; Otto Heller
- Music by: Ernest Irving
- Production company: Conquest Films
- Distributed by: Associated British Film Distributors
- Release date: 7 October 1936
- Running time: 72 minutes
- Country: United Kingdom
- Language: English

To-morrow We Live (also known as Tomorrow We Live) is a 1936 British drama film directed and written by H. Manning Haynes and starring Godfrey Tearle, Haidee Wright and Renee Gadd. It was made as a quota quickie at Elstree Studios.

A desperate and suicidal man starts a scheme to help people in similar positions.

== Plot ==
Financier Sir Charles Hendra, who is on the brink of ruin, reflects on his life's failings and considers ending it all. He advertises for twelve men and women who are similarly at their wits' end and are contemplating suicide, and gathers the applicants for a dinner. He gives each person a £50 note and challenges them to do whatever they need to do, to get their lives back on track.

== Cast ==
- Godfrey Tearle as Sir Charles Hendra
- Haidee Wright as Mrs. Gill
- Renee Gadd as Patricia Gordon
- Sebastian Shaw as Eric Morton
- Eliot Makeham as Henry Blossom
- Thea Holme as Mary Leighton
- George Carney as Mr. Taylor
- Rosalind Atkinson as Mrs. Taylor
- Jessica Black as Mrs. Carter
- Fred Withers as Mr. Carter
- Cyril Raymond as George Warner

== Reception ==
Kine Weekly wrote: "It says something for the appealing character of the plot that it gets over very well, in spite of a camera-conscious attitude by some of the performers."

The Daily Film Renter wrote: "Only fair quota of humour and suspense; major portrayals adequate; average technical qualities and settings. Fair popular entertainment."

Picture Show wrote: "It is well treated, and has some genuine humour, but apart from the two leading characters, the players convey an atmosphere of artificiality."
