= A Member of Tattersall's =

1919 film

A Member of Tattersall's is a 1919 British silent sports film directed by Albert Ward and starring Isobel Elsom, Malcolm Cherry and Campbell Gullan. It was based on a play by H.V. Browning.

== Cast ==
- Isobel Elsom - Mary Wilmott
- Malcolm Cherry - Captain Brookes Greville
- Campbell Gullan - Foxey
- Tom Reynolds - Peter Perks
- James Lindsay - Lord Winthrop
