= Mrs. Thompson =

1919 film

Mrs. Thompson is a 1919 British silent drama film directed by Rex Wilson and starring Minna Grey, C. M. Hallard and Isobel Elsom. It was released in the United States on 6 April 1923. It was adapted from a 1911 novel by William Babington Maxwell.

== Cast ==
- Minna Grey - Mrs. Thompson
- C. M. Hallard - Prentice
- Isobel Elsom - Enid Thompson
- Bertram Burleigh - Dicky Marsden
- Tom Reynolds - Archibald Bence
- James Lindsay - Charles Kennion
- Marie Wright - Yates
- Wyndham Guise - Mears
