= A Light Woman (1928 film) =

1928 film directed by Adrian Brunel

- Directed by: Adrian Brunel
- Written by: Adrian Brunel; Angus MacPhail
- Produced by: Michael Balcon
- Starring: Benita Hume; C. M. Hallard; Gerald Ames; Betty Carter
- Production company: Gainsborough Pictures
- Distributed by: Woolf & Freedman Film Service
- Release date: 6 December 1928
- Running time: 100 minutes
- Country: United Kingdom
- Language: English
- Budget: £17,000

A Light Woman is a 1928 British silent romance film directed by Adrian Brunel and starring Benita Hume, C. M. Hallard and Gerald Ames. It is also known by the alternative title Dolores. The screenplay concerns a flighty young woman who learns the error of her ways through a series of love affairs.

== Cast ==
- Benita Hume as Dolores de Vargas
- C. M. Hallard as Marquis de Vargas
- Gerald Ames as Don Andrea
- Betty Carter as Pauline
- Donald Macardle as Ramiro
- Lillian Christine as Isabel
- Kitty Austin as La Frasquita
- Dennis Ray as Enrique
- Sidney Baron as Jose
- Beaufoy Milton as Arturo

== Bibliography ==
- Low, Rachael. History of the British Film, 1918-1929. George Allen & Unwin, 1971.
