= Silk Stockings (1927 film) =

1927 film

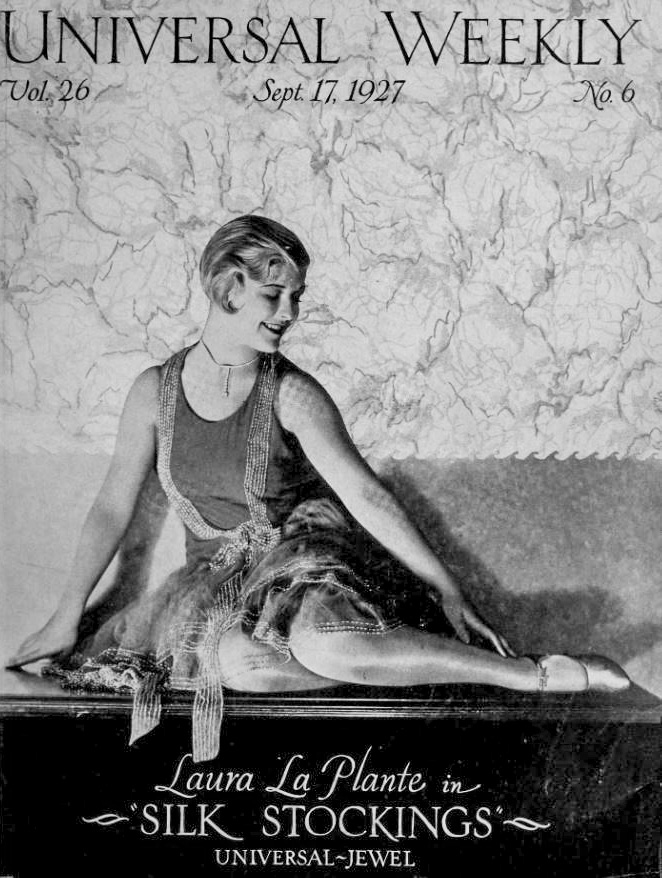
- 1927 magazine cover
- Directed by: Wesley Ruggles
- Screenplay by: Beatrice Van; Albert DeMond
- Based on: A Pair of Silk Stockings; 1914 play by Cyril Harcourt
- Produced by: Carl Laemmle (Pres)
- Starring: Laura La Plante; John Harron; Otis Harlan; William Austin; Marcella Daly; Heinie Conklin
- Cinematography: Ben F. Reynolds
- Production company: Universal Pictures
- Distributed by: Universal Pictures
- Release date: October 2, 1927
- Running time: 70 minutes
- Country: United States
- Language: Silent (English intertitles)

Silk Stockings is a 1927 American silent comedy film directed by Wesley Ruggles and written by Beatrice Van and Albert DeMond. It is based on the 1914 play A Pair of Silk Stockings by Cyril Harcourt. The film stars Laura La Plante, John Harron, Otis Harlan, William Austin, Marcella Daly, and Heinie Conklin. The film was released on October 2, 1927, by Universal Pictures.

== Plot ==
Happily married, Sam and Molly Thornhill are still a very much in love couple but one of their favorite pastimes is fighting. On the eve of their wedding anniversary, Sam is forced to stop over at the office to discuss business with some clients. Pressed by his haste to get home as soon as possible, he does not notice that a lady has slipped a silk stocking into his suit pocket which, upon his return, is immediately discovered by Molly. She and George Bagnall, a friend of the family, learn that in another similar case, it ended in divorce. Judge Moore, their mutual friend, thinks it well to teach the two quarrelsome spouses a lesson and suggests that Molly get a divorce. Reluctantly, she agrees to separate from her husband. While the two are at the seaside, visiting friends, the young wife is unable to hide her unhappiness. Moore then tells her that the divorce petition would be immediately rejected if she and her husband were found together in an awkward situation. She then rushes into what she believes to be her husband's room, but instead finds herself in front of George and his fiancée. The situation is resolved with the arrival of Sam who will take his beloved wife in his arms, thus offering her the excuse to retrace his steps.

== Cast ==
- Laura La Plante as Molly Thornhill
- John Harron as Sam Thornhill
- Otis Harlan as Judge Foster
- William Austin as George Bagnall
- Marcella Daly as Helen
- Heinie Conklin as Watchman
- Burr McIntosh as Judge
- Tempe Pigott as Mrs. Gower
- Ruth Cherrington as Dowager

== Preservation ==
A print of Silk Stockings is in the George Eastman Museum Motion Picture Collection.
