= Haidee Wright =

English actress (1867–1943)

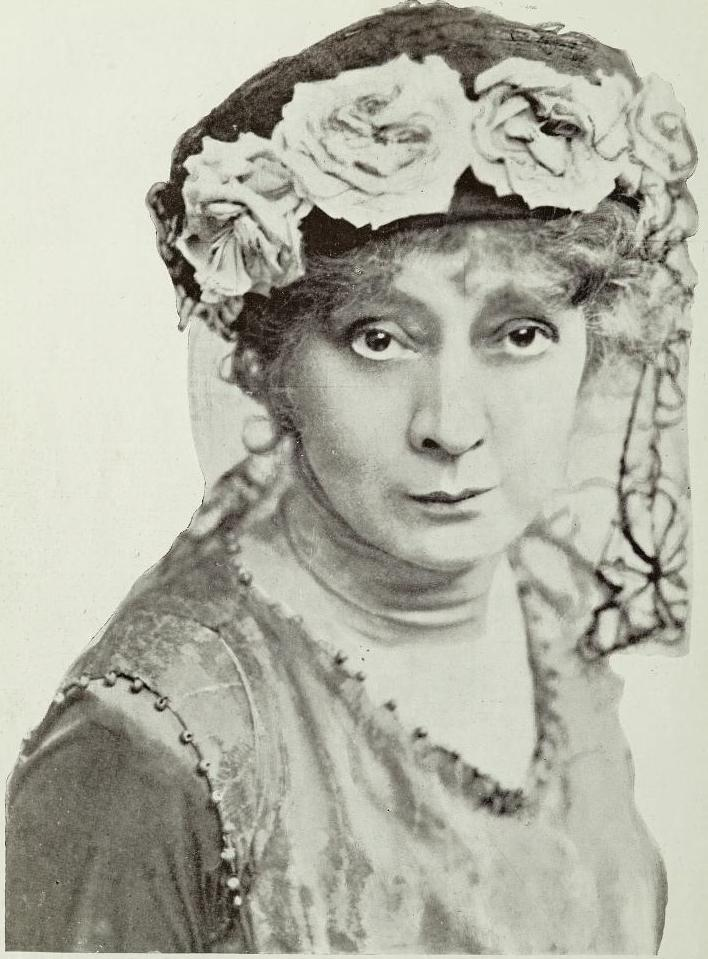
- Haidee Wright, from a 1921 publication.
- Born: Ada Wright; 13 January 1867; London, England
- Died: 29 January 1943 (aged 76); London, England
- Occupation: Actress
- Years active: 1878–1938
- Parent(s): Frederick Wright; Jessie (Francis) Wright
- Relatives: Huntley Wright (brother)

Haidee Wright (13 January 1867 – 29 January 1943), born as Ada Wright, was a London born English character actress. She began acting in plays in 1878 when a small child. She came from a family of actors and had a long career in the United Kingdom and the United States with much Broadway work with occasional parts in films. Her parents and many siblings were actors. One of her brothers was Huntley Wright.

== Selected plays ==
- The Passing of the Third Floor Back (1908)
- What Never Dies (1926)
- The Royal Family (1927)

== Partial filmography ==
- Evidence (1915)
- The Winning Goal (1920)
- Aunt Rachel (1920)
- Colonel Newcombe, the Perfect Gentleman (1920)
- Demos (1921)
- The Old Country (1921)
- The Glorious Adventure (1922)
- A Bachelor's Baby (1922)
- Paddy the Next Best Thing (1923)
- Strange Evidence (1933)
- The Blarney Stone (1933)
- Tomorrow We Live (1936)
