= Basil Thompson =

Basil Thompson (1937–2004) was a ballet dancer, master, and teacher.

He was trained by the Sadler's Wells Ballet School, now the Royal Ballet in London, and began his career with the Covent Garden Opera Ballet. He became a soloist with the American Ballet Theatre in New York City in 1960, was a ballet master with the Joffrey Ballet, then became a ballet master and artistic director of the Milwaukee Ballet from 1981 to 2000. During his early career in the USA he was married to Alaine Haubert and they had a son, Edward Thompson, in 1969.

He later married Kitty Carrol. They had two children, Audrey and Colin.

Thompson died November 2, 2004, in Lynchburg, Virginia, of sudden cardiac arrest. He was on sabbatical from teaching at the University of Iowa. He was 67.

"Basil brought joy, vigor and dedication to his work as a ballet master, teacher and coach," Gerald Arpino, founder and artistic director of the Joffrey Ballet, stated after Thompson's demise. "He knew the art of ballet thoroughly and lovingly shared it with all of us."
