= Home and Beauty =

1919 play by W. Somerset Maugham

Gladys Cooper as Victoria, 1919

Home and Beauty, known in the US as Too Many Husbands, is a farce in three acts by W. Somerset Maugham. Written in 1919, it was first seen in August of that year at the Globe Theatre, Atlantic City, and subsequently at the Booth Theatre, New York, under its American title. The British premiere was in August 1919 at the Playhouse Theatre in London.

The play depicts a young woman who has remarried after her first husband was missing, presumed dead, in the First World War. When the first husband turns out to be alive she has to resolve the problem, and in the end she decides to divorce both husbands and marry a rich suitor, to the relief of her first and second husbands. Home and Beauty has been revived several times, and adapted for radio, television and the cinema and as a film musical.

== Background and premieres ==
The novelist and playwright W. Somerset Maugham had his first great theatrical success in 1907 with a comedy, Lady Frederick, and by the following year he had four plays running simultaneously in the West End. His comedy Caroline (1916) kept his name before the public during the First World War, and in 1918, while hospitalised for three months with tuberculosis, he wrote a farce. It was first presented by A. H. Woods at the Globe Theatre, Atlantic City, under the title of Too Many Husbands on 4 August 1919, and then at the Booth Theatre, New York, on 8 October 1919 (102 performances). The West End production was presented by Frank Curzon and Gladys Cooper at the Playhouse Theatre, London, under the title of Home and Beauty, on 30 August 1919 (235 performances).

=== Original casts ===
London production, 1919, with from left, Lottie Venne, Charles Hawtrey, Malcolm Cherry, Gladys Cooper

Role	Atlantic City and New York	London
Victoria (a dear little thing)	Estelle Winwood	Gladys Cooper
Miss Dennis (a manicurist)	Beatrice Miller	Laura Lydia
Taylor (a parlourmaid)	Carolyn Darling	Doris Cooper
Mrs Shuttleworth (a mother-in-law)	Marguerite St John	Lottie Venne
Leicester Paton (a wangler)	Fritz Williams	Hubert Harben
Major Lowndes, DSO (Frederick) (a hero)	Ernest Lawford (Atlantic City); Lawrence Grossmith (New York)	Malcolm Cherry
Major Cardew, DSO (William) (another hero)	Kenneth Douglas	Charles Hawtrey
Nannie (a nurse)	Marion Buckler	Katherine Somervell
A. B. Raham (a solicitor)	J. H. Brewer	Lyston Lyle
Miss Montmorency (a maiden lady)	Florence Edney	Jean Cadell
Clarence (a boy)	Richard Gray	Alfred Ayre

Source: Theatrical Companion to Maugham.

== Plot ==
A year after Major William Cardew was officially reported as missing, believed killed, at the First Battle of Ypres his widow married his best friend, Major Frederick Lowndes. The marriage has not been a great success as Victoria has turned out to be vain and selfish. A row between the couple ends with Frederick's revelation that William is alive and has telephoned him to announce his return to England after being released from a prisoner-of-war camp at the end of the war. He had been unable to write or give any indication that he was alive because the Germans stopped him doing so as punishment for striking a German officer.

When William arrives he works out the situation. It becomes clear that Victoria does not greatly want either husband – neither of whom is well-off enough to keep her in the high luxury to which she feels entitled. The two men reciprocate her feelings. Each man attempts to resign his claim on her, but the legal position is complicated.

Victoria wants to divorce both husbands, though her solicitor, A. B. Raham, points out that legally she is only married to William. Given Britain's highly restrictive divorce laws at the time, this will be a difficult undertaking. Raham explains that Victoria must write each husband a letter, begging him to come back to her and the husbands must furnish evidence of their supposed adultery. Raham introduces a professional co-respondent, Miss Montmorency. She is an elderly spinster of impeccable morals, who undertakes the work in order to support her invalid father. She agrees to spend a night with William in a hotel room to be "discovered", although they will in fact sit up and play cards all night. She declines to provide the same service for Frederick ("One gentleman is business, but two would be debauchery"), but offers the services of a friend – a clergyman's widow and highly respectable. She suggests that the two couples might have adjacent rooms and make a foursome at bridge, but Raham warns that this might savour of collusion and invalidate the claim of adultery.

Victoria leaves to have lunch with Leicester Paton, a rich admirer, whom she hopes to marry. William and Frederick settle down to lunch from a hamper from the Ritz Hotel that Paton has sent Victoria. Opening a bottle of champagne from the hamper they drink a toast to "Victoria's third husband – God help him – and for us, liberty".

== Revivals ==
A revival at the Playhouse in 1942, directed by Val Gielgud with Isabel Jeans, Barry Jones and Ronald Squire, as Victoria and her two husbands ran for only 12 performances. Eight years later a revival under Roy Rich, with Brenda Bruce, Anthony Marlowe and Hugh Burden in the three central roles was staged at the Arts Theatre in August 1950, transferring to two other West End theatres and running for a total of 202 performances.

The National Theatre staged a new production by Frank Dunlop in 1968–69, with Geraldine McEwan as Victoria, Robert Stephens and Robert Lang as Frederick and William, and Arthur Lowe as A. B. Raham. Later in the run Benjamin Whitrow took over the role of Frederick, and Lowe was succeeded first by Bernard Bresslaw and then by Laurence Olivier.

A production by Christopher Luscombe at the Lyric Theatre, London, featured Victoria Hamilton as Victoria and Alexander Armstrong and Jamie Theakston as her two husbands. It ran from October 2002 until January 2003.

== Critical reception ==
From the outset, the play has divided critical opinion. In The New York Times, Alexander Woollcott called it "a new and delightful farce ... an evening of unalloyed amusement", although he doubted if its very English wit would appeal to every member of an American audience. The West End production was enthusiastically reviewed in The Times: "One is tempted to call Mr Maugham’s farce exquisite. It has style, wit, elegance, and at the same time the sheer fun that all farce should have, but fun of the choicest sort, quiet fun. It is a little masterpiece of polite merriment". By contrast The Stage found the play distasteful, contrasting what it saw as the author's cynicism and apparent lack of sincerity with his effective theatrical craftsmanship: "Amusing, superficially, as all this may be, the taste of it seems to be doubtful". The Tatler found the play "screamingly funny".

By the time of the 1942 revival, The Stage was more kindly disposed to the piece: "Home and Beauty is a model of discretion in handling a delicate theme and of ingenuity in construction, while much of the dialogue has the quiet distinction and wit that one expects from its author". When the National Theatre revived the play in 1968 The Stage found it "diverting, witty, amusing, all the things of that sort Maugham meant it to be", but now the paper was troubled by what it saw as the author's misogyny: "Maugham's dislike of women has an acrid flavour". This also troubled Michael Billington, reviewing the 2002 revival in The Guardian: "Although Somerset Maugham dubbed his 1919 play 'a farce' it is actually a misogynist comedy dipped in vitriol". The Stage now found the play "enormous fun especially when Maugham gives the set-up a delightful comic spin – neither husband wants to draw the short straw of being married to Victoria".

== Adaptations ==
The play has been adapted for television, radio and the cinema, and has been turned into a musical. BBC Television has broadcast two versions of the play. The first, in 1948, featured Helen Cherry as Victoria and Desmond Walter-Ellis and Fred Kitchen Jr as her husbands. A 1952 production had Barbara Murray, Barry K. Barnes and Geoffrey Sumner in the main roles. A BBC Radio production in 1966 featured the Marlowe Company, Canterbury.

A much altered version of the play was filmed in the US under the title of Too Many Husbands in 1940. The film was shown in Britain with the title My Two Husbands, as there had already been a British film in 1938 using the original title. The story was rewritten by Claude Binyon and little remained from Maugham's play but the basic premise of the plot. In 1955 Columbia Pictures presented Three for the Show, a musical version of the play with an original score by George Dunning and music repurposed from the works of classical composers.

== Sources ==
- Mander, Raymond; Joe Mitchenson (1955). Theatrical Companion to Maugham. London: Rockliffe. OCLC 1336174067.
- Maugham, W. Somerset (1923). Home and Beauty. London: Heinemann.
