= In the Night (film) =

1922 film

- Directed by: Frank Richardson
- Written by: Cyril Harcourt; Frank Powell
- Release date: 7 July 1922
- Countries: United Kingdom; Netherlands
- Language: Silent

In the Night (Dutch: in de nacht) is a 1922 British-Dutch silent crime film directed by Frank Richardson.

== Cast ==
- C. M. Hallard - The Stranger
- Dorothy Fane - Estelle
- Hayford Hobbs - George Stanton
- Adelqui Migliar - James Marston
- Gladys Jennings - Anne Marston
- Frank Dane - Inspector
