= Paddy the Next Best Thing (1933 film) =

1933 film by Harry Lachman

- Directed by: Harry Lachman
- Written by: Edwin J. Burke
- Based on: Paddy the Next Best Thing by Gertrude Page
- Produced by: Winfield R. Sheehan
- Starring: Janet Gaynor; Warner Baxter; Walter Connolly
- Cinematography: John F. Seitz
- Edited by: Margaret Clancey
- Music by: Louis De Francesco
- Production company: Fox Film Corporation
- Distributed by: Fox Film Corporation
- Release date: September 1, 1933
- Running time: 75 minutes
- Country: United States
- Language: English

Paddy the Next Best Thing is a 1933 American pre-Code romantic comedy film directed by Harry Lachman and starring Janet Gaynor, Warner Baxter and Walter Connolly. The screenplay was written by Edwin J. Burke, based on the 1912 novel Paddy the Next Best Thing by Gertrude Page and its later stage adaptation, which had previously been made into a 1923 British silent film of the same title. The film reteamed Gaynor and Baxter who had starred together in the 1931 hit Daddy Long Legs.

== Plot ==
Impoverished Irish landowner Major Adair pushes his eldest daughter Eileen to marry the wealthy Lawrence Blake in order to pay off his debts, despite the fact that she is in love with another man. However Adair's younger daughter Paddy falls for Blake herself, and schemes to order events to everybody's happiness.

== Cast ==
- Janet Gaynor as Paddy Adair
- Warner Baxter as Lawrence Blake
- Walter Connolly as Major Adair
- Harvey Stephens as Jack Breen
- Margaret Lindsay as Eileen Adair
- J. M. Kerrigan as Collins
- Fiske O'Hara as Doctor David Adair
- Merle Tottenham as Maid
- Roger Imhof as Micky
- Mary McCormic as herself (scenes deleted)

== Reception ==
The film was one of Fox's biggest hits of the year.
