= A Temporary Gentleman =

1920 film

- Directed by: Fred W. Durrant
- Written by: H.F. Maltby (play)
- Produced by: G.B. Samuelson
- Starring: Owen Nares; Madge Titheradge; Alfred Drayton
- Production company: G.B. Samuelson Productions
- Distributed by: Greanger Films
- Release date: June 1920
- Country: United Kingdom
- Languages: Silent; English intertitles

A Temporary Gentleman is a 1920 British silent comedy film directed by Fred W. Durrant and starring Owen Nares, Madge Titheradge and Alfred Drayton. It was shot at Isleworth Studios.

== Plot ==
A clerk's service as subaltern spoils him for menial work.

== Cast ==
- Owen Nares as Walter Hope
- Madge Titheradge as Miss Hudson
- Tom Reynolds as Mr. Jack
- Maudie Dunham as Alice Hope
- Sydney Fairbrother as Mrs. Hope
- Alfred Drayton as Sir Herbert Hudson

== Bibliography ==
- Harris, Ed. Britain's Forgotten Film Factory: The Story of Isleworth Studios. Amberley Publishing, 2012.
