= Fiske O'Hara =

American actor

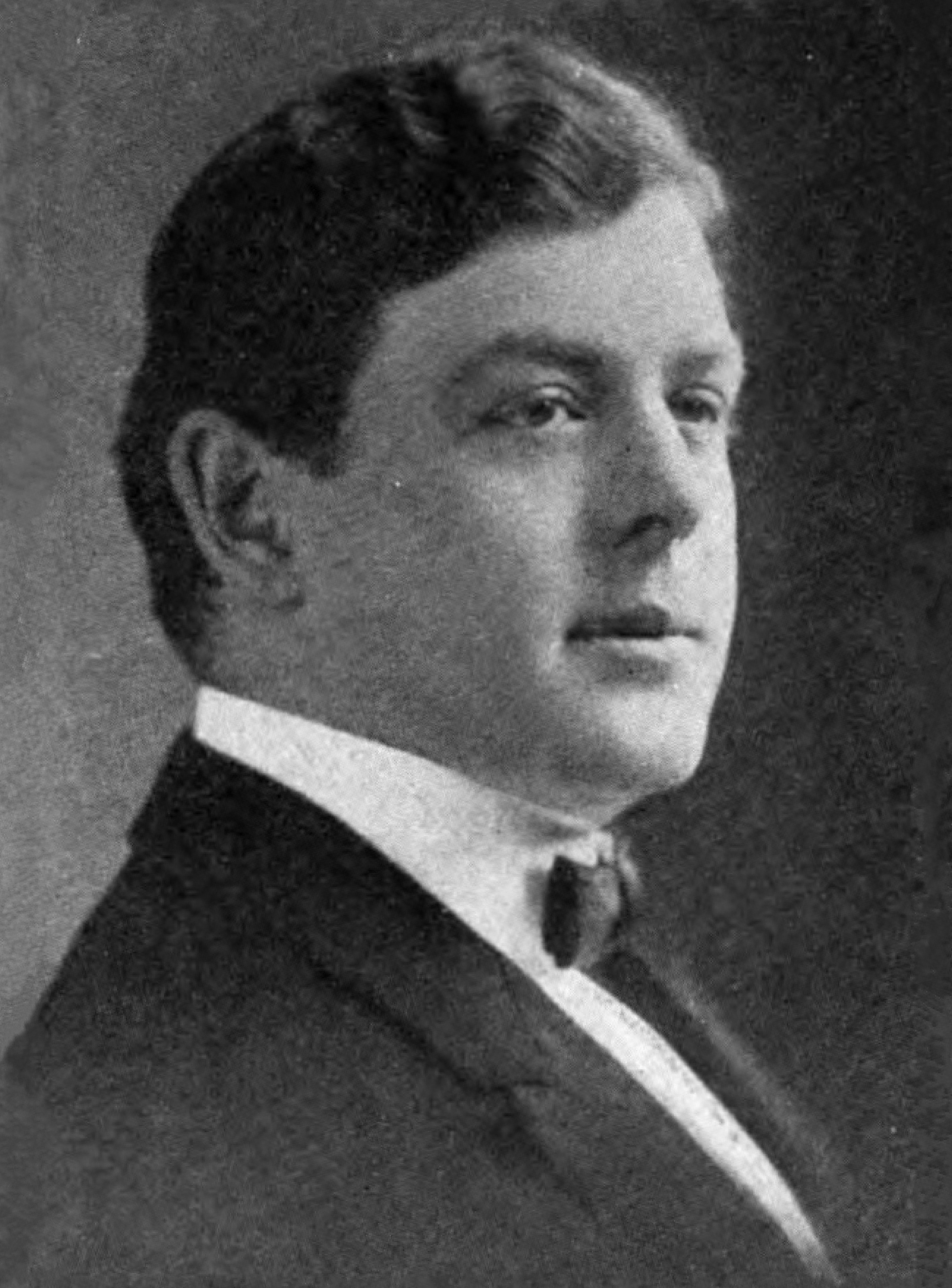
- Born: George Russ Clary Fiske O'Hara; March 11, 1878; Rockland, Maine, U.S.
- Died: July 12, 1945 (aged 67); Hollywood, California, U.S.
- Resting place: Kensico Cemetery, Valhalla, New York, U.S.
- Occupation(s): Singer and actor
- Spouse: Marie Patricia O'Hara

George Russ Clary Fiske O'Hara (March 11, 1878, Rockland, Maine – July 12, 1945, Hollywood, California) was an American singer and actor who was nicknamed the Irish Tenor.

== Early career, 1898-1909 ==
He made his professional debut in 1898 under the name George Fiske with Mr. and Mrs. Charles Manley in the rural comedy Down on the Farm. The following year he supported Tony Farrell in My Colleen, and then came a season divided between McFee's Matrimonial Bureau and as principal tenor with Gus Sun's Minstrels. Beginning with the season of 1901-02 and for two years, O'Hara managed and played important parts with the People's Theatre Stock Company, Chicago, IL., and during the summer of 1903 he filled a special engagement with the Ferris Stock, St. Paul, Minn., being cast for such important juvenile roles as Albert in Monte Cristo, Judson Langhorne in All the Comforts of Home, Dechelette in Sapho. Tom Mayne in My Jim and Sir Reginald Dare in Shamus O'Brien, in which his singing of My Wild Irish Rose met with most hearty approval. O'Hara divided the season of 1903-04 between the Metropolitan Stock, Duluth, Minn., with which organization he played two roles each week, gaining an invaluable amount of experience, and with The Bostonians, singing tenor roles with this company in Robin Hood, The Serenade and The Queen of Laughter. It was following this that he made his debut before a New York audience, at the Majestic Theatre, August 23, 1904, as Lieutenant Harold Katchall in The Isle of Spice, meeting with most hearty approval. O'Hara made his first appearance at the head of his own company Christmas Day, 1905 at Newark, N. J., in Mr. Blarney from Ireland, a piece written specially for him and in which he introduced several songs of his own composition. He devoted two seasons to this piece and then came a year and a half in an equally popular successor, Dion O'Dare.

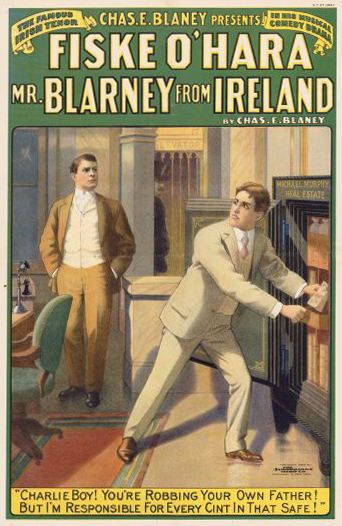
Color lithograph poster for Mr. Blarney from Ireland starring Fiske O'Hara, 1906.

In 1909, O'Hara toured the vaudeville circuit, presenting an Irish sketch, Captain Barry.

== Filmography ==
O'Hara also appeared in several films, including:

- Paddy the Next Best Thing (1933)
- Change of Heart (1934)
- The Girl from Missouri (1934)
- Death Flies East (1935)

== Death ==
Having been blind for a year and a half and confined to bed for a year, Fiske O'Hara died on August 2, 1945. The funeral services were conducted at the Elks Lodge No. 99, his remains cremated before being sent to Valhalla, NY for interment.
