= The Pathway (novel) =

1912 novel by Gertrude Page

- First edition
- Author: Gertrude Page
- Language: English
- Genre: Drama
- Publisher: Ward, Lock & Co.
- Publication date: 1914
- Publication place: United Kingdom
- Media type: Print

The Pathway is a 1914 novel by the British writer Gertrude Page. It was part of her series of bestselling novels set in Rhodesia. It was translated into Norwegian. It continued to be widely read into the early 1930s, when Page's wider popularity began to wane.

It was written and set shortly before the outbreak of the First World War. One of the issues raised in the novel is the potential inclusion of Rhodesia into the Union of South Africa which is opposed one of the characters, a politician.

== Bibliography ==
- Free, Melissa. Beyond Gold and Diamonds: Genre, the Authorial Informant, and the British South African Novel. SUNY Press, 2021.
- James, Robert. Popular culture and working–class taste in Britain, 1930–39: A round of cheap diversions?. Manchester University Press, 2013.
