= C. M. Hallard =

Scottish actor (1865–1942)

- Born: Charles Maitland Hallard; 26 October 1865; Edinburgh
- Died: 21 April 1942 (aged 76); Farnham
- Occupation: Actor

Charles Maitland Hallard (26 October 1865 – 21 April 1942) was a Scottish actor. In 1895 he appeared in the popular drama Trilby with Herbert Beerbohm Tree at the Haymarket Theatre.

== Selected filmography ==
- Convict 99 (1919) - Ralph Vickers
- The Bridal Chair (1919) - Lord Louis Lewis
- Faith (1919) - Lord Louis Lewis
- Gamblers All (1919) - John Leighton
- Edge O' Beyond (1919) - Captain Burnett
- Mrs. Thompson (1919) - Prentice
- The Elder Miss Blossom (1919) - Andrew Quick
- Faith (1919) - Lord Louis Lewis
- The Husband Hunter (1920) - Sir Robert Chester
- Love in the Wilderness (1920) - Keith Meredith
- Her Story (1920) - Ashelyn
- The Case of Lady Camber (1920) - Sir Bedford Slufter
- The Pauper Millionaire (1922) - Pye Smith
- In the Night (1922) - The Stranger
- Carry On (1927) - John Peters
- A Light Woman (1928) - Marquis de Vargas
- Knowing Men (1930) - Marquis de Jarnais
- The W Plan (1930) - Commander-in-Chief
- Two Worlds (1930) - Col. von Zaminsky
- Almost a Honeymoon (1930) - Sir James Jephson
- Compromising Daphne (1930) - Mr. Ponsonby
- The Woman Between (1931) - Earl Bellingdon
- Tell England (1931) - The Colonel
- Strictly Business (1931) - Mr. Plummett
- The Rasp - Sir Arthur Digby-Coates
- The Chinese Puzzle (1932) - Sir Aylmer Brent
- On Secret Service (1933) - Colonel von Waldmuller
- Rolling in Money (1934) - Carter
- The Third Clue (1934) - Gabriel Wells
- The Riverside Murder (1935) - Dickenson - Norman's Attorney
- Royal Cavalcade (1935) - Winston Churchill
- Night Mail (1935) - Sir Jacob March
- Moscow Nights (1935) - President of Court Martial
- King of the Damned (1935) - Commandant Courvin
- Jack of All Trades (1936) - Henry Kilner
- The Live Wire (1937) - Sir George Dawson
- The Sky's the Limit (1938) - Lord Morgan (Last appearance)
