= Kenneth Duffield =

Australian theatrical composer, writer and pastoralist (1885–1958)

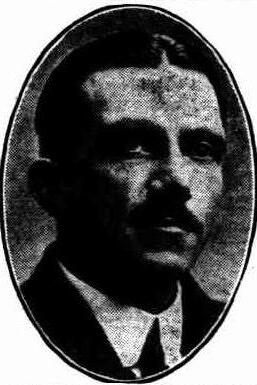
Duffield in 1927

Kenneth Launcelot Duffield (31 May 1885 – 23 November 1958) was an Australian theatrical composer, writer and pastoralist.

== Early life ==
Kenneth Duffield was born on 31 May 1885, to a wealthy South Australian pastoral family. His grandfather was colonial politician Walter Duffield. He was educated at St Peter's College in Adelaide. Moving to England, Duffield graduated in Arts from Cambridge in 1906 and a diploma in agriculture the following year. At Cambridge he was part of the Footlights Club.

== Career ==
As a young man in England, Duffield composed words for songs with lyrics including by A. A. Milne and P. G. Wodehouse, and had a number of songs published. He returned to work at the family station Koonoona in South Australia for eight years.

Soon before the outbreak of World War I, Duffield returned to England. He enlisted and rose to be a captain in the Royal Warwick Regiment. He was said to have "entertained troops on a battered 80 franc French piano, which was carried in a 30 franc cart".

Between 1920 and 1922, Duffield contributed music for West End revues including Puss! Puss! (Vaudeville Theatre, 1921), Pot Luck (Vaudeville Theatre, 1921), A to Z (Prince of Wales Theatre, 1921) and Snap (Vaudeville Theatre, 1922).

He again returned to South Australia in 1922 to manage Koonoona following the death of his father. His musical comedy Hullo Healo was first presented in Adelaide in 1924 (as Healo) and at the Palace Theatre in Sydney in 1927.

In the late 1920s, he returned to London where he contributed to further musical revues.

Duffield published an autobiography Savages and Kings in 1946, and retired to Adelaide in 1948.
