= Isobel Elsom =

British actress (1893–1981)

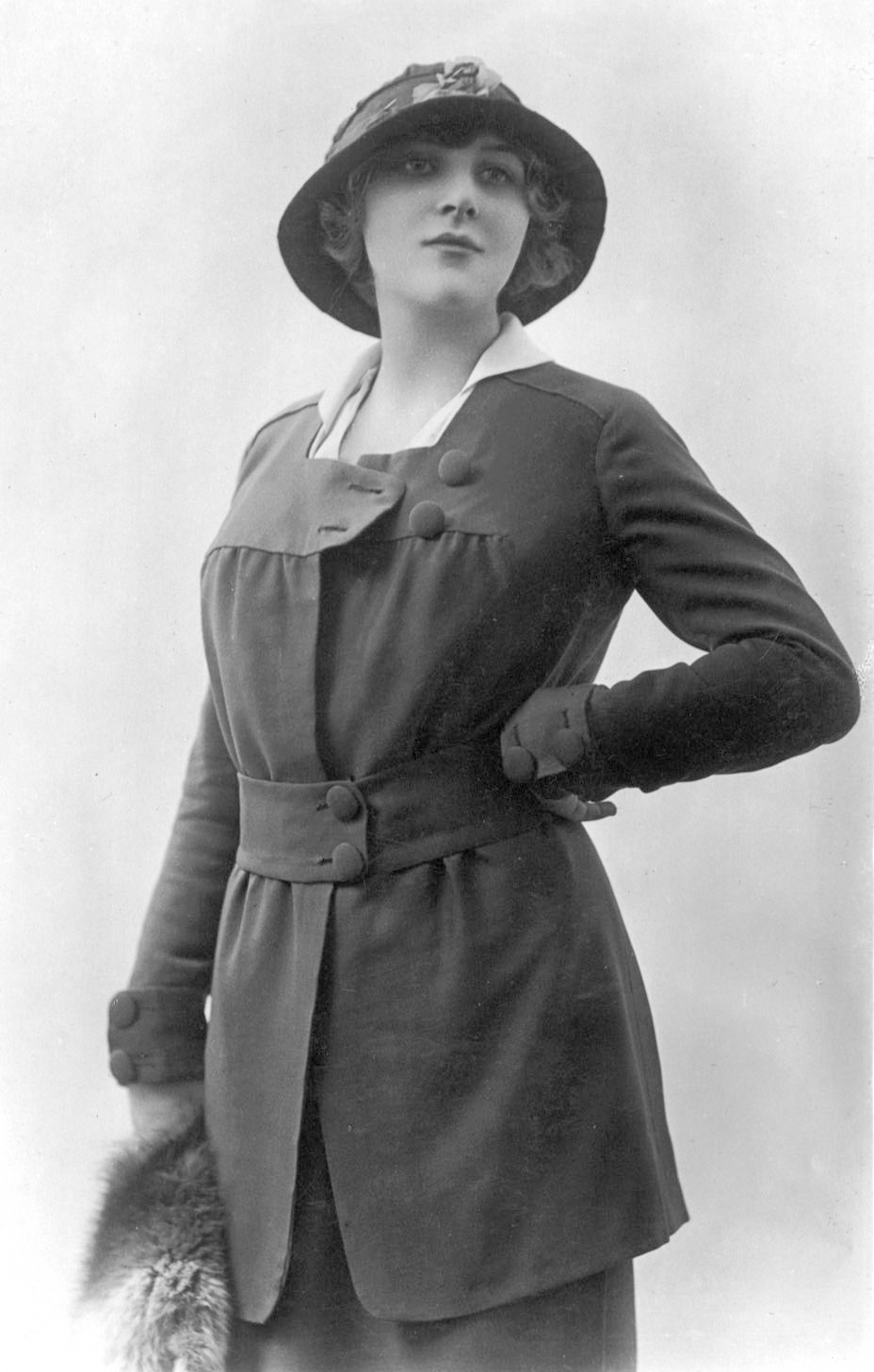
- Elsom photographed by Lallie Charles
- Born: Isabella Reed; 16 March 1893; Chesterton, Cambridge, Cambridgeshire, England
- Died: 12 January 1981 (aged 87); Woodland Hills, Los Angeles, California, U.S.
- Occupation: Actress
- Years active: 1911–1964
- Spouses: Maurice Elvey (m. 1923; div. 19??); Carl Harbord (m. 1942; died 1958)

Isobel Elsom (born Isabella Reed; 16 March 1893 – 12 January 1981) was an English film, theatre, and television actress. She was often cast as an aristocratic or upper-class woman.

== Early years ==
Elsom was born in Chesterton, Cambridge, England, and attended Howard College, Bedford.

== Career ==
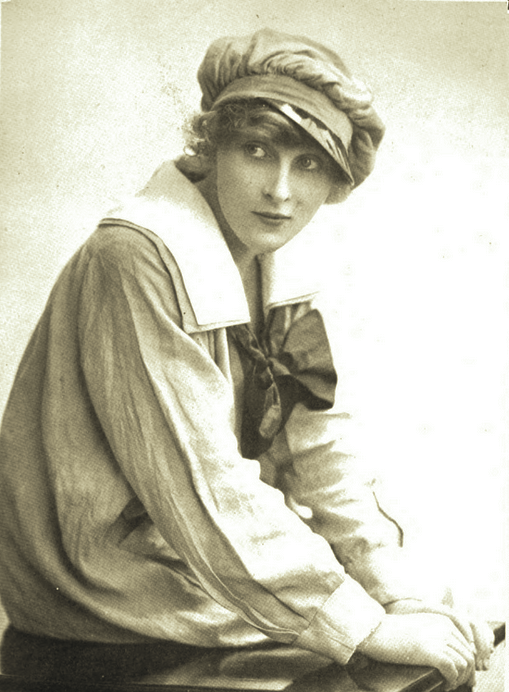
The Tatler, 1916

Elsom debuted on stage in London as a member of the chorus of The Quaker Girl (1911). Gilbert Miller promoted her to stardom in The Outsider.

Over the course of three decades, she appeared in 17 Broadway productions, beginning with The Ghost Train (1926). Her best-known stage role was the wealthy murder victim in Ladies in Retirement (1939), a role she repeated in the 1941 film version. Her other theatre credits included The Innocents and Romeo and Juliet. Elsom made her first screen appearance during the silent film era (she frequently co-starred with Owen Nares) and appeared in nearly 100 films throughout her career.

Elsom appeared as the leading lady for the Elitch Theatre summer season of 1928. At Elitch, she appeared in the role she created in the play The Outsider earlier that year on Broadway. A Denver reviewer of the play wrote:

If there is anybody in this man's town who doubts that Isobel Elsom, leading woman at the Elitch Gardens Theatre, is an actress of the highest rank, let that doubting Thomas see her work in The Outsider ... She not only is scoring a brilliant personal triumph, but is demonstrating to local playgoers exactly why she was one of the most popular actresses London ever knew!

She met her first husband, director Maurice Elvey, when he cast her in his 1919 film Quinneys. He directed her in eight more films before they divorced. Elsom's other screen credits included The White Cliffs of Dover (1944), The Unseen (1945), Of Human Bondage (1946), The Ghost and Mrs. Muir, Monsieur Verdoux, The Paradine Case, and The Two Mrs. Carrolls (all 1947), The Secret Garden (1949), Love Is a Many-Splendored Thing (1955), Lust for Life and 23 Paces to Baker Street (both 1956), and The Pleasure Seekers and My Fair Lady (both 1964).

She appeared opposite Jerry Lewis in four of his late 1950s/early 1960s films. Elsom's television credits included Armstrong Circle Theatre, Hallmark Hall of Fame, Lux Video Theatre, My Three Sons, Alfred Hitchcock Presents (at least five appearances), Playhouse 90, Hawaiian Eye, Straightaway, and Dr. Kildare.

== Personal life ==
Elsom's second husband was actor Carl Harbord, married from 1947 until his death in 1958. She had no children.

== Death ==
Elsom died of heart failure at the Motion Picture & Television Hospital in Woodland Hills, California, aged 87.

== National Portrait Gallery ==
Five portraits of Elsom are included in the Photographs Collection of the National Portrait Gallery in London.

== Partial filmography ==
- Milestones (1916) – Lady Monkhurst
- The Way of an Eagle (1918) – Mariel Roscoe
- Tinker, Tailor, Soldier, Sailor (1918) – Isobel Bunter
- God Bless Our Red, White and Blue (1918) – The Wife
- The Man Who Won (1918) – Milly Cooper
- Onward Christian Soldiers (1918) – The Girl
- Quinneys (1919) – Posy Quinney
- Linked by Fate (1919) – Nina Vernon
- Hope (1919) – Jenny Northcote
- Edge O' Beyond (1919) – Joyce Grey
- A Member of Tattersall's (1919) – Mary Wilmott
- The Elder Miss Blossom (1919) – Sophie Blossom
- Mrs. Thompson (1919) – Enid Thompson
- Nance (1920) – Nance Gray
- Aunt Rachel (1920) – Ruth
- For Her Father's Sake (1921) – Lilian Armitage
- The Game of Life (1922) – Alice Fletcher
- Dick Turpin's Ride to York (1922) – Esther Bevis
- A Debt of Honour (1922) – Hope Carteret
- The Harbour Lights (1923) – Dora Nelson
- The Wandering Jew (1923) – Olalla Quintane
- The Sign of Four (1923) – Mary Morstan
- The Love Story of Aliette Brunton (1924) – Aliette Brunton
- Who Is the Man? (1924) – Genevieve Arnault
- The Last Witness (1925) – Letitia Brand
- Le réveil (1925) – Thérèse de Mégèe
- Tragedy of a Marriage (1927) – Louise Radcliffe
- Dance Magic (1927) – Selma Bundy
- The Other Woman (1931) – Roxanne Paget
- Stranglehold (1931) – Beatrice
- The Crooked Lady (1932) – Miriam Sinclair
- Illegal (1932) – Mrs. Evelyn Dean
- The Thirteenth Candle (1933) – Lady Sylvia Meeton
- The Primrose Path (1934) – Brenda Dorland
- Eagle Squadron (1942) – Dame Elizabeth Whitby
- The War Against Mrs. Hadley (1942) – Mrs. Laura Winters
- Laugh Your Blues Away (1942) – Mrs. Westerly
- Seven Sweethearts (1942) – Miss Abagail Robbins
- You Were Never Lovelier (1942) – Mrs. Maria Castro
- Forever and a Day (1943) – Lady Trimble-Pomfret
- First Comes Courage (1943) – Rose Lindstrom
- My Kingdom for a Cook (1943) – Lucille Scott
- The White Cliffs of Dover (1944) – Mrs. Bancroft (uncredited)
- Between Two Worlds (1944) – Genevieve Cliveden-Banks
- Casanova Brown (1944) – Mrs. Ferris
- The Unseen (1945) – Marian Tygarth
- Two Sisters from Boston (1946) – Aunt Jennifer
- Of Human Bondage (1946) – Mrs. Betty Athelny
- The Two Mrs. Carrolls (1947) – Mrs. Latham
- Monsieur Verdoux (1947) – Marie Grosnay
- The Ghost and Mrs. Muir (1947) – Angelica Muir
- Ivy (1947) – Charlotte Chattle
- Escape Me Never (1947) – Mrs. MacLean
- Love from a Stranger (1947) – Auntie Loo-Loo
- The Paradine Case (1947) – Innkeeper
- Smart Woman (1948) – Mrs. Rogers
- Addio Mimí! (1949) – Madame Garzin
- The Secret Garden (1949) – Governess
- Désirée (1954) – Mme. Clary – Désirée's Mother
- Deep in My Heart (1954) – Mrs. Harris
- The King's Thief (1955) – Mrs. Bennett
- Love Is a Many-Splendored Thing (1955) – Adeline Palmer-Jones
- Alfred Hitchcock Presents (1956) (Season 1 Episode 23: "Back for Christmas") – Hermione Carpenter
- Over-Exposed (1956) – Mrs. Payton Grange
- 23 Paces to Baker Street (1956) – Lady Syrett
- Lust for Life (1956) – Mrs. Stricker
- Alfred Hitchcock Presents (1957) (Season 2 Episode 30: "The Three Dreams of Mr. Findlater") – Minnie Findlater
- Alfred Hitchcock Presents (1957) (Season 3 Episode 10: "The Diplomatic Corpse") – Mrs. Tait
- The Guns of Fort Petticoat (1957) – Mrs. Charlotte Ogden
- Rock-A-Bye Baby (1958) – Mrs. Van Cleeve
- The Young Philadelphians (1959) – Mrs. Dewitt Lawrence (uncredited)
- The Miracle (1959) – Mother Superior
- The Turn of the Screw (1959) – Mrs. Grose
- The Bellboy (1960) – Hotel Guest (uncredited)
- The Errand Boy (1961) – Irma Paramutual
- The Second Time Around (1961) – Mrs. Rogers
- The Alfred Hitchcock Hour (1962) (Season 1 Episode 6: "Final Vow") – Reverend Mother
- The Alfred Hitchcock Hour (1963) (Season 1 Episode 29: "The Dark Pool") – Sister Marie Therese
- Who's Minding the Store? (1963) – Hazel, a Dowager
- My Fair Lady (1964) – Mrs. Eynsford-Hill
- The Pleasure Seekers (1964) – Dona Teresa Lacayo
