= Linked by Fate (film) =

1919 film

- Directed by: Albert Ward
- Written by: Albert Ward
- Produced by: G. B. Samuelson
- Starring: Isobel Elsom; Malcolm Cherry; Bernard Vaughan; Esme Hubbard
- Production company: G.B. Samuelson Productions
- Distributed by: General Film Distributors
- Release date: August 1919
- Running time: 6 reels
- Country: United Kingdom
- Languages: Silent; English intertitles

Linked by Fate is a 1919 British silent drama film directed by Albert Ward and starring Isobel Elsom, Malcolm Cherry and Bernard Vaughan. It is an adaptation of the 1903 novel Linked by Fate by Charles Garvice.

== Cast ==
- Isobel Elsom as Nina Vernon
- Malcolm Cherry as Vane Mannering
- Bernard Vaughan as Dr. Vernon
- Esme Hubbard as Polly Bamford
- Clayton Green as Julian
- Manning Haynes as Lord Sutcombe
- Elaine Inescourt as Juliet Orme
- Barbara Gott as Deborah
- Ernest A. Douglas as Reverend Fleming

== Bibliography ==
- Low, Rachael. History of the British Film, 1918-1929. George Allen & Unwin, 1971.
