= Dion Titheradge =

Australian actor and playwright (1889–1934)

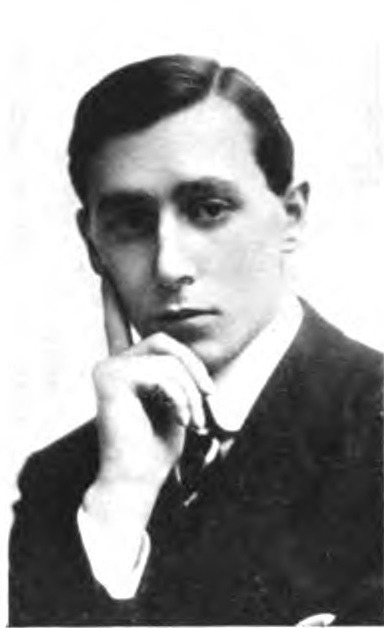
Titheradge, c. 1916

Dion Titheradge (30 March 1889 – 16 November 1934) was an Australian-born actor and writer of revues, plays and screenplays.

== Early life ==
Dion Titheradge was born in Melbourne, Australia in 1889, son of the actor George Sutton Titheradge. He was brother of the actress Madge Titheradge.

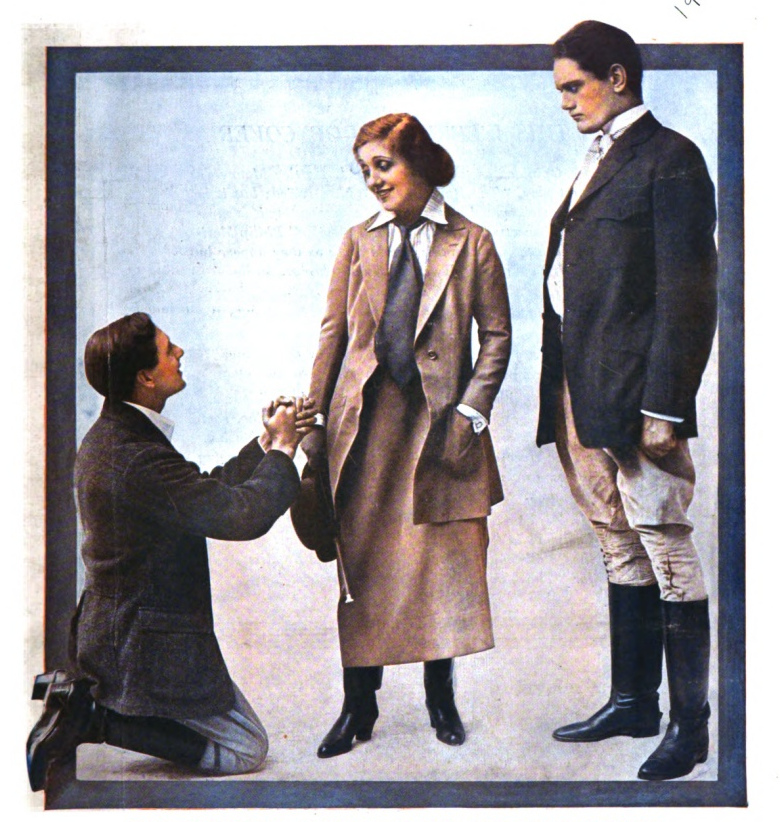
Titheradge (left) with Laurette Taylor and Philip Merivale in The Harp of Life

His early career was as an actor. His first appearance on stage was in 1908 at the Theatre Royal, Newcastle-on-Tyne, in The Woman of Kronstadt, and he then toured Australia and New Zealand playing various roles. In 1910 he was a member of Lewis Waller's company, touring with him in the play Bardelys the Magnificent.

Titheradge appeared with Waller in September–October 1912 at Daly's Theatre, New York, in Henry V. Also in New York, he played Harry Anson in The Whip at the Manhattan Opera House from November 1912 to April 1913; he appeared in Life by Thompson Buchanan at the same theatre from October 1914 to March 1915, and in The Harp of Life by J. Hartley Manners at the Globe Theatre from November 1916 to May 1917.

== Writer ==
Writing became important in his subsequent career. Titheradge and Kenneth Duffield, of South Australia, created a successful West End revue in London in 1920 and, before Duffield returned to Australia in 1922, they produced several more revues including A to Z, Puss Puss, Snap and Pot Luck.

The song "And Her Mother Came Too", of which he wrote the lyrics, became famous; the music was by Ivor Novello, and it was first heard in A to Z, which opened at the Prince of Wales Theatre on 11 October 1921. It was sung by Jack Buchanan. Also famous was his sketch "Dinner Napkins" (also known as "Double Damask"), heard in Noel Gay's show Clowns in Clover (1927).

Titheradge wrote many plays, often using the pen-name 'Geoffrey Warren'. His play Loose Ends, by 'Geoffrey Warren', was first performed at the Duke of York's Theatre in London from 19 April 1926, where it ran for 81 performances, transferring to the Shaftesbury Theatre from 7 June. It was reported in The Stage that Dion Thitheradge announced to the audience after the first performance that 'The author is not in the audience', an accepted phrase indicating that the author was on the stage. He directed and appeared in the play in New York where it ran for 40 performances from 1 November 1926 at the Ritz Theatre. Titheradge played the part of Malcolm Forres and Brenda Fallon was played by Molly Kerr in both London and New York. Loose Ends was later (1930) made into a film of the same title. His play The Crooked Billet, a murder mystery, ran for 168 performances from 13 October 1927 at the Royalty Theatre in London, and was made into a film of the same name (1929).

He wrote the screenplays for the films Mr. Bill the Conqueror (1932) and Dangerous Ground (1934).

== Family ==
Titheradge married Margaret Ann Bolton in 1909 in New South Wales; their children were Meg and the writer Peter Dion Titheradge (1910–1989). They divorced in 1927, and he married the actress Madge Stuart in 1928.

He died in London in 1934.
