= Madge Titheradge =

Australian-born actress (1887–1961)

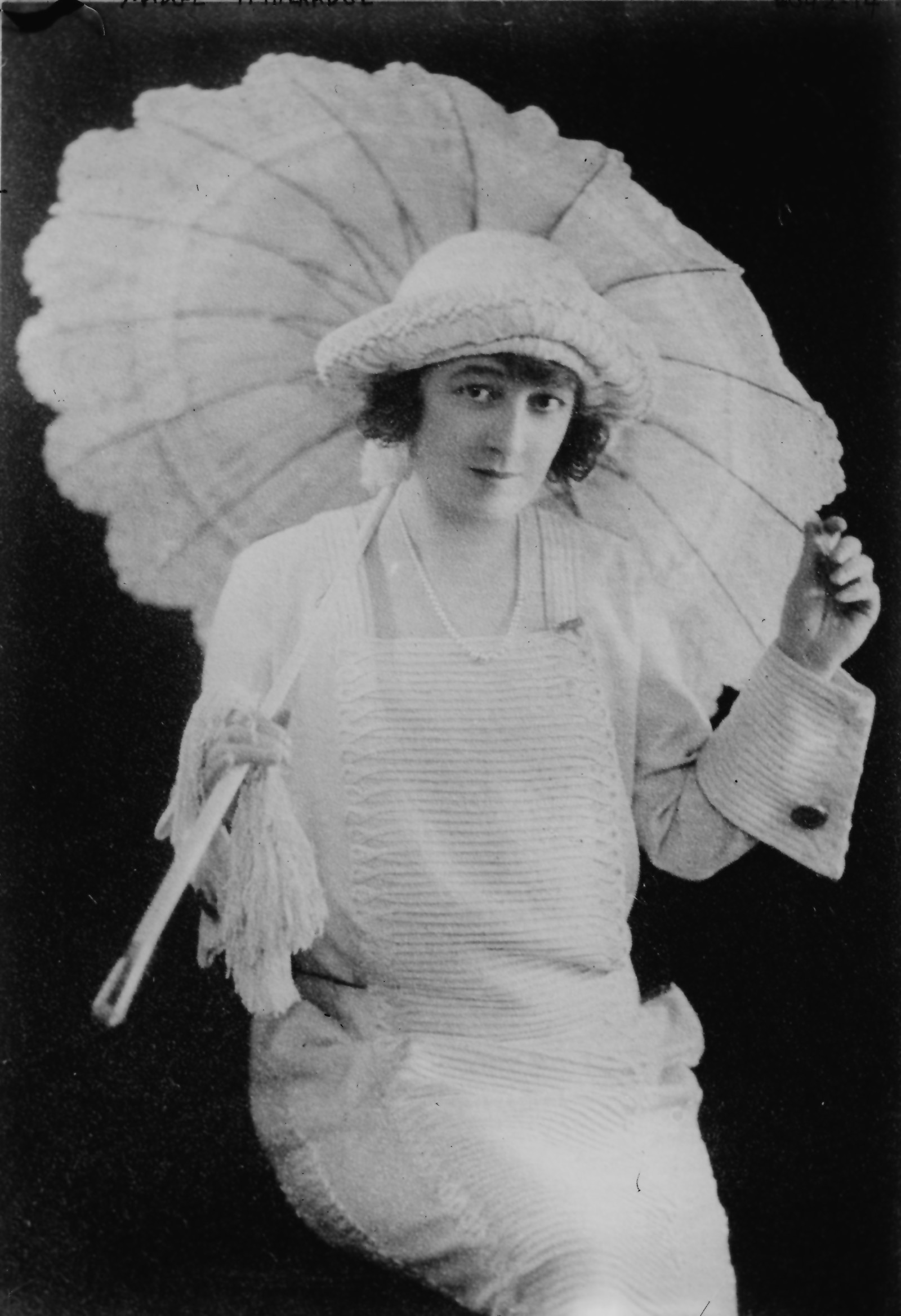
Madge Titheradge, c. 1915

Madge Titheradge (2 July 1887 – 14 November 1961) was an Australian-born actress who became a leading actress in the West End of London and on Broadway.

She began as a child actress before the First World War, and went on to star in the 1920s and 1930s. Her range was unusually wide, including Shakespeare, pantomime, Ibsen, farce, drawing-room comedy and Ruritanian romance. Ill health forced her early retirement from the stage in 1938, and she lived in retirement until her death at her home in Surrey, aged 74.

== Life and career ==
=== Early years, 1887–1907 ===
Titheradge was born in Melbourne, to a theatrical English family. She was the daughter of the actor George Titheradge and his wife Alma, née Saegert (Stage name Alma Santon); her younger brother Dion became an actor and playwright. She was educated at a private school in Hampstead, and in 1902, shortly after her fifteenth birthday, she appeared at the Garrick Theatre, London, as the Second Water Baby in Rutland Barrington's adaptation of The Water Babies. Barrington recalled in his memoirs "Madge Titheradge was our première danseuse and made a great success with her dance outside the little school-house, or rather cottage; she danced with such evident enjoyment of her work."

Over the next three years Titheradge performed at a succession of West End theatres, including the Haymarket and His Majesty's, appearing at the latter as Mimi in Herbert Beerbohm Tree's production of Trilby. In 1907 she appeared at the Playhouse with Cyril Maude in a French farce adapted into English as "French as He is Spoke", and the following year played the same role in French at His Majesty's in the original version, L'Anglais tel qu'on le parle, with Coquelin aîné.

=== 1908–1928 ===
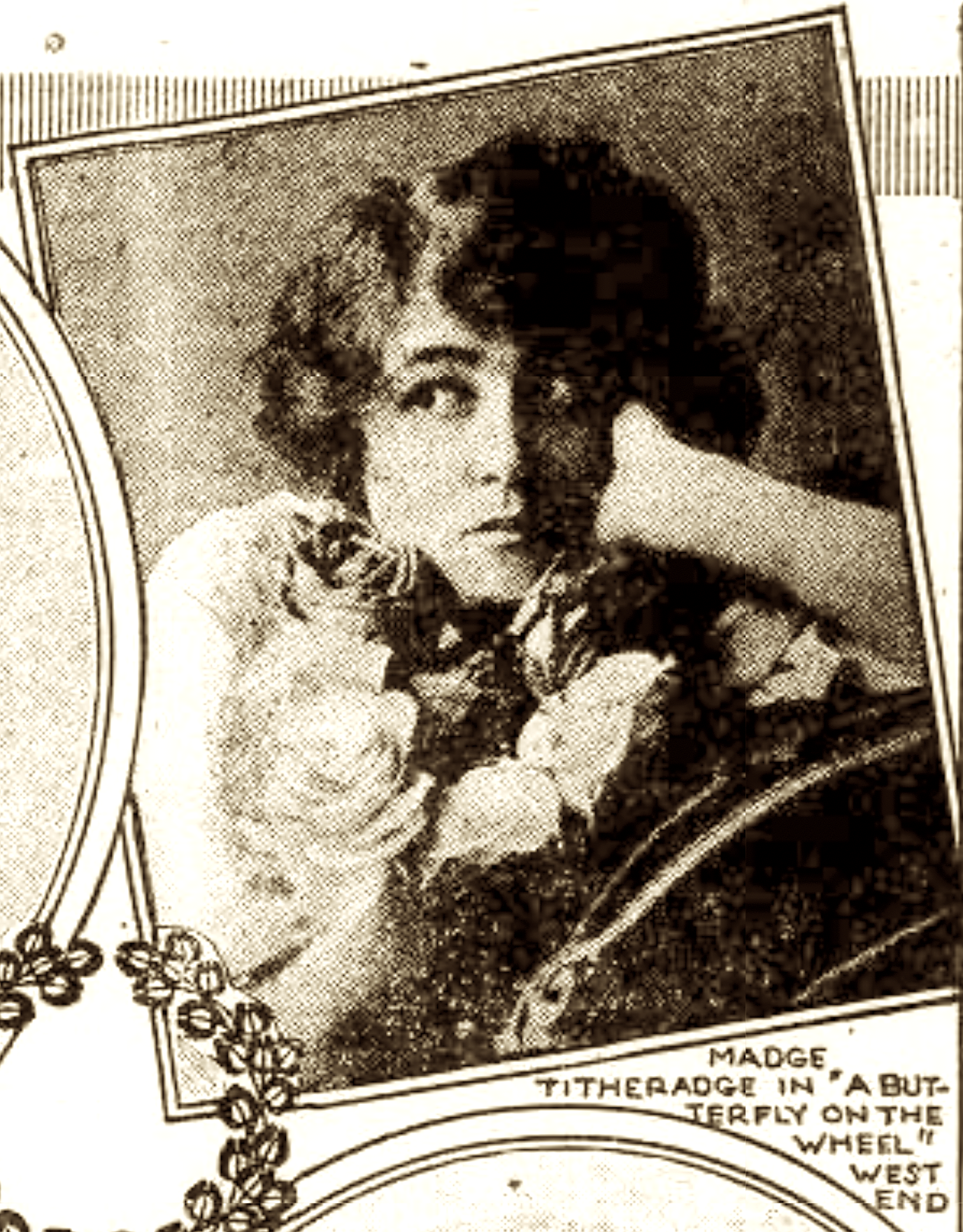
Madge Titheradge in A Butterfly on the Wheel (1912). Published in The New York Times.

In 1908 Titheradge joined Lewis Waller's company, in which she played her first Shakespearian role, Princess Katherine in Henry V. In 1910 she married the actor Charles Quartermaine, with whom she appeared on stage in several productions. The marriage was happy at first, but the couple grew apart and in 1919 they divorced.

Titheradge rejoined Waller for several later productions in London, New York and on tour in the US (1912) and Australia (1913) – her only return to the country in which she was born. In Australia she performed in A Marriage of Convenience and Henry V, a play that also featured her father George S. Titheradge. While there on tour she also played Peggy Admaston in Edward Hemmerde and Francis Neilson's A Butterfly on the Wheel. In London in December 1914 she played the name part in J. M. Barrie's Peter Pan, with Hilda Trevelyan as Wendy and the fifteen-year-old Noël Coward as Slightly. She made her screen debut in the 1915 film Brigadier Gerard starring opposite Waller. Her obituarist in The Times wrote of the next phase of her career:

Thereafter came a number of variegated parts at Drury Lane, where she showed that she could enact a highly strung heroine of melodrama and the principal boy in pantomime with equal facility. Thus in 1916 she was in the "autumn drama" The Best of Luck; in successive pantomimes she was "principal boy" and after a season of film work in California she returned to Drury Lane in 1920 for what proved to be a spectacular success for the theatre, herself and the leading man, Godfrey Tearle – the stage version of Robert Hichen's novel The Garden of Allah.

Titheradge's roles in the 1920s included Desdemona to Tearle's Othello (Court Theatre, 1921), Nora Helmer in Ibsen's A Doll's House (Playhouse, 1923) and Beatrice in Much Ado About Nothing with Tearle as Benedick (1926). She created two roles in plays by Coward: Nadya in The Queen Was in the Parlour (St Martin's, 1926), and Janet Ebony in Home Chat (Duke of York's, 1927). She then went to New York, and at the Majestic Theatre in January 1928, she played Anna, Baroness Ostermann in Ashley Dukes's "The Patriot".

=== Second marriage and later years ===
In 1928 Titheradge married an American businessman, Edgar Park, and temporarily retired. Sir John Gielgud, who greatly admired Titheradge, recalled that her husband lost his fortune in the Wall Street crash of 1929, leading her to return to the stage. After nearly five years absence she reappeared in the West End at the Haymarket in December 1932 as Clary Frohner in Business with America. At the Globe in September 1933 she succeeded Fay Compton as Norma Matthews in Proscenium, co-starring with Ivor Novello. One of her most celebrated roles came late in her career, when she played Julie Cavendish in Theatre Royal by Edna Ferber and George S. Kaufman directed by Coward at the Lyric Theatre in October 1934. She co-starred with Marie Tempest and the young Laurence Olivier in a thinly-disguised parody of the American theatrical family the Barrymores. At Wyndham's Theatre in, September 1936, again directed by Coward, she played the title role in Jacques Deval's comedy Mademoiselle, heading a cast that included Isabel Jeans, Greer Garson and Cecil Parker. During the run of the play her health began to decline; she suffered from severe arthritis, and after one more role – Edith Venables in A Thing Apart, in March 1938 – she retired. Her husband died in that year.

Titheradge died on 14 November 1961, at the age of 74, at her house in Fetcham, Surrey.

== Films ==
- Brigadier Gerard (1915)
- A Fair Impostor (1916)
- The Woman Who Was Nothing (1917)
- God Bless Our Red, White and Blue (1918)
- Gamblers All (1919)
- David and Jonathan (1920)
- Her Story (1920)
- The Husband Hunter (1920)
- Love in the Wilderness (1920)
- A Temporary Gentleman (1920)

== References and sources ==
=== Sources ===
- Barrington, Rutland (1908). Rutland Barrington: A Record of Thirty-Five Years' Experience on the English Stage. London: Grant Richards. OCLC 7745426.
- Gielgud, John (1979). An Actor and His Time. London: Sidgwick and Jackson. ISBN 978-0-283-98573-7.
- Mander, Raymond; Mitchenson, Joe (2000) [First published 1957]. Theatrical Companion to Coward. Barry Day and Sheridan Morley (2000 edition, ed.) (second ed.). London: Oberon Books. ISBN 978-1-84002-054-0.
- Parker, John; Gaye, Freda; et al. (1978). Who Was Who in the Theatre: Volume 4 – Q–Z. Detroit. OCLC 310466463.
