= The Edge O' Beyond =

1908 novel by Gertrude Page

- Early edition
- Author: Gertrude Page
- Language: English
- Genre: Drama
- Publisher: Hurst and Blackett
- Publication date: 1908
- Publication place: United Kingdom
- Media type: Print

The Edge O' Beyond is a 1908 novel by the British writer Gertrude Page. Like a number of her works it is set in Rhodesia where she had settled. It was translated into both Czech and Polish.

== Adaptations ==
The novel was adapted by Page into a West End play. This was subsequently adapted into a 1919 British silent film Edge O' Beyond starring Ruby Miller who had also appeared in the play.

== Bibliography ==
- Bamford, Kenton. Distorted images: British national identity and film in the 1920s. I.B. Tauris, 1999.
- Free, Melissa. Beyond Gold and Diamonds: Genre, the Authorial Informant, and the British South African Novel. SUNY Press, 2021.
- Goble, Alan. The Complete Index to Literary Sources in Film. Walter de Gruyter, 1999.
