= Cyril Harcourt =

British actor and playwright (1872–1924)

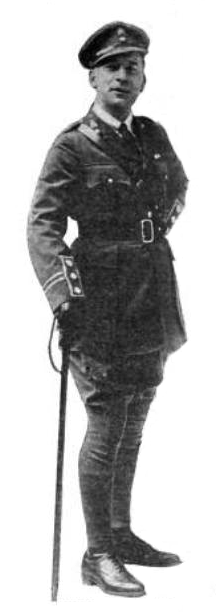
- In A Pair of Petticoats (1918)
- Born: Cyril Worsley Perkins; 30 December 1872; Hendon, Middlesex, England
- Died: 4 March 1924 (aged 51); Menton, Alpes-Maritimes, France
- Burial place: Cimetière du Trabuquet
- Occupations: Actor, playwright

Cyril Harcourt (1872–1924) was a noted writer for the London and New York City stages who appeared in his own plays.

== Biography ==
Born in Hendon, Middlesex, on 30 December 1872, Cyril Harcourt (originally named Cyril Worsley Perkins), was educated at Bedford School between 1881 and 1888. He intended to take holy orders but instead qualified as an engineer. He then studied for the operatic stage, ultimately becoming an actor in his own plays. His first play, The Axis, was produced for the Criterion Theatre in July 1905, and was followed by The Reformer in 1907, and The Recompense in 1910. He had greater success with A Place in the Sun, at the Comedy Theatre in 1913, in which he played a brilliant man of letters soured by early poverty. However, his greatest success and his most well-known play was A Pair of Silk Stockings, produced at the Criterion Theatre in 1914, which transferred to New York City and had been adapted for the cinema three times by 1932. In May 1917, Wanted, A Husband, starring Gladys Cooper, was produced at the Playhouse Theatre. In the Night was produced at the Kingsway Theatre in 1919, and Will You Kiss Me? was produced at the Comedy Theatre in 1920. Cyril Harcourt set up a management company with Norman Pritchard at the Comedy Theatre, New York, in 1918. He died in Menton, Alpes-Maritimes, France, on 4 March 1924, aged 51.

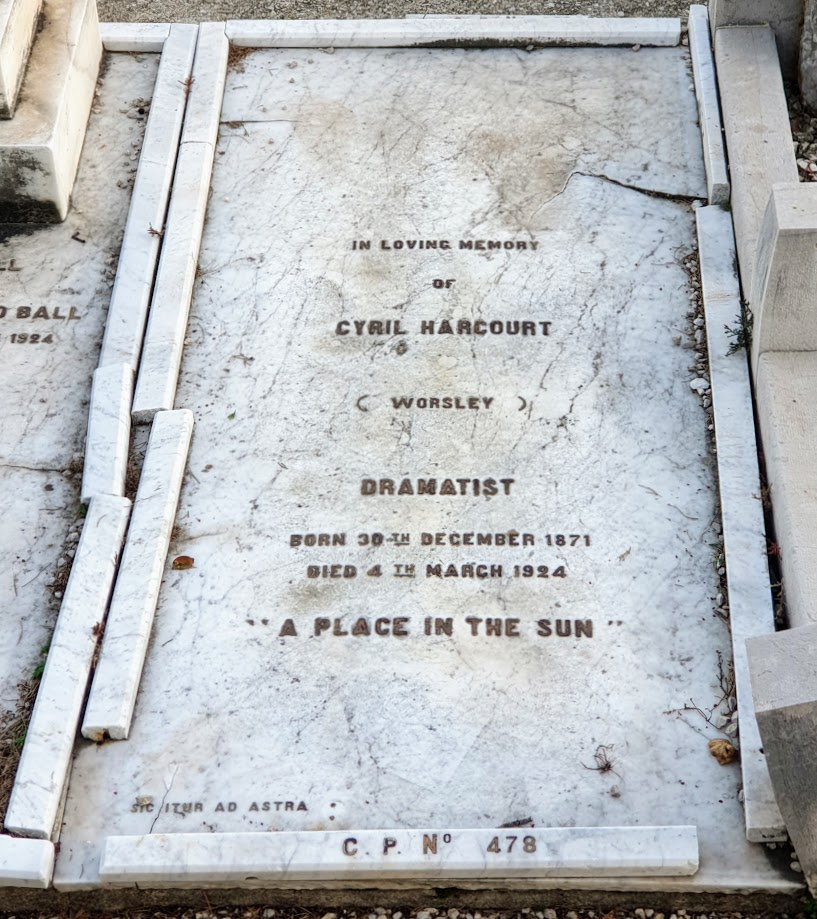
Harcourt's grave at Cimetière du Trabuquet

== Plays ==
- The Axis, Criterion Theatre, 1905
- The Reformer, Criterion Theatre, 1907
- The Recompense, Criterion Theatre, 1910
- A Place in the Sun, Comedy Theatre, 1913
- A Pair of Silk Stockings, Criterion Theatre, 1914
- Wanted, A Husband, Playhouse Theatre, 1917
- In the Night, Kingsway Theatre, 1919
- The Intruder, 1920
- Will You Kiss Me?, Comedy Theatre, 1920

== Film adaptations ==
- A Lady's Name, 1916
- A Pair of Silk Stockings, 1918
- In the Night, 1922
- They Just Had to Get Married, 1932

== Novels ==
- The World's Daughter, 1913
- First Cousin to a Dream, 1914
