= Paddy the Next Best Thing (novel) =

1908 novel by Gertrude Page

- Early edition
- Author: Gertrude Page
- Language: English
- Genre: Romance
- Publisher: Hurst and Blackett
- Publication date: 1908
- Publication place: United Kingdom
- Media type: Print

Paddy the Next Best Thing (also written as Paddy-The-Next-Best-Thing) is a 1908 romantic comedy novel by the British writer Gertrude Page.

The heroine of the story is Paddy Adair, the daughter of an impoverished Irish landowner near Carlingford. Her father, General Adair, had hoped she would be a boy, but is delighted by the high-spirited Paddy who dubs herself as "the next best thing" to a boy. Paddy falls in love with another landowner, who had once been involved with her elder sister.

== Adaptations ==
Gayer Mackay and Robert Ord adapted the novel into a successful 1920 West End play of the same title. The cast was:

- General Adair – J. H. Barnes
- Dr Davy Adair – Clive Currie
- Eileen Adair – Betty Faire
- Mary O'Hara – Margaret Nicholls
- Jack O'Hara – Anew McMaster
- Laurence Blake – Ion Swinley
- Doreen Blake – Eithne McChee
- Gwendoline Carew – Winifred Evans
- Lord Sellahy – H. V. Tollemache
- Micky – Hyland T. O'Shea
- Webb – Ethel Callanan
- Mrs Bingley – Christine Jensen
- Mrs Putter – Rose Edouin
- Paddy – Peggy O'Neill.

The play opened at the Savoy Theatre on 5 April 1920, transferred briefly to the Strand Theatre in February 1922, and moved back to the Savoy in March, completing its run of 867 performances on 22 April 1922.

The novel has been made into films on two occasions: a 1923 British silent film directed by Herbert Wilcox and starring Mae Marsh and a 1933 American sound film directed by Harry Lachman and starring Janet Gaynor

== Sources ==
- Block, Andrew. Key Books of British Authors, 1600-1932. D. Archer, 1933.
- Goble, Alan. The Complete Index to Literary Sources in Film. Walter de Gruyter, 1999.
- Wearing, J. P. (2014). The London Stage 1920–1929: A Calendar of Productions, Performers, and Personnel. Lanham, Maryland: Rowman & Littlefield. ISBN 978-0-8108-9302-3.
