= Gertrude Page =

Anglo-Rhodesian novelist (1872–1922)

- Born: Gertrude Eliza Page; 1872; Erdington, Warwickshire, England
- Died: 1 April 1922 (aged 49–50); Mazoe District, Southern Rhodesia
- Resting place: 30.9316687°E 17.2521583°S
- Education: Bedford High School
- Spouse: Alec Dobbin (m. 1902–1922)
- Writing career
- Notable work: See #Selected bibliography

Gertrude Eliza Page (1872 – 1 April 1922) was an Anglo-Rhodesian novelist.

== Biography ==
Educated at Bedford High School, Page wrote for The Girl's Own Paper as a teenager. Marrying George Alexander "Alec" Dobbin in 1902, she moved with him to Rhodesia, where she died in 1922. Her Rhodesia novels were all written between the years 1907 and 1922. In The Rhodesian (1914), Page writes admiringly of agricultural productivity and colonial settlement in her "empty" Rhodesian landscapes: "The Valley of Ruins no longer lies alone and unheeded in the sunlight; and no longer do the hills look down upon rich plains left solely to ... idle pleasures."

Her best-selling book was Paddy the Next Best Thing, which was dramatized and performed in Britain at the Savoy Theatre. Another novel by Page, The Edge O' Beyond, of which more than 300,000 copies were sold, was also made into a play as well as being a 1919 film (directed by Fred W. Durrant, featuring Isobel Elsom, Owen Nares, Minna Grey, C. M. Hallard and Ruby Miller).

== Selected bibliography ==
- Love in the Wilderness, 1907
- Paddy the Next Best Thing, 1908
- The Edge O' Beyond, 1908
- The Silent Rancher, 1909
- Two Lovers and a Lighthouse, 1910
- Where the Strange Roads Go Down, 1910
- Jill's Rhodesian Philosophy, or, The Dam Farm, 1910
- Winding Paths, 1911
- The Rhodesian, 1912
- The Great Splendour, 1912
- The Pathway, 1914
- Follow After, 1915
- Some There Are, 1916
- The Supreme Desire, 1916
- The Course of My Ship (with Foster-Melliar), 1918
- The Veldt Trail, 1919
- Far From the Limelight (and other tales), 1920
- Jill on a Ranch, 1922
- The Mysterious Strangers
