= The Limping Man =

The Limping Man may refer to:

- The Limping Man (play), a 1931 play by William Matthew Scott
- The Limping Man (1936 film), a British film adaptation of the play directed by Walter Summers
- The Limping Man (1953 film), a British film directed by Cy Endfield
