= Saville Theatre =

Former cinema and theatre in London

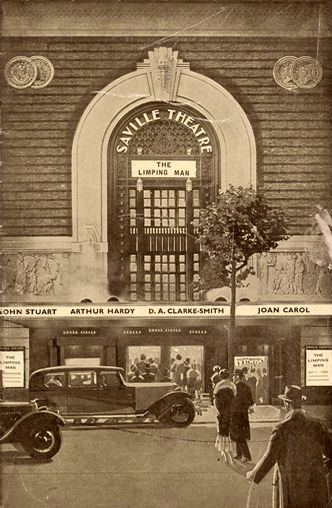
- Illustration from theatre programme of 1936 based on a photo of the Saville Theatre, featuring The Limping Man, a 1931 play by William Matthew Scott
- Interactive map of Saville Theatre
- Address: 135 Shaftesbury Avenue; Camden, London; United Kingdom
- Coordinates: 51.514269°N 0.128242°W
- Owner: Yoo Capital
- Capacity: 1,426 (1931)
- Type: Live arts venue (former cinema and theatre)
- Current use: Closed for redevelopment

Construction
- Opened: 8 October 1931
- Closed: 11 August 2024
- Years active: 1931–2024
- Architects: Sir Thomas Bennett, with Bertie Crewe

Website
- https://yoocapital.com/project/the-saville/

The Saville Theatre building is a former West End theatre and cinema at 135 Shaftesbury Avenue in the London Borough of Camden. The theatre opened in 1931, and became a music venue during the 1960s. In 1970, it became a cinema, most recently as the Odeon Covent Garden.

The Odeon Covent Garden permanently closed on August 11, 2024 pending site redevelopment.

== History ==
=== Theatre years ===
The theatre was designed by the architect Sir Thomas Bennett, in consultation with Bertie Crewe, and opened on 8 October 1931, with a play with music by H. F. Maltby, For The Love Of Mike.

The theatre benefited from a capacity of 1,426 on three levels and a stage that was 31.5 feet (9.6 m) wide, with a depth of 30.5 feet (9.3 m). The interior was opulent, The Stage reviewed the new theatre on its opening:

The stalls bar and saloon lounge adjoining, will please the public, special care has been exercised in their equipment and decoration. The bar, which has mural paintings by Mr A. R. Thompson, is 18 ft by 54 ft in front of the counters, while the lounge, which is also decorated by the same artist, is 42 ft by 40 ft. There is a sort of shopping arcade in and about the lounge, as in the up-to-date hotels, and it is quite big enough for tea dances or concerts. So comfortable, indeed, are the lounge and the bar at the Saville, that it is to be feared that something more than a warning bell will be necessary to clear them.

The theatre was damaged in the Blitz in 1941, but reopened quickly allowing a revised version of the revue Up and Doing to complete a run of 332 performances. An American comedy, Junior Miss, opened in March 1943 and ran for 518 performances. In April 1946 the revue Here Come the Boys, starring Bobby Howes and Jack Hulbert, started a run of 336 performances.

Ivor Novello's musical Gay's the Word ran for 502 performances from February 1951. In 1952 Love from Judy, a musical adaption of Daddy-Long-Legs, opened in September and ran for 594 performances. In 1955 the interior of the theatre was completely refurbished by Laurence Irving, and John Collins created a new mural for the stalls bar. In 1958 the musical Expresso Bongo began a 315-performance run.

In 1962 Peter Ustinov starred in his own play Photo Finish, which ran for 253 performances, and Laurence Olivier appeared in David Turner's Semi-Detached, which ran for 133 performances. The following year Pickwick, a musical adaption of The Pickwick Papers, premiered on 4 July, featuring Harry Secombe in the title role. It was a success, running for 694 performances.

=== Epstein years ===
A poster from September 1967 advertising Sundays at the Saville

Brian Epstein, manager of the Beatles, leased the theatre in 1965, presenting both drama (including works by Arnold Wesker) and rock and roll shows. Plays in 1965 included The Solid Gold Cadillac with Sid James and Margaret Rutherford, which ran for 142 performances.

The D'Oyly Carte Opera Company played two ten-week London seasons at the Saville, from 6 December 1965 to 12 February 1966 and 18 December 1967 to 24 February 1968, presenting eleven Savoy Operas in each season.

The venue saw appearances of the Jimi Hendrix Experience in January 1967 when they opened for the Who, and again in August 1967. The Move and Procol Harum also appeared on the bill. Acts including Chuck Berry, the Beatles, Jimi Hendrix, Pink Floyd, Elton John, Nirvana, Cream, Fairport Convention, the Incredible String Band, the Rolling Stones and the Bee Gees also appeared there.

The theatre was sold in 1970, and returned to presenting theatrical productions and under the new management it presented the London premiere of The Resistible Rise of Arturo Ui, a production that brought Leonard Rossiter to public attention. Cameron Mackintosh's revival of Anything Goes was a flop that year, playing for only two weeks, and the last play to be performed at the theatre was Enemy by Robin Maugham, opening for a run of 58 performances in December 1969.

=== Cinema years ===
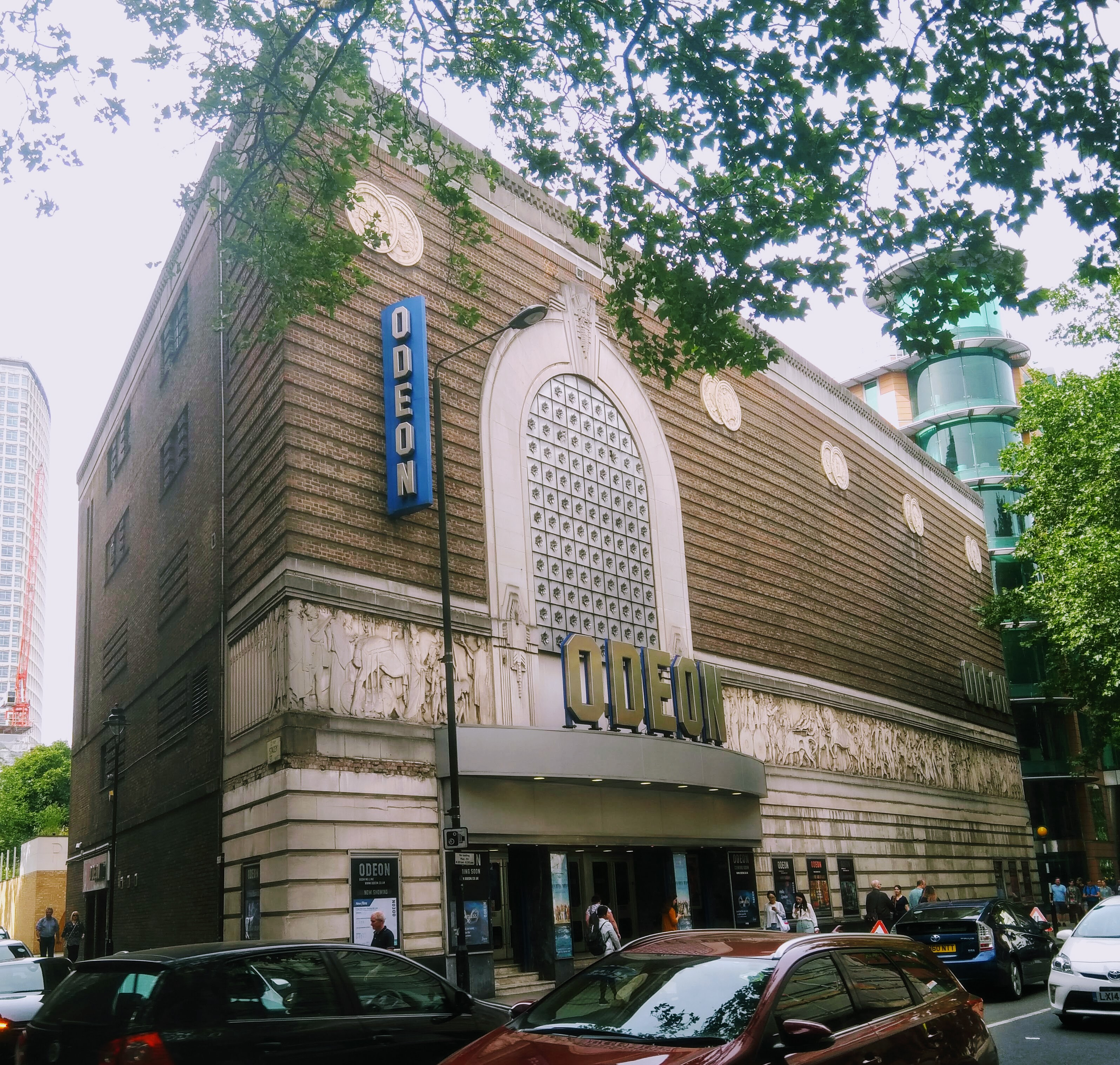
The Odeon Covent Garden in 2018

The Saville was taken over by ABC Theatres (owned by EMI) in 1970 and converted into a two-screen cinema by William Ryder and Associates. The gala opening on 22 December 1970 featured There's a Girl in My Soup in ABC 1 (616 seats) and The Railway Children in ABC 2 (581 seats). The stage area became administration offices and little of the original theatre internal structure remains.

In 2001, the building was taken over by the Odeon Cinemas group to become the four screen Odeon Covent Garden cinema.

The exterior of the theatre retains many of the original 1930s details, although the wrought iron arch window on the frontage has been replaced by glass blocks. A sculptured frieze by British sculptor Gilbert Bayes, which runs across the building for nearly 130 feet (40 m), remains and represents Drama Through The Ages.

=== Redevelopment ===
The Saville was acquired in October 2021 by Yoo Capital with plans to redevelop the site as a live arts venue with a hotel and restaurant. The Odeon Covent Garden permanently closed on August 11, 2024.

The theatre was temporarily made it into a club night called ‘lost’

Yoo Capital's plan for a nine-storey hotel, with a 622-seat theatre in the basement, received planning consent in April 2025.

== Sources ==
- Gaye, Freda, ed. (1967). Who's Who in the Theatre (fourteenth ed.). London: Sir Isaac Pitman and Sons. OCLC 5997224.
- Rollins, Cyril; R. John Witts (1962). The D'Oyly Carte Opera Company in Gilbert and Sullivan Operas: A Record of Productions, 1875–1961. London: Michael Joseph. With four supplements, privately printed. OCLC 504581419
- Wearing, J. P. (2021). The London Stage 1960–1980: A Calendar of Dramatic Productions. London: Word Press. (no ISBN or OCLC)
