= Marry for money =

"Marry for Money" is a 2009 country song by Jimmy Melton and Dave Turnbull.

Marry for money or marrying for money may also refer to:

- Dowry, payment by the bride's family to the groom or his family at the time of marriage
- Bride price, payment by a groom or his family to the woman or the family of the woman he will marry
- Gold digger, a person who engages in a type of transactional sexual relationship for money and social status rather than love
- Marriage of convenience, a marriage contracted for reasons other than that of love and commitment
- Transactional sex, sexual relationships where the giving and/or receiving of gifts, money or other services is an important factor

== See also ==
- Don't Marry for Money, 1923 American silent drama film
- Married for Money, 1939 comedy play by the British author Will Scott
- "Re-Marrying for Money", an album by Henry Kaiser
