= Creeping Shadows =

1931 British film by John Orton

- Directed by: John Orton
- Written by: John Orton
- Based on: The Limping Man by William Matthew Scott
- Produced by: John Orton
- Starring: Franklin Dyall; Arthur Hardy; Margot Grahame
- Music by: Colin Wark
- Production company: British International Pictures
- Distributed by: Wardour Films
- Release date: 28 July 1931
- Running time: 79 minutes
- Country: United Kingdom
- Language: English

Creeping Shadows (U.S. title: The Limping Man) is a 1931 British crime film directed by John Orton and starring Franklin Dyall, Arthur Hardy and Margot Grahame. It was written by Orton based on the 1930 West End play The Limping Man by William Matthew Scott, and was made at the Welwyn Studios of British International Pictures.

== Preservation status ==
The British Film Institute National Archive holds a collection of stills but no film or video materials.

== Plot ==
At a party to celebrate his engagement, hosted by Brian Nash at his country estate, the festivities are disrupted by the appearance in the grounds of the eerie shadow of a Limping Man, followed by the discovery of a body. Disher, a private detective, joins the guests and begins an investigation. Following a series of strange occurrences that cast suspicion on many of the people present, Disher uncovers the truth: Brian has been kidnapped and hidden away by his criminal twin brother. The twin has been posing as Brian to escape the vengeance of the Limping Man, a fellow crook he had previously betrayed in America, and to cover up the tracks of his companion, whom he had just murdered in the woods.

== Cast ==
- Franklin Dyall as Disher
- Arthur Hardy as Sir Edwin Paget
- Margot Grahame as Gloria Paget
- Lester Matthews as Brian Nash
- Jeanne Stuart as Olga Hoyt
- Gerald Rawlinson as Paul Tegle
- David Hawthorne as Peter Hoyt
- Charles Farrell as Chicago Joe
- Henrietta Watson as Lady Paget
- Matthew Boulton as Inspector Potter
- Percy Parsons as Limping Man
- Hal Gordon
- Samuel Pringle
- Ernest Stidwell

== Reception ==
Film Weekly wrote: "The progress of the story of this murder mystery is as irritatingly slow as the motion of the shadows in the title of the film; and, like them, indefinite in form ... Much of it is dull, verbose stuff. Some of it is interesting, and a few of the thrills are quite thrilling. ... This is not entirely a poor picture, but it is disappointing in small details."

Kine Weekly wrote: "An ingenious crook drama ... which has a strong cast and excellent presentation, but suffers from jerky continuity and slow movement. There are many unexpected moments, but it takes so long to lead up to them that their dramatic effect is minimised. ... Although the picture provides fair popular diversion, judicious cutting would considerably enhance the entertainment values."
