= The Limping Man (play) =

1930 play

- Original language: English
- Written by: Will Scott
- Genre: Thriller

Premiere
- Date: 20 January 1930
- Place: Pleasure Gardens Theatre, Folkstone

The Limping Man is a 1930 mystery thriller play by the British author Will Scott. It premiered at the Pleasure Gardens Theatre in Folkstone before transferring to London's West End. It ran for 91 performances between 19 January and 18 April 1931, initially at the Royaly Theatre before switching to the Apollo Theatre and then to the Shaftesbury. The West End cast included Arthur Hardy, Ronald Simpson, Franklin Dyall, Eve Gray. It subsequently returned to the West End for a longer run from 1935 to 1936.

== Film adaptations ==
It has been made into films on two occasions: The 1931 film Creeping Shadows was directed by J. O. C. Orton and featuring Hardy, Dyall and Margot Grahame in the cast. The second adaptation The Limping Man was made at Welwyn Studios by Walter Summers and starred Francis L. Sullivan, Hugh Wakefield and Patricia Hilliard.

== Bibliography ==
- Goble, Alan. The Complete Index to Literary Sources in Film. Walter de Gruyter, 1999.
- Wearing, J. P. The London Stage 1930–1939: A Calendar of Productions, Performers, and Personnel. Rowman & Littlefield, 2014.
