= William Matthew Scott =

Author, playwright, screenplay-writer (1893–1964)

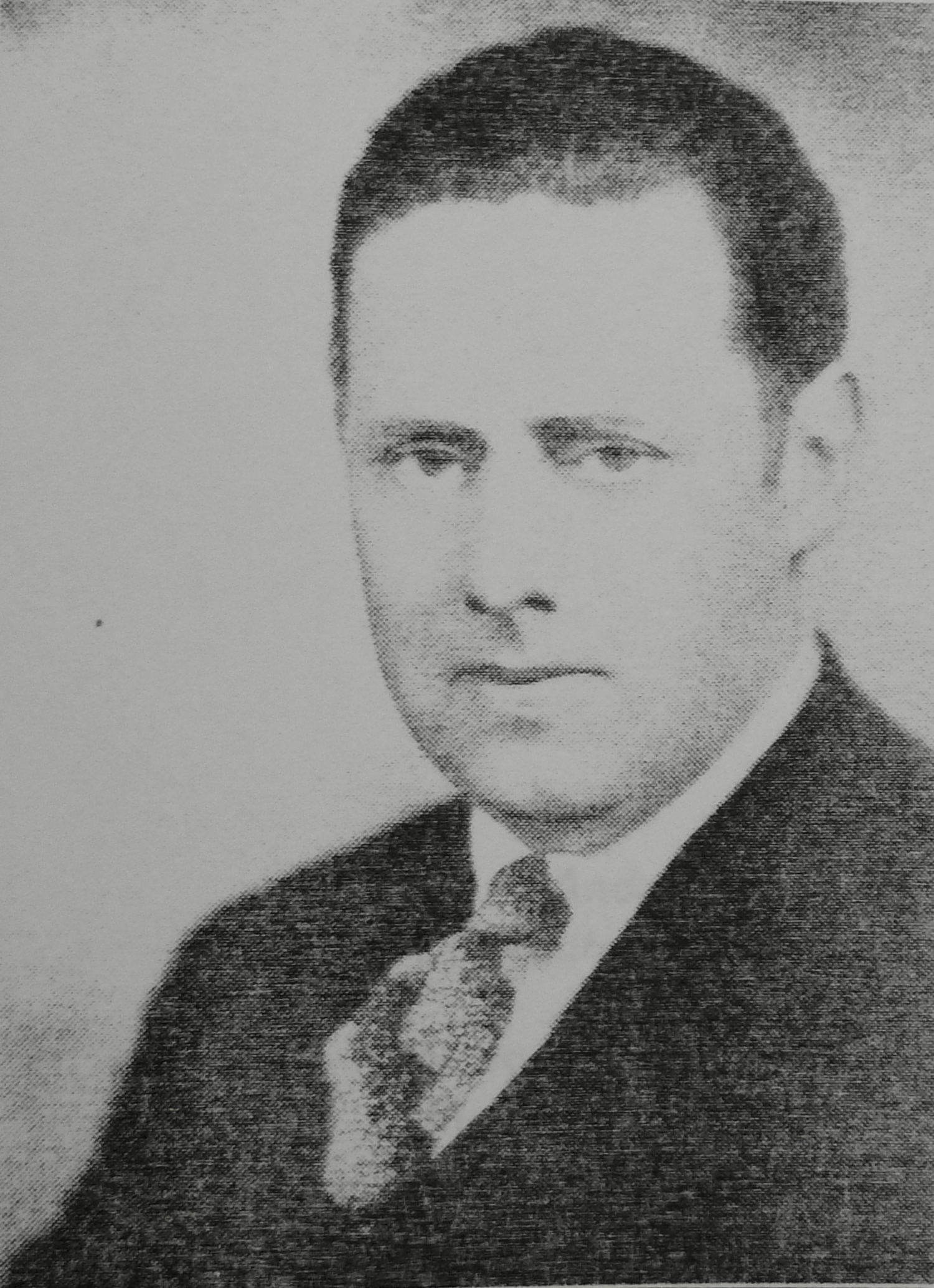
- Will Scott, 1925
- Born: William Matthew Scott; 30 September 1893; Leeds, Yorkshire
- Died: 7 May 1964 (age 70); Herne Bay, Kent
- Occupations: Journalist; novelist; short story writer; playwright; children's writer
- Writing career
- Pen name: Will Scott
- Period: 1920–1964
- Genres: Detective fiction; thriller; mystery fiction; children's literature; short story
- Notable works: The Cherrys series; Disher Detective; The Limping Man

Signature
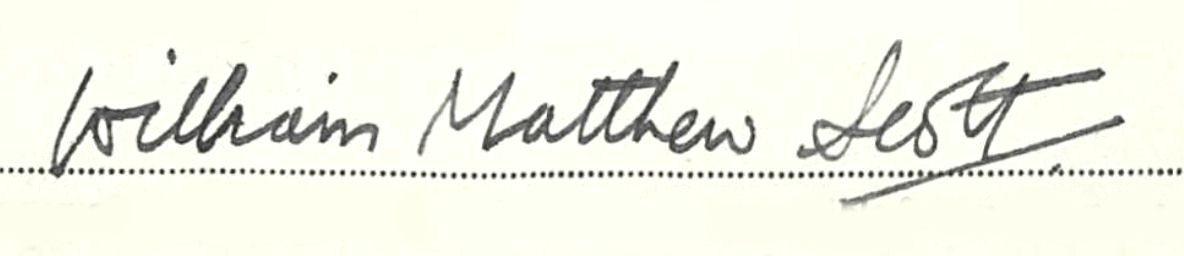

William Matthew Scott (30 September 1893 – 7 May 1964), pen name Will Scott, was a British writer of stories and books for adults and children, published from 1920 to 1965. Towards the end of his life he was best known for The Cherrys series, written for children and published between 1952 and 1965. However, in earlier years he was known for his detective novels, his stage plays which were made into films, notably The Limping Man in 1931 and 1936, and for the 2,000 short stories that he contributed to magazines and newspapers; believed to be a record for the United Kingdom during his lifetime. As of 2011, his books were out of print.

== Biography ==
=== Ancestry and youth ===
Scott's ancestors were farm labourers, artisans and parish officers from Harewood, West Yorkshire, and Nottinghamshire. They were related to Reverend Jacob Brettell, a poet, anti-Corn Laws agitator, and hymn-writer. Scott's father was William Scott, a joiner, born in Leeds in 1861. (Note: William Scott (born 1861). GRO index: Births Jun 1861 Scott William Leeds 9b 447.) His mother was Eliza Anne (or Eliza Annie) Scott née Hibbard, (Note: Eliza Anne (or Eliza Annie) Scott née Hibbard, born in Nottinghamshire in 1864. GRO index: Births Sep 1864 Hibbard Eliza Anne Nottingham 7b 197.) formerly a dressmaker. In 1891 the couple were living alone at 4 Clayfield Street in the All Souls parish of north Leeds, and Eliza Anne was a tailoress. This street of Victorian back-to-backs ran between Cambridge Road and Ashfield Leather Works; the area is now a playing field. The tannery would have been odiferous during smog or to houses downwind of it; also the nearby Meanwood Beck had in those days a history of industrial pollution. This may be the reason why William and Eliza Anne Scott took over the tobacconist's from Samuel Cooper, at 128 Camp Road, in 1893 and their son was born there. Camp Road was a terrace which fronted onto the pavement, with no gardens.

William Matthew Scott was born at 128 Camp Road (now Oatland Lane) in Little London, Leeds, Yorkshire on 30 September 1893. (Note: William Matthew Scott (30 September 1893 – 7 May 1964). GRO index: Births Dec 1893 Scott William Matthew Leeds 9b 500. Deaths Jun 1964 Scott William M. 70 Canterbury 5B 231) Camp Road was demolished in the 1960s. His place of birth was next to the poor Jewish immigrant area of tailors and shoemakers, called the Leylands, in the All Souls district of Leeds. At least until 1911 Scott lived in the working-class areas of Little London and Woodhouse, next to Meanwood Beck. The area has a history of poverty, and within living memory were the Woodhouse cholera epidemic of the 1840s, and the typhoid epidemic in nearby Headingley of 1889. When Scott was born, the middens and ashpits which had nurtured the diseases were being replaced by communal water closets. That meant that inhabitants of the back-to-backs had to walk to the end of the row to use the lavatory or empty a chamber pot but they would not catch cholera; communal outside lavatories and cobbled streets with washing lines overhead persisted while Scott lived there. However it should be remembered that street communities were strong, public transport was efficient and good quality education and libraries were available for working people. All the addresses at which Scott lived in his youth were demolished in the early 1960s slum clearances, to make way for new council estates, but many of these buildings were known to be repairable, so that "slum" was often a misnomer. Nevertheless, Scott's first recorded drawing was a chalk-drawn swan on the pavement outside his house when he was three years old, and his first published drawing was Poor Joe (1908) a drawing from life and an image of poverty.

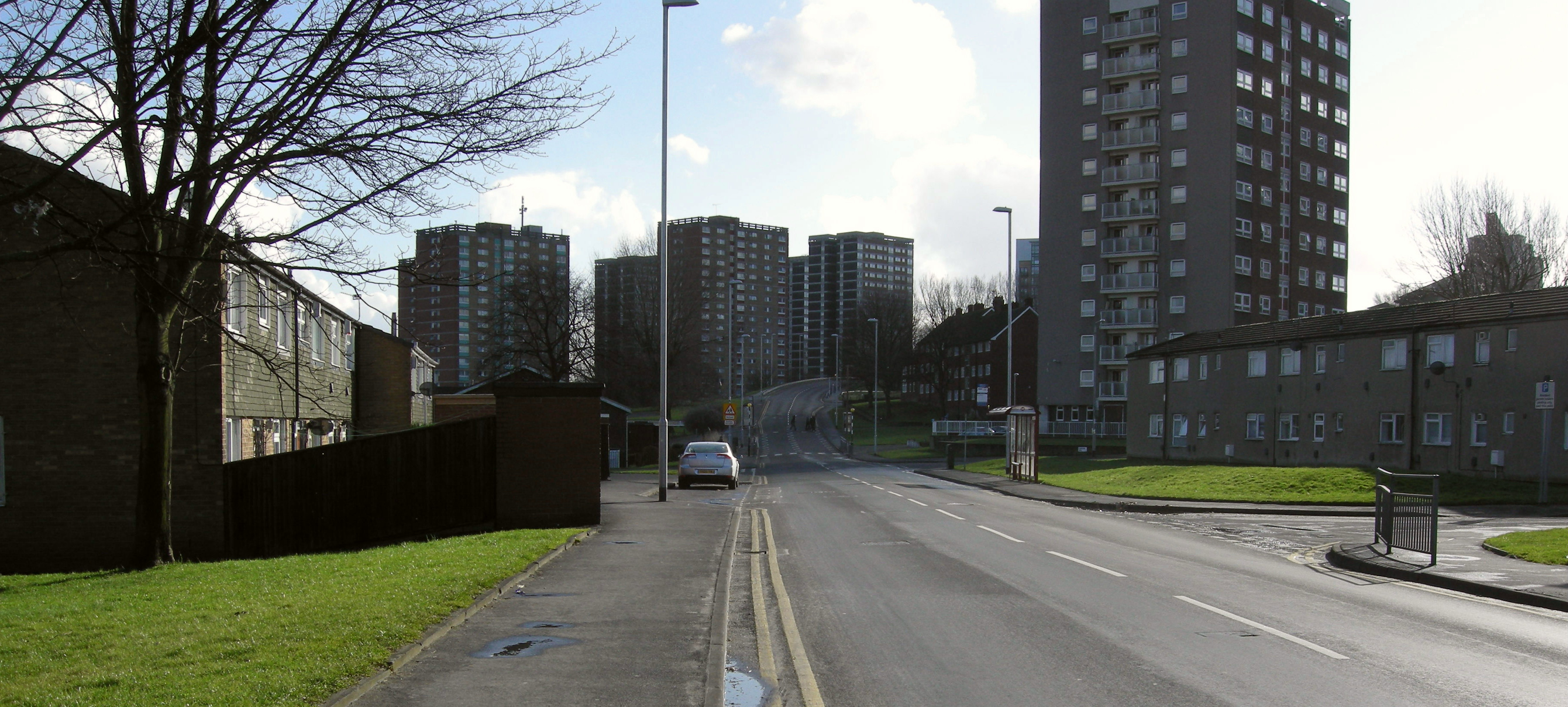
Oatland Lane 2011, the site of the demolished Camp Road where Scott was born

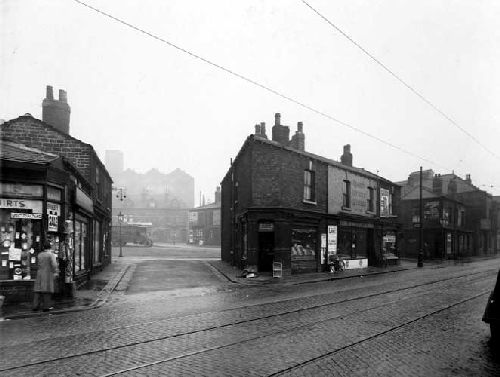
Will Scott lived as a young child in a street adjoining Ashfield Leather Works, seen in the background of this 1938 image

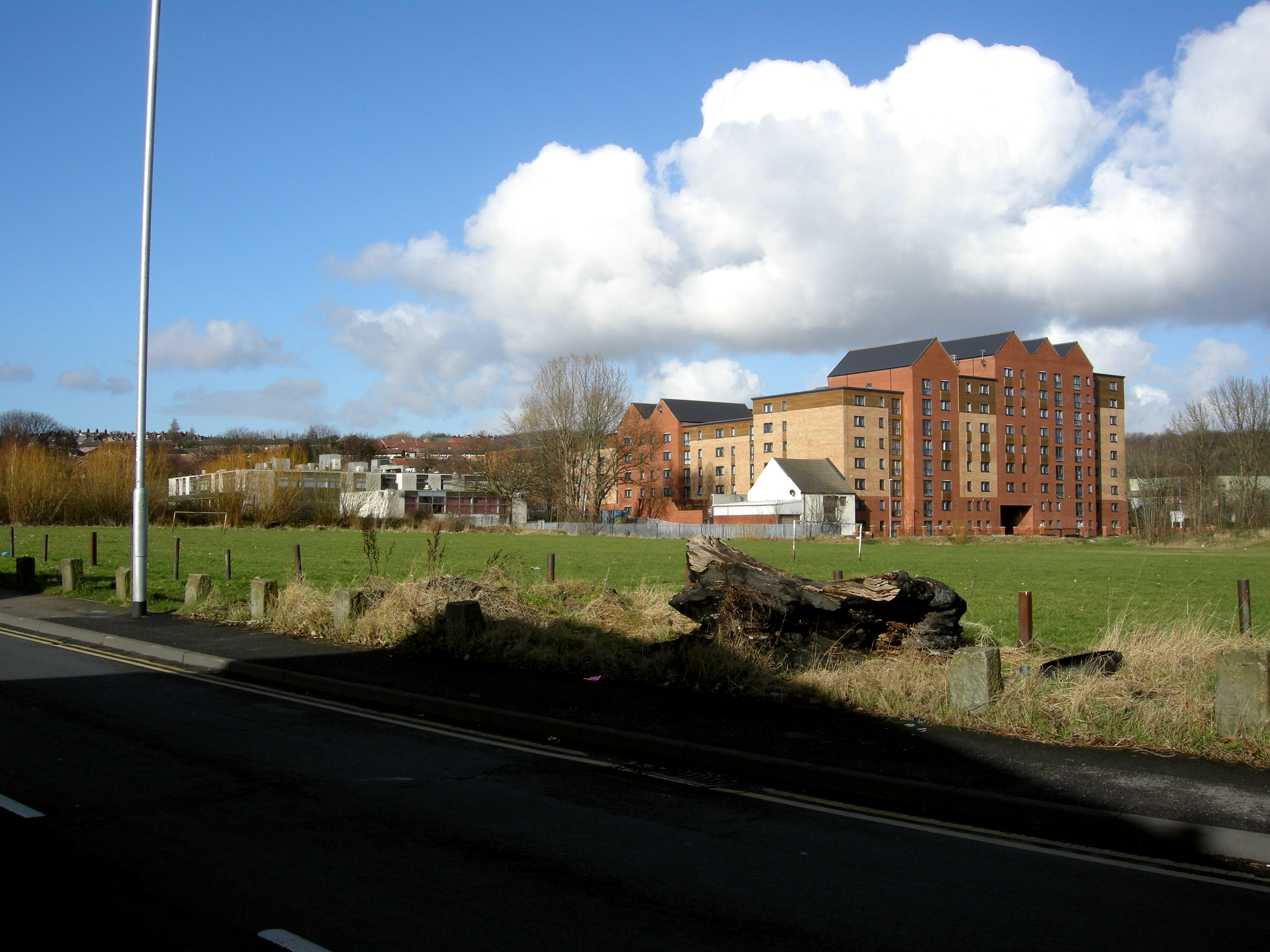
Former site of Clayfield Street, Leeds

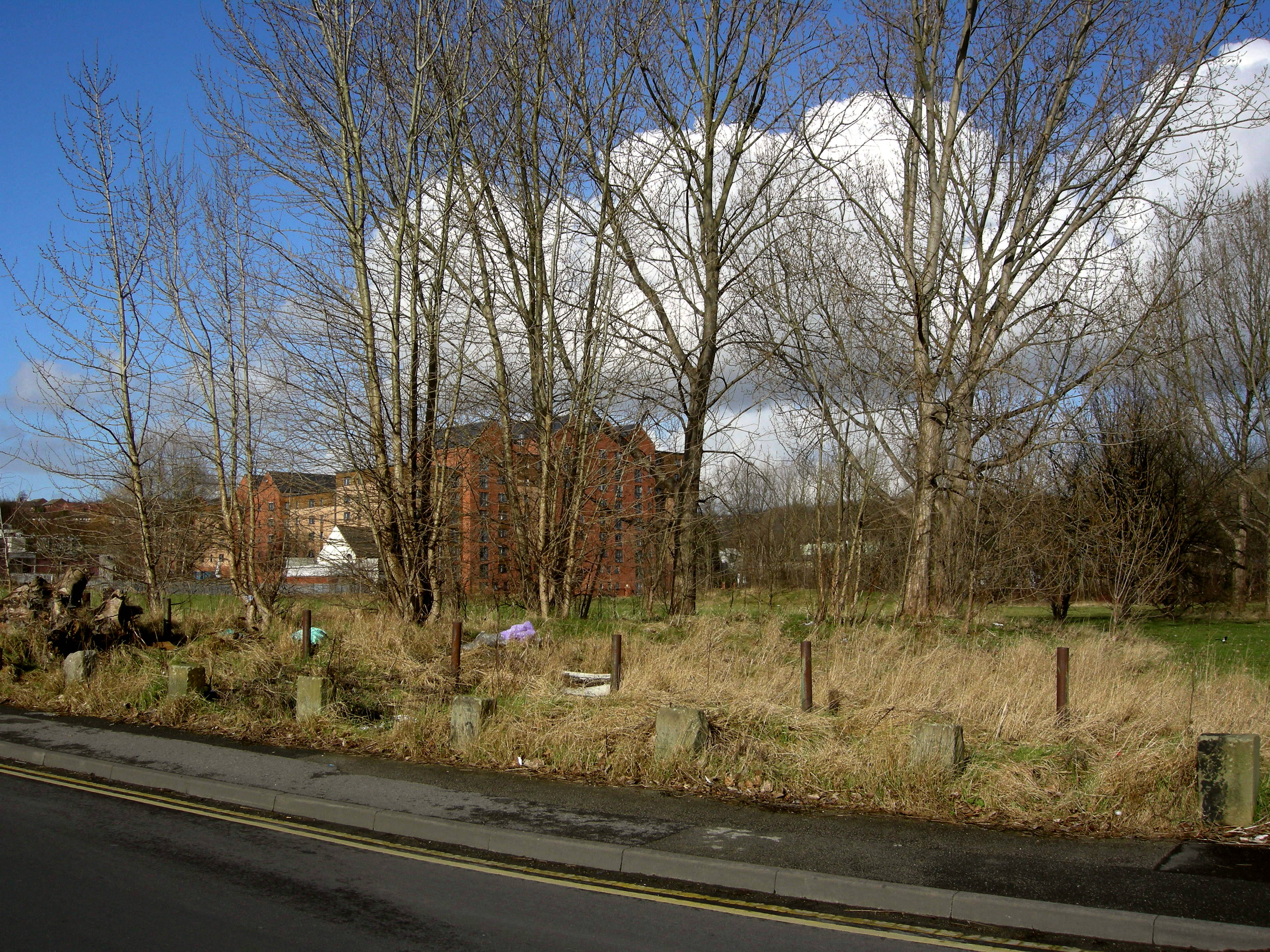
Former site of Stonefield Terrace, Leeds

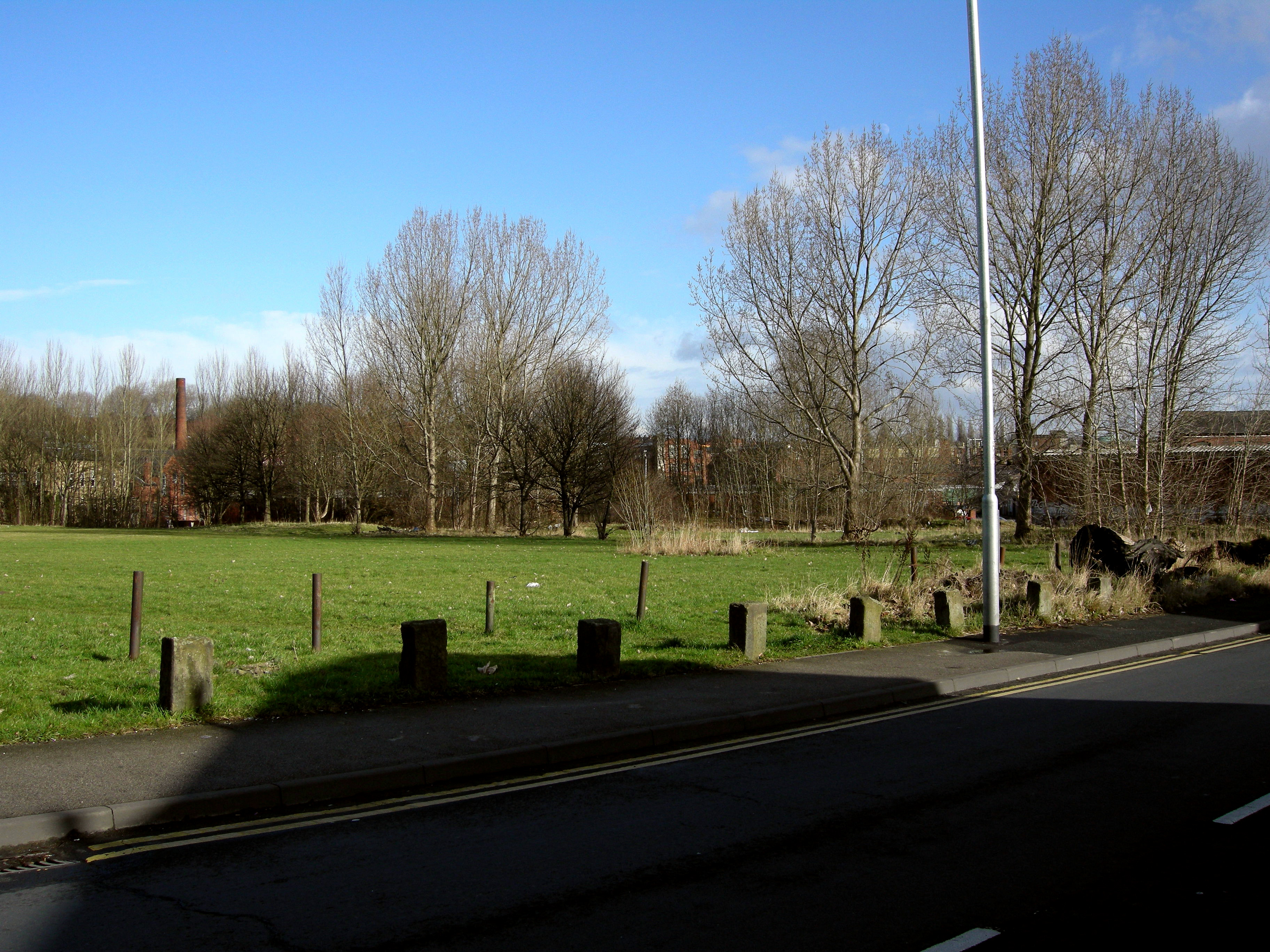
Sites of Clayfield Street and Stonefield Terrace, Leeds

The 1901 Census records W.M. Scott aged seven years with his parents and no siblings close to the tannery again at 20 Stonefield Terrace, in the All Souls parish of north Leeds, Yorkshire, and only four streets away from the Scotts' previous home in Clayfield Street. It was a four-room corner house in a back-to-back row on the corner with Cambridge Road. This was a street of back-to-back houses, but is now a row of trees on a playing field. In the 1911 Census he was aged 17 years, and he and his family had moved away from the tannery. He had no siblings and he was a lithographic artist apprentice, living with his parents in a back-to-back house at 49 Ganton Mount at Woodhouse, Leeds; the street is now rebuilt as modern houses. In 1911 his father was a journeyman joiner, and his mother a housewife. The 1911 census enumerator recorded that the house had eight rooms instead of the regular back-to-back four rooms, so number 49 must have been a larger corner house. Scott suffered from ill health during his youth. Initially he was not expected to survive beyond his seventh birthday, and he did not attend school regularly.

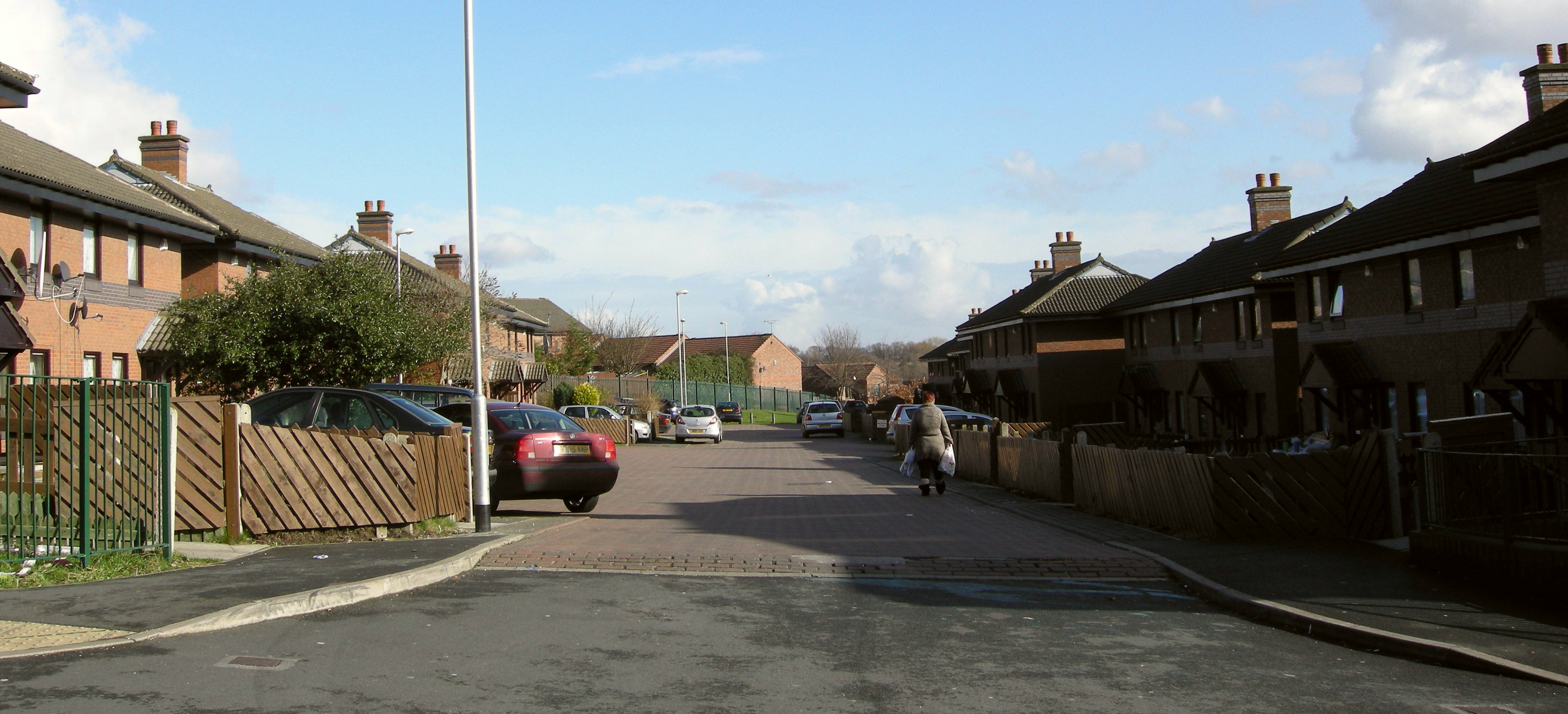
Site of the roadway of Ganton Mount

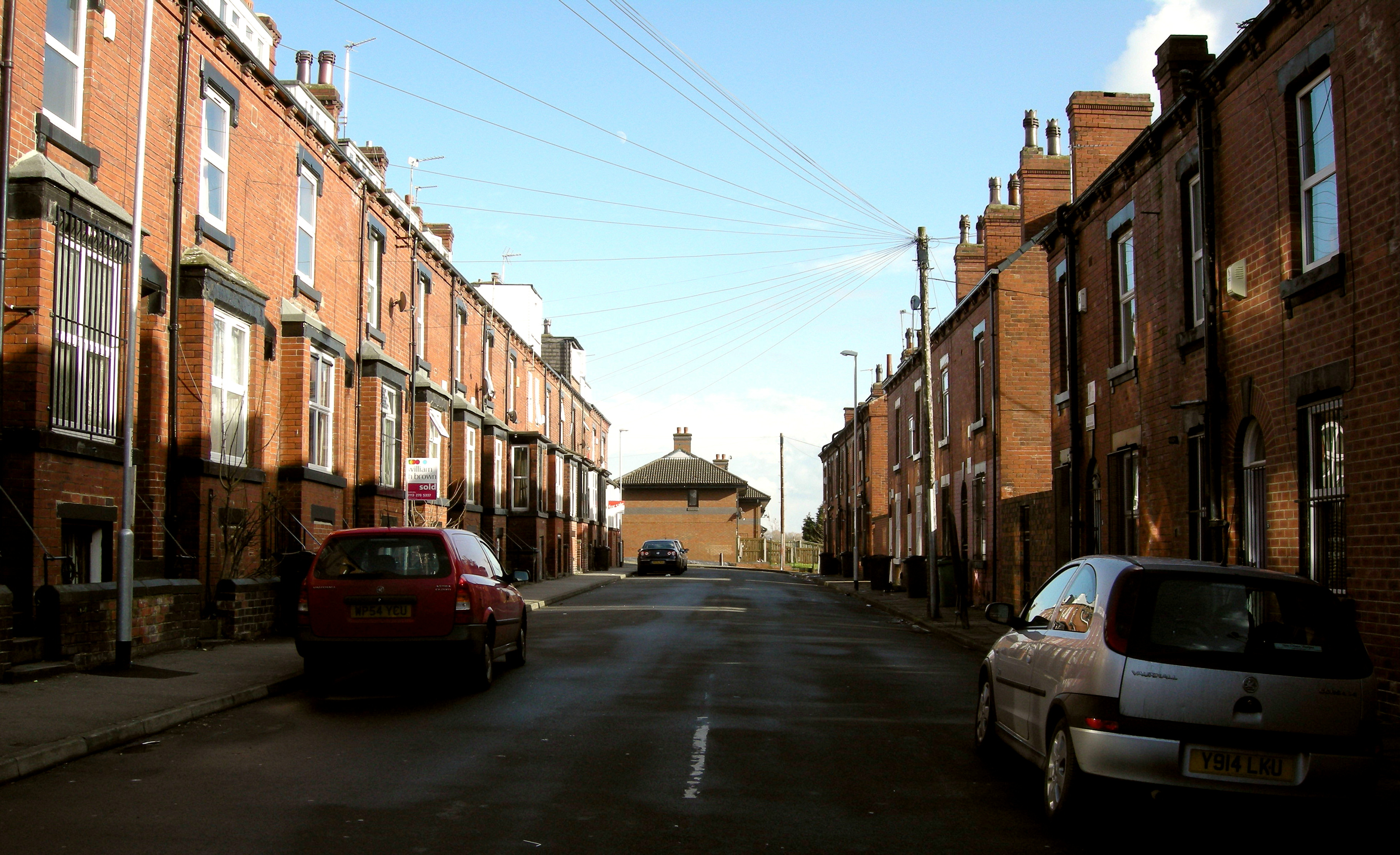
New houses on the site of Ganton Mount (centre distance)

=== Adult life ===
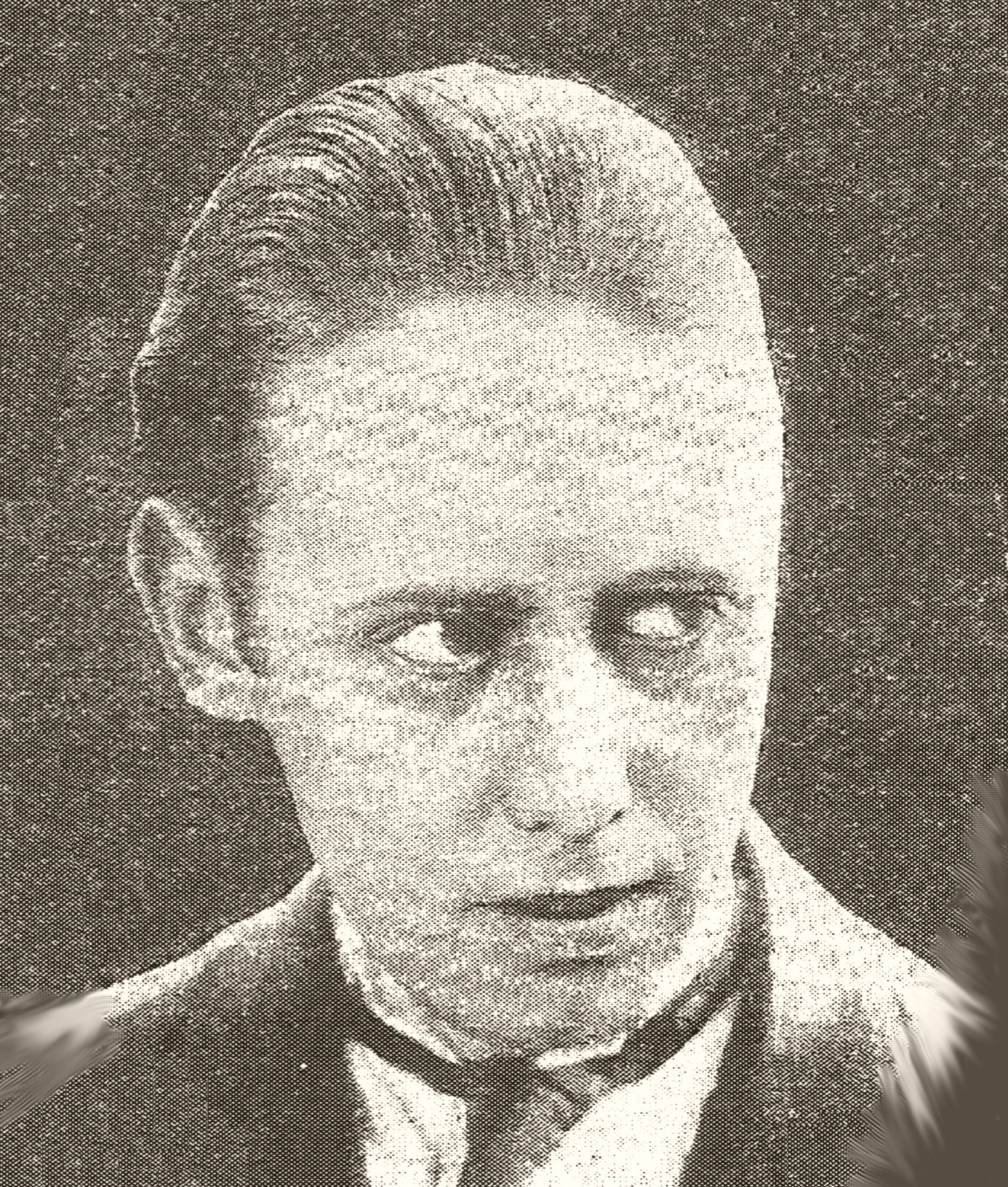
Scott, in 1921

Scott was unable to serve during the First World War due to poor health, and he was registered unfit for service. His health was graded C3, or permanently unfit for service, and although he was 6 feet tall, he weighed only 9 stone. In 1915 he married Lily Edmundson, (Note: Lily Scott née Edmundson (19 August 1891 – 1962). GRO index: Births Sep 1891 Edmundson Lily Leeds 9b 542. Marriages Jun 1915 Scott William M. and Edmundson Lily Leeds 9b 1165. Deaths Jun 1962 Scott Lily 70 Bridge 5b 58.) in Leeds Register Office; she was a tailoress and the daughter of George Edmundson, a machine fitter in 1891 and electrical engineer in 1915. Scott was at that time an artist and caricaturist, living at 79 Buslingthorpe Lane, Leeds; his mother was one of the witnesses at the wedding. Following the wedding, the couple moved to London where Scott became known as a caricaturist. However Scott was not in good health, having suspected tuberculosis by 1918. They had two daughters: the first was Patricia Shirley, born at 1 Highfield Terrace, Golders Green when Scott described himself as a black and white artist. (Note: Patricia Shirley Scott (b Hendon 28 September 1919). GRO index: Births Dec 1919 Scott Patricia S. Edmundson Hendon 3a 712.) The second was Marjory Sylvia, born at St Edwards maternity home, Station Road, Herne Bay. At this point Scott was describing himself as a journalist and living at Roldale House, Selsea Avenue, Herne Bay. (Note: Marjory Sylvia Scott (b Blean 4 January 1921). GRO index: Births Mar 1921 Scott Marjory S Edmundson Blean 2a 1802.)

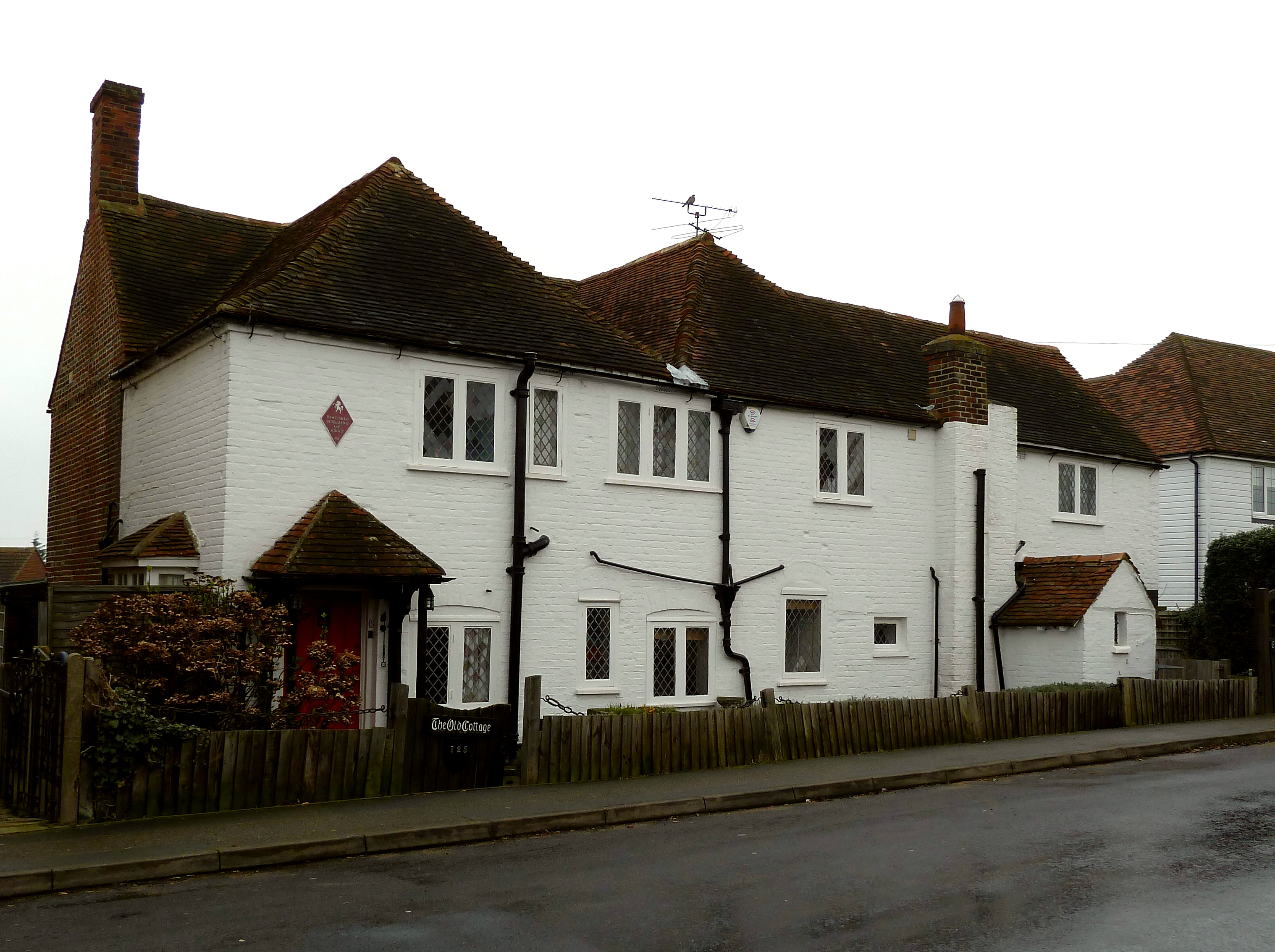
The Old Cottage

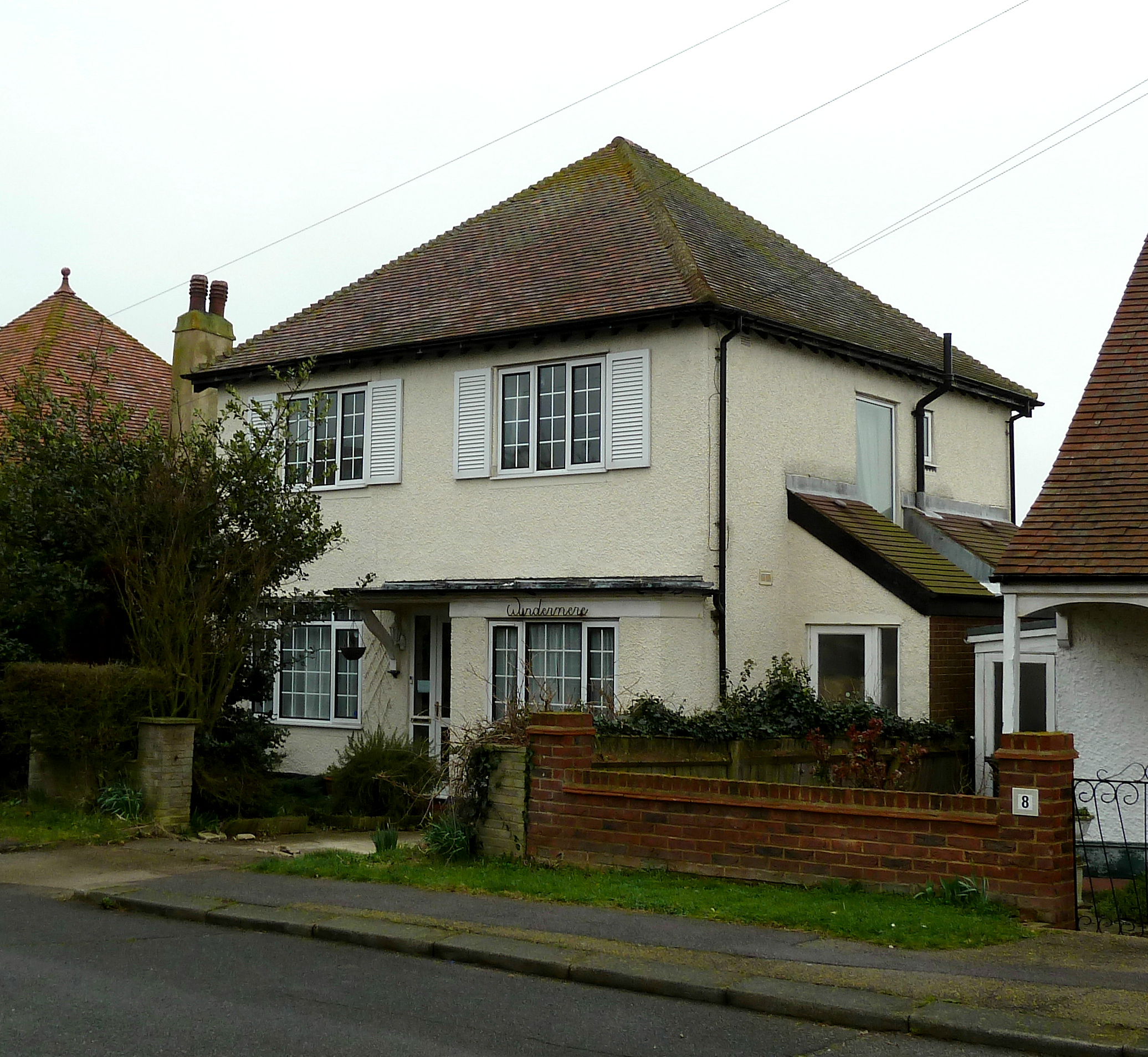
Windermere, where The Cherrys series was written

Rents were lower in Herne Bay than in London, and the air was less smoky there. Scott suffered from "precarious" health, so he became a resident of Herne Bay, Kent from August 1920, and was familiar with the area by 1925 when he published Disher, Detective, which has his detective's assistant discovering a black stamp washed up at Hampton. In 1928 he was at St Minver Cottage in Salisbury Drive. From 1929 to 1932 he was living at Crown Hill Cottage, West Cliff Drive. The actor, producer and Herne Bay resident Max Roma and Scott became friends, and they collaborated in amateur theatrical productions. From 1933 to 1935 he lived at The Old Cottage, a 17th-century listed building, at 125 Grand Drive. From 1935 to the end of his life, he lived with his wife at Windermere in High View Avenue, at the top of Westcliff overlooking Hampton-on-Sea. He was living there when he wrote Herne Bay Pageant in 1937, and all his children's books were written there from about 1951 to 1964. The surroundings of all his Kentish residences are reflected in the settings of his books: notably in Half-Term Trail, 1955, which was written at Windermere and is set in Herne Bay and Hampton. While he was living at Windermere he had grandchildren for whom he wrote The Cherrys series.

Scott was a "shy and private" person, said to have "shunned the limelight". However he contributed to the life of Herne Bay by directing its amateur dramatic society The Mask Players from 1930 to 1940. Steventon and Ford suggest that The Mask includes a veiled description of Scott, thus: "Thirty-five ... Clean-shaven. Horn-rimmed glasses. A successful author and poseur. A weakness for the limelight". However the latter "weakness" was his eagerness to sit in the wings in theatres and caricature the players, while at the same time shunning any spotlight on his own person. He wrote the 1939 Herne Bay Town Guide "in his own idiosyncratic way". He created an emblem for Herne Bay, showing its heron symbol, its clock tower, Reculver Towers and the sea. However the idyll of a holiday town far from London was interrupted by the Second World War. He was appointed as a fire point guard for his street, High View Avenue, and he wrote later that the town began to empty as residents left to serve their country.

Scott died of a stroke at Nunnery Fields Hospital, Canterbury, (Note: Nunnery Fields Hospital is now Kent and Canterbury Hospital.) on 7 May 1964; his death certificate describes him as a journalist. He was cremated at Barham Crematorium on 12 May 1964; his ashes were scattered in the grounds there, and there is no headstone or memorial. The Thoresby Society has commented that, "his only memorial is his work". In 1998 the Herne Bay Gazette said, "Mr Scott was a true citizen of Herne Bay who had not received due recognition".

== Career ==
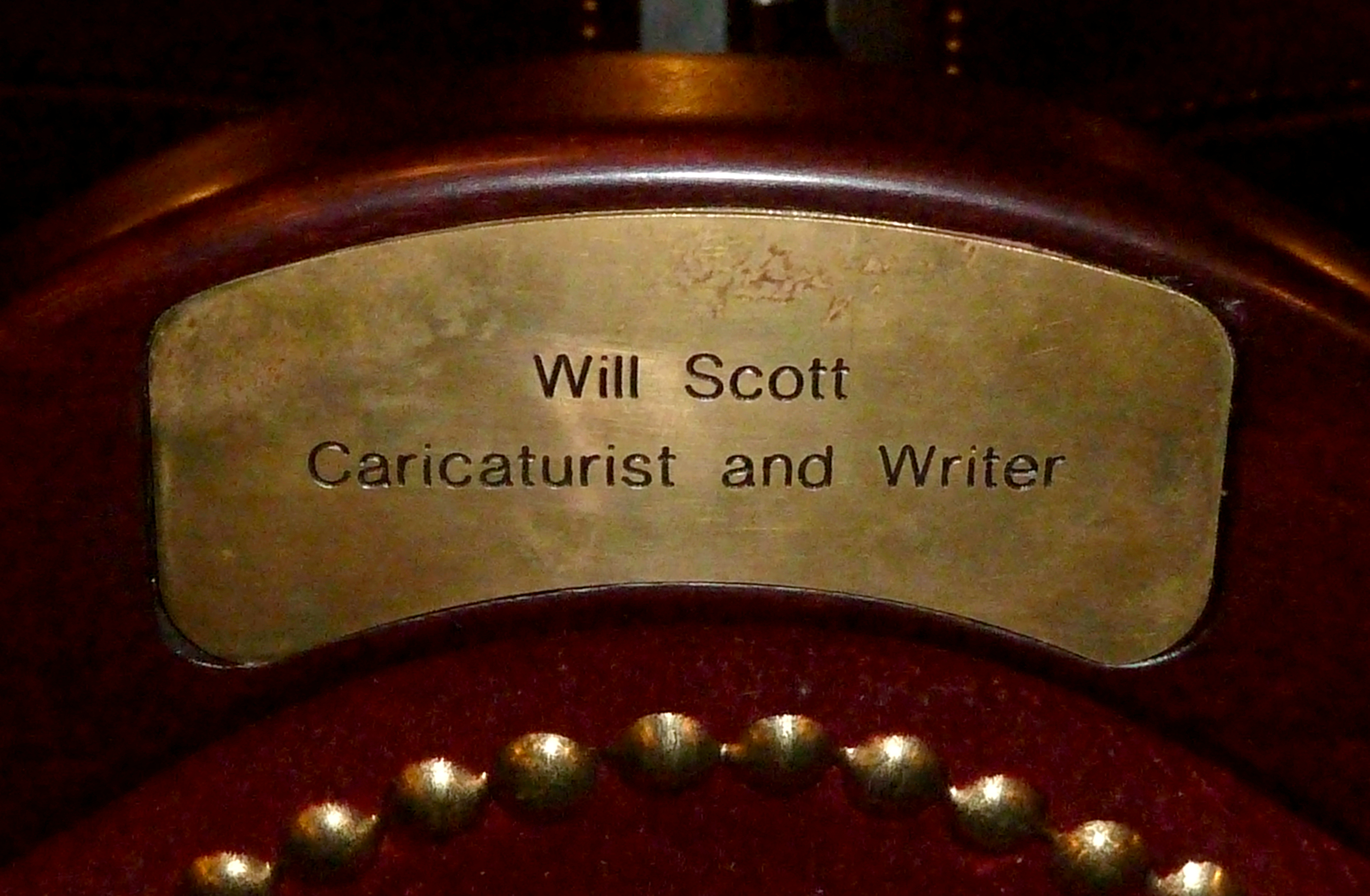
2011 dedication to Will Scott at Leeds City Varieties

It could be said that Scott's experiences of the art of entertainment and storytelling, when sneaking into theatres at age 10, was an early inspiration for his career. His drawing was influenced by theatrical posters, and by comics. He was only 14 years old when his first drawing was published. In due course the newspapers were using his work. According to Ford (2013), Scott is likely to have been an apprentice at Waddington's printing works in Leeds, and he designed posters there. His Times obituary says that he began in London as a caricaturist for the Performer magazine, drawing George Robey, Wilkie Bard, and Fred Kitchen from the film Old Mother Riley Overseas. However he was already working as a caricaturist in Leeds by 1915 when he was twenty-one, as shown on his marriage certificate. He was briefly the art editor of Pan magazine in London, but then moved to Herne Bay to become a full-time writer, while still describing himself as a journalist. The dust jacket of the first edition of The Cherrys series says:

After being a cartoonist, an art critic, an art editor and a drama critic, Will Scott settled down as a fiction writer. He has written over 2,000 short stories, which is believed to be a record for this country. When his own daughters were small he wrote plays and books, all for grown ups. It was grandchildren who turned his thoughts to books for young readers. He says they are 'the greatest fun in the world'.

In his various works Scott used several pseudonyms such as "Anthony Grey" and "Wensley Smith", besides his more regular "Will Scott".

== Herne Bay Guardian ==
Among his other activities Scott was continuing as a journalist, as he reported in the census. In the 1920s he and fellow journalist Jim Gurling co-published the Herne Bay Guardian (or H.B. Guardian), an "alternative weekly newspaper". This publication was intended as a balance to the content of the Herne Bay Press newspaper, and as a vehicle for certain local opinions or campaigns. One project carried by the H.B. Guardian was a plea for a new Pier Theatre as a replacement for the existing 1884 wooden Pier Theatre, which was now inadequate in comparison with other, larger, local theatres. In the event, the old Pier Theatre burned down in 1928, and the H.B. Guardian supported a plan for a new theatre in the existing Pier Pavilion. However that plan failed, and the newspaper closed around 1929.

== Artworks ==
Among his other skills, Scott was a published caricaturist, and he created Herne Bay's emblem, including symbols of a heron, the sea, and the town's clock tower. For the 5th edition of Millgate's Handbook to Reculver, he designed its cover, and drew a vignette of the landmark for its title page.

== Mask Players (The) ==
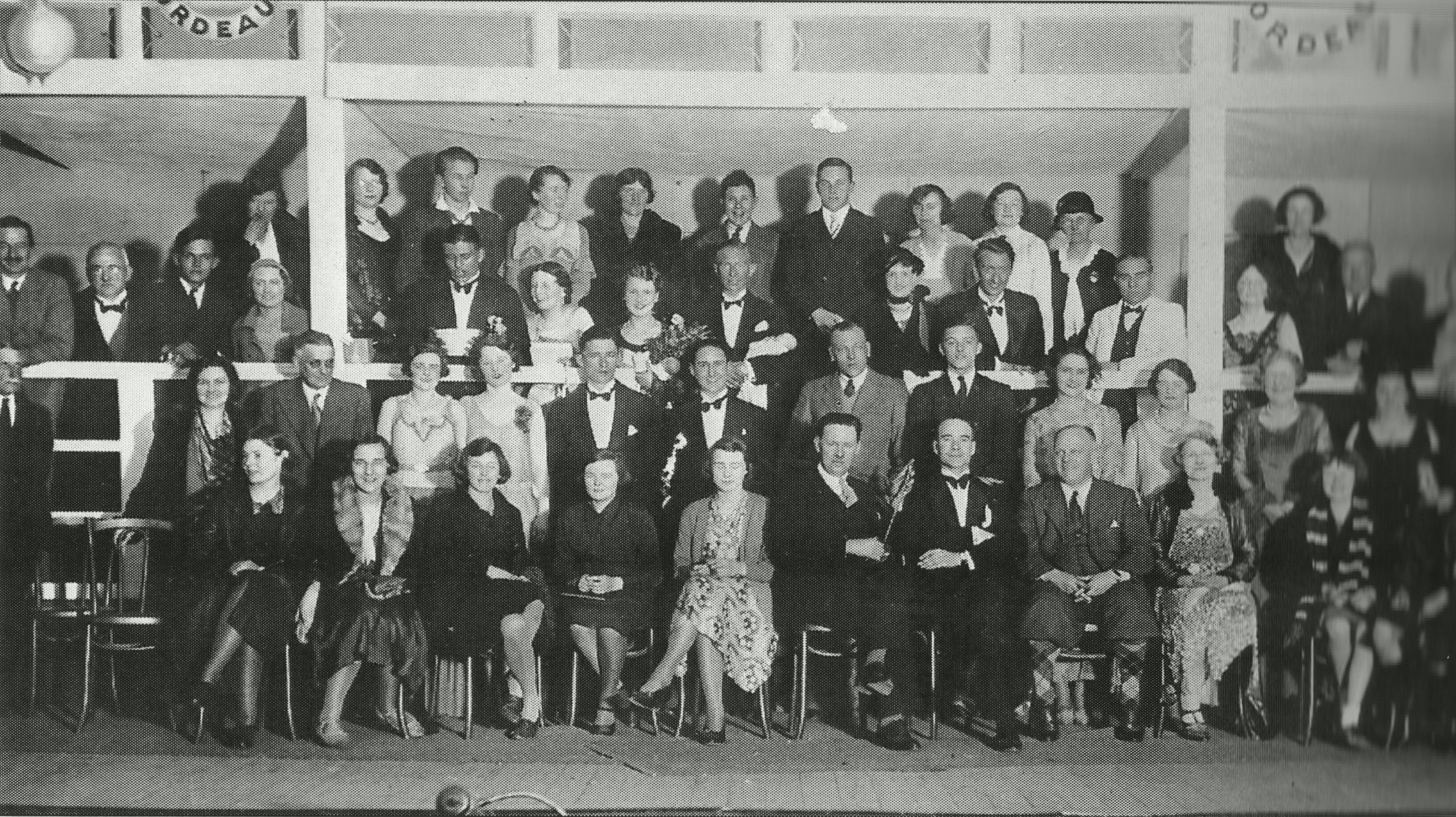
The Mask Players, with Scott seated, 6th from front left

The Mask Players was the amateur Herne Bay drama group started for charity purposes by Edward Anstee in March 1930, with twelve or twenty-four founder members; this number had risen to 300 by 1935. Between 1930 and 1940, 673 people had contributed to the group and 176 acting members had taken part in 179 performances and two thousand rehearsals. There was a monthly show called "Green Room Night". Will Scott was involved with this society as director – and occasionally script-writer, set-designer and producer – for most of its life. The group celebrated its tenth anniversary and 63rd green room night on 28 March 1940 at St John's Hall in Herne Bay, although the previous cast of hundreds had been whittled down to dozens by the war. On this occasion the entertainment consisted of variety sketches and turns, including and accompanied by "a breezy pianoforte selection". It also included a rare speech by Scott, who was known to "shun the limelight".

The group was named after Scott's play, The Mask, its first play which opened on 28 March 1930 at the King's Hall and produced a £42 donation for a local charity. The Players regularly performed yearly Christmas pantomimes, the early ones starring a disguised Eileen Wilson as principal boy. It also functioned as a social club for the players, with garden parties at Beltinge. For the Mask Players during the 1936 centenary of the laying of the foundation stone of Herne Bay Clock Tower, Scott wrote a play called A Window in William Street. His fictional plot followed the quarrels, and eventual storming out, of family members who had originally lined up at a window in 1836 to watch the clock tower's ceremonial procession. The end of the play shows only the housemaid remaining to enjoy the celebrations from the window. Scott later wrote that the play was: "about as simple as a play could be, but it was so real to everybody concerned in 1936. And it wasn't the years between now and 1936 that vanished when I read the forgotten pages again ... It was the years between 1936 and 1836. That is how real it was to us". Scott recognised that the lives of seaside residents continued after the summer season ended. He said later: "The season for [the Mask Players] began when September was near its end, then that other Season was over and the coloured lights twinkled no more. Then the bazaar places and the rock shops were shut up and dark. Then there was room for us. Then we could begin". The Players continued to entertain at least until 1940, although other entertainment societies had to close; for example The Mask Players Girls performed a variety concert in aid of a wartime charity at St Johns Hall on 31 October 1940, charging 6d entry fee. By 1945 The Mask Players had disbanded due to war operations, and the group was succeeded by Theatrecraft. At the same time, Scott was a member of a Whitstable amateur troupe, the Lindley Players.

== Short stories ==
According to Jack Adrian: (Note: Christopher Lowder (born 1945), known as Jack Adrian, is the author of the Deathlands serices..)

Will Scott ... was an incorrigible scribbler for the downmarket weeklies and a master of the twelve-hundred-word comic skietch. Hardly a week went by, during the 1920s, without something by him appearing in the Humorist or Passing Show ... His slicker work he sold to the smart and glossy society journals like The Sketch, The Tatler and The Sphere.

Scott's first short story, "Untold Gold" was published in Pan magazine, where he had once been the art editor, in October 1920. In 1923, Quality Films adapted it as a silent film directed by George A. Cooper, and titled it, The Man Who Liked Lemons. Scott wrote over 2,000 stories; he specialised in the short, short story and contributed many of these to the magazines Pan, The Performer, 20-Story, The Passing Show, John Bull, Illustrated, Everybody's Magazine, John O' London's Weekly, London Opinion, The Humorist, Ellery Queen's Mystery Magazine and The Star as well as The Strand Magazine and The Evening News, to which he contributed 94 stories. One of his short stories published in The Strand was "Not Guilty". In his introduction to this story, Jack Adrian says:

"Scott broke into The Strand in 1934, thereafter selling the magazine nearly thirty stories over the next dozen years, most of which display the confident precision of the craftsman; not a few, like "Not Guilty", have an amoral tinge to them which lifts them wholly out of the ruck".

Scott's stories were also published in summer and Christmas annuals. The short, short stories tend to rely for effect on the audience's expectation being trumped by a clever twist at the end. Although the short stories are long out of print, one by Will Scott was reprinted in 1992, in The Folio Anthology of Humour, this being a reprint of a P.G. Wodehouse's A Century of Humour collections of 1935 and 1936. For John Bull, Scott devised a short story called Thirty Years Later (1940), about former lovers who meet again after thirty years, a theme not unlike that of the 1939 wartime song, We'll Meet Again, even though neither the story nor the song directly references war. Two days after Scott died, Geoffrey Williamson wrote in The Times:

[Scott was] a master of the short story ... his style was distinctive, expecially notable for enomomy of expression and pleasing flashes of incisive and discerning wit. If he had O. Henry's fertility of invention, he also possessed some of Saki's gift of brevity and more than a dash of Chesterton's love of paradox and the bizarre ... His favoured themes were those based on human vagaries, amusing quirks of character and those odd, chance encounters which give a spice to everyday life.

By the late 1930s, Scott had a regular column in the Daily Herald, "then Britain's biggest selling newspaper", according to the Thoresby Society.

=== Daily Express Cameo Tale series ===
The ninth story in the series was Will Scott's Old Bus, which appeared on 30 September 1930: a shaggy dog tale about twenty years in the life of a limousine. It is set in London, and in a fictional Sunnysands which may have been suggested by Herne Bay.

=== Passing Show (The) Magazine ===
Where Men Are Men (1926) is a humorous tale about a henpecked husband. The Fingerprint (1926) is a detective story about an unsolved crime where the evidence consists of unusually large thumbprints. The Ten Year Smile (1927) is a murder mystery in which a felon explains why he is pleased with himself. Scott devised a series of train-journey mysteries for this publisher, seeing them in print in 1938. The plots are set on the 9.15 a.m. commuter train of the 1930s which "rolls its way up to London, as it has done for years ... it rolls through the blossoming orchards in the springtime, the harvests in the autumn; in the summer through the ripening fields; in the winter, for part of the time at least, in the dark". A small part of this idyll can still be glimpsed occasionally from the Herne Bay–Victoria train window.

=== Giglamps (1924) ===
In the title story of this collection of tales the detective is a tramp. The British Library holds a reference copy.

== Plays and films ==
Scott wrote comedies and thrillers for the stage. It has been said that "his real love was the theatre". He wrote and directed his first film, a silent comedy, in 1919.

=== The Mask, performed 1930 ===
It is not clear whether this play was a development of his novel, The Mask (1929), or vice versa. It was the first play performed by The Mask Players at Herne Bay in 1930.

=== The Limping Man, filmed 1931 and 1936 ===
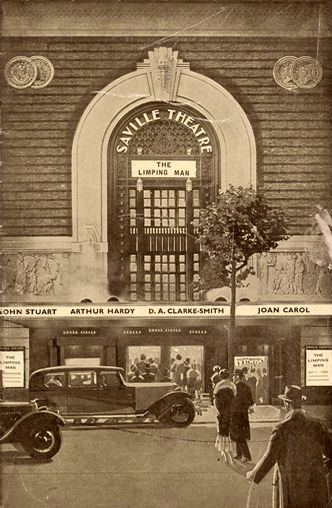
The Limping Man at the Saville Theatre 1936

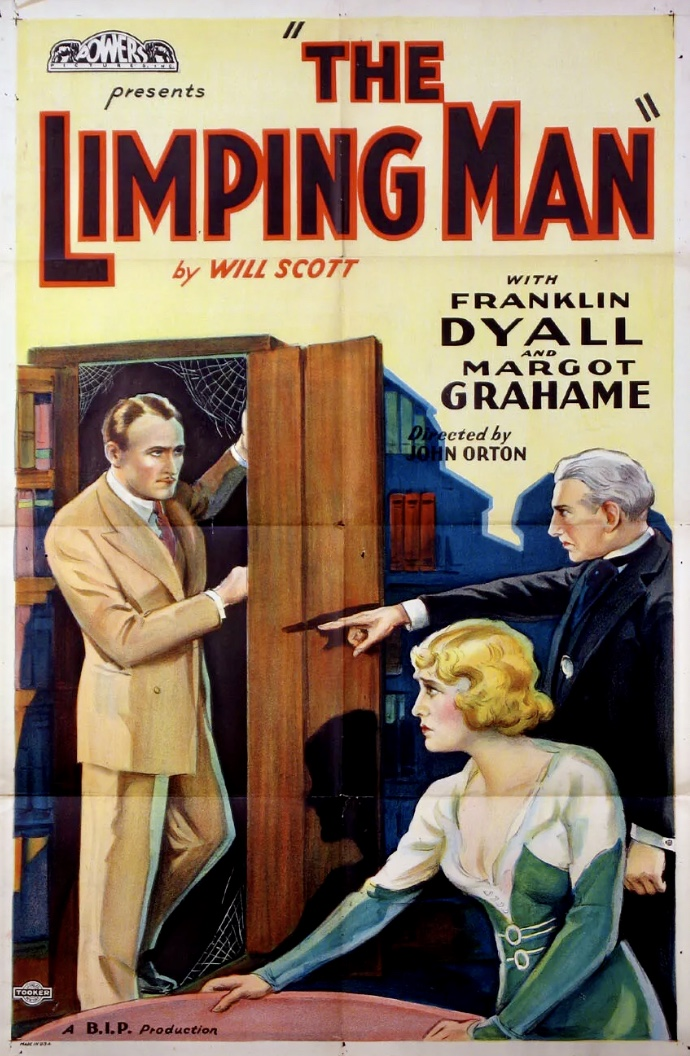
Poster for The Limping Man stage play, 1931

Will Scott's thriller drama, The Limping Man was called an "outstanding success", the character of Disher being expanded onstage by Franklin Dyall. The plot begins with a man suffering victimisation after inheriting an estate, and enlisting a detective to find out why. This play was a development of Scott's 1928 novel, Shadows. The play was revived onstage and made into two films: Creeping Shadows (1931), and The Limping Man (1936). The 1931 film was promoted as "Even more thrilling than Bram Stoker and Edgar Alan Poe", and as "another Dracula". This is not the same story as Frances D. Grierson's The Limping Man (1924). The play went on tour and then debuted in London on Monday 19 January 1931 at the Royalty Theatre, starring Franklin Dyall, Eve Gray, Miriam Lewes and Arthur Hardy. It was copyrighted in the same year as a play in three acts in the United States. The Times review was printed the following day. The Daily Express review said:

"Will Scott, an artist and author, has written in The Limping Man a comedy thriller which is far above the average if only for the reason that it contains at least a score of very amusing lines. There is a valuable Rembrandt, a Henry VIII mansion, mysterious footsteps, a bell that rings by itself, a suspicious-looking butler, Americans, a man murdered at the crossroads – all sorts of ingredients that would mix up into a stage mystery. The solution is by no means an obvious one. Franklin Dyall is a modern man of mystery – a being who wanders all over the globe solving crimes that baffle every one else. Arthur Hardy, who has been acting in this play on tour for some months, has some admirable lines as a fashionable physician . . . If The Limping Man had been produced two years ago I should have promised it a long run".

In 1935 The Limping Man was at the Phoenix Theatre; by 1936 the play was at the Saville Theatre, and produced by Arthur Hardy.

=== His Wife's Mother, filmed 1932 ===
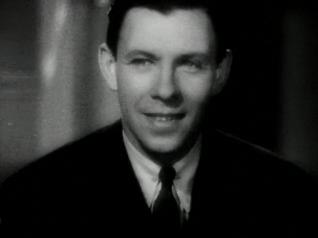
George Murphy in London by Night, 1937

This stage play was filmed as His Wife's Mother (1932). The plot is a comedy in which a man pretends to be his own double when he is seen with an actress by his mother-in-law. It was an adaptation of one of his plays, The Queer Fish.

=== The Umbrella Man, filmed 1937 ===
This stage play was filmed as London by Night (1937); an atmospheric thriller in which a series of murders occurs in a foggy London square. However the plot of the film may differ from the original play, which is a comedy about crooks with jewellery hidden in an umbrella. Scott always kept a low profile at the advance screenings, sometimes putting himself at disadvantage thereby. On one occasion at the Apollo Theatre, Scott was challenged by the theatre manager to give his identity backstage and mid-performance.

=== Herne Bay Pageant, 1937 ===
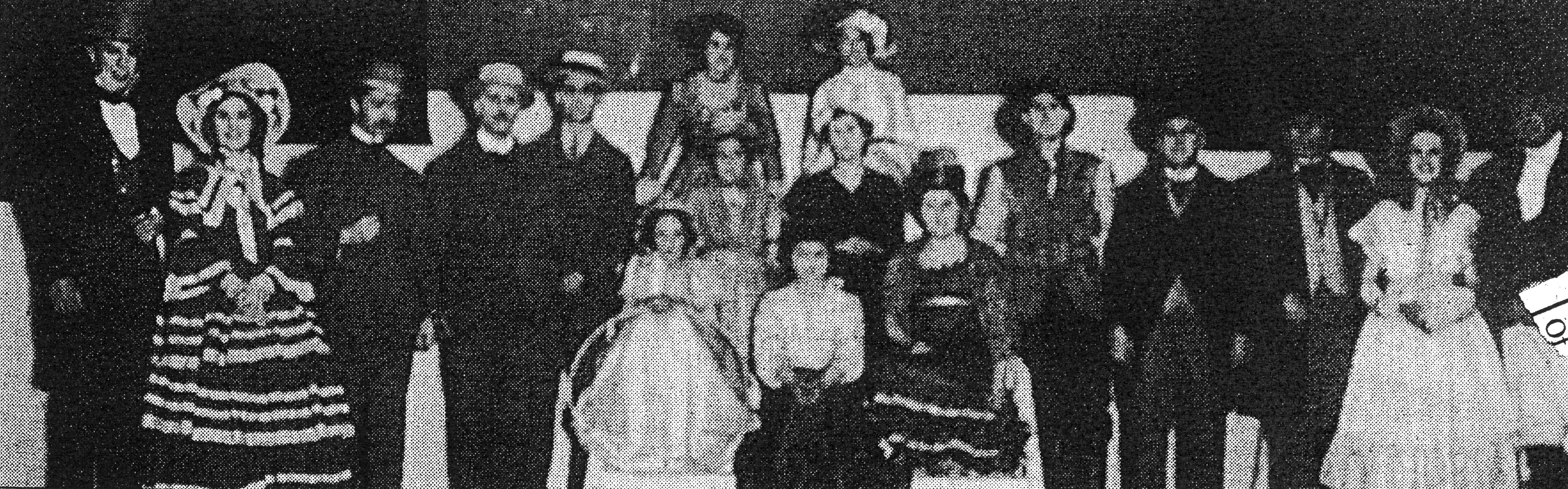
Some participants in the pageant

This is The Herne Bay Pageant in Celebration of the Coronation of their Majesties King George V1 and Queen Elizabeth which took place in the Pier Pavilion with a large cast, and was written and directed by Will Scott for performance in Herne Bay on 13 and 14 May 1937. It consisted of an introduction and six single-scene episodes showing how the town celebrated previous coronations and events. Each episode represented eras of Herne Bay's history: 1821, 1831, 1838, 1902, 1911 and 1937. The event featured small, local, real and fictional events, within that framework. For example the 1911 episode mentioned fields laid out for development on Westcliff. Some of the scenes were humorous: for example the 1838 episode included a light mockery of reactionary attitudes, showing an elderly resident worrying that the new clock tower was déclassé. The 1937 episode included a parade of individuals carrying placards representing all the institutions, groups and societies of Herne Bay. The entire pageant promoted pride in Herne Bay through understanding of its development from a fishing village to a complex town and tourist attraction. Lawrence Noble, who took part in the pageant in 1937, recalled in 1998: "He was a shy and modest man. He wrote the pageant script, directed, assembled the cast and humoured and persuaded all the disparate elements. Will Scott loved Herne Bay".

=== Married for Money, 1939 ===
Scott's farce Married for Money appeared at the Aldwych Theatre in late 1939, during the early months of the Second World War, with a cast that included Nora Swinburne and Dinah Sheridan.

== Novels ==
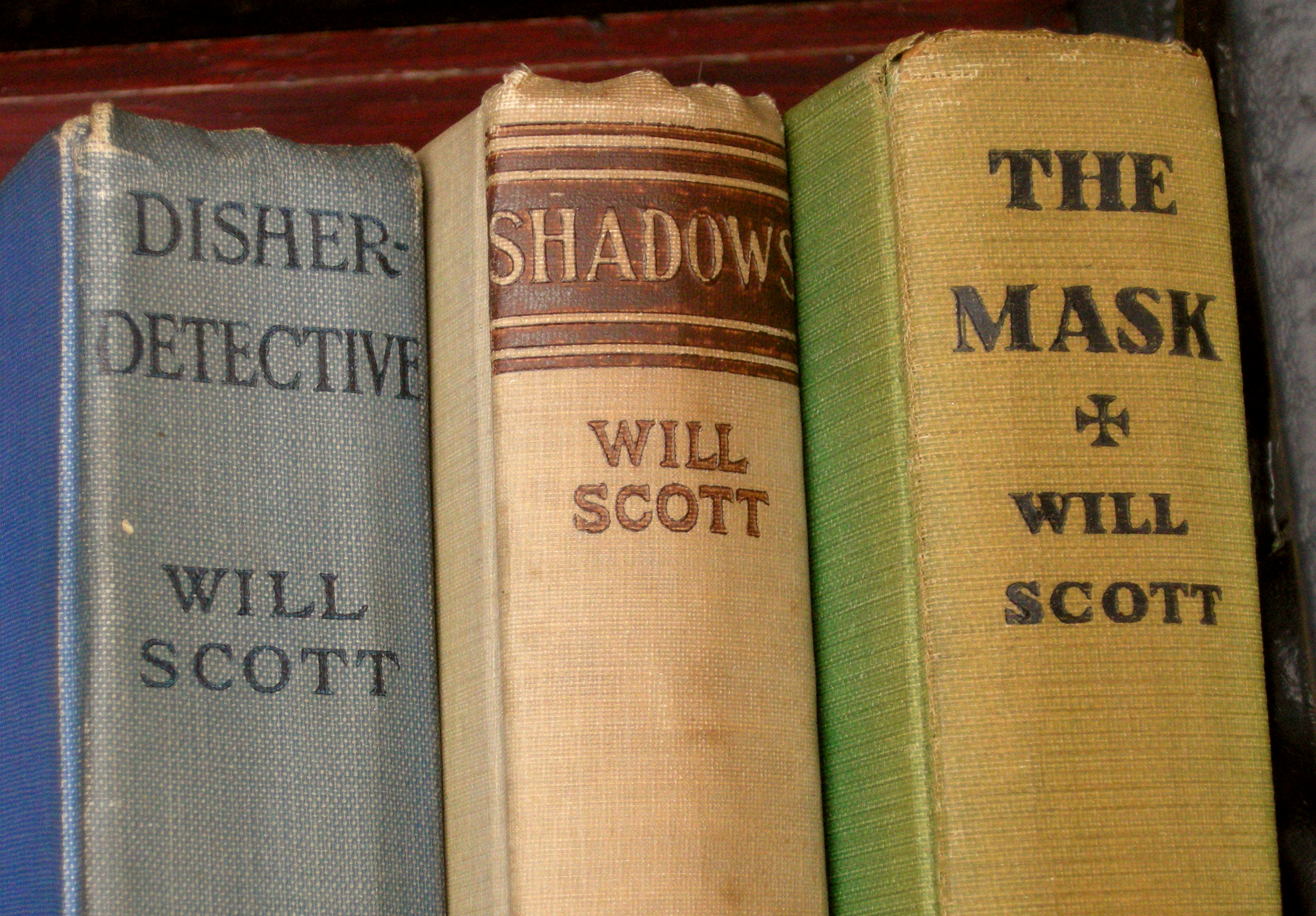
Disher, Detective, Shadows and The Mask

According to Steventon and Ford (2013), some reviewers compared Scott's fiction with the works of Saki, G. K. Chesterton and O. Henry.

=== Disher, Detective (1925) or The Black Stamp (1926) ===
Disher, Detective was the UK title. This book is dedicated to "my friend Albert Bailey". Two editions of The Black Stamp were produced in the United States in 1926. The book retailed at 7s 6d in the UK, and The Sunday Times review of May 1925 said: "The reader will be unusually thrilled by Mr Scott's brilliantly conceived story – really a little masterpiece of ingenuity". This is the first of three novels by Scott in which the hero is Disher: a fat and lazy detective who is given to spouting witty aphorisms on the subject of contemporary society. The setting of the plot ranges from Seasalter with its neighbouring north Kent coastal towns and the Isle of Sheppey, via London and New York to Canterbury and Blean Woods and back again to Seasalter. The story begins with the classic scenario of the locked room mystery, and moves thence to the morality of worldwide contemporary politics. However, before the tale is halfway through, Scott puts into the mouth of his detective a suggestion that the tight detective fiction genre of clues, detection and denouement is already exhausted by 1925:

"Heaven is the place where the last chapter will be torn out of the finest story that ever will be written. And it is a heaven to me unattainable. Believe me, I never want to solve any of these so-called mysteries with which my name is associated. But I always do solve them. I can't help it. The greatest thing that my present career could hold for me would be a case that was utterly beyond my powers . . . if there were someone else who could do my job as well as I can do it, I'd drop it at once and go in for some inexact science that leads to nowhere and nothing. But there isn't".

=== Shadows (1928) ===
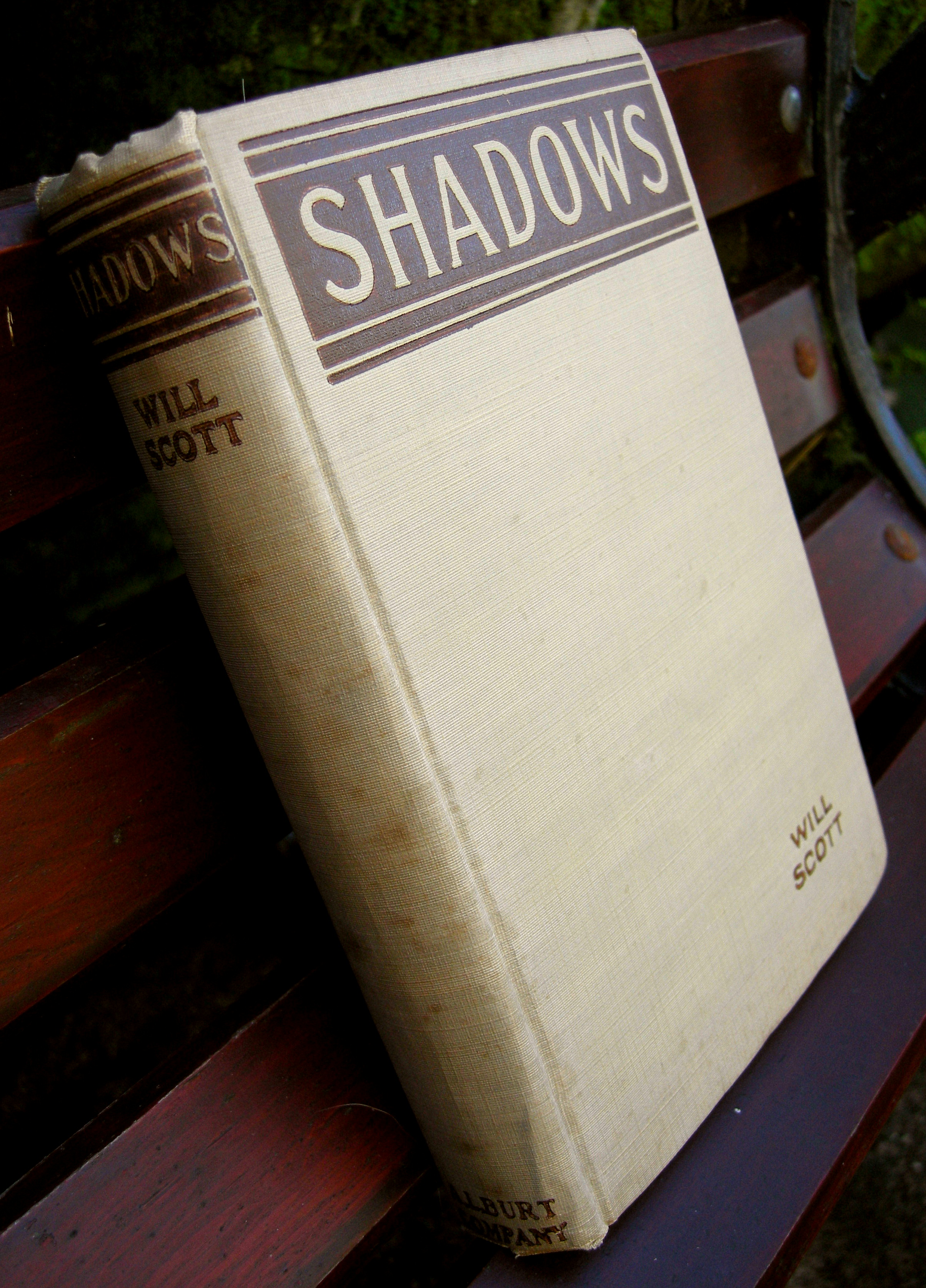
Shadows, 1928

The 1928 Philadelphia edition is dedicated to "my friend W.A. Williamson, Skipper of the Good Ship Passing Show of London, who, also, thinks an Adventure in the Armchair is worth two in the Bush". Five editions were published 1928–1931 in English and German. The British Library holds two reference copies. The 1928 dust jacket is illustrated in art deco style. It shows a bright orange silhouette of the haunted house on a hill against a grey sky with full moon, and below it are black shadows of trees on the base of the hill. At the top and bottom of this picture it says: "Disher solves another mystery / Shadows / by Will Scott / author of The Black Stamp". The dustjacket illustrates the fictional setting of the book at a grand and ancient house on a hill, called Tinker's Revel, described on page 12:

"the Revel on its hill. . . Against a background of tall black trees the Revel stood up, a brilliant red silhouette, a haphazard collection of corners and gables and curly chimney-pots and stepped terraces ..."

This location may have been suggested by Castle Hill in Kent. The novel is a mystery melodrama featuring the detective Disher and written almost in the form of a screenplay or stage play. Most of the characterisation and plot stem from the conversation, the description of the setting and the characters' movements which could be read as stage directions. As in a stage melodrama, almost all of the action takes place in one room, although there are one or two brief garden scenes. At the novel's dénouement on page 294 is possibly one of the earliest usages of the word, "happenings", employed loosely in the sense of prearranged events, here compared with the scandalous plays of the Naughty Nineties: "These aren't the happenings for an old man to be dropped into. I got past this kind of thing in the 'nineties!"

=== The Mask (1929) ===
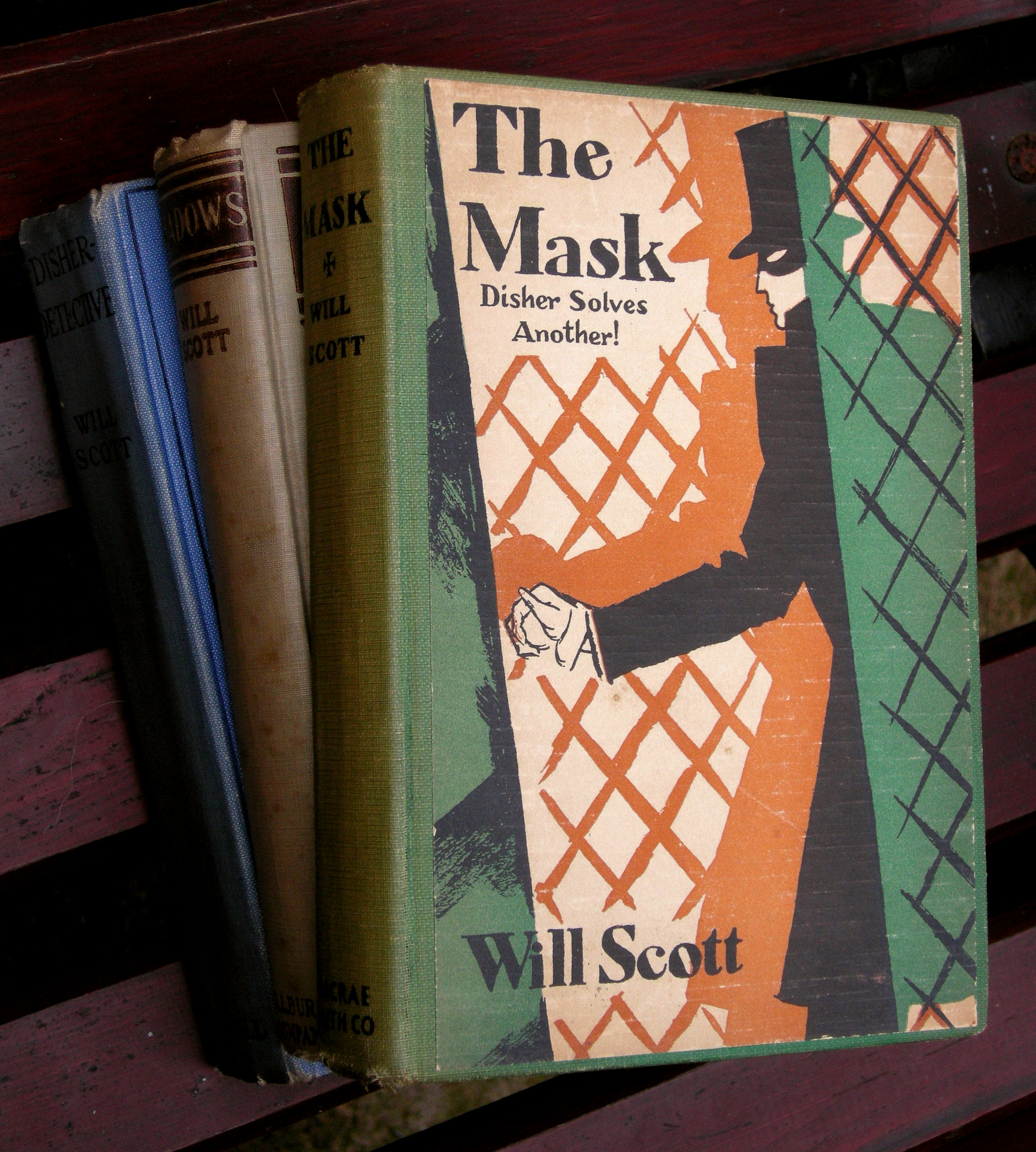
The Mask

Three editions were published 1929–1931 in English and German. The British Library holds a reference copy. In this whodunit novel, private detective Will Disher is described as suave, plump, astute and bored, but Scotland Yard still asks him for help in solving the mystery. The plot begins with the masked-murderer scenario, this one being a toff in evening dress. Much of the plot takes place in an English country house, and some of it is set in London, but the general setting is the marshland just south of Herne Bay and Birchington in Kent. Real local place names such as Maypole, Whitstable and Stodmarsh are transmuted into fictional places with names such as the Hope Poles Inn, Winstonlea and Stodmere Farm, and a chase through countryside at night evokes the true atmosphere of the marshes around the rivers Stour and Wantsum with their dykes or banked drainage trenches, twisting lanes and dark woods.

However this novel also offers glimpses of the area just before the beginning of the Great Depression when many local farmers and innkeepers went bankrupt and their land was sold for very little to itinerant farm labourers, as happened at Shelvingford and Marshside. The character Wilks the farmer with his Kentish dialect could be taken to represent the existing peasantry in the area, as a contrast with the upper class in the novel's Georgian House. However it may be that Scott identifies with this character. The author's roots are after all in a poor suburb of Leeds; he began life speaking a Loiner dialect; as a writer he identified with the observing-neighbour character Wilks in his Cherrys series, saying that "Wilks" was a half-synonym for the beginning of "Will Sc-ott". In 1925 Scott and his publisher Cassell were successfully sued by a reader who identified himself with a character and place in the Black Stamp novel. After that, Scott became more careful in his use of local names and places.

There are moments in The Mask which capture this landscape just as it was changing from that of the horse to that of the motor car. The farmer Wilks still has a horse and cart. However the taxi driver was a ploughman fifteen years before, and the local smithy is now a garage and petrol station. The bus, the train and walking are still preferred methods of travel for the majority, though, and even the car-owning gentry at the Georgian House are familiar with public transport timetables.

=== Clues (1929) ===
This is a puzzle-plot mystery. The British Library holds no reference copy of this novel, but it does hold an American anthology of detective stories called Clues.

=== The Man (1930) ===
A novel of 287 pages, published by Stanley Paul of London, 1930. The British Library holds a reference copy.

== Children's books: The Cherrys series ==
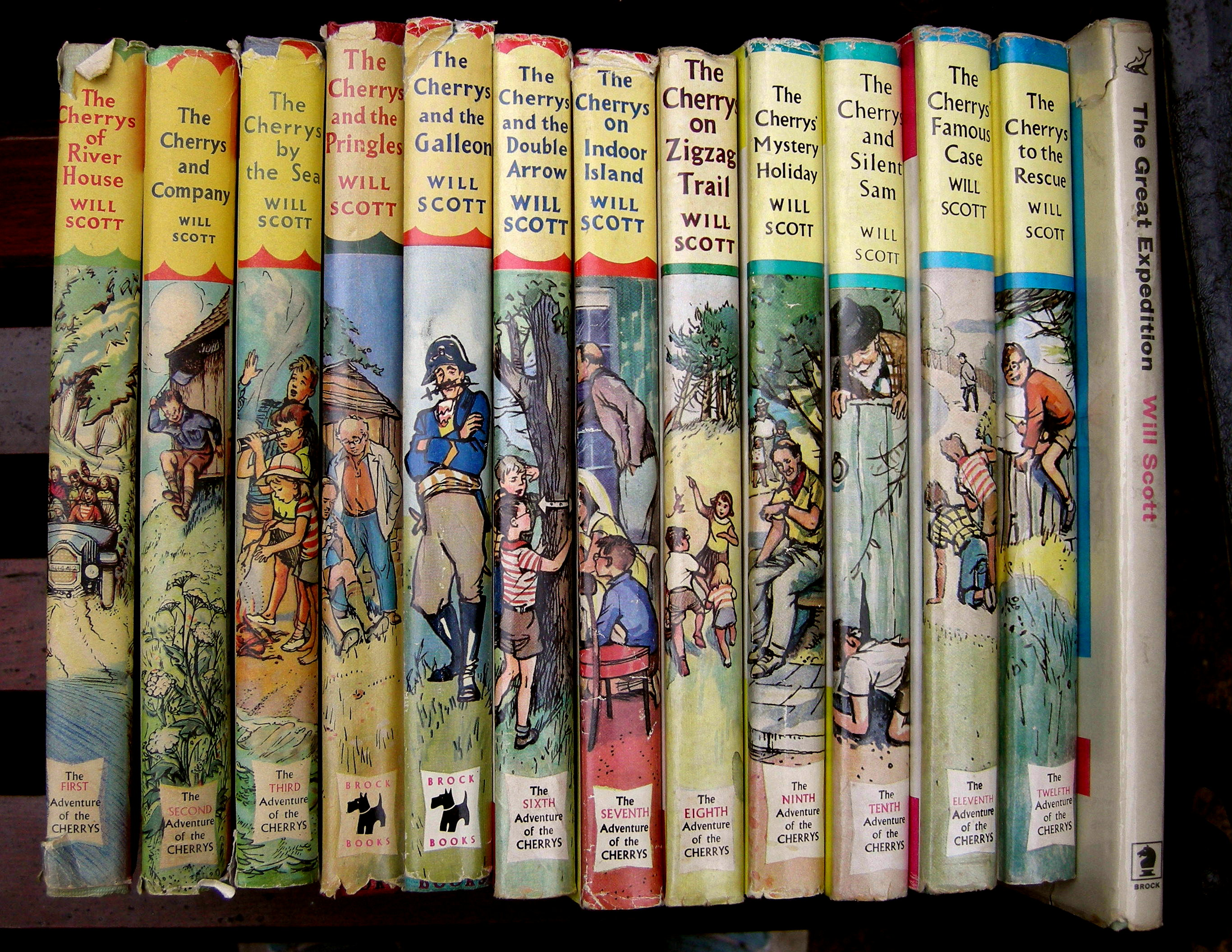
The Cherrys series

Scott had three main motives for beginning to write his first children's books in 1950. Although he was still publishing short stories, some of his target magazines had closed. He had become a grandfather, but there was a third motive. He said he was "driven to write children's books by my grandchildren, but ... I wrote them to please myself. I wrote the kind of children's books that I knew I would like to read". Although the Cherry books sport an atmosphere of family fun, Scott occasionally includes moments of "topicality, realism (and a hint of menace)" in this set, a tendency consistent with his previous writings. Nevertheless, Scott said that writing the Cherrys series was "the greatest fun in the world".

The Cherrys series consists of 14 books, published from 1952 to 1965, the last being published after Will Scott died. Numbers 1–12 in the series were illustrated by Lilian Buchanan who also illustrated some of Enid Blyton's children's books. Numbers 1–12 in the series contain various pictorial maps of the stories' fictional settings, for example Market Cray and River House, on the end papers. The maps are based upon sketches and ideas by Scott, and they were realised by Lilian Buchanan. They contain some details which have similarities with the layout of Herne Bay. These twelve books are illustrated throughout with black and white drawings. Due to their decorative qualities, this set of books has been described as a collector's item by the Thoresby Society. The stories are about a family of children whose middle-class parents, especially the father, play with them and encourage adventures, some of which are imaginary. The series is aimed at a reading age of about 10 years in the middle classes of the 1950s to 1960s era. Many of the stories are set in the fictional village of Market Cray, which may have some reference to St Mary Cray, or even an indirect or hidden reference to St. Mary Mead, the fictional home of Agatha Christie's sleuth Miss Marple. The characters are: Captain and Mrs Cherry; Jimmy Cherry; Jane Cherry; Roy Cherry; Pam Cherry; Mr Watson the monkey; Joseph the parrot; Mr and Mrs Wilks the neighbours; Sally Wilks; Mr Wilks' brother from the Isle of Wight; Mr and Mrs. Pringle; Joe Pringle; Betty Pringle; Mrs. Pearl the cleaner from Marigold Cottages; Mr Mount the baker. The fictional father Captain Cherry is a retired explorer whose name may be a reference to Apsley Cherry-Garrard. Judith Ford (2013) describes Captain Cherry thus:

Captain Cherry is described as having been a famous explorer whose adventures had included an expedition along the Orinoco River. Having retired, the Captain finds that peace and quiet are the last things he wants, and so he starts to think of ways of finding or creating adventures, which he calls "happenings".

From the 1920s to the early 1960s, Scott was developing his idea of "happenings" as creative adventures in social environments (not to be confused with the performance art happenings as developed by Allan Kaprow). Scott's happenings were fully realised in his Cherrys series.

=== First: The Cherrys of River House (1952) ===
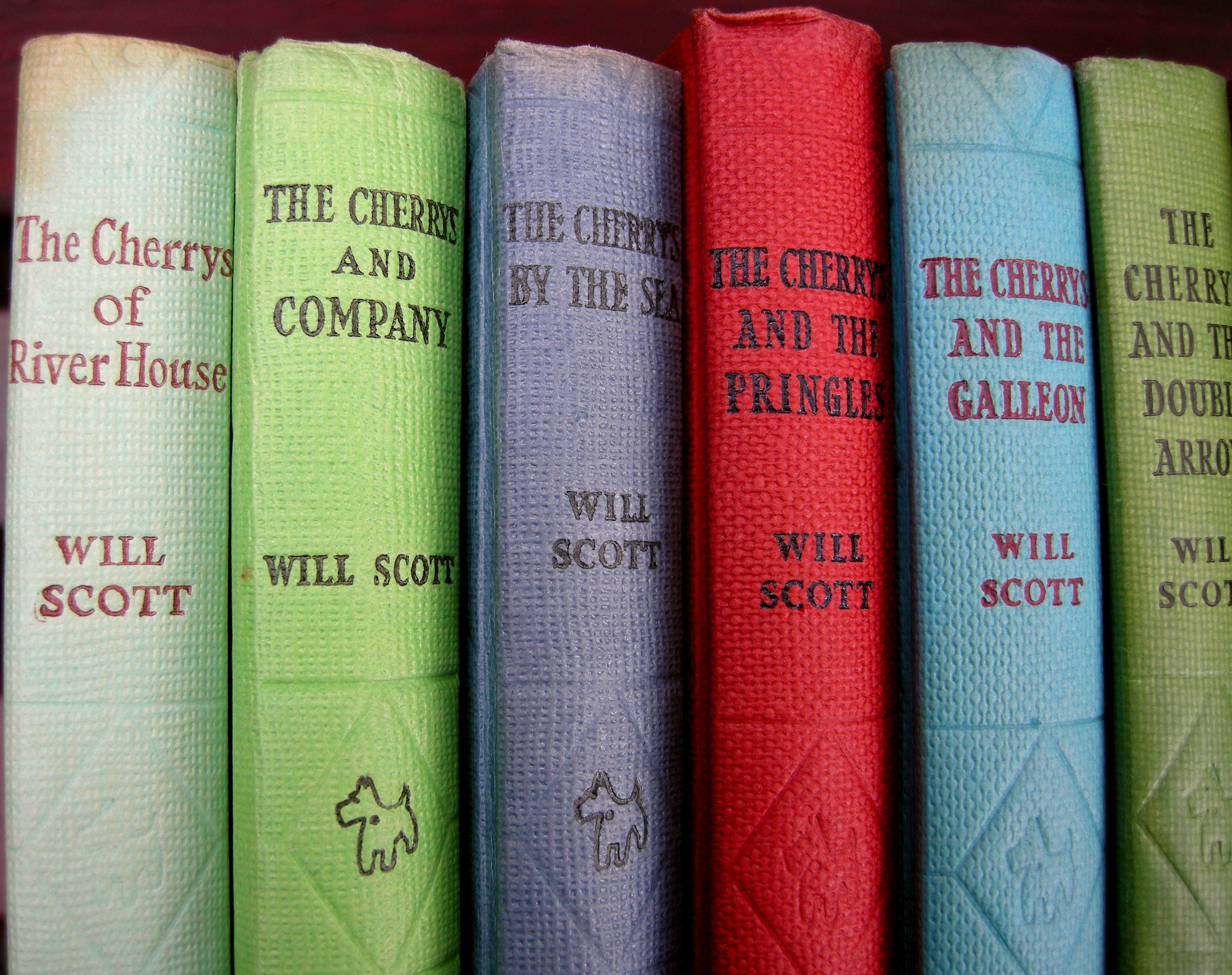
The Cherrys series nos 1–6

The dedication says, "A book for Mike to remind him of the days when all of us – and Daisy's sister – dashed about, like The Cherrys themselves, all over the place, from the beginning of Kent to the end of the Windrush, having a high old time". The story is about children who have happenings "as they called their adventures", and this may be the first written example of the usage of the word, "happening" in this way. This book was published in French by Editions G. P. in 1962 under the title La famille Cherry de la maison sur la Riviere, translated by Genevieve Meker and illustrated in colour by Pierre Le Guen. Happenings: (1) Their first happening (Orienteering in setting inspired by Dawes Folly at East Blean Woods near Dargate, Kent); (2) Through hostile territory (Escaping under cover, set at fictional St Mary Cray); (3) Treasure Island (bivouacking up a tree, set in St Mary Cray, mentions 1951 Great Exhibition); (4) If only we’re in time! (Car rally quiz, fictional St Dennis Bay setting inspired by Minnis Bay at Birchington-on-Sea, first Black Jack story); (5) Nothing at all to do (sending messages via animals, set in St Mary Cray); (6) Find me who can! (First manhunt for Black Jack, set in St Mary Cray, dares); (7) He must be somebody (second manhunt for Black Jack, set in St Mary Cray, keeping covert watch); (8) Black Jack strikes again! (third manhunt for Black Jack, set in St Mary Cray, treasure map); (9) Clue upon clue (fourth manhunt for Black Jack, set in St Mary Cray, fingerprints); Unmasked! (final instalment of Black Jack story, set in St Mary Cray, disguises).

=== Second: The Cherrys and Company (1953) ===
This edition was reprinted four times, in 1953, 1956, 1957 and 1961. The dust jacket carries a quotation from The Times Literary Supplement, "The Cherrys are a lively, likeable family of four children, their mother and their father, a retired explorer, who thinks he likes a quiet life in the country, and is constantly inventing "Happenings" which keep the family on the move round the countryside in their old car". This book was published by American Book Company in 1962 in French under the title Les Cherry Et Compagnie; illustrated by Pierre Le Guen. Happenings: (1) The games they get up to (the game of left-right, set in fictional St Mary Cray); (2) Man in armour (description of gale inspired by North Sea flood of 1953); (3) Adventure on See-Saw Mountain (polar conditions and relief expedition, set in St Mary Cray); (4) Disappearing trick (first instalment of Black Jack Junior story, set in St Mary Cray, setting false trails); (5) Black Jack Junior, Pirate (second instalment of Black Jack Junior story, set in St Mary Cray, boat-chase) (6) Kidnapped (pirates, set in St Mary Cray); (7) Mystery of See-Saw Mountain (mountain-climbing, set in St Mary Cray); (8) The Empty House (night-searches, set in St Mary Cray); (9) Little clue, big clue (intruder identified, set in St Mary Cray); (10) Biggest clue of all (blindfolded Mystery tour).

=== Third: The Cherrys by the Sea (1954) ===
The happenings or adventures all take place at the fictional St Denis Bay, inspired by Minnis Bay at Birchington-on-Sea, which setting may be partly informed by Scott's residence nearby at Herne Bay. The map of St Denis Bay on the book's endpapers, possibly by Scott himself, shows similarity to Minnis Bay along the beach, but the town is imaginary. The stories start with a message in a bottle and end with a haunted sea front. It was published in French in 1963 by Rouge et Or Dauphine as Les Cherry au Bord de la Mer, illustrated by Pierre Le Guen. In 1970 it was published by Estudios Cor in Portuguese as Uma aventura na praia (A Familia Cherry). Happenings: The message in the bottle; The watch on the coast (coastguarding); On the trail of the Oozlum (reference to Oozlum bird, description of wanted man and manhunt, coastguarding); Alone on a desert isle (shipwreck and rescue); Follow my leader (how the Cherrys met the Pringles, inspired by the Woozle story by A. A. Milne, i.e. people tracking each other in a circuit); Look out for Smiths! (avoiding an imaginary fifth column made up of people called Smith); The slap-dash carnival (inspired by the 1950s Herne Bay Carnival;. story includes hostile characters typical of contemporary children's comic strip tales); This way or that? (cipher); Seaside Christmas (children fund purchase of their dinghy, the Sandman); The haunted sea front (red herrings).

=== Fourth: The Cherrys and the Pringles (1955) ===
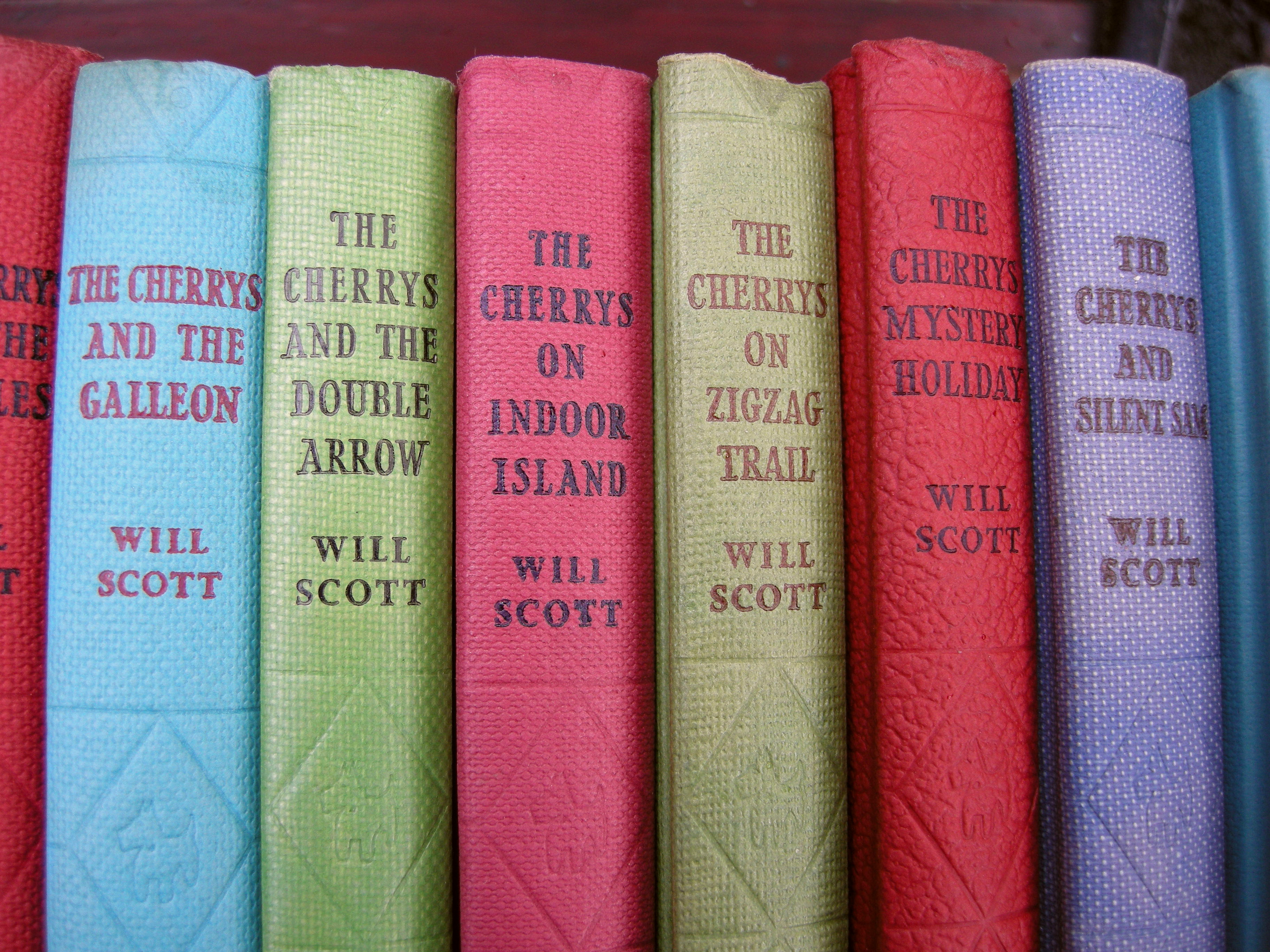
The Cherrys series nos 5–10

The Cherry children are joined by their new friends, the Pringle children, and their father Captain invents happenings or adventures for them. All stories are set in fictional St Mary Cray. Happenings: The great reception (the children lay on a reception committee greeting); Let it rain! (snakes and ladders game on the staircase); Mr. Pringle has a go (attempt by Pringle to create a happening); The Crocotosh (the children hide under a raincoat); Early birds (following a newspaper trail); The other house (the first Littles and Bigs story - the children leave a clue to a prize for the adults); The torn treasure chart (the Bigs and Littles each receive two-quarters of the chart - each must fight for the other two-quarters to find the treasure); The battle of Bigs And Littles (Bigs and Littles creep up on each other to see the pieces of chart); Let them have it! (Roy gives the Littles' pieces of chart to the Bigs); I know where! (the race to the buried treasure).

=== Fifth: The Cherrys and the Galleon (1956) ===
An island becomes a make-believe galleon, with a pictorial map on the endpapers showing the island. Happenings: The get-on-with-its; The great cross-over; The well-I-never place; The seaside at home; The peculiar periscope; The famous think; The big idea; The big mystery; The big work; The big day. There could be literary references in these subtitles to ancient ideas of transition and perception.

=== Sixth: The Cherrys and the Double Arrow (1957) ===
The story starts with Captain Cherry organising the children to find an elm tree in a wood; written before the second wave of Dutch elm disease in 1967 caused most of these to be lost in the UK. There were 3 editions of the book in 1957–1973, including two impressions in 1957 and 1961. It was published in French in 1963 by Rouge et Or Dauphine as Les Cherry et la Double Fleche, illustrated by Pierre Le Guen. Happenings: This way to anywhere; The double arrow; Adventures of Jimmy's party; Adventures of Joe's party; Again and again; Roy in his own; Public notice; After him!; Strange disappearance of Mr Wilks; This way to the Bang Kwit.

=== Seventh: The Cherrys on Indoor Island (1958) ===
This is perhaps the definitive Cherrys series happening: a rainy day on which the interior of River House becomes an imaginary indoor island for the children, organised as an adventure for the children by their father Captain Cherry. Happenings: The wreck; The castaways; The cave; Exploring the jungle; Mountain rescue; The mysterious footprint; Yes, it's pirates!; A sail! A sail!; But where can it be?; Buried treasure.

=== Eighth: The Cherrys on Zigzag Trail (1959) ===
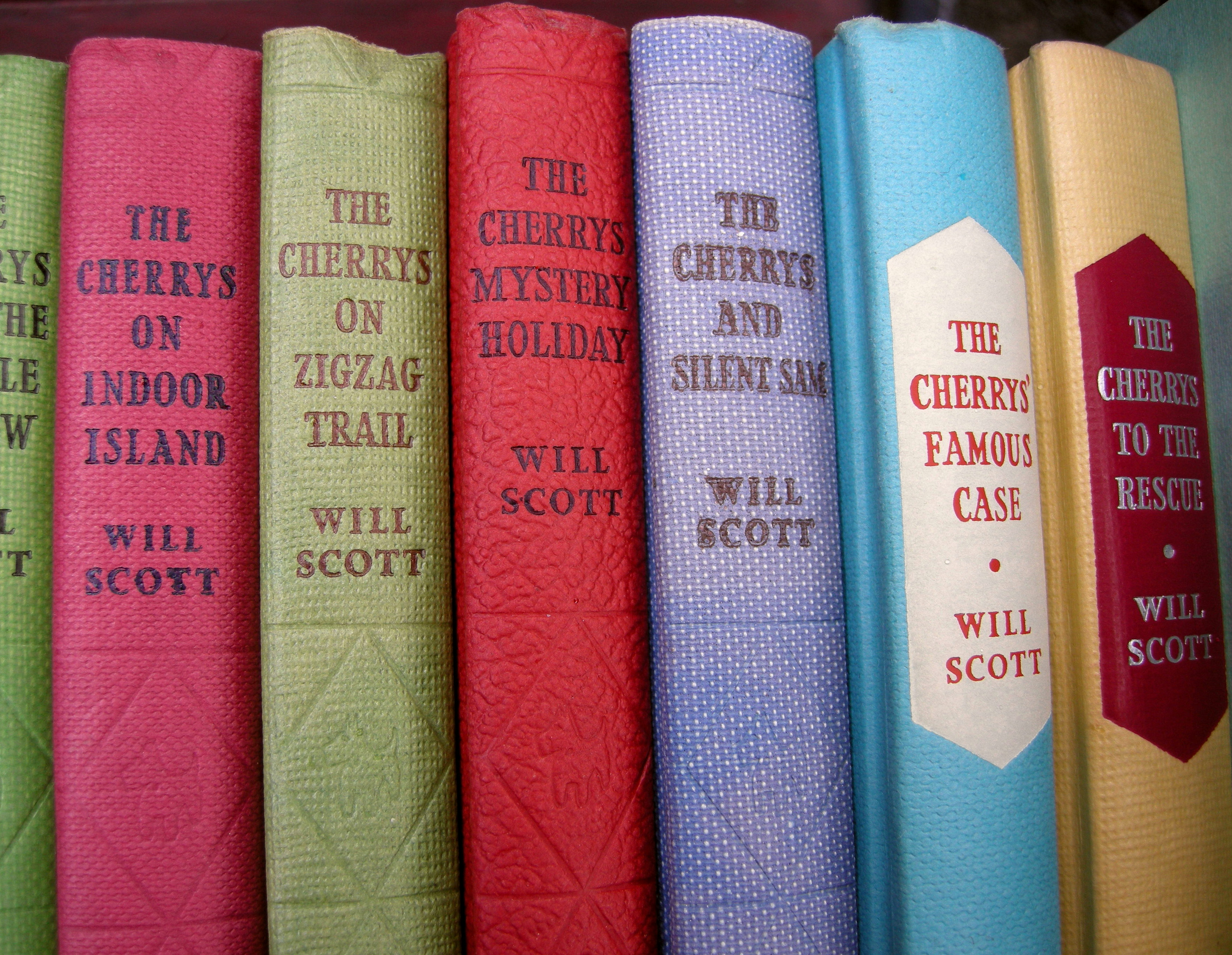
The Cherrys series nos 6–12

There were two impressions in 1959 and 1962. The story starts with a game of Silly Golf, which may have been informed by the crazy golf entertainment at Hampton-on-Sea near to Will Scott's home at Herne Bay. Happenings: Mr Wilks cries 'Look!’; Mr. Nobody; Nothing but mysteries; The standstill race; The Society For Finding Things Out; Old sailor from over the water; Away they go; Smart work; The same-sounding words; The end of the trail.

=== Ninth: The Cherrys' Mystery Holiday (1960) ===
One edition was published in English in 1960. The title may have been informed by the novelty of the mystery tours being run by coach companies at the time. Passengers paid for a day out at an unknown destination which could be a pleasant surprise but which sometimes brought them to their home area. Happenings: Keep your eyes open; The mystery of Mr Wotherspoon; The mystery of the pirate chief; Spik no English!; The great seaweed mystery; The writing in the sand; The mystery of the Jumping Jacks; The mystery of Neptune Island; Most mysterious of all; It's a mystery!

=== Tenth: The Cherrys and Silent Sam (1961) ===
This story is based on the mystery-man plot. Happenings: A very peculiar affair; He must be watched; Red hot news!; The next move; At it again; Caught!; What a surprise!; Then who is it?; I know who it is; Oh no, it isn't!

=== Eleventh: The Cherrys' Famous Case (1962) ===
Two editions were published in 1962 and 1972, in English and another language. The story starts by examining the idea of clues and evidence. Happenings: The day that woke up; Missing!; The Home-made Police-Force; Hot on the trail; The footprint again; The light in the window; That third clue; Clue all the time; Action!; Portrait of the Queen.

=== Twelfth: The Cherrys to the Rescue (1963) ===
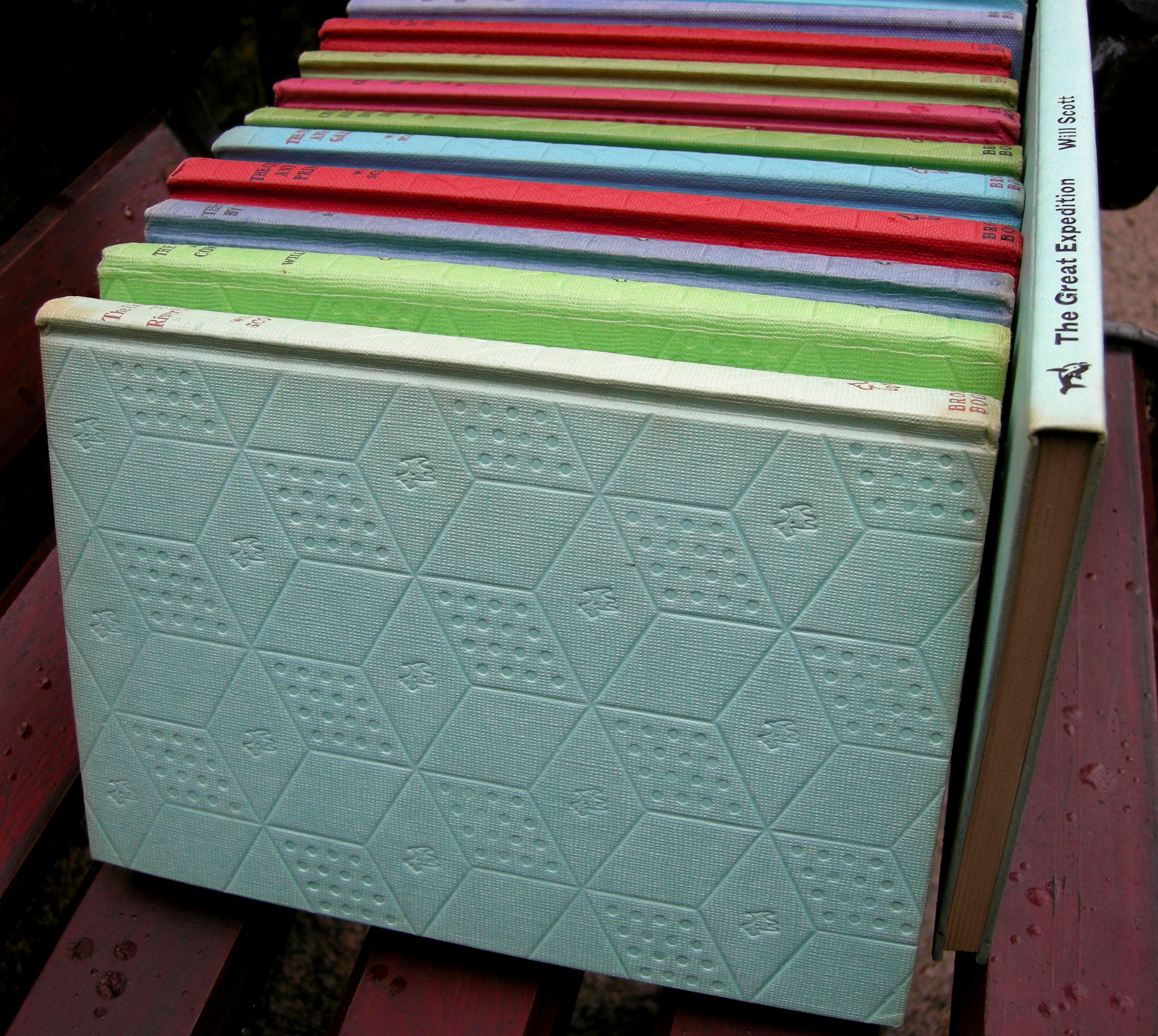
The Cherrys series books

It was published in English in 1963 and reprinted in 1970. This story is a follow-my-leader tracking game. The pictorial map on the endpapers has some reference to Winnie-the-Pooh and the Woozle story in which Pooh and Piglet are following their own footprints. Happenings: Where has he got to?; To the rescue!; Strange tale from a stranger; Which way now?; Here's your jungle!; Escape!; False trail; All meet at One-Tree Hill; Lost in the fog; Rescue!

=== Thirteenth: The Cherrys in the Snow (1964) ===
It was published in English in 1964 and reprinted in 1970. The British Library holds a reference copy. In the winter of 1962–1963 there was an unusually thick snowfall and the surface of the sea froze along the shoreline close to Scott's house, Windermere, on Westcliff at Herne Bay. It is possible that this book was a response to that winter. Happenings: Nothing but nothing; Enter Mr. Misery; The start of a rumour; The search from end to end; You'd never guess!; "Keep him out of sight!"; Tell-tale trail; If only it works; Vanished!; Away again.

=== Fourteenth: The Cherrys and the Blue Balloon (1965) ===
A posthumous publication. The phrase, "last appearance" in the final chapter heading may be significant. The British Library holds a reference copy. Happenings: First appearance of the blue balloon; What the littles thought; What the bigs thought; But what did the man think?; Watched; Where is Augustus?; The amazing truth; The light in the window; The night watch; Last appearance of the blue balloon. A rough sketch by Scott, for a map supporting this story, still exists.

== Other children's books ==
=== Half-Term Trail (1955) ===
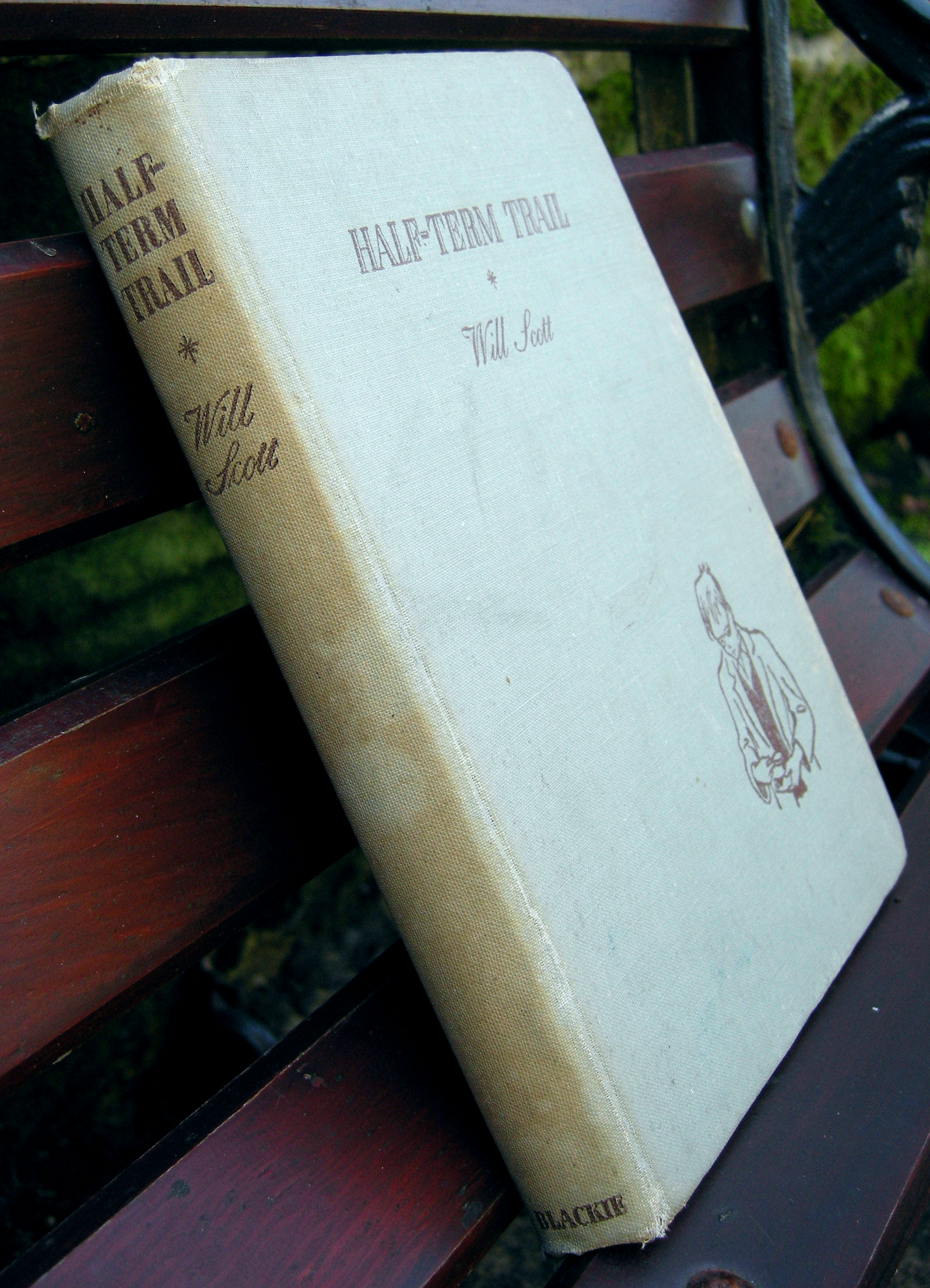
Half Term Trail

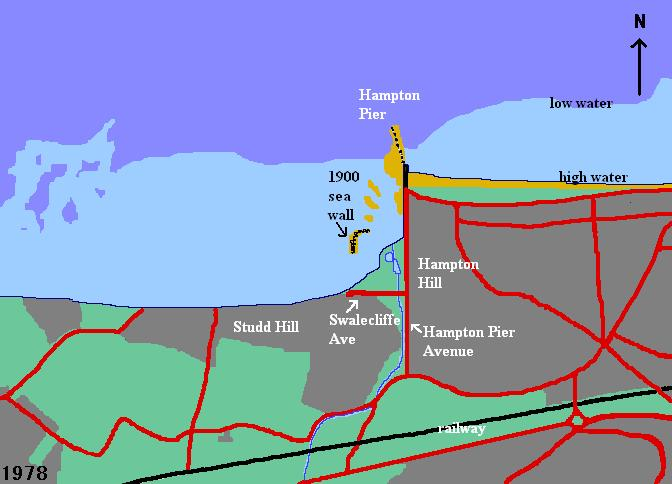
Drawing based on 1978 OS map of Hampton On Sea

This book is illustrated by Mary Willett. The British Library holds a reference copy. It is set in a recognisable version of Herne Bay, Kent and Hampton-on-Sea. These are given the fictional names of Sandilands and West Bay respectively, and bear no resemblance to Sandilands in Lincolnshire. Herne Bay's clock tower and adjoining public gardens appear in the story, as do Hampton-on-Sea's jetty, concrete shelter, the beach and the boating lake as it was in 1955. Swalecliffe Avenue appears in the story under the name of Matchbox Lane, and as of 2011 the area of scrub mentioned in the book still exists. Pleasant Cottage (later called Hampton Bungalow) in Swalecliffe Avenue appears in the story as Dilly Dally cottage in Matchbox Lane. Mary Willett's drawings within the book bear little or no resemblance to Herne Bay or Hampton-on-Sea, but the hand-drawn map at the end of the book – possibly by Will Scott – is clearly derived from OS maps of Hampton-on-Sea. The endpapers-drawing shows an idealised Swalecliffe Avenue. Two names used in the story, Bottle and Sticky, may have been suggested by local Herne Bay names, although the characterisations are fictional. In the 1950s there was an antique shop in Herne Bay High Street called Len Pottle, and the caretaker at Hampton Primary School was Mr Stickels. Chapter headings: The Very Beginning; The Tuckers and the Tanners; Mystery!; And More Mystery!; The Knife; First Clue to Tim; Rings Round Dilly Dally; Surprises; Sticky's Story; The Chase Begins; Big Clue to Mary; The Trail of the Chalk Crosses; Tim Alone; Only One Missing; "I've got it!"; The Case is closed; Map of West Bay, Sandilands.

==== Commentary ====
The story follows the attempts of five children to clear the name of their friend Sticky by trailing and catching a homeless thief with disagreeable manners; a "ghastly type" to be identified by his brown boots. The boots are possibly a reference to the 1931 monologue Brahn Boots by Stanley Holloway, which was still regularly played on BBC Home Service radio in the 1950s. The song's lyrics describe the apparent low-class taste of a man clad in brown boots, but he is too modest to say that he has given his good black boots away to the poor; it is really a parable on the subject of unquestioning snobbery. An obvious clue not followed by the children is that the thief initially enters the shop asking for the previous Wednesday's newspaper. The book's publication in 1955 and the timing of the plot during the June half-term holiday possibly indicate the Children and Young Persons (Harmful Publications) Act of 6 June 1955. If this is so, then the disagreeable man could be taken to be the author's characterisation of D. C. Thomson & Co., or its cartoonist Bill Holroyd, who published children's cartoons such as Jack Silver and His Dog Black. This cartoon was later lampooned by Viz as Jack Black and his Dog Silver. It is perhaps also significant in this context that the publication of Half-Term Trail in 1955 follows press commentary on the first few books of The Cherrys series, and that Scott did not like to be compared with Enid Blyton. (Note: It was reported in 1963 that Scott objected to his work being compared with that of Enid Blyton.) In Will Scott's story, the children pursue the brown-booted man unquestioningly, and they are described thus:

". . . and if you'd done something you shouldn't have done they were the last people you'd have liked to have looking at you. They looked really dangerous".

The children douse the brown-booted man with red paint at the end; this could be understood as a symbolic killing as the paint is blood-coloured. We never find out what has driven him to steal or why he is bad-tempered. This aspect suggests that the apparently simple children's tale has a moral depth which is possibly intended to undermine its own plot and thus to bring into question the moral basis of some other children's detective tales of the era. (Note: This was commented on in the comic strip Jack Black in Viz (comic).)

=== The Great Expedition (1962) ===
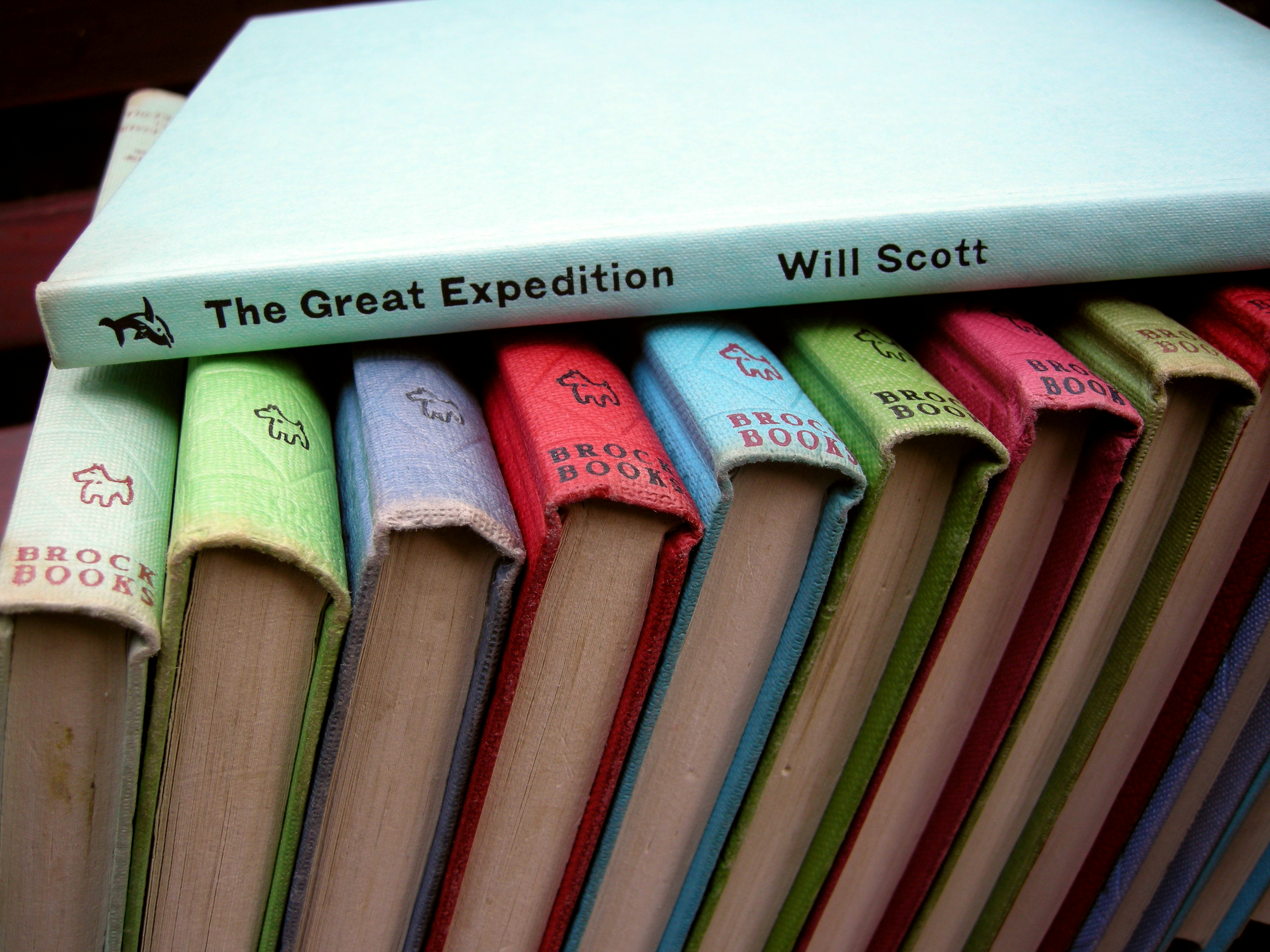
The Great Expedition

The author intended this to be the thirteenth in The Cherrys series, but the agent discouraged the idea of a thirteenth novel for children, and the new publisher declined to produce a matching cover for the previous series. (Note: Scott ordered a copy of The Great Expedition himself from his publishers, and the delivery note 009884, dated 18 April 1963, shows that he was charged the full six-shilling price of the book.) The British Library holds a reference copy. The book contains 13 coloured and black and white illustrations in the text, one frontispiece and a cover illustration, all by C. Clixby Watson, plus 4 coloured and black and white maps by Henry West and others. The dust-jacket summary says: "A wise old night-watchman convinced Dick, Mick and Henry that any unvisited place is uncharted territory – and that there was no need to climb Everest or track through dark jungles to enjoy the thrill of discovery. In fact, they found the tracing of an unnamed river to its source a most exciting adventure". The story is set near Newbury, Berkshire. Chapters: 1. Somewhere – But Where? 2. The End of Somewhere; 3. The Beginning of Nowhere; 4. Several Questions; 5. The Second Camp; 6. The Relief Expedition; 7. The Rising at Million Bridges; 8. The Expedition Moves On; 9. The Last Camp; 10. Green Hat's Game; 11. No Time to Lose; 12. The Last Lap; 13. The Top of All; 14. Back to Somewhere.
