= Married for Money =

1939 play

- Written by: Will Scott
- Original language: English
- Genre: Comedy

Premiere
- Date premiered: 23 October 1939
- Place premiered: Theatre Royal, Birmingham

Married for Money is a 1939 comedy play by the British author Will Scott. It premiered at the Theatre Royal, Birmingham before transferring to the Aldwych Theatre in London's West End where it ran for performances between 17 November and 26 December 1939, in the early months of the Second World War. The West End cast included Bryan Coleman, Ronald Simpson, Mackenzie Ward, Eliot Makeham, Nora Swinburne, Dinah Sheridan and Viola Lyel. It is a farce revolving around a put-upon husband who conceals a secret stash of money from his wife.

== Bibliography ==
- Wearing, J. P. The London Stage 1930–1939: A Calendar of Productions, Performers, and Personnel. Rowman & Littlefield, 2014.
