= Arthur Hardy (actor) =

British actor (1870–1951)

Arthur Hardy (15 April 1870 – 1951) was a London born British actor, whose appearances include Atlantic (1929) and Dreyfus (1931).

== Filmography ==
- Atlantic (1929) - Maj Boldy
- Raise the Roof (1930) - Croxley Bellairs
- Dreyfus (1931) - Gen. Mercier
- Creeping Shadows (1931) - Sir Edwin Paget
- The Great Gay Road (1931) - Sir Crispin
- Creeping Shadows (1931)
- Other People's Sins (1931)
- Abdul the Damned (1935) - Ambassador
- The Amazing Quest of Ernest Bliss (1936) - Crawley
- The Vulture (1937) - Li Fu
