= The Limping Man (1936 film) =

1936 film directed by Walter Summers

- Feature on the film in Picture Show (20 March 1937)
- Directed by: Walter Summers
- Written by: Walter Summers
- Based on: The Limping Man by William Matthew Scott
- Produced by: Water Summers
- Starring: Francis L. Sullivan; Hugh Wakefield; Patricia Hilliard; Judy Kelly
- Cinematography: Cyril Bristow; Lionel Tomlinson
- Edited by: Bryan Langley
- Music by: Harry Acres
- Production company: Welwyn Studios
- Distributed by: Pathé Pictures International
- Release date: 30 October 1936
- Running time: 72 minutes
- Country: United Kingdom
- Language: English

The Limping Man is a 1936 British crime film directed by Walter Summers and starring Francis L. Sullivan, Hugh Wakefield and Patricia Hilliard. It was written by Summer, adapted from the 1931 play of the same title by William Matthew Scott. The film was shot at Welwyn Studios.

== Cast ==
- Francis L. Sullivan as Theodore Disher
- Hugh Wakefield as Colonel Paget
- Patricia Hilliard as Gloria Paget
- Robert Cochran as Philip Nash
- Leslie Perrins as Paul Hoyt
- Judy Kelly as Olga Hoyt
- Iris Hoey as Mrs. Paget
- Frank Atkinson as Inspector Cable
- George Pughe as Chicago Joe
- Harry Hutchinson as Limpy
- John Turnbull as Inspector Potts
- Syd Crossley as Sparrow
- Arthur Brander as Sandall

== Reception ==
The Monthly Film Bulletin wrote: "The story is complicated and confused and the thrills suffer from too efficient comedy relief provided by Hugh Wakefield as an absurd but charming Colonel. Francis Sullivan, as Theodore Disher an internationally famous detective, is outstanding in a cast that is generally attractive and competent."

Kine Weekly wrote: "Romantic crime melodrama, unfolded against a bizarre London kaleidoscope ... Oddly enough, the picture could have been played straight and more's the pity is wasn't."

The Daily Film Renter wrote: "Well put over to tune of murder, abduction and secret panels, narrative has usual red herring clues seemingly implicating numerous persons, quota of suspense, and excellent leavening of comedy and romance."
