= R767 road (Ireland) =

Road in Ireland

R767 road
- Bóthar R767
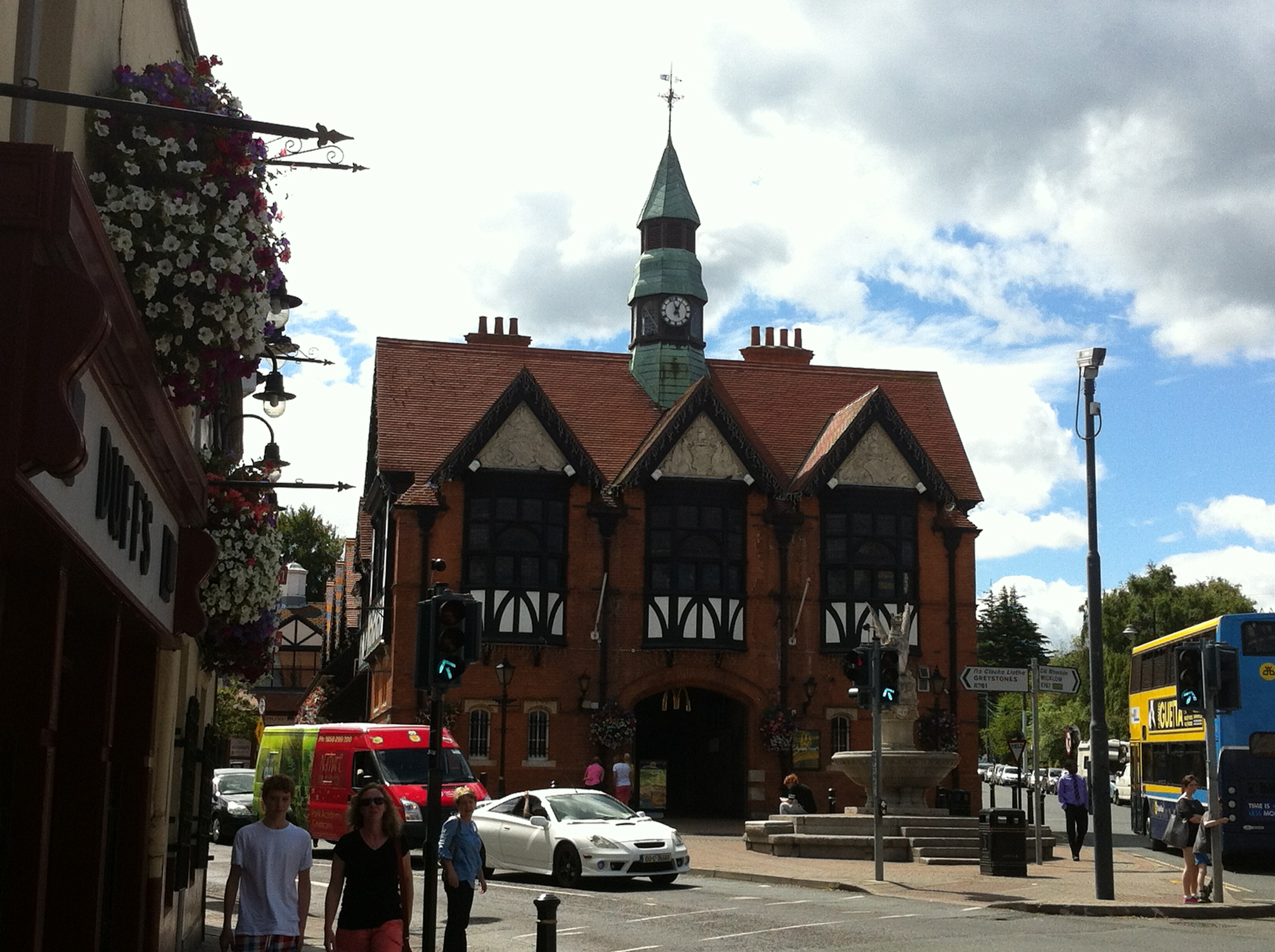
- Bray Town Hall at junction of R767 and R761

Route information
- Length: 3 km (1.9 mi)

Location
- Country: Ireland
- Primary destinations: County Wicklow; Kilcroney; Ballywaltrim; Bray

Highway system
- Roads in Ireland; Motorways; Primary; Secondary; Regional

The R767 road is a regional road in Ireland which connects J7 (Bray South) of the N11 to Bray Town Hall on Bray Main Street. The majority of the road is known as the Killarney Road.

== Route ==
The route begins at the Kilcroney Interchange (J7 Bray South/Greystones North), which is one of the busiest junctions in the country. The route crosses the N11 and meets the Ram Roundabout. The road then travels northwest towards Bray. The R767 passes through many of Bray's southwestern suburbs, such as Ballywaltrim, Oldcourt, Killarney and King Edward Road. The route terminates at its junction with the R761 at Bray Town Hall.

== See also ==
- Roads in Ireland
- National primary road
- National secondary road
