= Christ Church, Bray =

- Christ Church, Bray
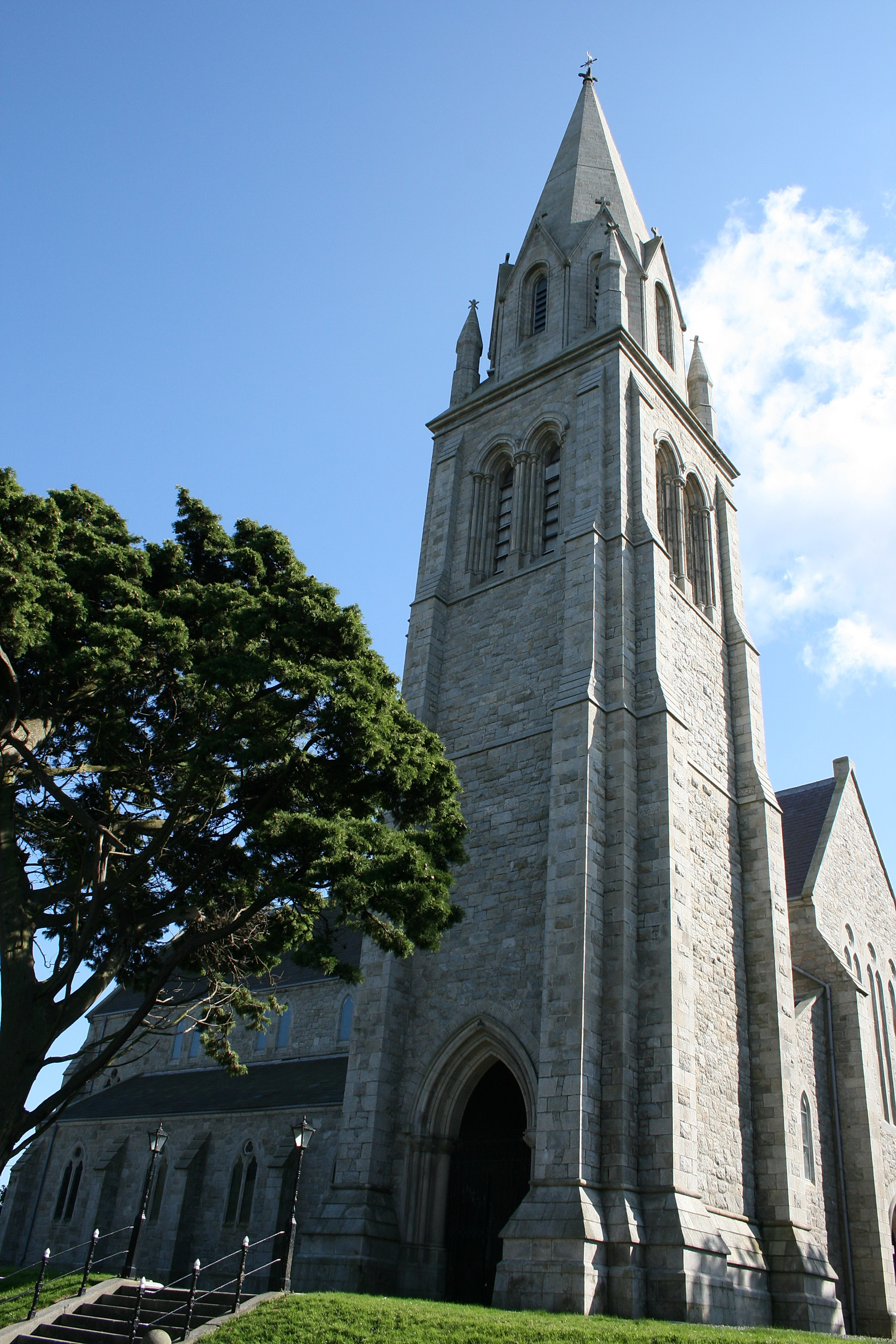
- Christ Church, Bray
- Christ Church, Bray
- 53°11′49.01532″N 6°6′44.91817″W
- Location: Bray, County Wicklow
- Country: Ireland
- Denomination: Church of Ireland
- Website: http://www.christchurchbray.ie

History
- Founded: 1861

Administration
- Province: Dublin
- Diocese: Dublin and Glendalough

Clergy
- Bishop: Most Rev Michael Jackson
- Rector: Rev Baden Stanley

Christ Church, Bray is in the Church of Ireland parish of Bray, County Wicklow located on Church Road on a rise, previously known as the Rock of Bray, behind Bray Town Hall. The church was built in 1863 in a Gothic Revival style.

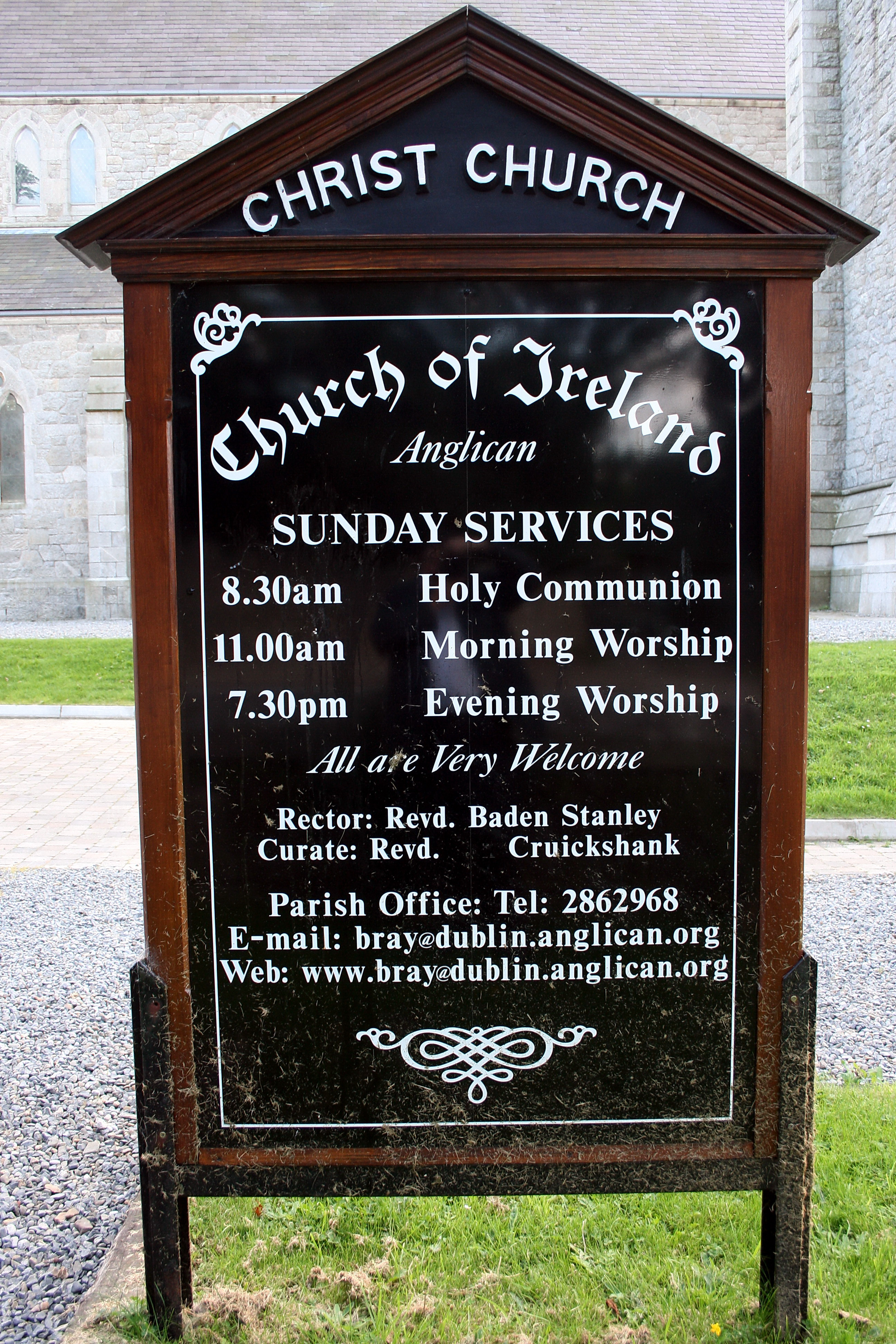
Church entrance sign

== History and architecture ==
The church was consecrated in 1863 on St James' Day, 25 July. It is built from local granite in a simple French style but with several features, especially windows, which could have been derived from Irish medieval origins. When the church opened in 1863, the spire was not yet built. Work on it began in 1865 but completion was delayed by storms until 1870. This 53.3 m (175 ft) landmark, buttressed and crowned by pinnacles, an octagonal drum and spire, can be seen far and wide from the surrounding countryside and from distance out to sea.

For a further 10 years the tower remained empty until the peal of eight bells was hung. It is said that the impetus for a collection for a peal of bells came in a visit to Bray in 1877 with a remark by Prime Minister William Ewart Gladstone that "so noble a church tower as this should not be silent".

The bells first rung out in 1881 (exactly 20 years after construction of the church started). They are still rung each year at midnight on 31 December to welcome a new year. The bells at Christ Church have been described as one of the finest peals in the whole of Ireland.

== Organ ==
The organ of Christ Church was built by the organ builders Peter Conacher and Co. in 1911. It has 30 stops spread over three manuals and pedals. It was built in the style of its time; late English Romantic and is typical of that era. Unusually, the choir vestry occupies the organ case at ground level, with the pipework being housed above it.

Currently, a restoration is taking place by the Irish organbuilding firm Trevor Crowe Ltd. It is planned to restore Co. Wickow's largest organ to full playability, and enhance the tonal specification at a later date. As of late 2015, a new console has been fitted and some restoration work has been carried out.

The organ's specification is summarised as:

- Great: Double Diapason 16, Open Diapason (Large) 8, Open Diapason (Small) 8, Gamba 8, Rohrflote 8, Principal 4, Harmonic Flute 4, Twelfth 2 2/3, Mixture III, Fifteenth 2 Trumpet 8.
- Swell: Bourdon 16, Open Diapason 8, Rohrflote 8, Salicional 8, Voix Celeste 8, Principal 4, Mixture II, Horn 8, Oboe 8, Tremulant.
- Choir: Flauto Traverso 8, Dulciana 8, Wald Flute 4, Piccolo 2, Orchestral Oboe 8, Clarinet 8.
- Pedal: Open Diapason 16, Bourdon 16, Unison 8, Trombone 16.
- Couplers: Swell to Great, Swell Octave to Great, Swell to Pedal, Swell to Choir, Great to Pedal, Choir to Pedal, Choir Suboctave.

== Organists and choir ==
The current organist and director of music is John Morris. Former organists include Derek Verso, Stuart O'Sullivan, David Bedlow and Sandra Bedlow.

The church has a large, robed, mixed-voice choir of children and adults, who lead the singing on Sundays.
