= Bray Jazz Festival =

Irish jazz music festival

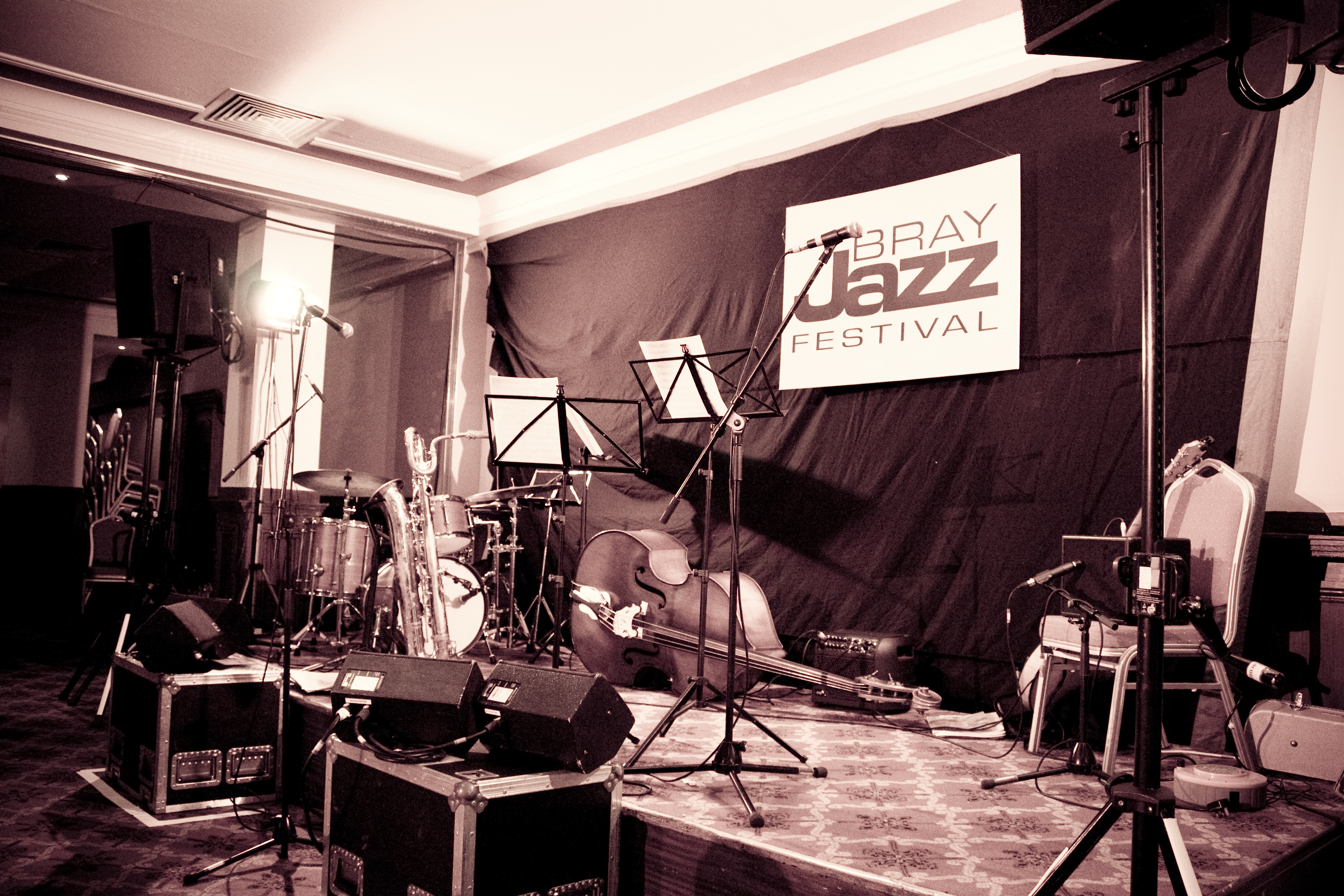
Instruments on a Bray Jazz Festival stage in 2010

Bray Jazz Festival is an Irish jazz music festival that takes place in Bray, Ireland, on the May bank holiday weekend. The festival marked its 25th anniversary in 2026.

Bray Jazz was established in 2000 with part-funding from Ireland's 'Millennium Fund'. The festival has been described by The Irish Times as "the connoisseur's jazz festival", and as "one of the very best small jazz festival's in Europe" (All About Jazz).

Bray Jazz Festival has featured performances by leading figures in contemporary international jazz, together with the leading players working in the jazz music scene in Ireland. The event is Ireland's leading contemporary jazz festival weekend, and the main jazz festival event happening within the Greater Dublin area.

Recent performers at Bray Jazz Festival have included Nubya Garcia and Vijay Iyer (2025), Orchestra Baobab and Dave Douglas (2024), Gerald Clayton and Julia Hulsmann (2023) and Bill Frisell, Tord Gustavsen and Yazz Ahmed (2022).
