= Spring Meeting =

- Directed by: Walter C. Mycroft; Norman Lee
- Written by: Walter C. Mycroft; Norman Lee
- Based on: Spring Meeting by Molly Keane (as M.J. Farrell) and John Perry
- Produced by: Walter C. Mycroft
- Starring: Enid Stamp-Taylor; Michael Wilding; Basil Sydney; Sarah Churchill; Nova Pilbeam
- Cinematography: Walter J. Harvey
- Edited by: Flora Newton
- Music by: Guy Jones
- Production company: Associated British Picture Corporation
- Distributed by: Pathé Pictures
- Release date: 23 January 1941
- Running time: 93 minutes
- Country: United Kingdom
- Language: English

Spring Meeting is a 1941 British comedy film directed by Walter C. Mycroft and Norman Lee and starring Enid Stamp-Taylor, Michael Wilding, Basil Sydney and Sarah Churchill. It was based on a 1938 play of the same title by Molly Keane (as M. J. Farrell) and John Perry. It was shot at Welwyn Studios. In 1942 it was given an American release, distributed by Monogram Pictures, and renamed, 'Three Wise Brides'.

== Premise ==
Instead of marrying Joan, a woman considered perfect by his parents, Tony falls for her little sister, Baby.

== Cast ==
- Enid Stamp-Taylor as Tiny Fox-Collier
- Michael Wilding as Tony Fox-Collier
- Basil Sydney as James
- Sarah Churchill as Joan Furze
- Nova Pilbeam as Baby Furze
- W.G. Fay as Johnny
- Margaret Rutherford as Aunt Bijou
- Henry Edwards as Sir Richard Furze
- Hugh McDermott as Michael Byrne

== Bibliography ==
- Goble, Alan. The Complete Index to Literary Sources in Film. Walter de Gruyter, 1999.
