= Spring Meeting (play) =

Advertisement for the Broadway production

Spring Meeting is a 1938 British comedy play written by Molly Keane (as M.J. Farrell) and John Perry. It was a hit in the West End, running for 310 performances at the Ambassadors Theatre between May 1938 and March 1939. Directed by John Gielgud, the cast included Niall MacGinnis, Edmund Breon, Nicholas Phipps, Joyce Carey, Zena Dare, Betty Chancellor and Margaret Rutherford. Rutherford's performance in particular attracted strong reviews. From December 1938 a Broadway version ran at the Morosco Theatre with a cast including Gladys Cooper and A.E. Matthews, lasting for 98 performances.

== Synopsis ==
Tiny Fox-Collier, a penniless and divorced adventuress brings her son Tony with her to Ireland intending to marry him to the eldest daughter of her old flame, Sir Richard Furze, a member of the Anglo-Irish aristocracy. However she is already in love with a local stable hand, while he rapidly falls for the younger daughter. To add to the complications Tiny begins to rekindle her old relationship with Sir Richard.

== Film Adaptation ==
In 1941 the play was turned into a film Spring Meeting directed by Walter Mycroft and featuring Nova Pilbeam, Michael Wilding, Sarah Churchill and Basil Sydney. Rutherford reprised her original role from the play.

== Bibliography ==
- Wearing, J.P. The London Stage 1930-1939: A Calendar of Productions, Performers, and Personnel. Rowman & Littlefield, 2014.
