= Fassaroe Cross =

- Ardchros an Fhásaigh Rua (Irish)
- St. Valery's Cross
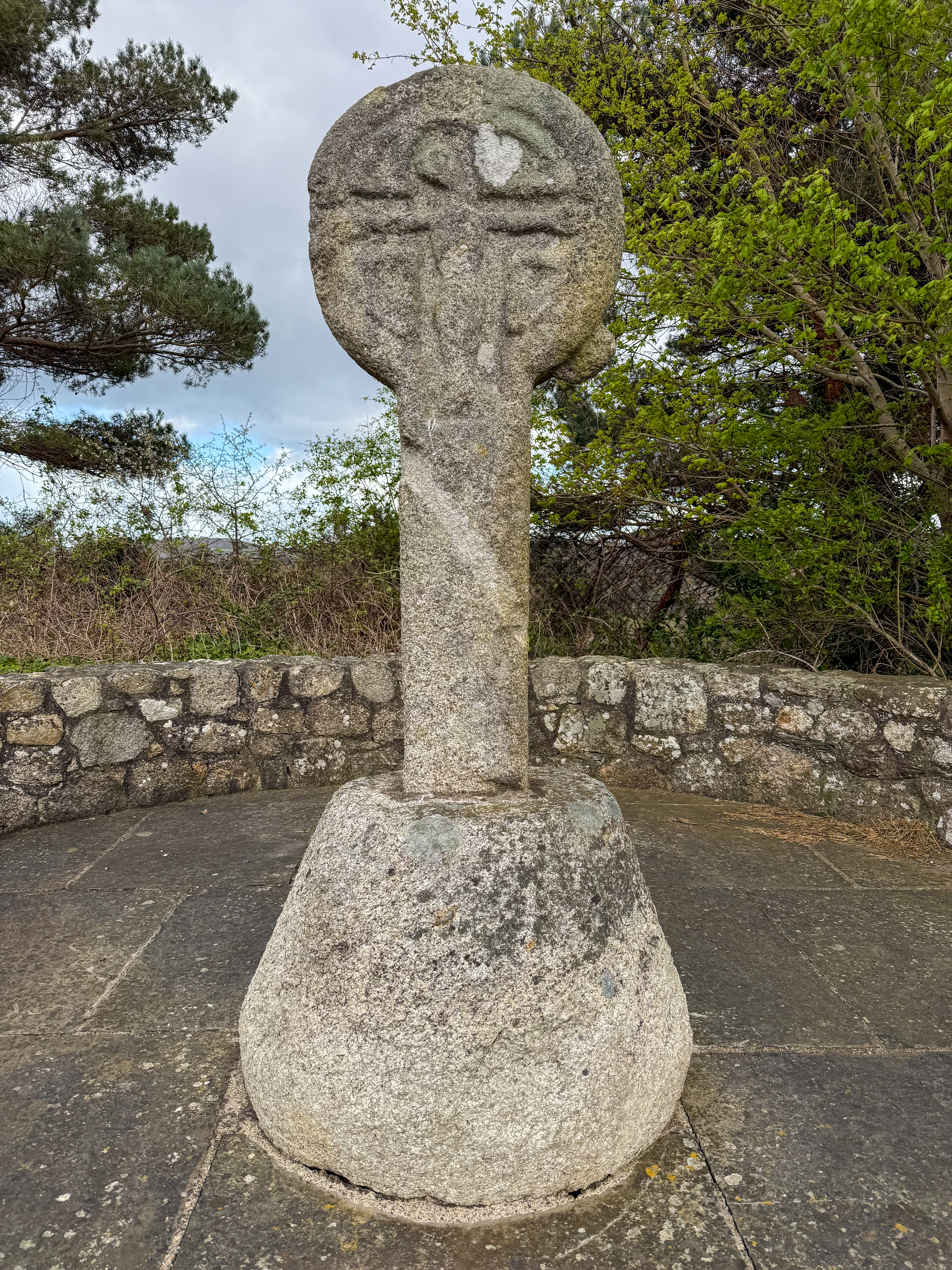

- Location within Ireland
- 53.195977°N 6.140506°W
- Type: High cross
- Location: Fassaroe, Bray, County Wicklow, Ireland

History
- Built: AD 1150–1200

Site notes
- Height: 1.42 metres (4.7 ft)
- Area: Bray River Valley

National monument of Ireland
- Official name: Fassaroe
- Reference no.: 337

Fassaroe Cross, also called St. Valery's Cross, is a high cross and National Monument located near Bray, County Wicklow, Ireland.

== Location ==
Fassaroe Cross is located to the west of Bray, just off the Berryfield Lane roundabout, 500 m (550 yd) northwest of the Bray River.

== History ==
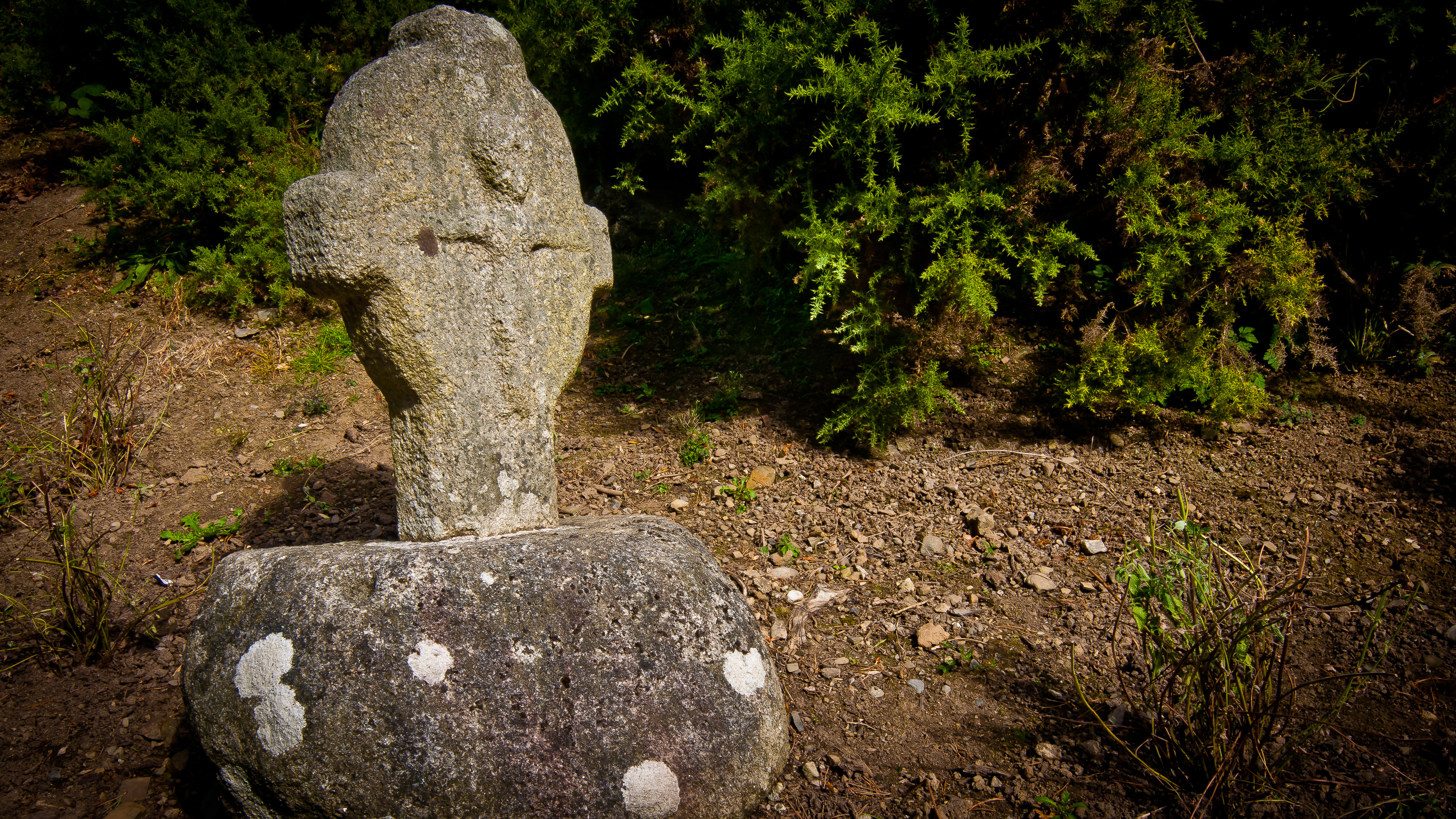
The "Little Cross" at Rathmichael, one of the Fassaroe Crosses

The cross originally stood at Ballyman (about 1.6 km (0.99 mi) NNW of the present site), and is believed to have been carved in the late 12th century. Other similar crosses in the Rathdown area are located at Rathmichael, Killegar and Shankill, and are collectively known as the "Fassaroe crosses"; they were probably carved by the same mason.

According to the English writer Anne Plumptre (1760–1818), who stayed with the Walker family at St. Valery in 1814–15, the cross was brought from a glen to Fassaroe, and stood originally in the center of a little paddock, round which runs the plantation. Pilgrims travelled from miles around and wore many paths down to the cross.

== Description ==
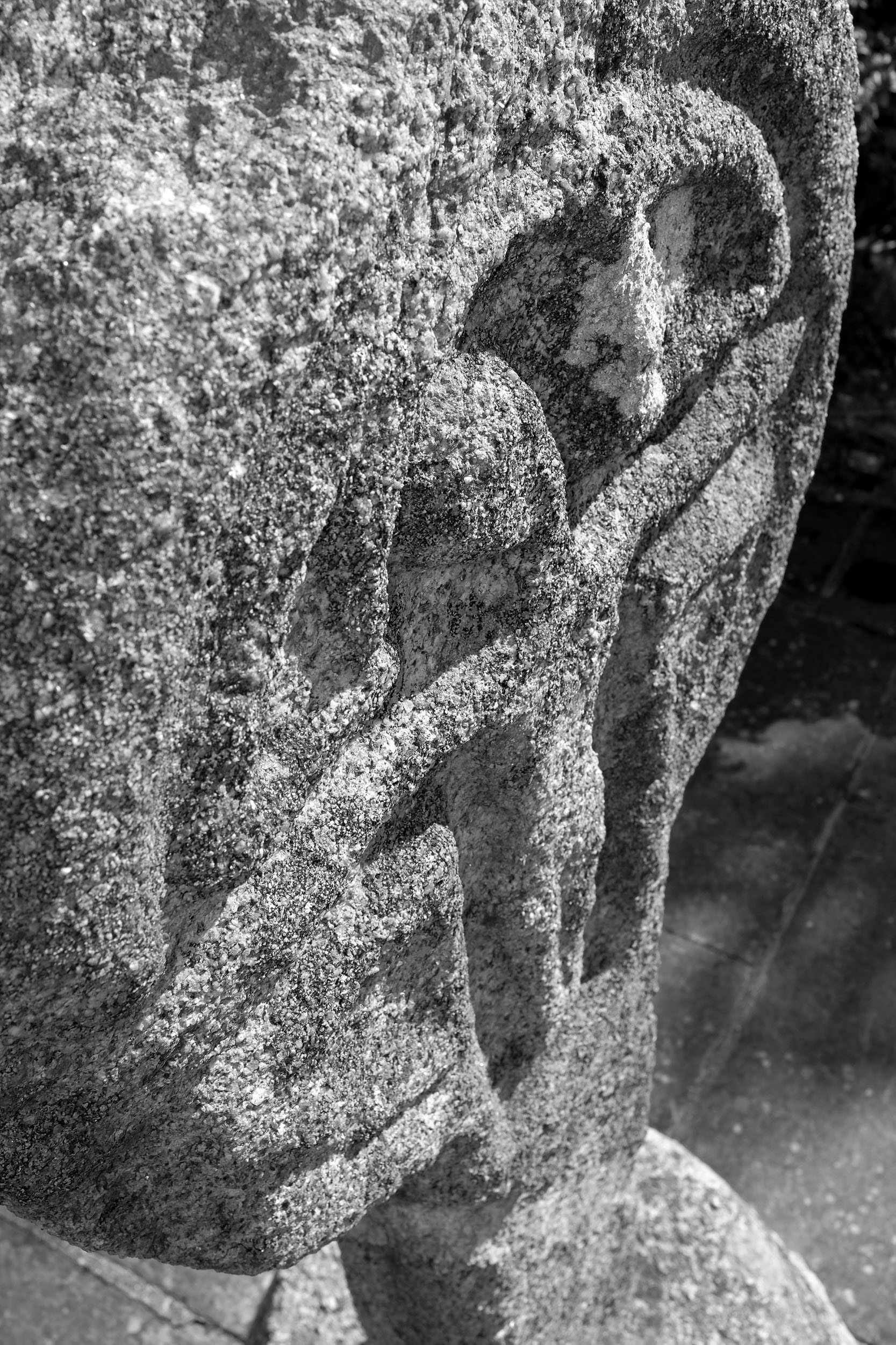
Detail of the cross face

The cross is made of granite with a band of quartz and stands 1.42 m (4.7 ft) high and is 16 cm (6.3 in) wide.

The west face bears a crucifixion, while the east face bears two very worn human heads, both bearded and one perhaps wearing a mitre. There are two other heads on the cross: one protruding from the south edge of the ring and another is situated on the north eastern side of the base.
