= Molly Keane =

Irish novelist and playwright (1904–1996)

Molly Keane (20 July 1904 – 22 April 1996), née Mary Nesta Skrine, and who also wrote as M. J. Farrell, was an Irish novelist and playwright.

== Early life ==
Keane was born Mary Nesta Skrine in Ryston Cottage, Newbridge, County Kildare. Her father, Walter Clarmont Skrine (died 1930), was from a Somerset family and owned land in Alberta, Canada, and was a fanatic for horses and hunting; her mother, Agnes Shakespeare Higginson (1864–1955), a poet who wrote under the pseudonym Moira O'Neill, was daughter of Charles Henry Higginson (son of James Macaulay Higginson, Governor of British Mauritius from 1851 to 1857), a colonial administrator in Mauritius.

Keane grew up at Ballyrankin House beside the River Slaney, a few miles south east of Bunclody, County Wexford and refused to go to boarding school in England as her siblings had done. She was educated by her mother, governesses, and at a boarding school in Bray, County Wicklow. Relations between Keane and her parents were cold and she states that she had no fun in her life as a child. Her own passion for hunting and horses was born out of her need for fun and enjoyment. Reading did not feature much in her family, and, although her mother wrote poetry, it was of a sentimental nature, "suitable to a woman of her class". Keane claimed she had never set out to be a writer, but at seventeen she was bedbound due to suspected tuberculosis, and turned to writing out of sheer boredom. It was then she wrote her first book, The Knight of Cheerful Countenance, which was published by Mills & Boon. She wrote under the pseudonym "M. J. Farrell", a name over a pub that she had seen on her return from hunting. She explained writing anonymously because "for a woman to read a book, let alone write one was viewed with alarm: I would have been banned from every respectable house in Co. Carlow."

In her teenage years, she spent much of her time in the Perry household in Woodruff, County Tipperary. Here she befriended the two children of the house, Sylvia and John Perry. She later collaborated with John in writing a number of plays. Among them was Spring Meeting, directed by John Gielgud in 1938, and one of the hits of the West End that year. She and Gielgud became lifelong friends.

== Career ==
Keane loved Jane Austen, and like Austen's, her ability lay in her talent for creating characters. This, with her wit and astute sense of what lay beneath the surface of people's actions, enabled her to depict the world of the big houses of Ireland in the 1920s and 1930s. She "captured her class in all its vicious snobbery and genteel racism". She used her married name for her later novels, several of which (including Good Behaviour and Time After Time) have been adapted for television. Between 1928 and 1956, she wrote 11 novels, and some of her earlier plays, under the pseudonym "M. J. Farrell". She was a member of Aosdána. Her husband died suddenly in 1946, and, following the failure of a play, she published nothing for twenty years. In 1981 Good Behaviour came out under her own name; the manuscript, which had languished in a drawer for many years, was lent to a visitor, the actress Peggy Ashcroft, who encouraged Keane to publish it. The novel was warmly received and was short-listed for the Booker Prize.

== Personal life and death ==
It was through the Perry family that Molly met Bobby Keane, whom she married in 1938. He belonged to a Waterford landed gentry family, the Keane baronets. The couple went on to have two daughters, Sally and Virginia. After the death of her husband in 1946, Molly moved to Ardmore, County Waterford, a place she knew well, and lived there with her two daughters. She died on 22 April 1996 in her Cliffside home in Ardmore. She was 91. She is buried beside the Church of Ireland church, near the centre of the village.

== Critical reception ==
Reviewers were generally appreciative of Keane's novels. Her mix of comic wit and poetic sensibility was called delightful. Some reviewers recoiled at the "indecent" subject of Devoted Ladies, which was a lesbian relationship between Jessica and Jane. Homosexuality was also a topic in Good Behaviour.

A reviewer in The New York Times book review in August 1991 stated that Good Behaviour may well become "a classic among English Novels". It connected her in a personal way with the famous London editor, Diana Athill, who identified strongly with Keane after reading it, insisted on editing it herself, later calling the book "mindblowingly clever."

Although the real identity of M. J. Farrell had long since become known in Irish and English literary circles, it was not until Good Behaviour that Keane felt secure in publishing under her own name. After the publication of Good Behaviour, her earlier works, including Conversation Piece and Rising Tide, were re-issued.

== Bibliography ==
=== As M. J. Farrell ===
Novels

- The Knight of Cheerful Countenance (1926)
- Young Entry (1928)
- Taking Chances (1929)
- Mad Puppetstown (1931)
- Conversation Piece (1932)
- Devoted Ladies (1934)
- Full House (1935)
- The Rising Tide (1937)
- Two Days in Aragon (1941)
- Loving Without Tears (1951)
- Treasure Hunt (1952)

Plays

- Spring Meeting (1938) — co-written with John Perry; filmed in 1941
- Ducks and Drakes (1941)
- Treasure Hunt (1949) — co-written with John Perry; the later novel is based on the play; filmed in 1952
- Dazzling Prospect (1961)

=== As Molly Keane ===
Novels

- Good Behaviour (1981)
- Time After Time (1983)
- Loving and Giving (1988) — Queen Lear in the United States
