= Conrad Burke =

Irish physicist and entrepreneur

Conrad Burke is an Irish physicist and entrepreneur.

== Early life and education ==
Born in Dublin and raised in Bray, County Wicklow, Burke attended school in Greystones. At third-level, he received a BSc in physics from University College Dublin in 1989 and an MSc in physics from Trinity College Dublin. He also attended the London Business School. He left Ireland in the late 1980s.

== Career ==
Burke began his career in 1989 as a research engineer at NEC Corporation's Central Research Laboratories in Japan. He then joined AT&T in 1992, working in engineering, marketing and product management roles. In 1999, Burke took responsibility for Lucent Technologies' integrated network modules business before joining a startup, OMM, developing optical switching subsystems. In early 2003, he became a venture partner at US venture capital firm, Sevin Rosen Funds.

In 2005, after working as senior vice-president of worldwide sales at optical components manufacturer Bookham (today Oclaro), Burke founded Innovalight, which developed silicon ink for proposed use in solar energy technology. He was the president and CEO until August 2011, when DuPont acquired the company for an undisclosed sum, although the company raised $60m. He was then general manager of DuPont Innovalight, based in Silicon Valley. For three years, Burke served on the board of SolarPower Europe - the European solar industry association.

Burke is co-founder and managing partner of MetaVC Partners, a venture capital firm based in San Francisco. In July 2021, he co-founded a fund to back start-ups working with metamaterials. The fund, which was backed by Bill Gates and former Microsoft chief technology officer Nathan Myhrvold, made early investments in telecommunications company Mangata Networks and in Neurophos, which uses metamaterials to build optical processors.

== Awards ==
Burke has been a recipient of the Technology Pioneer Award at the World Economic Forum and an Ernst & Young Entrepreneur of the Year Award. In 2022, he received the UCD Alumni Award in Science.
