= Raheen-a-Cluig =

- Raheenac[h]luig Church, Raheen na gClig, Raheen na Clig
- Ráithín an Chloig
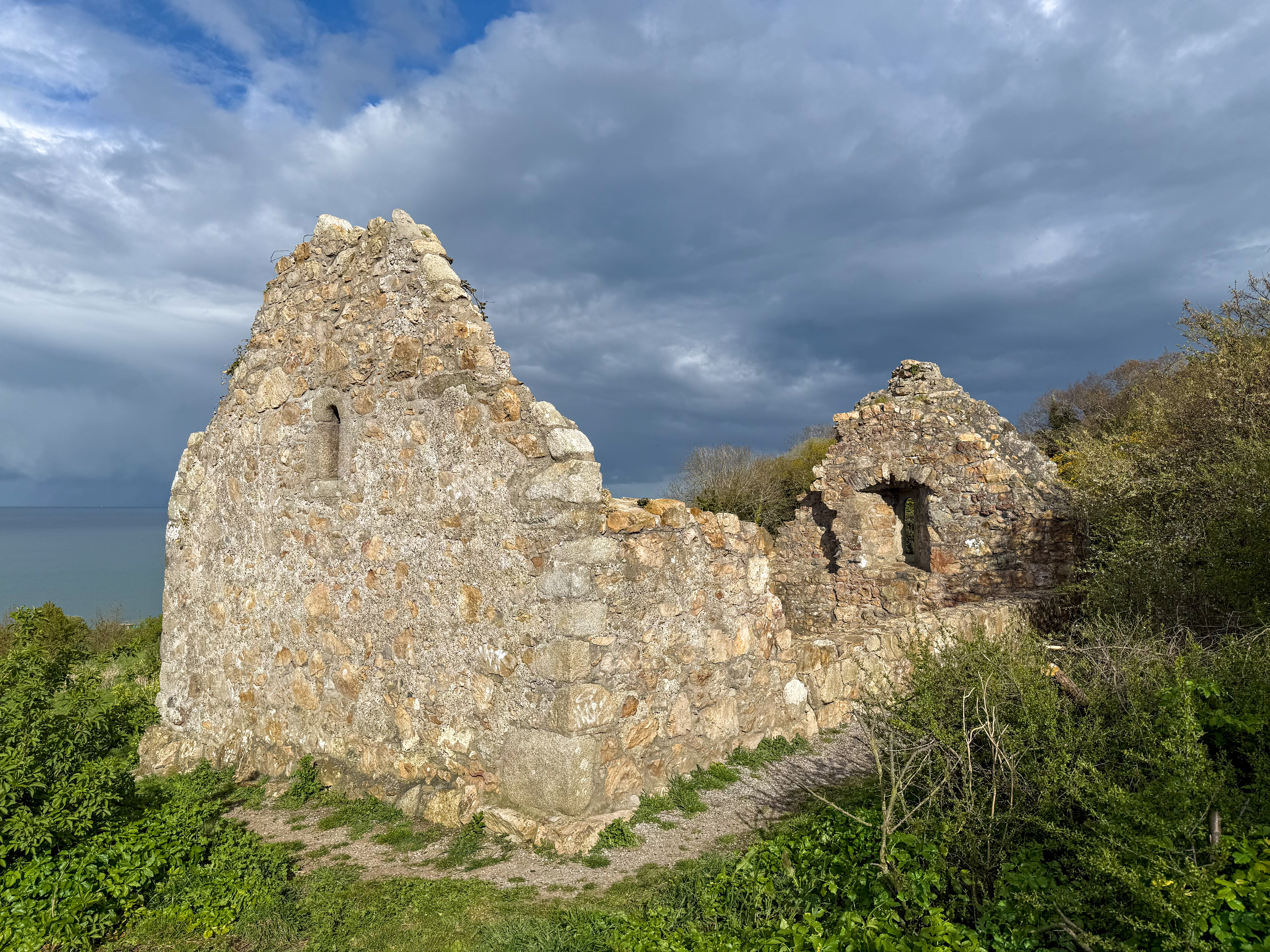
- Raheen-a-Cluig in 2026

- Location within Ireland
- 53.193786°N 6.090484°W
- Location: Newcourt, Bray, County Wicklow
- Country: Ireland
- Denomination: Pre-Reformation Catholic

History
- Founded: c. 1200
- Dedication: St Michael or St Brendan

Architecture
- Functional status: ruined
- Style: Norman
- Years built: 13th century

Specifications
- Length: 12.5 m (41 ft)
- Width: 5.3 m (17 ft)
- Height: 2 m (6 ft 7 in)
- Materials: stone

Administration
- Diocese: Dublin

National monument of Ireland
- Official name: Raheenachluig (Bray)
- Reference no.: 262

Raheen-a-Cluig is a medieval church and National Monument in Bray, County Wicklow, Ireland.

== Location ==
Raheen-a-Cluig lies on the north face of Bray Head in Raheen Park, about 300 m (330 yd) south of the beach, with a commanding view over the coastline.

== History ==
c. 1875 photo with Bray promenade in background

Raheen-a-Cluig is believed to have been built in the 12th–13th century AD. The name derives from the Irish Ráithín an Chloig. This would mean "little fort of the bell", but there is no sign of a fort. Ráithín can also refer to a wall of built-up sods of turf, or it could be a version of raithean, "ferny area". It was given to the Augustines by the then prominent Archbold family. It may have been dedicated to St Michael or St Brendan.

It was partially restored in the 18th century. Over the years it has also been used as a hideout by smugglers, and it associated with various ghost stories.

== Church ==
The ruins have a doorway in the northeast wall which would have originally held a strong timber door, and round-headed windows in the east and west gables.

There were two smaller buildings close by and so is an enclosure: probably a cillín: a burial ground for suicides, shipwrecked sailors, strangers, unrepentant murderers and unbaptised babies.

About a 400 m (¼ mile) southeast of the church there was a holy well, known as Patrick’s Well. This was still used in the 1830s, mostly by invalids.
