= Good Behaviour (Keane novel) =

1981 novel by Molly Keane

Published by Molly Keane in 1981, Good Behaviour tells a story of Anglo-Irish society in the early twentieth century. Narrated by the daughter of the St. Charles family, Aroon, nothing is as it seems. A cold mother, a philandering father, a gay brother and a similarly inclined love interest all unseen or excused by the society focused upon good behaviour. The book was nominated for the Booker Prize and has been adapted for television and radio (1996).

== Plot ==
Living with her ailing mother and Rose, their faithful servant, Aroon St. Charles reflects on her childhood as a member of the Irish gentry.

Aroon is especially close with her governess, Mrs Brock. Before teaching Aroon, Mrs Brock worked for the Massingham family. She is dismissed after it becomes clear she is coddling their eldest son, Richard, who begins to take an interest in poetry. Mrs Brock then goes to work for the St. Charles family where she attracts the notice of Aroon's father. Mrs. Brock eventually commits suicide by drowning.

During WWI Aroon's father becomes an amputee. Initially humbled, he begins to flagrantly have affairs which her mother turns a blind eye to. During this time Aroon becomes a young woman and is expected to socialize. Though she is awkward, tall and buxom her entry into society is eased by her younger brother Hubert who introduces her to a now adult Richard. Richard, Hubert and Aroon form a close knit trio though Aroon suspects the two men of being close in a way that leaves her out. The night before they are to leave Richard visits Aroon in bed but does not have sex with her.

On the car trip away Hubert dies. In grief, Richard is sent to Africa though Aroon holds out hope he will return and marry her.

The family meanwhile denies their grief and any mention of Hubert. Circumstances become even more difficult when the family begins to suffer extreme financial instability and are denied food on credit. Aroon's father has a stroke and becomes bed bound. Aroon dismisses the nurse hired to help him after the nurse catches Rose, the cook, giving him a handjob.

The family becomes increasingly isolated in grief and further poverty. Aroon finally receives one invitation to a hunting ball. While there she comes across a copy of Tatler in which she learns Richard has returned from Africa and is engaged.

Aroon's father dies. Richard's father, Major Massingham comes down to the funeral and informs Aroon that Richard is no longer engaged as he has run off with a man.

At the funeral Aroon fears that her life will be controlled by the tyranny of her mother and Rose. To everyone's surprise however Aroon's father has manipulated her mother into giving her family estate, Temple Alice, over to him. Upon his death he bequeaths it to Aroon who now realizes she has complete control over her mother.

== Publication history ==
Though far from Keane's first novel, Good Behaviour was the first to be published under her real name. It followed a near 30 year hiatus from publishing following the death of her husband.

The book was first published in 1981 by André Deutsch. Since then it has continued to be in print with re-issues by Virago Press and NYRB Classics.

== Adaptations ==
=== Film and television ===
The BBC aired a three part miniseries in 1983. dramatised by Hugh Leonard and directed by Bill Hays, Joanna McCallum starred as Aroon with Hannah Gordon (as Mother), Daniel Massey (as Major), Judy Cornwell (as Mrs Brock), Patricia Quinn (as Rose), Timothy Sinclair (as Hubert), and Robert Burbage (as Richard) co-starring.
