= Ducks and Drakes (play) =

English comedy play

- Written by: Molly Keane
- Original language: English
- Genre: Comedy

Premiere
- Date premiered: 17 November 1941
- Place premiered: Theatre Royal, Bath

Ducks and Drakes is a 1941 comedy play by the Irish writer Molly Keane. The plot revolves around the wives of three brothers, all living on a farm while their husbands are away due to the war.

It premiered at the Theatre Royal, Bath before transferring to the West End. It ran for 23 performances at the Apollo Theatre, directed by John Gielgud, with a cast that included Judy Campbell, Ronald Squire, Nora Swinburne, Kathleen Harrison, Mary Jerrold and Lilian Braithwaite.

== Bibliography ==
- Wearing, J.P. The London Stage 1940-1949: A Calendar of Productions, Performers, and Personnel. Rowman & Littlefield, 2014.
