= Bray, County Wicklow =

Town in County Wicklow, Ireland

Bray Bré (Irish)
- Town
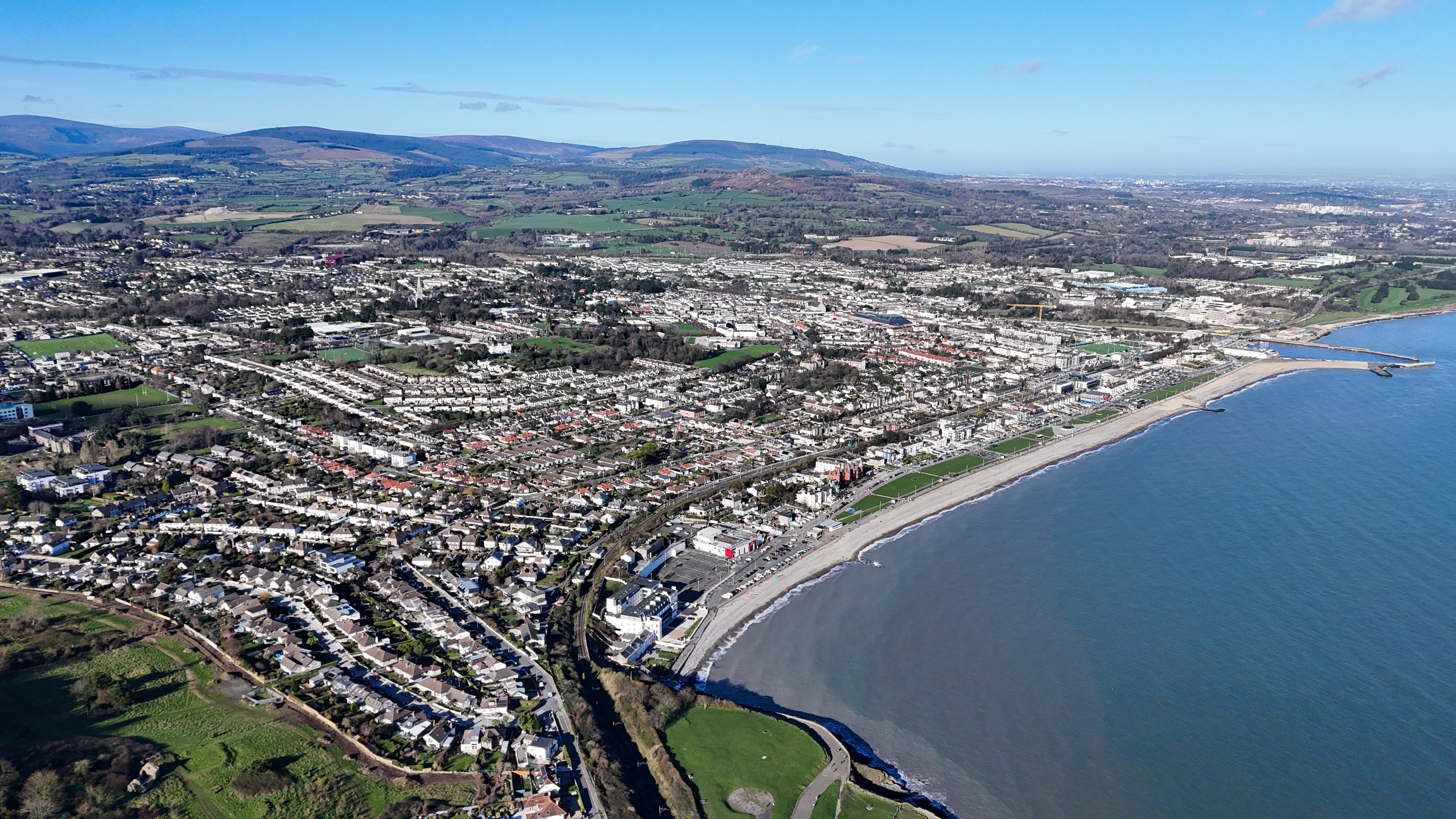
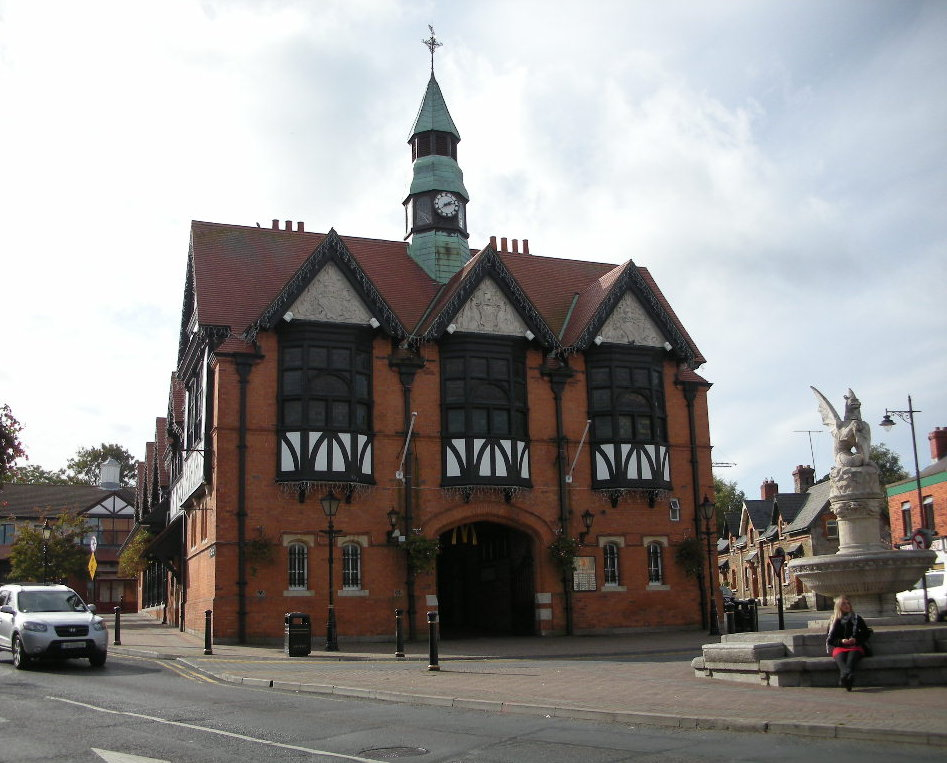
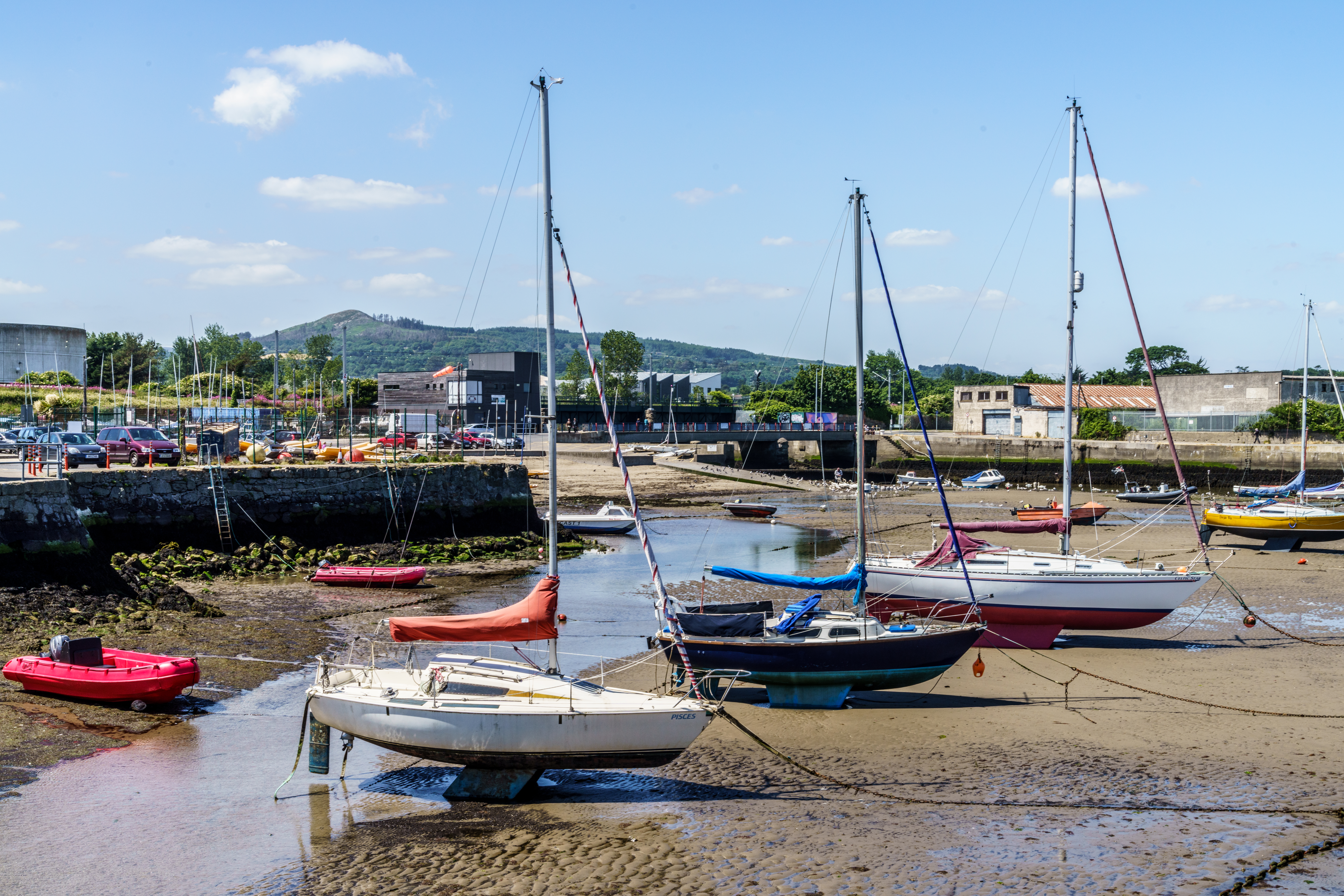
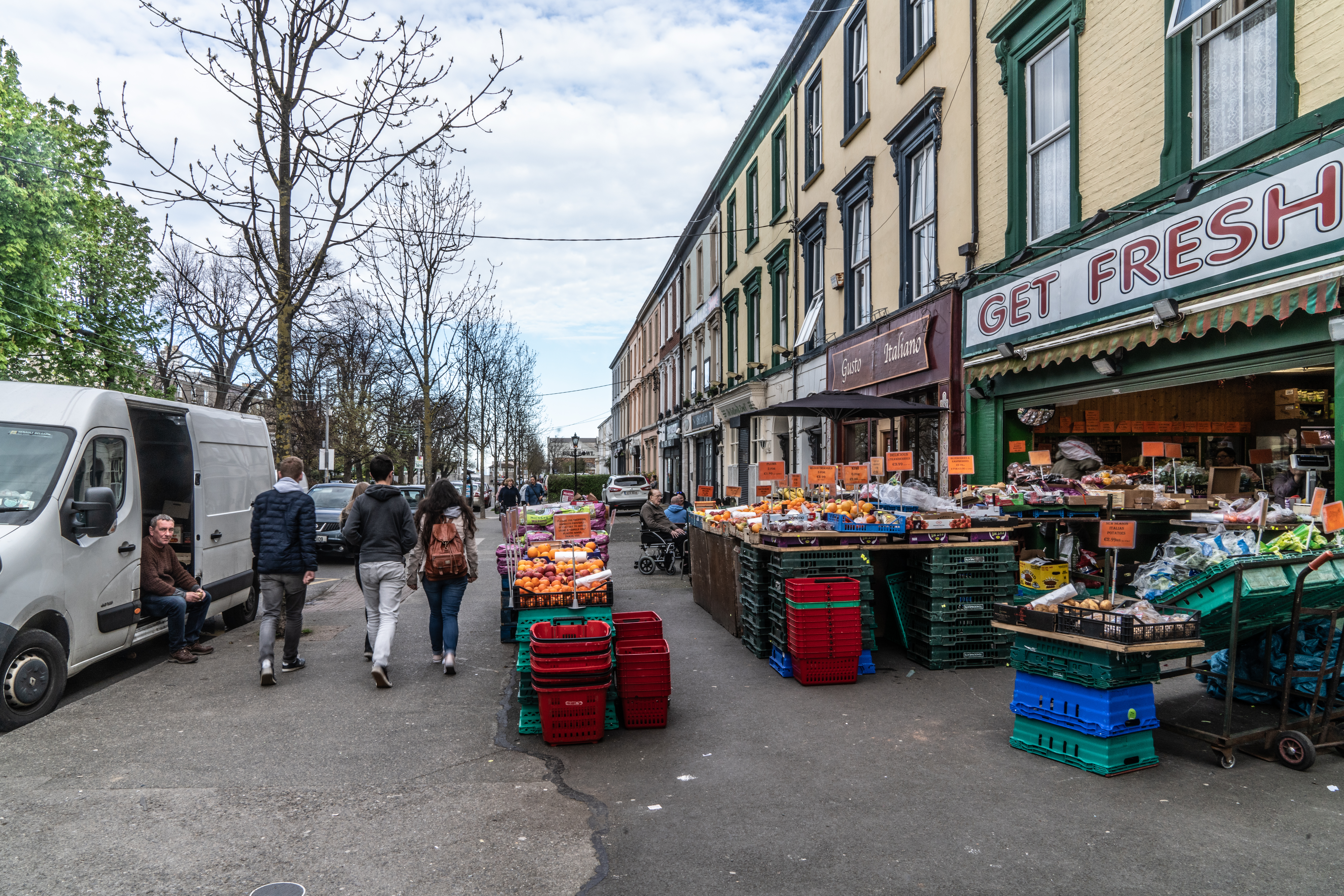
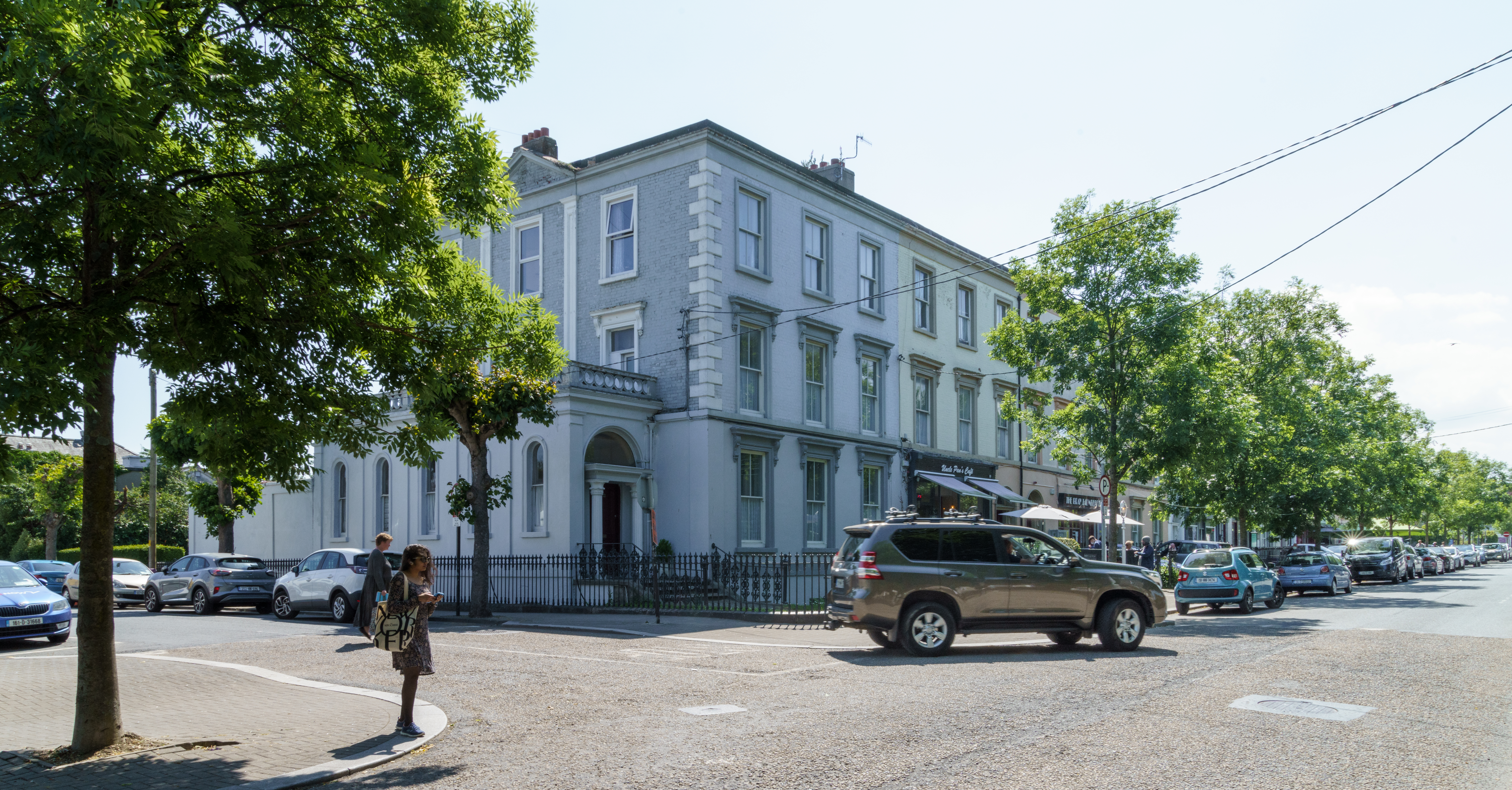
- Town skyline Bray Town Hall Boats in Bray Harbour Businesses on Goldsmith Terrace Period terraced homes on Quinsborough Road

- Coat of arms

- Location in Ireland Bray (Europe)
- Coordinates: 53°12′05″N 06°06′39″W
- Country: Ireland
- Province: Leinster
- County: County Wicklow, County Dublin

Government
  - Dáil constituency: Wicklow, Dún Laoghaire
  - EP constituency: South

Area
  - Total: 9.9 km^{2} (3.8 sq mi)
- Elevation: 18 m (59 ft)

Population (2022)
  - Total: 33,512
  - Rank: 10th
  - Density: 3,398/km^{2} (8,800/sq mi)
- Time zone: UTC+0 (WET)
  - Summer (DST): UTC+1 (IST (WEST))
- Eircode routing key: A98
- Area code: 01 (+3531)
- Irish Grid Reference: O264185
- Website: www.bray.ie

Bray (Irish: Bré [bʲɾʲeː]) is a coastal town in north County Wicklow, Ireland. It is situated about 20 km (12 mi) south of Dublin city centre on the east coast, and parts of the town's northern outskirts are in County Dublin. It has a population of 33,512 making it the tenth largest urban area within Ireland (as of the 2022 census). Bray is home to Ardmore Studios, and some light industry is located in the town, with some business and retail parks on its southern periphery. Commuter links between Bray and Dublin are provided by rail, Dublin Bus, and the M11 and M50 motorways. The town is in a townland and civil parish of the same name.

Originally developed as a planned resort town in the 19th century, Bray's popularity as a seaside resort was serviced by the Dublin and Kingstown Railway, which was extended to Bray in 1854. During the late 20th century, the town's use as a resort declined when foreign travel became an option for holiday-makers.

== Etymology ==
The name Bray is an anglicisation of the Irish Bré, whose meaning is unclear. Liam Price suggested it may be an old name for the River Dargle or a tributary. In 1875 P. W. Joyce mistakenly ascribed the Irish name Brí, an old word meaning "hill", referring in this case to Bray Head. In a 1905 Gaelic League publication advocating use of Irish-language postal addresses, Seosamh Laoide coined the name Brí Cualann "Brí in Cualu", as part of his policy that "If the name of the town [in Irish] be one word, the [ancient Gaelic] territory should be added to it in the genitive case". Brí and Brí C[h]ualann remained in use in the mid 20th century despite having been refuted by Liam Price and Osborn Bergin. Bré was adopted by statute in 1975.

== History ==
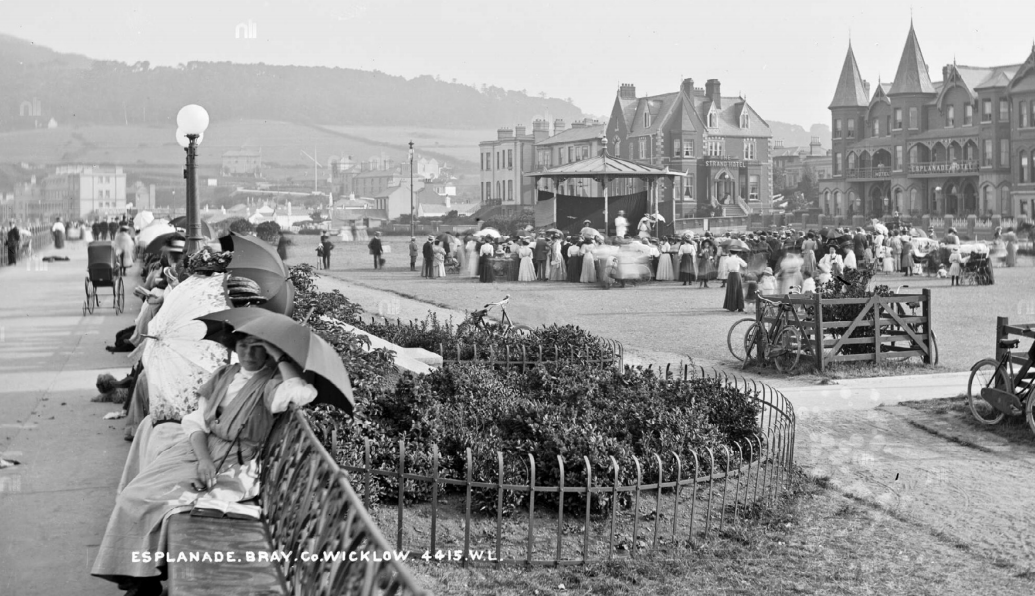
Tourists along the Bray esplanade, c. 1900

During the medieval period of Irish history, Bray was situated on the southern border of the Pale, and the coastal district was governed directly by the English crown from Dublin Castle. Inland, the countryside was largely under the control of Gaelic Chieftains, such as the O'Toole and O'Byrne clans. Bray features on the 1598 map "A Modern Depiction of Ireland, One of the British Isles" by Abraham Ortelius as "Brey". William Brabazon, 1st Earl of Meath purchased the Killruddery Estate in Bray in 1627 with the establishment of the Earl title.

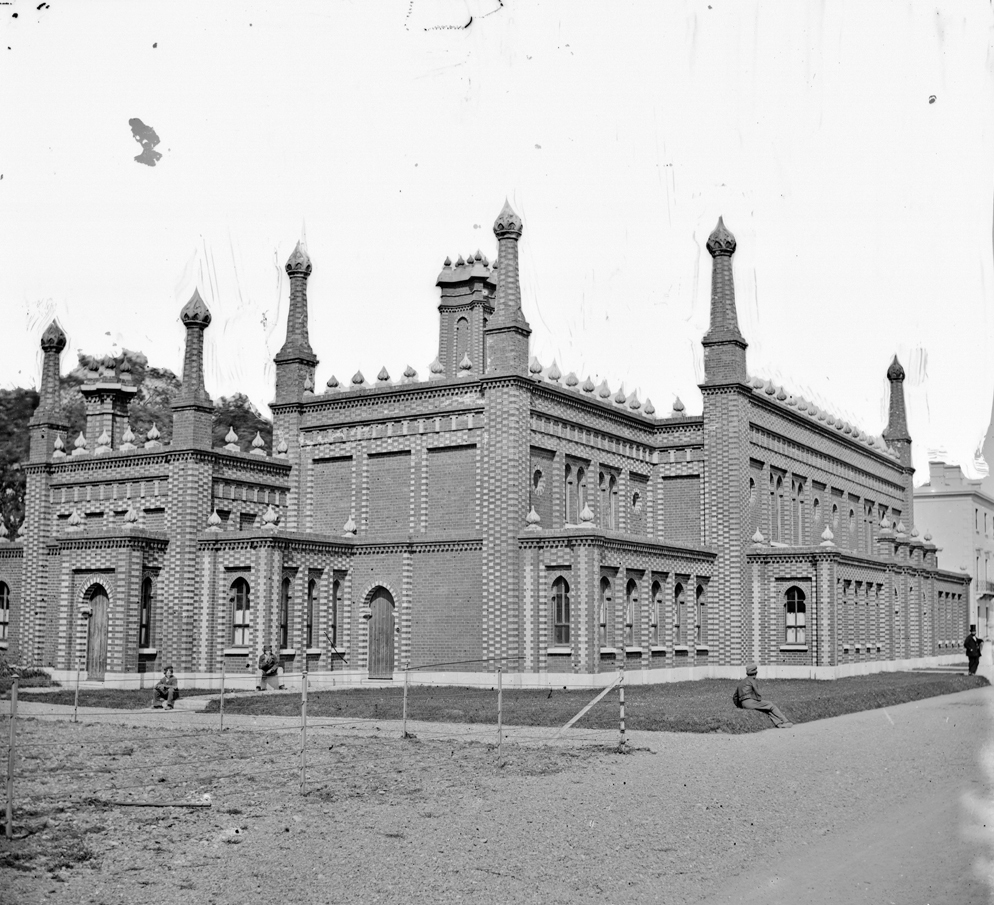
Bray's Victorian Turkish Baths from the town's heyday as a seaside resort.

The Dublin and Kingstown Railway, the first in Ireland, opened in 1834 and was extended as far as Bray in 1854. With the coming of the railway in the mid-19th century, the town grew to become a seaside resort. It was developed primarily by local entrepreneurs as a planned resort town, modelled on the seaside resorts of the English south-coast, specifically Brighton. Hotels and residential terraces were built in the vicinity of the seafront. Railway entrepreneur William Dargan developed Victorian Turkish baths, designed by architect and sculptor Richard Barter in a Moorish style at a cost of £10,000. They opened in 1859 and were demolished in 1980, though the baths closed long before that.

Bray was a popular destination from the 1860s onwards. While small amenities such as regattas, firework displays and band performances were plentiful in the town, Bray failed to secure the necessary capital to develop major attractions and sustain tourism, leading to its decline in the early 1900s. Pleasure piers such as the Palace Pier were a mainstay of resorts at that time. Despite repeated efforts, Bray never acquired such a pier and abandoned plans to build one in 1906. Additional planned amenities which were never built included a concert hall, a theatre, an exhibition centre, a marine aquarium, winter gardens and an electrified tramway along the seafront. It experienced a brief revival from British tourists in the years immediately after World War II. However, Bray's popularity as a seaside resort declined significantly when foreign travel became an option for holiday-makers. Its proximity to Dublin still makes it a popular destination for day-trippers from the capital.

== Location ==
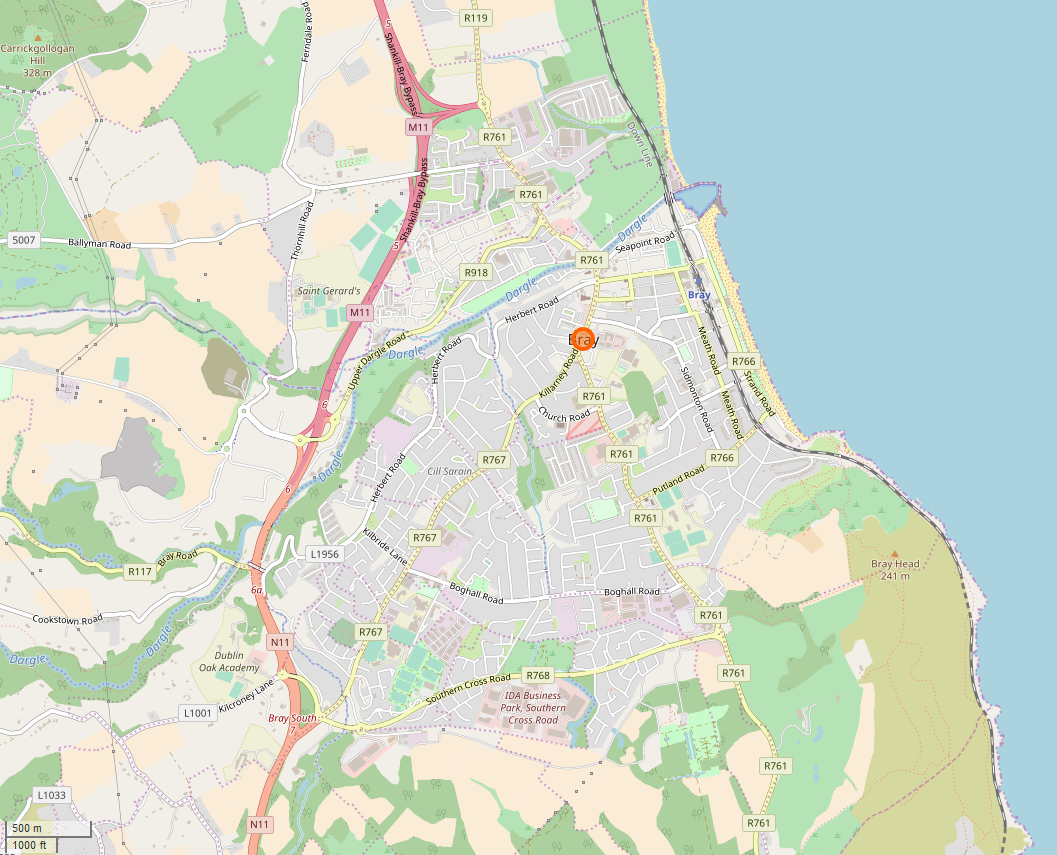
Map of Bray

The town is situated on the east coast to the south of County Dublin. Shankill, County Dublin lies to the north, and Greystones, County Wicklow to the south. The village of Enniskerry lies to the west of the town, at the foot of the Wicklow Mountains. People participate in such sports as sailing, rowing, and swimming. The beach and seafront promenade are used by residents and visitors. While Bray's promenade and south beach is to a Blue Flag standard, the north beach has been affected by erosion and the leaching of a variety of toxic chemicals – including asbestos, rusted metal, plastics, and bricks – into the groundwater since the closure and sale of the former Bray Urban Council municipal landfill, immediately beside the beach, containing 200,000 tonnes or 104,000 cubic metres of waste. The dump was closed in 1968 and sold to Woodbrook golf club in 1992. By 2017, plans were being discussed to deal with the situation.

The River Dargle which enters the sea at the north end of Bray rises from a source near Djouce, in the Wicklow Mountains. Bray Head is situated at the southern end of the Victorian Promenade with paths leading to the summit and along the sea cliffs. The rocks of Bray Head are a mixture of greywackes and quartzite. There is a large cross at the summit.

=== Climate ===
Bray has a temperate oceanic climate (Köppen: Cfb), similar to most other towns in Ireland, with few extremes of temperature and abundant precipitation year round. However, Bray is relatively sheltered from the prevailing south-westerly winds by the Wicklow Mountains and receives around 750 mm (30 in) of rainfall per year. The sunniest months on average are May and June, while October is by far the wettest.

Average sea temperature in Bray, County Wicklow
	Jan	Feb	Mar	Apr	May	Jun	Jul	Aug	Sep	Oct	Nov	Dec
Average Max (°C)	11 °C (52 °F)	10 °C (50 °F)	10 °C (50 °F)	11 °C (52 °F)	13 °C (55 °F)	15 °C (59 °F)	18 °C (64 °F)	17 °C (63 °F)	17 °C (63 °F)	16 °C (61 °F)	14 °C (57 °F)	13 °C (55 °F)
Average Min (°C)	8 °C (46 °F)	7 °C (45 °F)	7 °C (45 °F)	7 °C (45 °F)	8 °C (46 °F)	11 °C (52 °F)	12 °C (54 °F)	14 °C (57 °F)	13 °C (55 °F)	13 °C (55 °F)	11 °C (52 °F)	10 °C (50 °F)

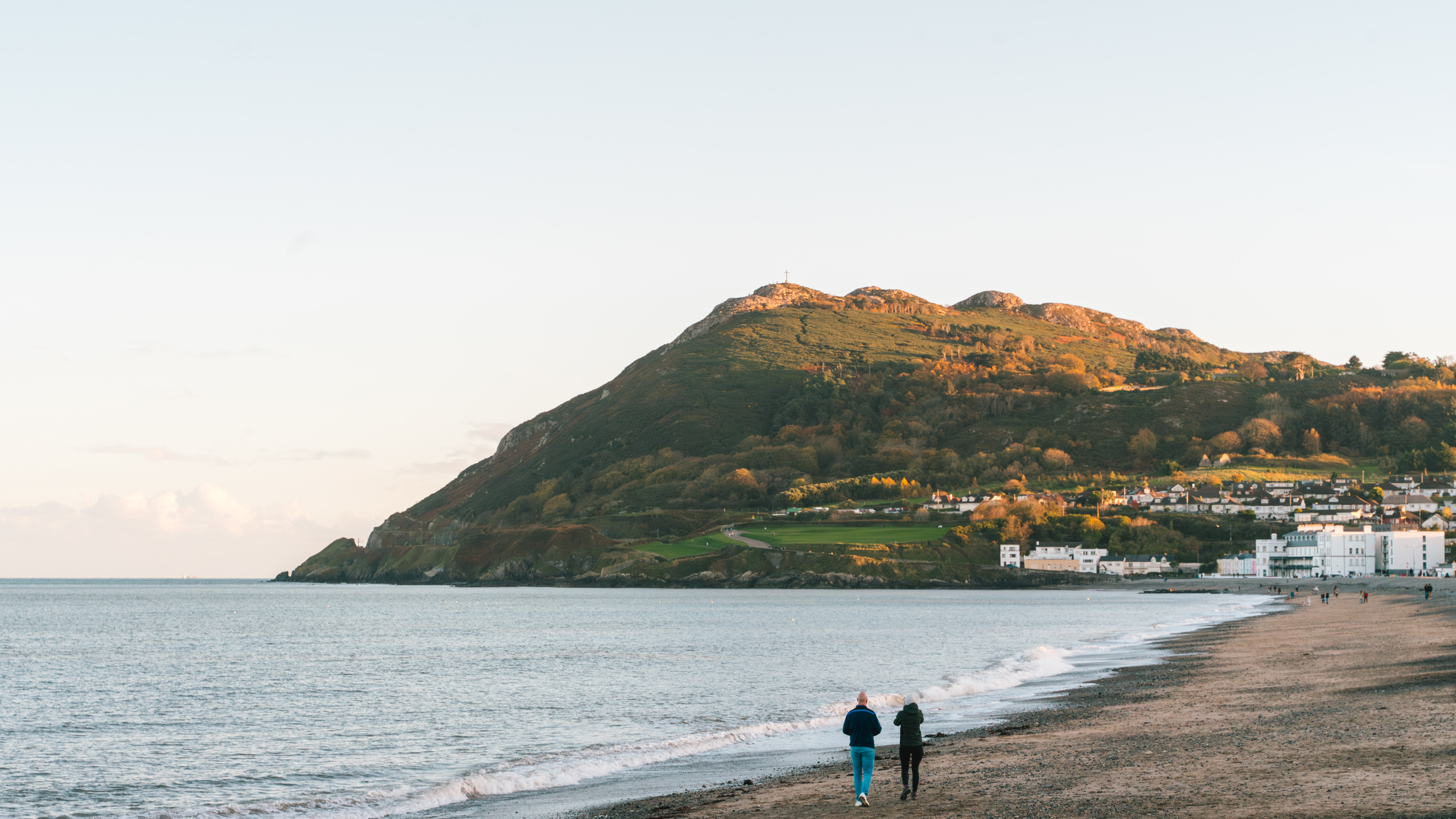
Seafront and Bray Head

== Access ==
=== Rail ===
A public transport network, both north into Dublin and south into County Wicklow and County Wexford, serves the town. Bray is on the Irish Rail DART Rail Network which stretches north to Malahide and Howth and south to Greystones. The town is also on the mainline InterCity and Commuter rail network which connects north to Connolly Station in Dublin city centre and further to Drogheda and Dundalk. To the south, the rail line goes through Arklow and Gorey before reaching Rosslare Europort. Bray's railway station is named after Edward Daly, an executed leader of the 1916 Easter Rising. Bray Station was opened on 10 July 1854. The Dublin and South Eastern Railway had two lines out from Bray into Dublin, the coastal line (formerly known as the Kingstown and Bray branch line) and the Harcourt Street line. The latter was closed in 1958 but most of it has been reopened as part of the Luas Green Line, which is proposed for an extension to Bray.

=== Road ===
Bray lies along the M11 motorway corridor; an interchange at its northern side links with the M50 Dublin bypass.

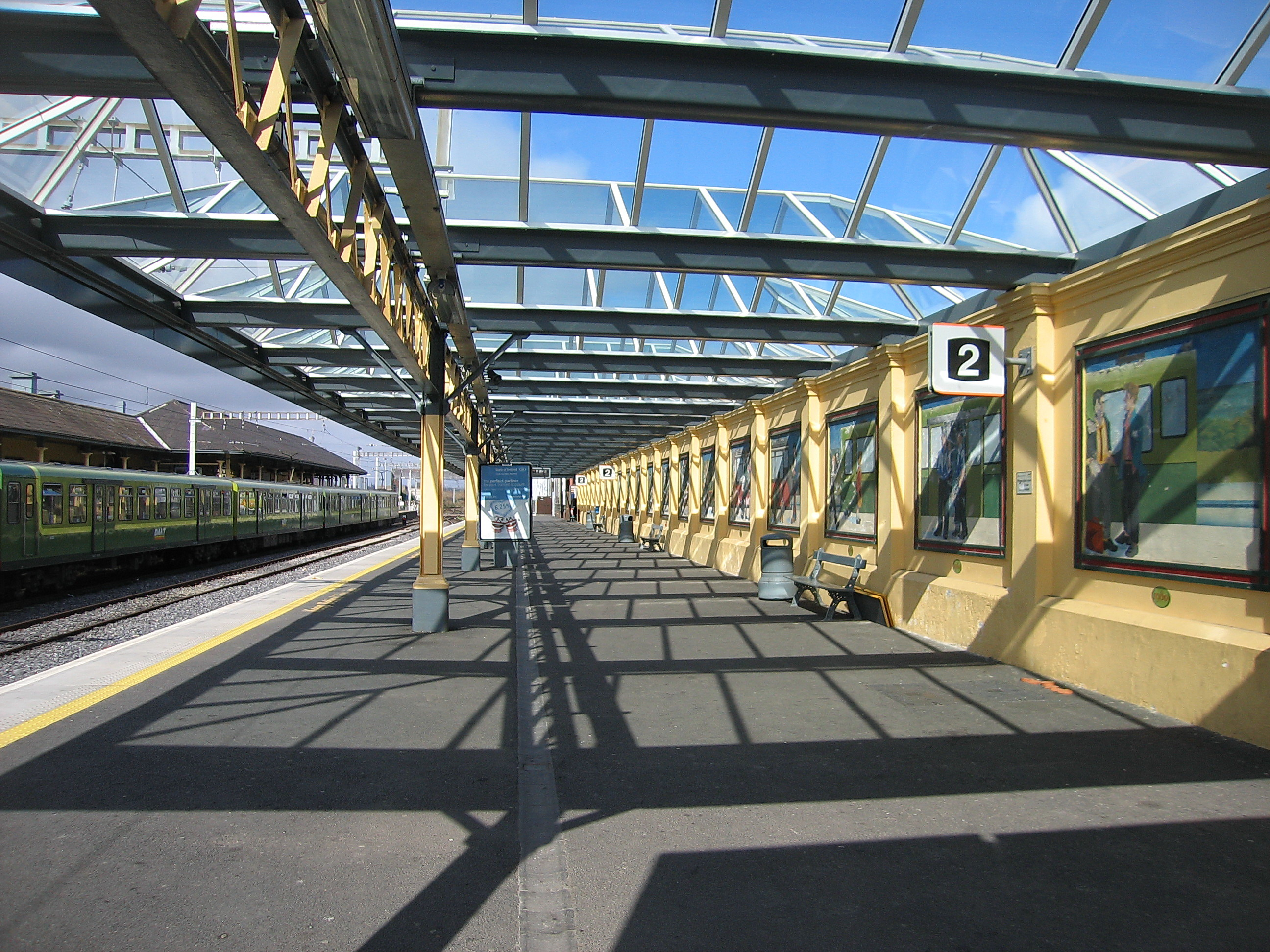
Bray Daly railway station.

Several bus companies pass through Bray: Dublin Bus, Go-Ahead Ireland, Bus Éireann, Aircoach, and St. Kevin's Bus Service to Glendalough. Dublin Bus and Go-Ahead Ireland are the two primary bus operators in the town operating service on behalf of the NTA. Bus services serving the town include the E1 which is routed from Ballywaltrim, just south of Bray, to Northwood via UCD and Dublin city centre. Other routes include the 45A/B, 84N, 131, 181, 185t, L1, L2, L12, L14, X1, and X2.

Wexford Bus also offer services to the village of Kilmacanogue, just to the south of Bray, with routes 740/A/X and UM11. Bus Éireann's routes 133 also serves Kilmacanogue, while route 131 stops at both Bray and Kilmacanogue.

Finnegan Bray formerly offered two local town services (routes 143 and 144, which finished on the 24th of January 2025, becoming part of route L14) as well as a night bus service from Dublin (route 984N), however, this was suspended in March 2020 due to Covid restrictions. It was discontinued in late 2022, with the company blaming "unfair competition from state subsidised services" in a Facebook post.

=== Air ===
Dublin Airport is reachable by car via the M50, which passes to the west of Dublin City. Newcastle Aerodrome is the closest private airfield a short distance south of Bray.

== Demography ==
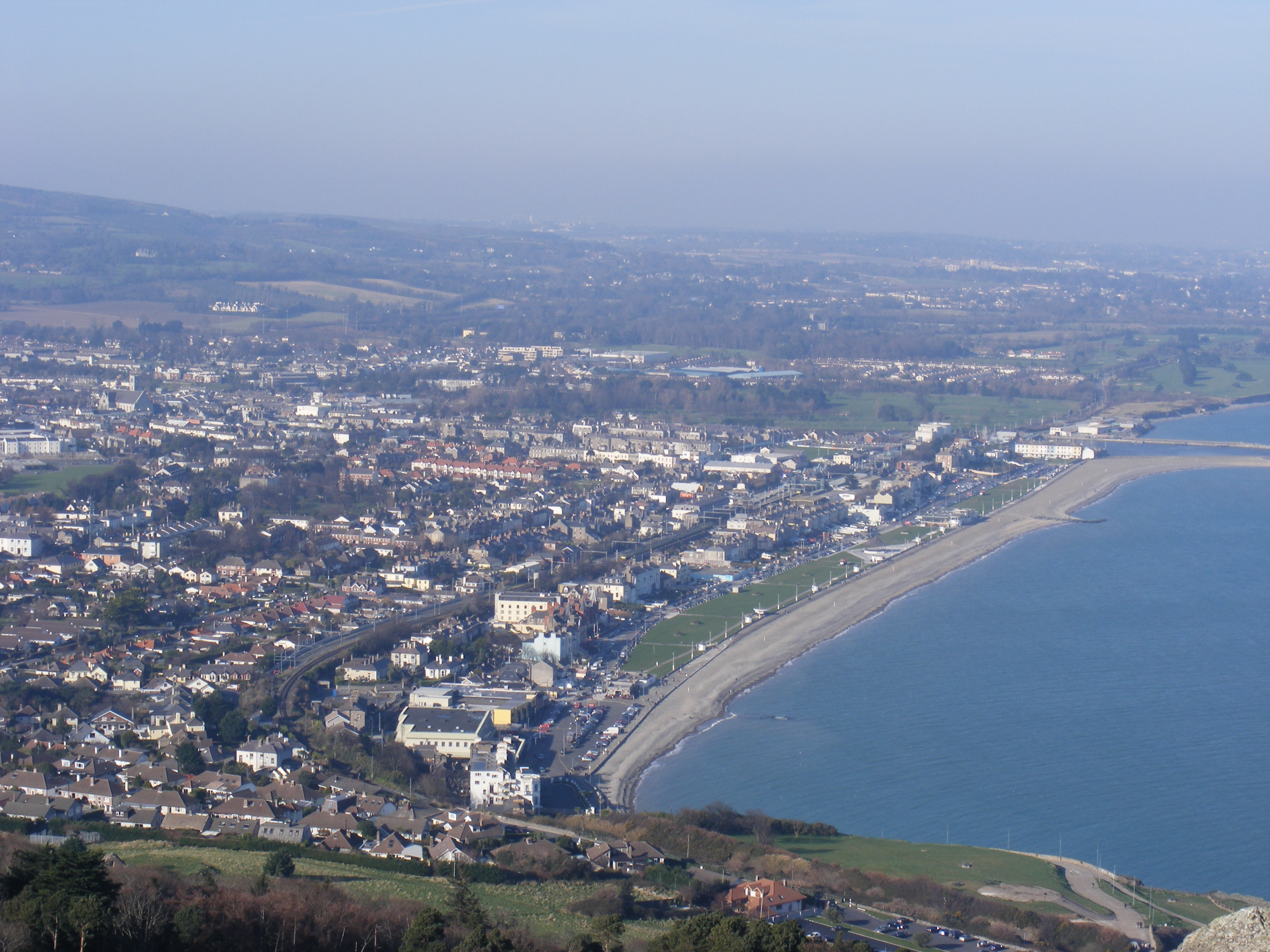
An aerial view of Bray

According to the 2022 census, the population of Bray was 153,988. The majority of residents were born in Ireland (128,091) and held Irish citizenship (135,794), with smaller numbers born in the United Kingdom, Poland, India and other EU states.

By ethnicity, the population in 2022 was predominantly White Irish (125,699), with other groups including White Irish Travellers (887), Other White (13,867), Asian or Asian Irish (3,835), Black or Black Irish (844), and other ethnicities (2,380). A total of 6,476 persons did not state their ethnicity.

Historical population
Year	Pop.	±%
1991	26,953	—
1996	27,923	+3.6%
2002	30,951	+10.8%
2006	31,901	+3.1%
2011	31,872	−0.1%
2016	32,600	+2.3%
2022	33,512	+2.8%

== Local government ==
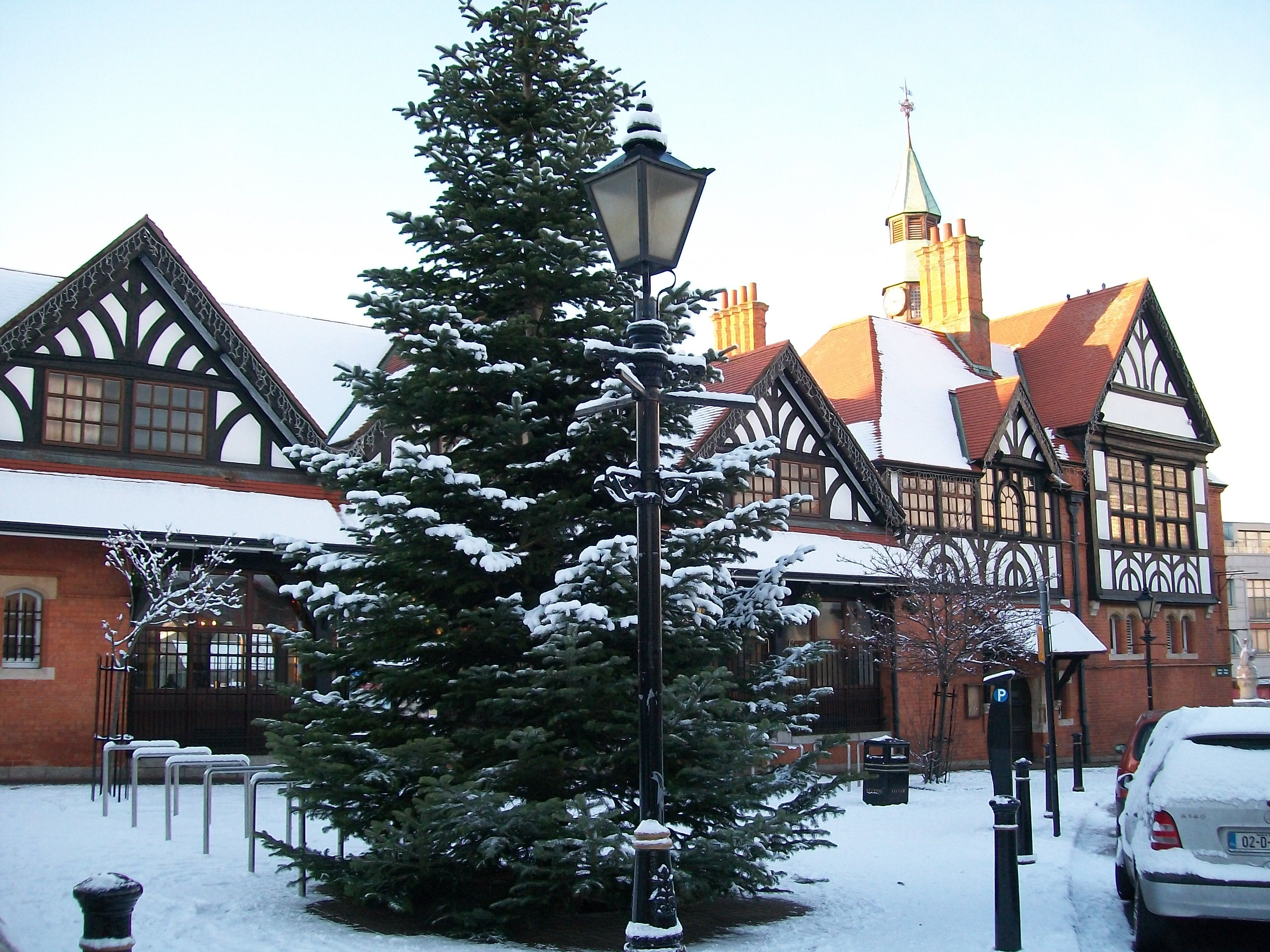
Bray Town Hall

Bray is represented on Wicklow County Council by two local electoral areas. Bray East (4 seats) is approximately two-thirds of the town, while Bray West (4 seats) is the other third and includes the neighbouring villages of Enniskerry and Kilmacanogue. The electoral divisions of Bray East are Bray No. 1 Urban, Bray No. 2 Urban, Bray No. 3 Urban and Rathmichael (Bray). The electoral divisions of Bray West are Enniskerry, Kilmacanoge and Powerscourt. Bray Municipal District consists of both of these local electoral areas.

The Bray Town Commissioners were established by a local act in 1866. The Earl of Meath was named in the act as the first chairman of the commissioners. In 1899, this body became an urban district council under the Local Government (Ireland) Act 1898. At the same time, a portion of the town which had been in County Dublin was transferred to County Wicklow and the jurisdiction of the urban district. The boundary of the town was further extended in 1952 (taking in the area around Killruddery), in 1958 (taking in the area in Rathmichael which had been transferred the previous year from County Dublin to County Wicklow), and in 1978 (extending the town to the west).

The urban district council became a town council in 2002. It was abolished by the Local Government Reform Act 2014, with the powers and functions of the town council given to the county council, but its functions could be administered by the new municipal district council created by the act.

Part of the northern Bray area lies within the local authority area of Dún Laoghaire–Rathdown, and forms part of the Shankill–Killiney local electoral area. The border between County Wicklow and County Dublin (Dún Laoghaire–Rathdown) lies along Old Connaught Avenue and runs down along and across the Dublin Road to Ravenswell, making all areas north of that line Bray, County Dublin.

== Tourism ==
Bray is a long-established holiday resort dating back to the early 19th century. The Parliamentary gazetteer of 1846 described it thusly:

The town has for many years been a favourite summer resort of the wealthier of the Dublin citizens and of the gentry from a large part of Ireland; and it possesses, in a state of high facility and polish, the various appliances required for their accommodation and comfort, whether as lodgers or as tourists. Handsome cottages ornees, boarding houses on different scales of economy, and furnished houses from the small abode to the luxurious mansion, abound both in the town and in its environs, for the special use of visitors.

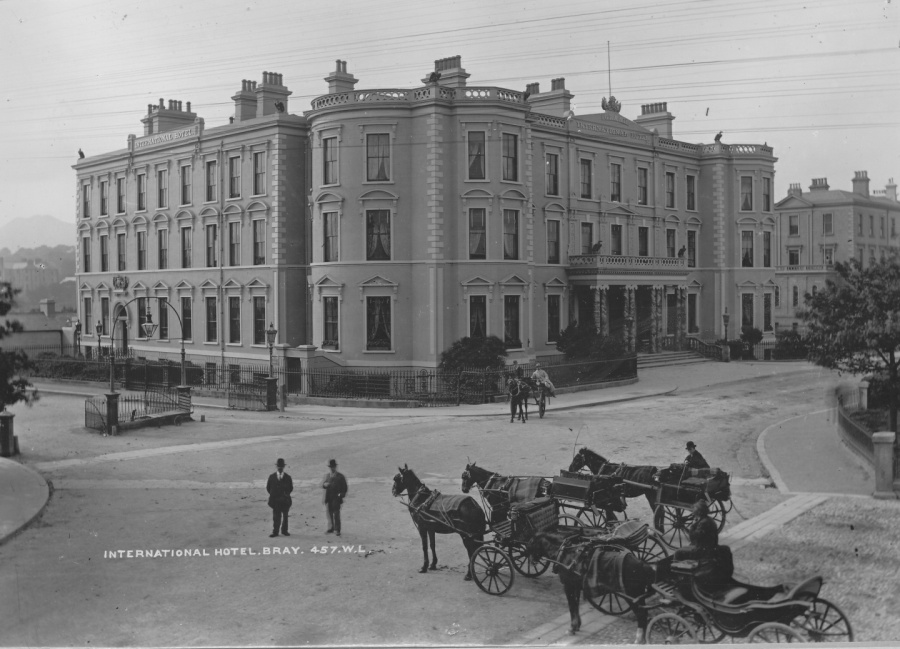
The International Hotel from Bray's heyday as a seaside resort. Designed by architect Edmund O'Kelly, opened in 1862, and destroyed in the fire of 1974.

Bray has numerous hotels and guesthouses, shops, restaurants and evening entertainment. The town also hosts a number of festival events. In the town's vicinity are an 18-hole golf courses, a tennis club, fishing, a sailing club and horse riding. Other features of Bray are the amusement arcades and the National Sealife Centre. It has a beach of sand and shingle which is over 1.6 km (1 mi) long, fronted by an esplanade and Bray Head, which rises 241 m (791 ft) from the coast, has views of mountains and sea. The concrete cross at the top of Bray head was erected in 1950 for the holy year.

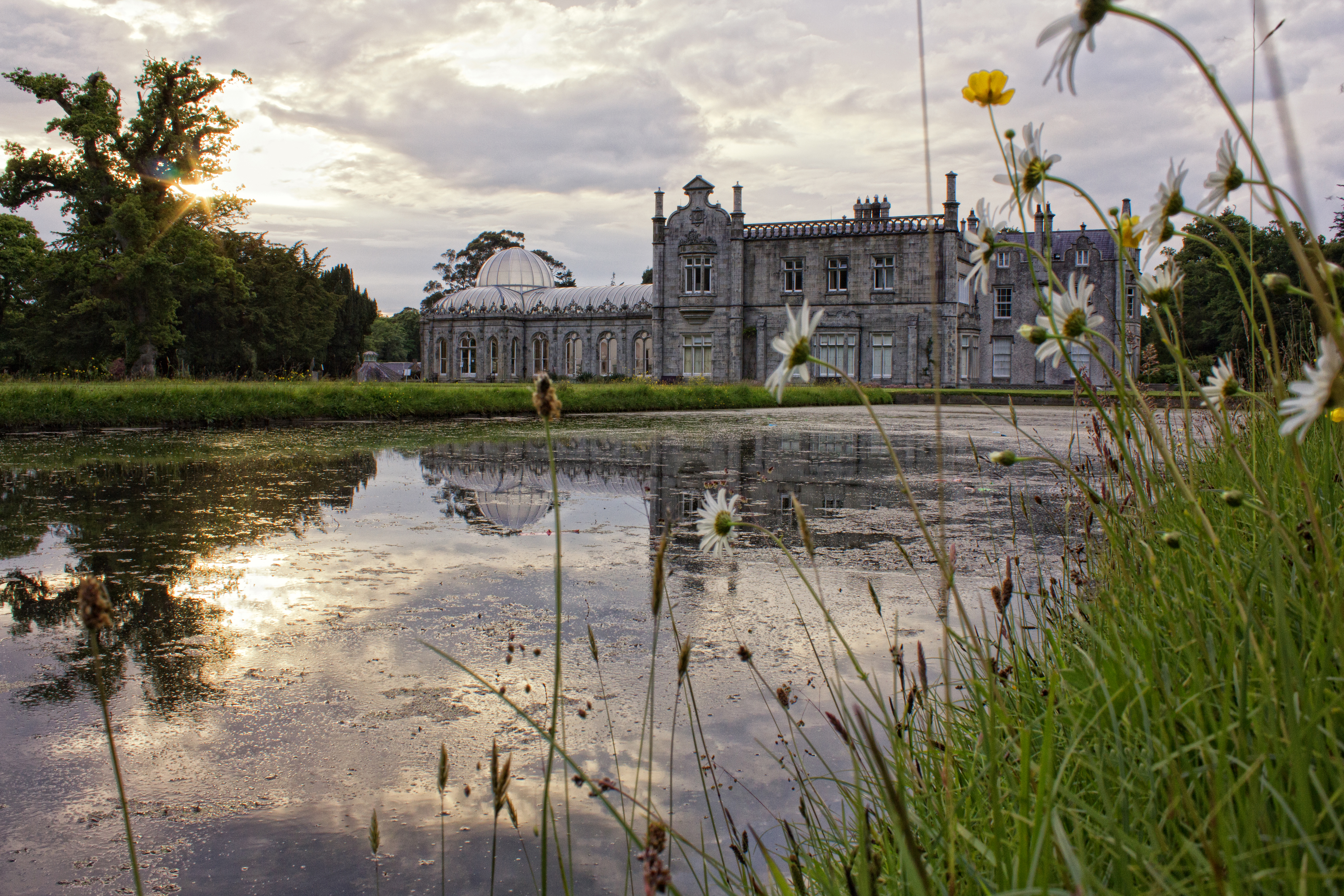
Killruddery House, an Elizabethan-Revival mansion built in the 1820s.

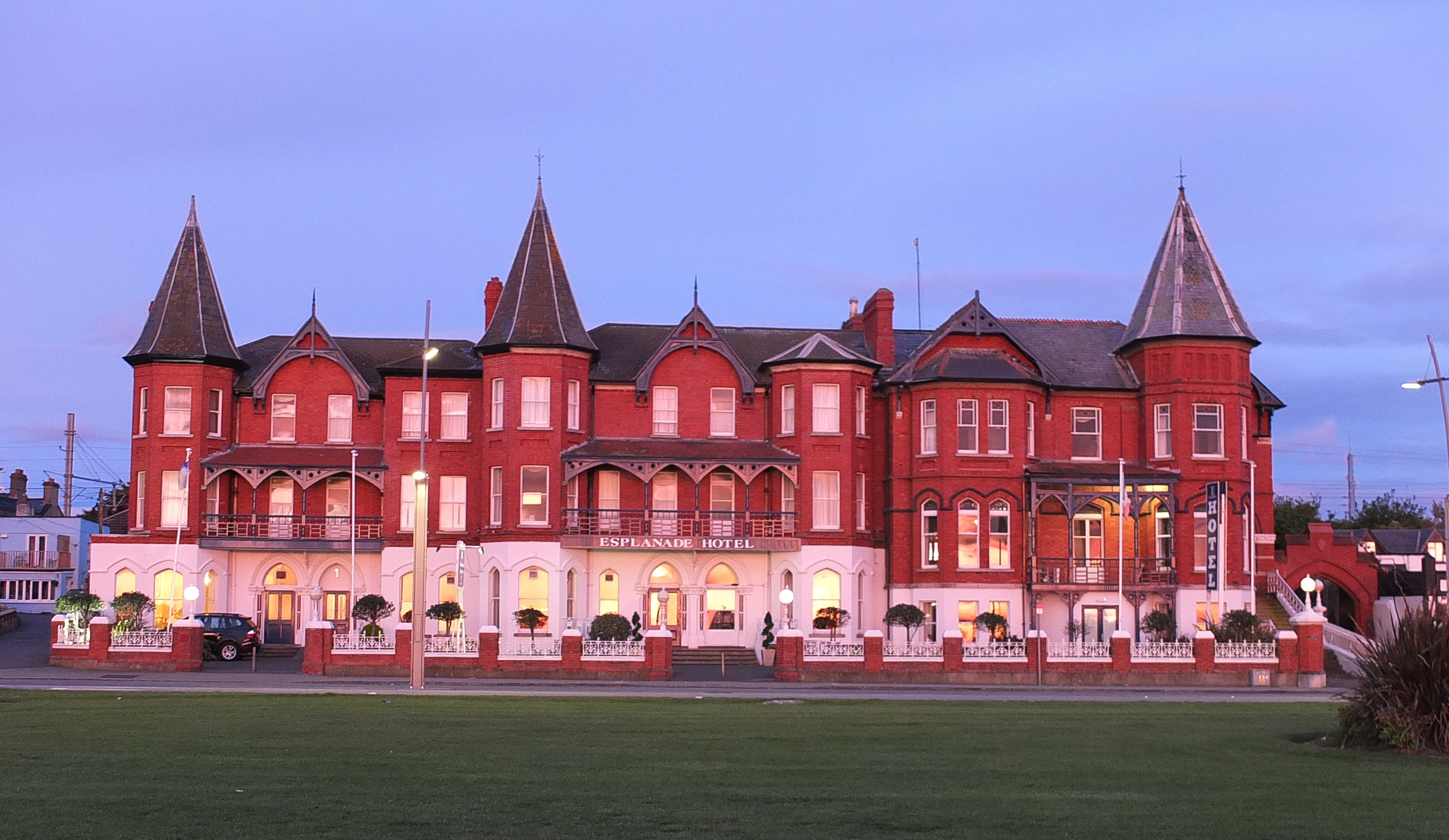
Bray's Esplanade Hotel was built in 1900.

Bray is used as a base for walkers, and has a 1.5 km-long (1 mi) promenade which stretches from the harbour, with its colony of mute swans, to the base of Bray Head at the southern end. A track leads to the summit. Also used by walkers is the seven km (4 1/2 mi) Cliff Walk along Bray Head out to Greystones.

In January 2010, Bray was named the "cleanest town in Ireland" in the 2009 Irish Business Against Litter (IBAL) survey of 60 towns and cities.

=== Tourist sites ===
Tourist sites in the area include the Elizabethan-revival mansion Killruddery House (which is open to the public in the summer months), and the hill and headland at Bray Head (which has a number of walking trails). Raheen-a-Cluig, a medieval church which is catalogued as national monument, is located on the north face of Bray Head. Other religious sites and churches in the area include the Fassaroe Cross (12th century), the Holy Redeemer Church, Bray (1792), and the Gothic Revival churches of Christ Church (1863) and Bray Methodist Church (1864).

=== Festivals and events ===
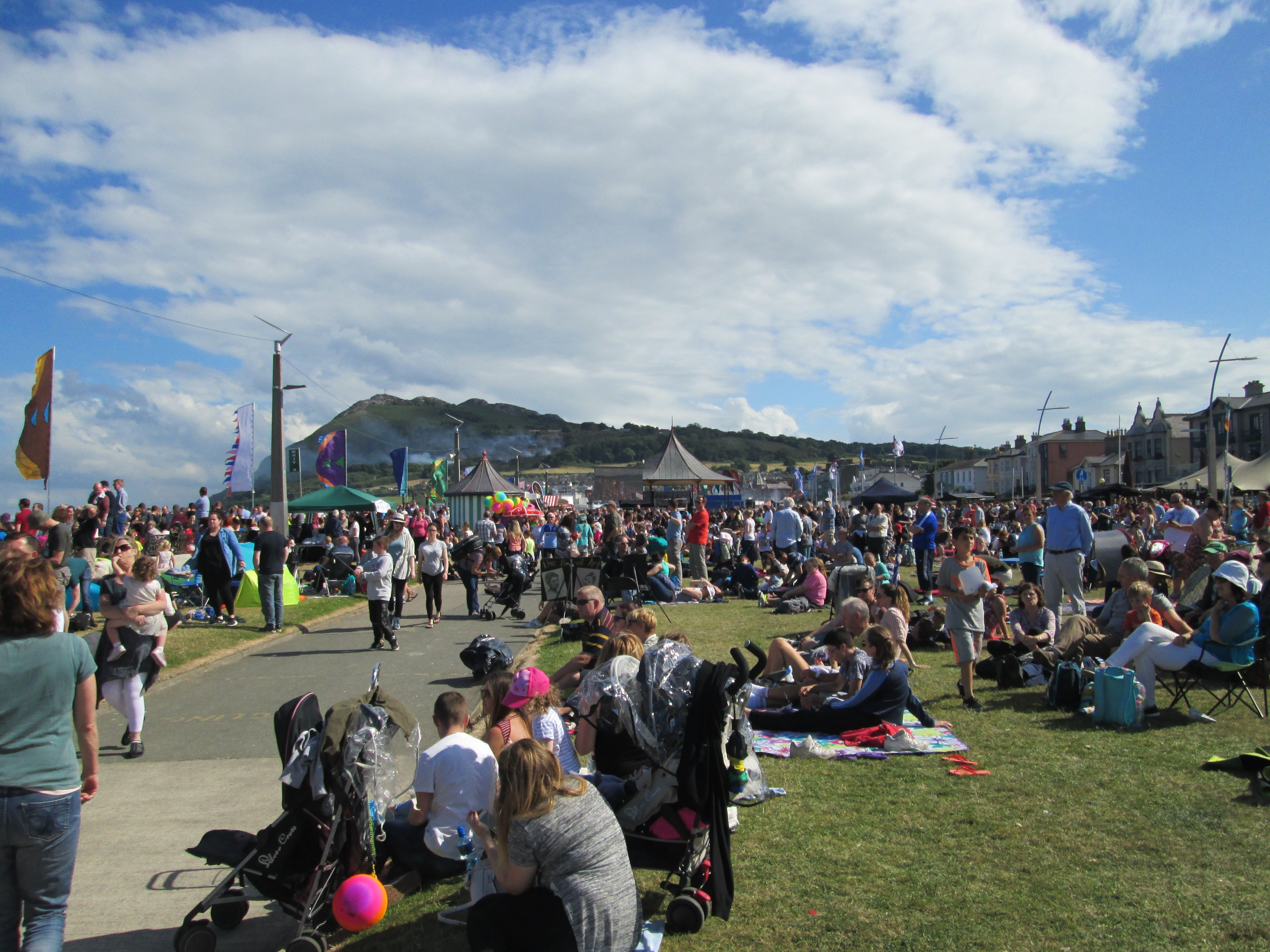
Bray Air Show 2016

The Bray St. Patrick's Carnival and Parade is presented by Bray and District Chamber to celebrate Saint Patrick's Day.

Bray also hosts a yearly silent film festival, the Killruddery Film Festival in Killruddery Gardens. Bray Jazz Festival takes place annually on the May bank holiday weekend and includes performances by jazz and world music artists.

The annual Bray Summerfest takes place over six weeks in July and August and includes free entertainment, live music, markets, sporting events, and carnivals. Performers who have headlined include Mundy, Brian Kennedy, the Undertones, the Hothouse Flowers and Mary Black.

The Bray Air Display is an annual air display that takes place over the beach, typically in late July or early August.

Hell & Back is an adventure race that takes place in Kilruddery Estates. The 10 km Cliff Run from Bray to Greystones is an annual run on the coast around Bray Head Mountain. In 2023, Bray was named by Time Out magazine as one of the fourteen most underrated travel destinations in the world.

=== Pubs and restaurants ===
Bray's pubs and restaurants include the first Porterhouse bar, who brew their own ales, stouts and beers. In 2010, the Lonely Planet Guide ranked the Harbour Bar in Bray the Best Bar in the World and the Best off the Beaten Track Bar in the world. The O'Toole family owned the bar for three generations, but it was bought by the Duggan family in 2013.

There are twelve fully licensed restaurants, several unlicensed restaurants and cafes, and fast food outlets in Bray. In 2015, The Irish Times published a study which analysed the presence of fast food outlets in Ireland. Bray was found to have the lowest per capita concentration of the ten towns and cities included, with just 0.09 stores per 1,000 people.

== Culture ==
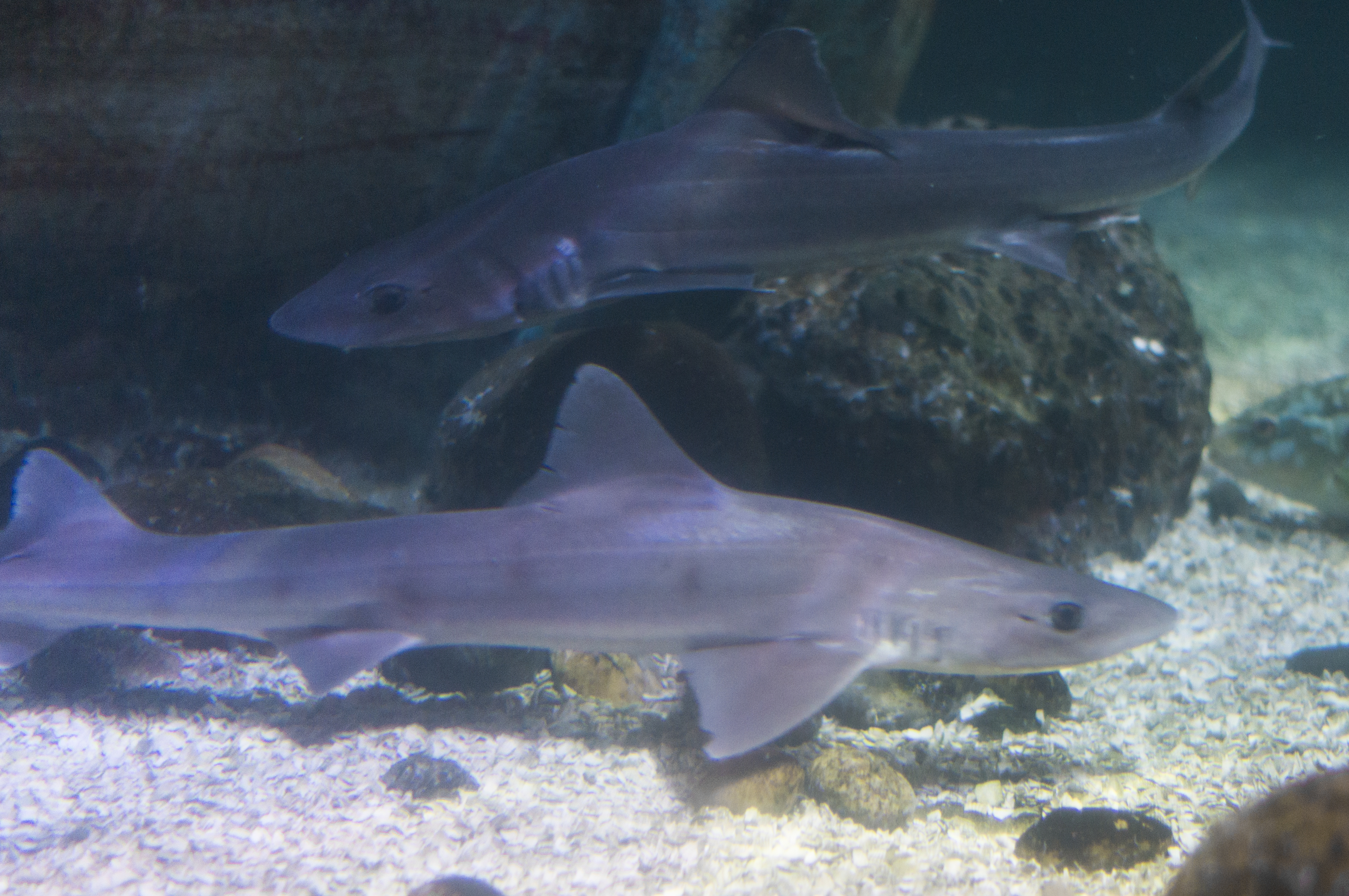
National Sealife Centre, Bray

=== Film ===
Bray is home to Ireland's oldest film studios, Ardmore Studios, established in 1958, where films such as Excalibur, Braveheart and Breakfast on Pluto have been shot. Custer's Last Stand-up was filmed in Bray and the town was also used to film Neil Jordan's 2012 film Byzantium, part of which was shot in the Bray Head Inn. Neil Jordan's 1991 film The Miracle is set in Bray.

=== Theatre and literature ===
Bray hosts a number of theatre groups including the Bray Arts and Square One Theatre Group.

Authors who have lived in Bray have included James Joyce, Sir Arthur Conan Doyle, Molly Keane and Neil Jordan. Situated on Eglinton Road is a Carnegie Library dating from 1910. There is also another library serving the Ballywaltrim district on Boghall Road, at the southern end of the town

=== Media ===
The Bray People newspaper is focused on the news in the local areas and neighbourhoods, as does the freesheet Wicklow Times (North Edition). East Coast FM Radio Station also operates locally.

=== Music ===
Musicians associated with Bray include Mary Coughlan, Maria Doyle Kennedy, Fionn Regan, Florence Road, and Hozier.

The singer Sinéad O'Connor was also a resident of Bray for a number of years, living in a house overlooking the sea on Strand Road. After O'Connor died in London, her funeral procession took place on Bray seafront in August 2023.

== Sports ==
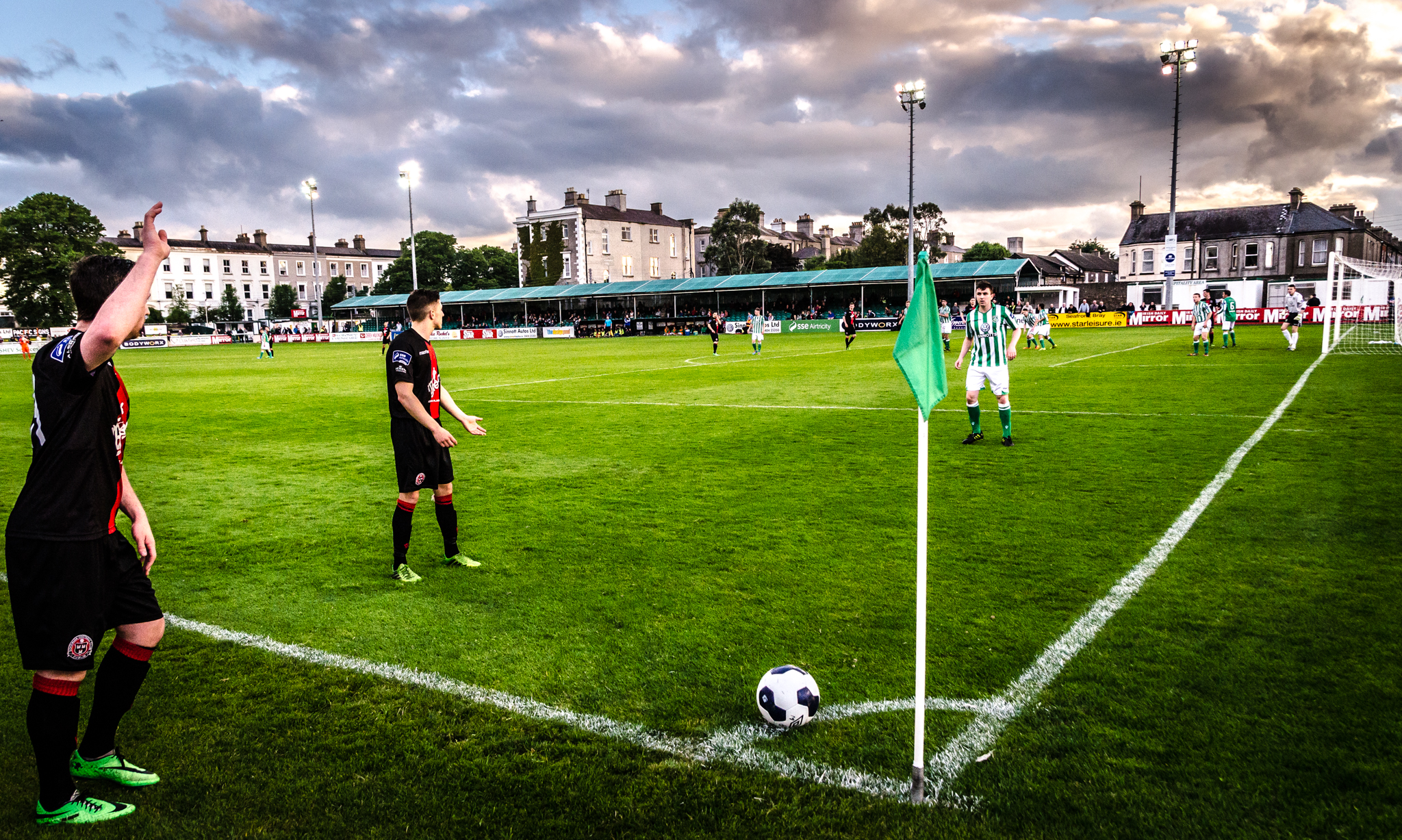
Bray Wanderers vs Bohemians at the Carlisle Grounds

Bray is home to League of Ireland football club Bray Wanderers who play at the Carlisle Grounds. It also hosts schoolboy/girl and senior football club Ardmore Rovers. The local Gaelic Athletic Association club is Bray Emmets. Bray Emmets, established in 1885, hosts the annual All-Ireland Kick Fada Championship.

There are a number of golf clubs and pitch & putt courses in the area, including Bray Golf Club, Dun Laoghaire Golf Club, and Old Conna Golf Club. Bray is also host to Bray Bowling Club, which trains in Fáilte Park, and there is 10 Pin Bowling at the Bray Bowling Alley.

There is fishing in both the River Dargle and on the sea coastline, and a number of clubs locally, including Bray Head Fishing Club and Dargle Anglers Club. Other clubs and facilities in the area include Bray Wheelers Cycling Club, Brennanstown Riding School, Bray Sailing Club, Wicklow Lawn Tennis Club, founded in 1894 and located on Vevay Road, Bray Hockey Club, and Wicklow County Cricket Club.

A short-lived greyhound racing track existed in the town from 1949 until 1955, run by the Bray Greyhound Racing Association Ltd. In December 1947, notice was given that a track would be constructed at Sunnybank but the Wicklow County Manager refused the application. However, the greyhound company continued to build the facilities and in 1949 the track opened. It was not until 1950 that the High Court ruled against the company for building without planning permission and levied a fine of £470. The dispute continued until, in 1955, the track was bought by Bray Urban Council under a compulsory purchase order. The site, consisting of almost five acres, was bought at £440 per acre, and 36 houses were built on the land.

Thousands of people turned out on the seafront to see Olympic boxing champion Katie Taylor, return home from London in August 2012.

== Education ==
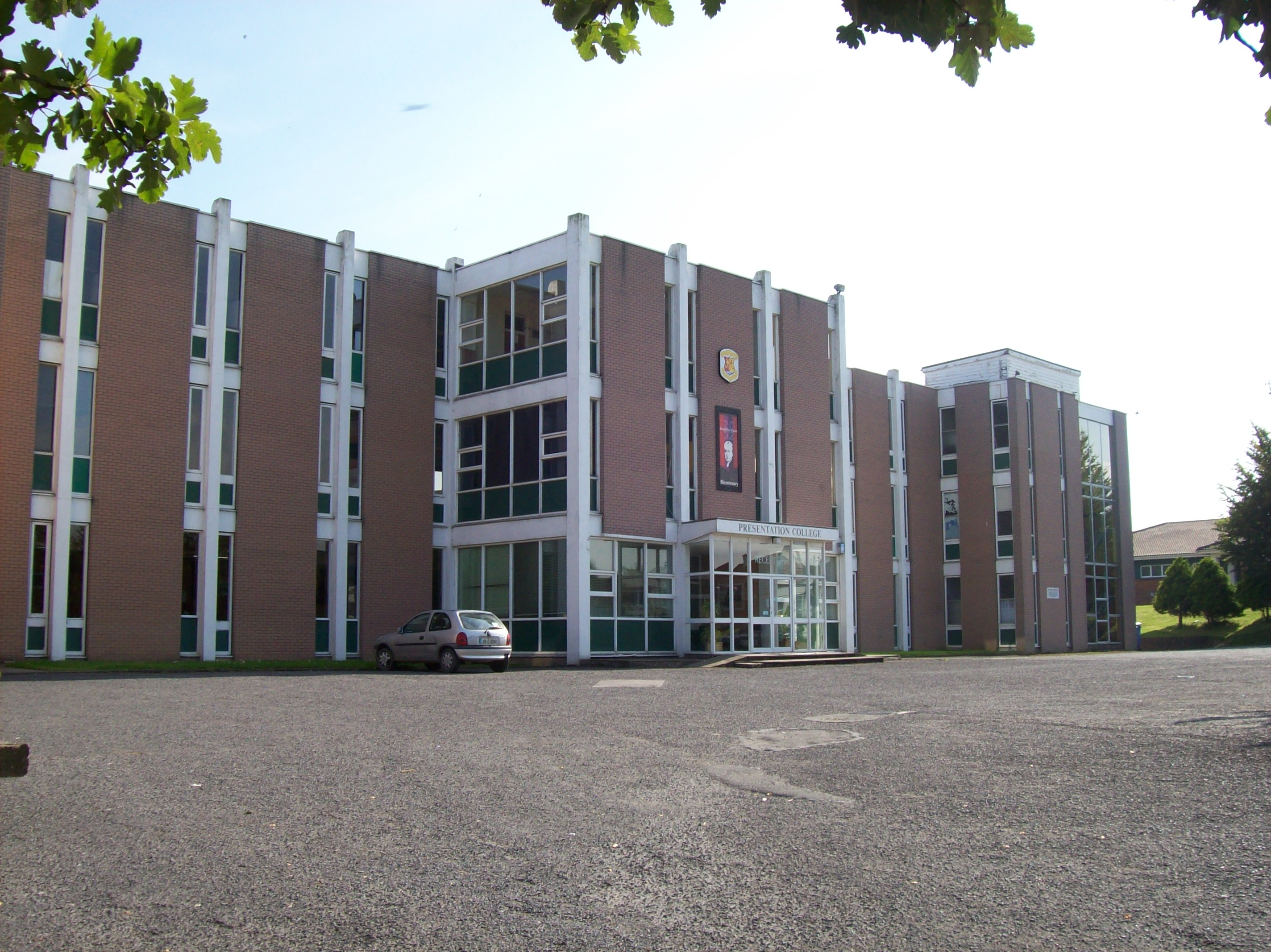
Presentation College, Bray

There are approximately 13 primary schools in the Bray area, including national schools (like Saint Cronan's Boys' National School), gaelscoileanna (like Gaelscoil Uí Chéadaigh), a co-educational day school (St. Gerard's School), and schools for additional needs. Secondary schools in the area include Saint Brendan's College, Loreto Secondary School and St. Kilian's Community School and Presentation College, Bray. A number of "English as a foreign language" and third-level schools also operate locally, including Bray Institute of Further Education.

== People ==
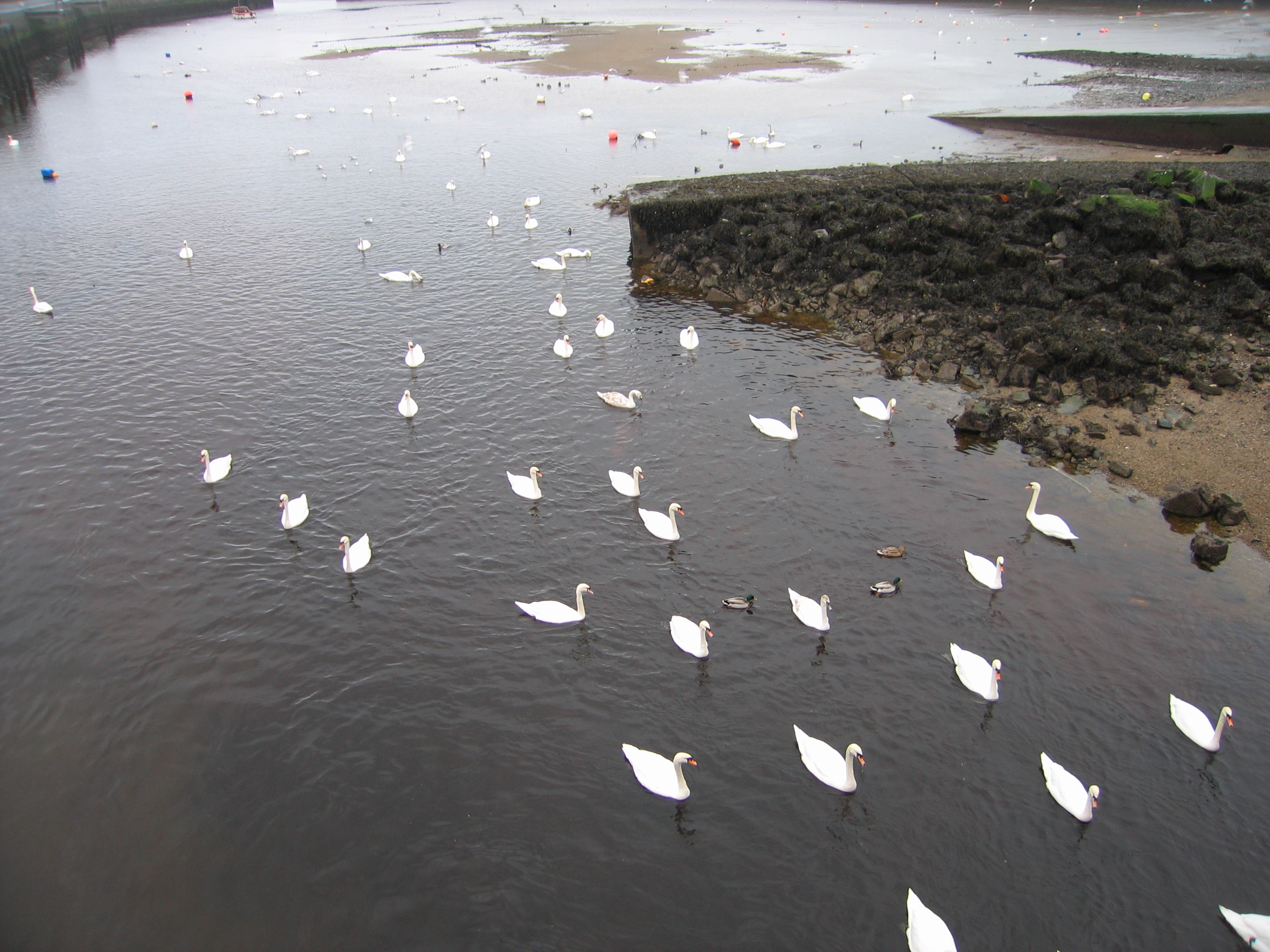
Swans where the River Dargle flows into the harbour

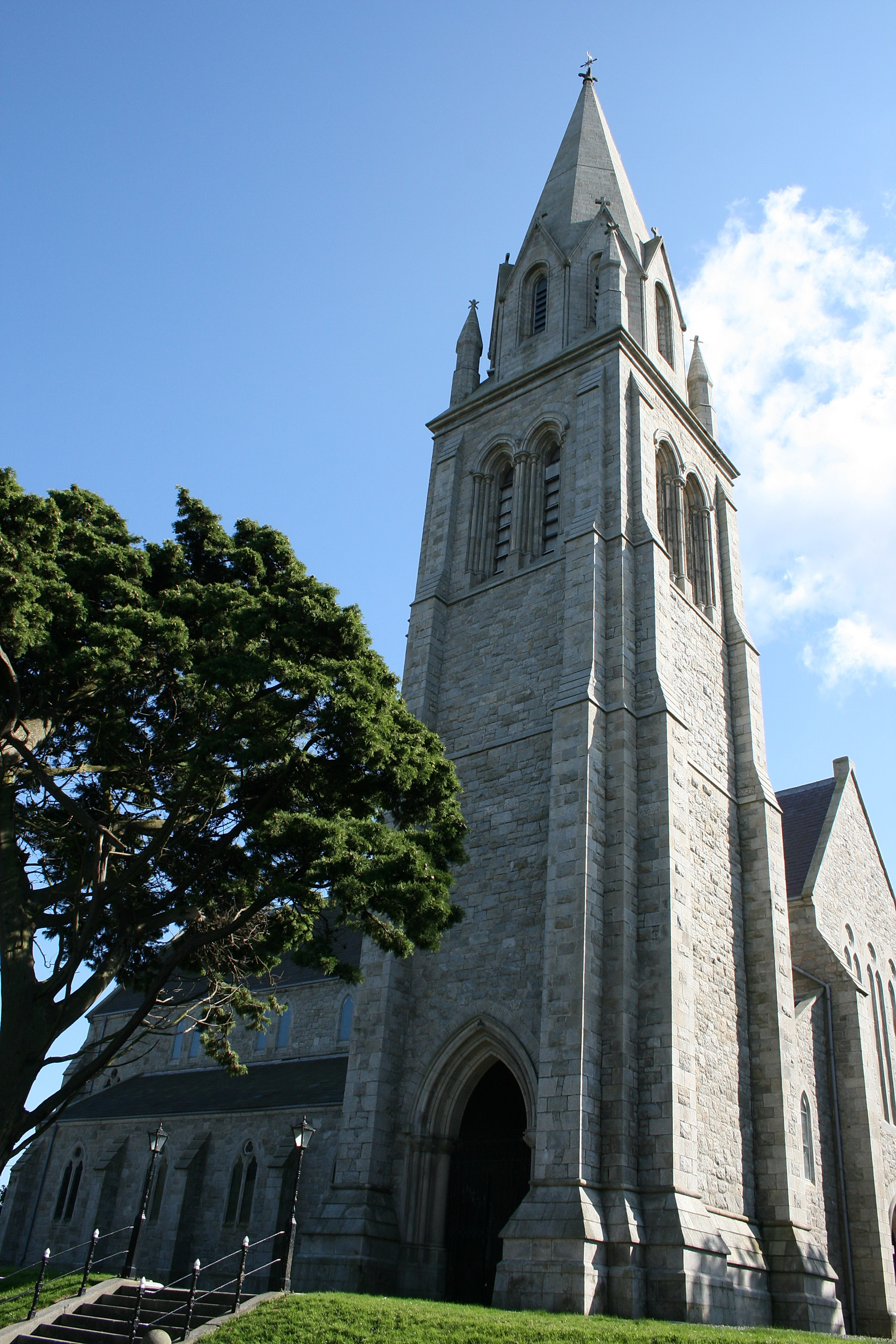
Christ Church, Bray

Former or current residents of the town have included (in alphabetical order):

- Eamon de Buitlear, writer, filmmaker and traditional Irish musician
- Conrad Burke, physicist and entrepreneur
- Seamus Costello, founding member of the Irish National Liberation Army
- Mary Coughlan, singer who resides in the town
- Phil Coulter, musician and songwriter
- Suzanne Crowe, President of the Medical Council of Ireland
- S.M. Cyril, India-based Irish nun, educationist, educational innovator and 2007 winner of the Padma Shri Award
- Fergal Devitt, professional wrestler in WWE, who wrestles under the name Finn Bálor
- Jordan Devlin, professional wrestler in WWE, who wrestles under the name JD McDonagh
- Paul Henry (1876–1958), post-impressionist painter known for his depictions of Connemara, lived at 1 Sidmonton Square
- Hozier (born 1990), singer and songwriter
- Eddie Jordan (1948–2025), former racing driver and Jordan Grand Prix founder
- Ed Joyce, professional cricketer
- James Joyce, writer
- Maria Doyle Kennedy, singer and actress who resided in the town as a child.
- Denzil Lacey, former RTÉ 2fm and current Spin South West presenter
- Sheridan Le Fanu, writer of gothic horror and mystery novels
- Thomas Langlois Lefroy, politician and judge, who lived in his family estate in Newcourt
- Keith Nolan, professional golfer, former GB & Ireland Walker Cup player, and PGA Tour player
- Dara Ó Briain, comedian and television host
- Sinéad O'Connor, singer who resided in the town
- Cearbhall Ó Dálaigh, fifth President of Ireland
- Fran O'Toole, former lead singer in The Miami Showband, murdered in the Miami Showband massacre of July 1975.
- Gary O'Toole, former Irish Olympic swimmer from Bray
- Darren Randolph, goalkeeper for the Republic of Ireland national football team
- Fionn Regan, musician
- Lennox Robinson, dramatist and poet
- Katie Taylor, world, European, and Olympic boxing gold medalist
- Laura Whitmore, TV personality and presenter
- William Wilde and Jane Wilde, the parents of Oscar Wilde, built properties on Esplanade Terrace in 1863, one of which is now the Strand Hotel

== Twin towns ==
Bray has town twinning agreements with:

- Bègles, France
- Dublin, California, United States
- Würzburg, Germany
