= Bray Town Hall =

Municipal building in Bray, County Wicklow, Ireland

- Halla Baile Bhré
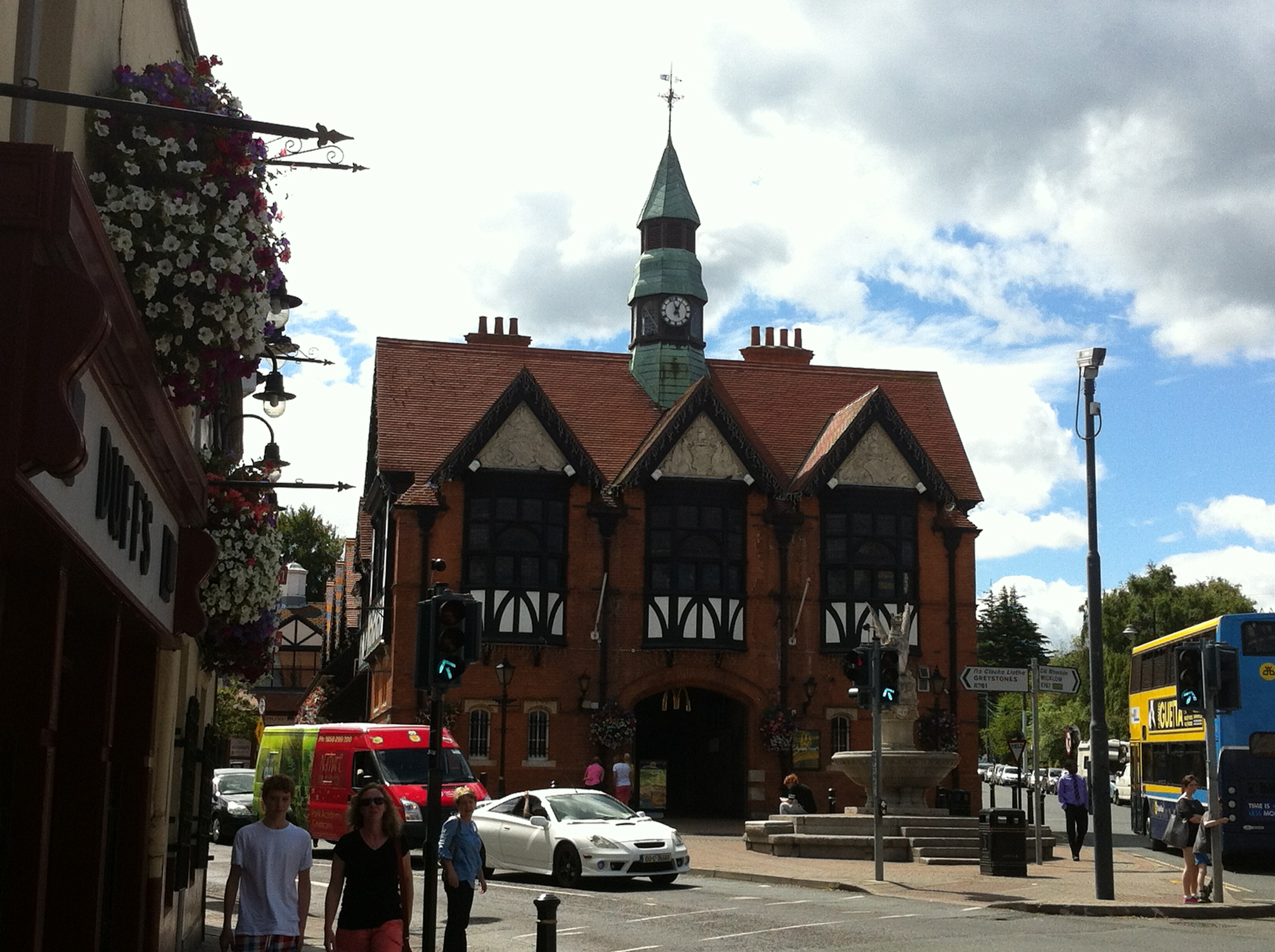
- Bray Town Hall

- Location within Ireland

General information
- Architectural style: Tudor Revival style
- Location: Main Street, Bray, Ireland
- Coordinates: 53.2006°N 6.1112°W
- Completed: 1884

Design and construction
- Architects: Thomas Newenham Deane and Guy Dawber

Bray Town Hall (Irish: Halla Baile Bhré) is a municipal building in Main Street, Bray, County Wicklow, Ireland. The building which used to be the offices and meeting place of Bray Urban District Council now accommodates a McDonald's fast-food restaurant.

== History ==
The first municipal building in the town was a market house in the north part of Bray. In the late 1870s, Lord Brabazon, and his wife, Mary, Lady Brabazon, who lived near-by at Killruddery House, decided to commission a more substantial building for the town. The site they selected was at the corner of Killarney Road and Vevay Road. A fountain, with a sculpture of a rampant wyvern holding a shield depicting the coat of arms of the Brabazon family, was unveiled at the front of the site in 1881. The new building was designed by Thomas Newenham Deane and Guy Dawber in the Tudor Revival style, built by Wardrop & Son in red brick with mock timber framing at a cost of £6,359 and was completed in time for a meeting of the town commissioners on 19 May 1884.

The design involved a symmetrical main frontage of three bays facing onto Main Street. On the ground floor, the central bay featured a segmental shaped opening with iron gates, while the outer bays contained pairs of lancet windows with iron grills. The first floor was fenestrated by three prominent half-timbered oriel windows, surmounted by gables containing heraldic carvings in bas-relief. At roof level, there was a two-stage octagonal fleche with clock faces in the first stage and louvres in the second stage. The long side elevations were arcaded and open on the ground floor, so that markets could be held, with a series of half-timbered gables containing casement windows installed on the first floor. Internally, the principal room was the council chamber on the first floor: it featured an elaborate timber roof, two finely carved chimney pieces and a series of colourful stained glass windows.

In 1899, the town commissioners were replaced by an urban district council, with the town hall becoming the offices of the new council. The Irish Catholic fraternal organisation, the Ancient Order of Hibernians, used the town hall from 1911 and the local branch of the paramilitary group, the Irish Citizen Army, formed in 1913, also met there. The ground floor of the building continued to be used for weekly markets until the 1940s. The Bray Heritage Centre, established in the town hall in 1985, was based there until the centre relocated to the old courthouse in 1993.

An extensive programme of refurbishment works was undertaken by Noonan Construction in the early-1990s. Following the refurbishment, Bray Urban District Council continued to occupy the council chamber on the first floor, while McDonald's operated a fast-food restaurant on the ground floor from 1997. The first floor continued to be occupied by the council until 2002, when its successor body, Bray Town Council, was formed at the newly-opened Civic Offices in Main Street. In 2014, the council was dissolved and administration of the town was amalgamated with Wicklow County Council in accordance with the Local Government Reform Act 2014.
