= The Fortune of Christina McNab =

1921 film

- Directed by: W. P. Kellino
- Written by: Sarah Broom Macnaughtan (novel); Paul Rooff
- Starring: Nora Swinburne; David Hawthorne; Francis Lister; Sara Sample
- Production company: Gaumont British Picture Corporation
- Distributed by: Gaumont British Distributors
- Release date: April 1921
- Running time: 6,200 feet
- Country: United Kingdom
- Languages: Silent; English intertitles

The Fortune of Christina McNab is a 1921 British silent comedy film directed by W. P. Kellino and starring Nora Swinburne, David Hawthorne and Francis Lister. It was made at Lime Grove Studios, based on a 1901 novel by Sarah Broom Macnaughtan. It was one in a series of get-rich-quick comedies made by Kellino, of which this is amongst the best known.

== Cast ==
- Nora Swinburne as Christina McNab
- David Hawthorne as Colin McCrae
- Francis Lister as Duke of Southwark
- Sara Sample as Muriel Stonor
- Marjorie Chard as Lady Anne Drummond
- Chick Farr as Archie Anstruthers
- Norman Tharp as Mr. Drummond
- Gena Ray as Joan Drummond
- Eva Westlake as Lady Tarbutt
- Dora Levis as Jessie

== Bibliography ==
- Low, Rachael. History of the British Film, 1918–1929. George Allen & Unwin, 1971.
