= Angel Esquire =

Angel Esquire may refer to:

- Angel Esquire (novel), a 1908 novel by Edgar Wallace
- Angel Esquire (film), a 1919 British silent film, based on the novel
