= David Hawthorne (actor) =

British stage and film actor (1888–1942)

- as Rob Roy (1922)
- Born: Charles Frederick Hawthorne; 22 May 1888; Kettering; United Kingdom
- Died: 18 June 1942 (aged 54); London; United Kingdom
- Occupations: Film actor Stage actor
- Years active: 1920 - 1937

David Hawthorne (22 May 1888 – 18 June 1942) was a British stage and film actor. He played the leading man in a number of films during the silent era, but later switched to character roles. One of his more notable roles was that of Rob Roy MacGregor in the 1922 film Rob Roy.

His stage work included the original West End productions of Noël Coward's Sirocco in 1927, Somerset Maugham's For Services Rendered in 1932 and J.B. Priestley's Laburnum Grove in 1933, for which he reprised his performance as Inspector Stack in the 1936 film version. A 1937 extract from Busman's Honeymmoon at the Comedy Theatre survives, showing him as a detective interviewing a witness, as filmed for Pathé News.

== Selected filmography ==
- Testimony (1920)
- The Autumn of Pride (1921)
- The Fortune of Christina McNab (1921)
- Class and No Class (1921)
- Open Country (1922)
- Rob Roy (1922)
- A Soul's Awakening (1922)
- A Prince of Lovers (1922)
- Silent Evidence (1922)
- The Great Prince Shan (1924)
- The Conspirators (1924)
- The Presumption of Stanley Hay, MP (1925)
- The Mating of Marcus (1926)
- His House in Order (1928)
- Birds of Prey (1930)
- Creeping Shadows (1931)
- Glamour (1931)
- The Woman Between (1931)
- The Other Woman (1931)
- Mr. Bill the Conqueror (1932)
- The Lad (1935)
- Laburnum Grove (1936)

== Bibliography ==
- Low, Rachael. History of the British Film, 1918-1929. George Allen & Unwin, 1971.
- Richards, Jeffrey. Films and British National Identity: From Dickens to Dad's Army. Manchester University Press, 1997.
