= A Soul's Awakening =

1922 film

- Directed by: W. P. Kellino
- Written by: Frank Powell
- Starring: David Hawthorne; Flora le Breton; Ethel Oliver; Maurice Thompson
- Production company: Gaumont British Picture Corporation
- Distributed by: Gaumont British Distributors
- Release date: July 1922
- Running time: 6,000 feet
- Country: United Kingdom
- Languages: Silent; English intertitles

A Soul's Awakening is a 1922 British silent drama film directed by W. P. Kellino and starring David Hawthorne, Flora le Breton and Ethel Oliver. It was made at Lime Grove Studios in Shepherd's Bush. It is also known by the alternative title What Love Can Do.

== Cast ==
- David Hawthorne as Ben Rackstraw
- Flora le Breton as Maggie Rackstraw
- Ethel Oliver as Sal Lee
- Maurice Thompson as Jim Rackstraw
- Sylvia Caine as Cynthia Dare
- Philip Desborough as Cecil Wayne
- Tom Morris as Mike Nolan

== Bibliography ==
- Low, Rachael. History of the British Film, 1918–1929. George Allen & Unwin, 1971.
