= Branded (1920 film) =

1920 British film by E. H. Calvert

- Directed by: E. H. Calvert
- Written by: Gerald Biss (novel); Paul Rooff
- Starring: Josephine Earle; Dallas Anderson; Nora Swinburne
- Cinematography: Basil Emmott
- Production company: British Screencraft
- Distributed by: Gaumont British
- Release date: September 1920
- Country: United Kingdom
- Languages: Silent; English intertitles

Branded is a 1920 British silent drama film directed by E. H. Calvert and starring Josephine Earle, Dallas Anderson and Nora Swinburne.

== Cast ==
- Josephine Earle as Phyllis / Helen Jerningham
- Dallas Anderson as Caton Brember
- Nora Swinburne as Doris Jerningham
- Francis Lister as Ralph Shopwyke
- Maud Yates as Lady Margaret Maitland
- Terence Cavanagh as Sir Lionel Erskine
- Morton Selten as Marquis of Shelford
- Emilie Nichol as Mrs. Chichele

== Bibliography ==
- Low, Rachael. The History of the British Film 1918-1929. George Allen & Unwin, 1971.
