= Class and No Class =

1921 British film by W. P. Kellino

- Directed by: W. P. Kellino
- Written by: E. Newton-Bungey (novel)
- Starring: Judd Green; Pauline Johnson; David Hawthorne; Marie Ault
- Cinematography: A. St. Aubyn Brown
- Production company: Gaumont British Picture Corporation
- Distributed by: Gaumont British Distributors
- Release date: December 1921
- Country: United Kingdom
- Languages: Silent; English intertitles

Class and No Class is a 1921 British silent comedy film directed by W. P. Kellino and starring Judd Green, Pauline Johnson and David Hawthorne. It was based on a novel by E. Newton-Bungey.

== Cast ==
- Judd Green as Jeremy Russell
- Pauline Johnson as Nancy
- David Hawthorne as Dick Foster
- Marie Ault as Liza Ann
- Tom Coventry as Sam West
- Cecil del Gue as Colonel Sir John Gatfield JP
- Cyril Smith as Lord Daventry
