= A Personal Affair =

1912 film by C.J. Williams

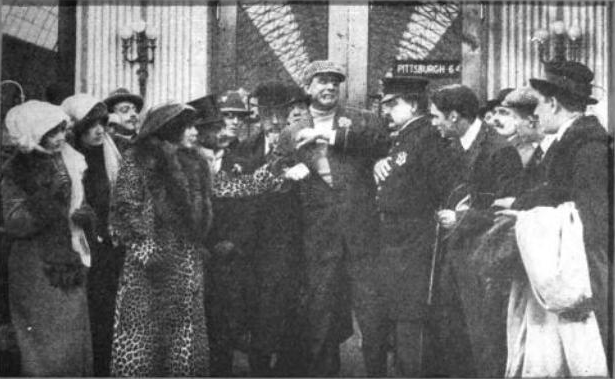
- Directed by: C.J. Williams
- Starring: Mary Fuller; Gertrude McCoy; Elsie MacLeod; Edward Boulden; Charles Ogle
- Distributed by: Edison
- Release date: May 15, 1912
- Running time: 1000 ft. (approx.)
- Country: United States
- Languages: Silent; English intertitles

A Personal Affair is a short American silent comedy produced by the Edison Company in 1912.

== Release ==
The film was released in the United States on May 15, 1912.
