= The Shadow Between =

The Shadow Between may refer to:

- The Shadow Between (1920 film), a British silent crime film
- The Shadow Between (1931 film), a British romantic drama film
