= The Green Rust =

1919 novel by Edgar Wallace

- Author: Edgar Wallace
- Language: English
- Genre: Crime
- Publication date: 1919
- Publication place: United Kingdom
- Media type: Print

The Green Rust is a 1919 crime novel by the British writer Edgar Wallace. An American detective battles an evil Doctor who plans to destroy the world's wheat supplies.

Link to full public domain text here

== Film adaptation ==
The same year it was made into a silent film The Green Terror directed by William Kellino and starring Heather Thatcher.

== Bibliography ==
- Goble, Alan. The Complete Index to Literary Sources in Film. Walter de Gruyter, 1999.
