= Flora Le Breton =

English silent film actress (1899–1951)

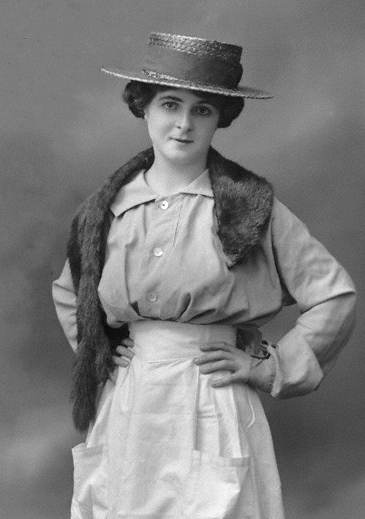
- Le Breton in 1917
- Born: 1899; Croydon, Surrey, England
- Died: 11 July 1951 (aged 51–52); Brooklyn, New York, U.S.
- Education: Royal Academy of Dramatic Art
- Occupation: Silent film actress

Flora Le Breton (1899 – 11 July 1951 in Brooklyn, New York City) was an English silent film actress from Croydon, Surrey, England. She was a dainty blonde with dark blue eyes. In the UK she was called both "the British Mary Pickford" and "the English Mary Pickford".

== Lineage and family ==
Her ancestry was English, French, Scottish and Irish. Her Scottish lineage was lengthy and distinguished. She was related to Archibald Campbell, 2nd Earl of Argyll. Her ancestral home, Ware Park, dated to the 15th century. Flora Annie Le Breton was the youngest child of a gentleman of private means, Bertram Le Breton (born 1870), and his wife, and Florence Evelyn Le Breton. She had a sister named Violet (born 1897), and their brother was named Vivian Bertram Le Breton (born 1898). In August 1918, her brother, Lieutenant Vivian Le Breton, who had just weeks before married Miss Theodora Fairbrother, was killed in action while fighting in France during World War I. Her sister Violet married Major Cecil Haigh and settled in Hong Kong.

== Education and stage career ==
She trained for the stage at the Royal Academy of Dramatic Art in London. Le Breton earned a scholarship there at the age of 15 Founded by Sir Herbert Tree, the academy grant was presented to her by Sir Squire Bancroft and Sir John Hare.

She secured the role of a London flower girl and played opposite Sir Gerald du Maurier for an entire year in the English capital. She was noticed by Andre Charlot, who envisioned her as an English soubrette. He put Le Breton in several revues in which she sang and performed a stiff-legged doll dance that became the highlight of the shows.

== Film actress ==
Le Breton's film career began in 1920 with a role as Alesia in La Poupee. In 1922, she co-starred with George K. Arthur and Simeon Stuart in Love's Influence, originally titled Love's April. The French heavyweight boxer Georges Carpentier made a cameo in the British silent film. Le Breton won many of the London film favourite contests along with actress Betty Balfour. She appeared in the first colour film made in Great Britain. The Glorious Adventure (1922) starred Lady Diana Cooper and Victor McLaglen. Produced by J. Stuart Blackton, founder of Vitagraph Studios, the film was made in Prizma colour.

As a dancer Le Breton and her partner Cecil Rubens won the world's amateur dancing championship in February 1923.

Le Breton arrived in the United States in January 1924. Among her early Hollywood films is Another Scandal (1924). She had the third lead after Lois Wilson and Holmes Herbert. Shot in Florida, the film was a production of the Tilford Cinema Corporation. Le Breton was among those considered for the role of Peter Pan in Peter Pan, which was adapted from the novel by James Barrie. She appeared in the melodrama I Am the Man (1924) with Lionel Barrymore. Her last screen credit came in the Columbia Pictures comedy Charley's Aunt (1930). Le Breton played the part of Ela Delahay.

Le Breton sent for her mother in Britain and settled her in Beverly Hills, California after she became a star in the U.S.

== American stage ==
In her first year in the United States, Le Breton acted in the play was Lass o' Laughter. Her character necessitates that she enunciate a Glaswegian Scottish accent. A reviewer praised her appearance, writing "Miss Le Breton's beauty is of the Dresden doll type". In November 1925, she was featured in the Henry W. Savage production The Balcony Walker, which played the Lyric Theatre in Bridgeport, Connecticut. By March 1926, she had given up her film career to appear in the New York City revue The Optimists. In 1928, she played Lady Delphine, the romantic object of song and dance man Charles King, in the well-received Broadway show Present Arms, which had a run of 155 performances at the Mansfield Theatre. In March 1929, Walter Winchell, in his gossip column "Diary of a New Yorker," recounted Miss Le Breton's theatrical struggle to win stardom and noted that she was now "the headliner and sensation of the bill at a vaudeville theater."

In 1933, Le Breton was reviewed favourably for her role in the School for Husbands, produced by the Theatre Guild. Included in the cast were Osgood Perkins and June Walker.

== Selected Broadway performances ==
- Lass o' Laughter (Comedy Theatre, New York, 28 performances, January – February 1928)
- The Optimists (Casino de Paris, New York, 24 performances, January – February 1928)
- Present Arms (Lew Fields' Mansfield Theatre, New York, 155 performances, 26 April to 1 September 1928)
- The Singing Rabbi (Selwyn Theatre, New York, 3 performances, 10–12 September 1931)
- The Cat and the Fiddle (Globe Theatre, N.Y., and then moved to George M. Cohan's Theatre, New York, 395 performances, 15 October 1931 to 24 September 1932)
- The School for Husbands (Empire Theatre, New York, 116 performances, 16 October 1932 to 20 January 1934)
- The Chinese Nightingale (Theatre of Young America, New York, 8 performances, October 1934)

== Selected filmography ==
- Cocaine (UK, 1922)
- A Soul's Awakening (UK, 1922)
- A Gipsy Cavalier (UK, 1922)
- Love's Influence (UK, 1922)
- I Will Repay (UK, 1923)
- Little Miss Nobody (UK, 1923)
- Another Scandal (U.S., 1924)
- Those Who Judge (U.S., 1924)
- I Am the Man (U.S., 1924)
- Lover's Island (U.S., 1924)
- The White Monkey (1925)
- Lover's Island (1925)
- Tons of Money (UK, 1926)
- Education of a Prince (France, 1927)
- The Rolling Road (UK, 1928)
- Charley's Aunt (U.S., 1930)
