= Laburnum Grove =

- Directed by: Carol Reed
- Written by: J. B. Priestley (play); Anthony Kimmins; Gordon Wellesley
- Produced by: Basil Dean
- Starring: Edmund Gwenn; Cedric Hardwicke; Victoria Hopper; Ethel Coleridge
- Cinematography: John W. Boyle
- Edited by: Jack Kitchin
- Music by: Ernest Irving
- Production company: Associated Talking Pictures
- Distributed by: Associated British (UK)
- Release date: 16 November 1936 (UK)
- Running time: 73 minutes
- Country: United Kingdom
- Language: English

Laburnum Grove is a 1936 British comedy film directed by Carol Reed and starring Edmund Gwenn, Cedric Hardwicke and Victoria Hopper. It was based on the 1933 play of the same name written by J. B. Priestley. Gwenn, Ethel Coleridge, Francis James, James Harcourt and David Hawthorne all repeated their roles from the play's original 1933-34 West End production, which had been directed by Hardwicke.

== Plot summary ==
To rid himself of his sponging relatives a man tells them he is really a forger which causes them to leave. His wife believes he is joking, but he has in fact allowed the truth to slip out and now he is in danger of being arrested.

== Cast ==
- Edmund Gwenn as Mr. Radfern
- Cedric Hardwicke as Mr. Baxley
- Victoria Hopper as Elsie Radfern
- Ethel Coleridge as Mrs. Baxley
- Katie Johnson as Mrs. Radfern
- Francis James as Harold Russ
- James Harcourt as Joe Fletten
- David Hawthorne as Inspector Stack
- Frederick Burtwell as Simpson

== Novelisation ==
In 1936, Heinemann, London issued, in hardcover, J. B. Priestley's Laburnum Grove "based on the famous stage play & film" by Ruth Holland. This book marked the second 'collaboration' between Holland and Priestley, as she had three years before novelised his play Dangerous Corner. Ms. Holland was at the time known for at least one work of popular contemporary fiction of her own, The Lost Generation, a wartime novel. She was also, by way of Priestley's second marriage, his sister-in-law.

== Reception ==
Writing for The Spectator in 1936, Graham Greene gave the film a good review, noting that "here at last is an English film one can unreservedly praise". Greene characterized the film as "thoroughly workmanlike and unpretentious", and praised director Reed for his difficult and successful adaptation of Priestley's original play.

== Bibliography ==
- Evans, Peter William. Carol Reed. Manchester University Press, 2005.
