= Angel Esquire (film) =

1919 British silent film by W. P. Kellino

- Directed by: W. P. Kellino
- Written by: Edgar Wallace (novel); George Pearson
- Starring: Aurelio Sidney; Gertrude McCoy; Dick Webb; Cecil del Gue
- Cinematography: A. St. Aubyn Brown
- Production company: Gaumont British Picture Corporation
- Distributed by: Gaumont British Distributors
- Release date: November 1919
- Running time: 5 reels
- Country: United Kingdom
- Languages: Silent; English intertitles

Angel Esquire is a 1919 British silent crime film directed by W. P. Kellino and starring Aurelio Sidney, Gertrude McCoy and Dick Webb. It is based on the 1908 novel Angel Esquire by Edgar Wallace, which was later turned into a 1964 German film The Curse of the Hidden Vault.

== Premise ==
A millionaire leaves his fortune to whoever can discover the combination to unlock his safe.

== Cast ==
- Aurelio Sidney as Jimmy
- Gertrude McCoy as Kathleen Kent
- Dick Webb as Angel
- W.T. Ellwanger as Spedding
- George Traill as Connor
- Cecil del Gue as Reale
- Florence Nelson as Mrs. Reale

== Bibliography ==
- Low, Rachael. History of the British Film, 1918–1929. George Allen & Unwin, 1971.
