= Wallace Bosco =

British actor (1880–1973)

Wallace Charles Bosco (31 January 1880 in St Pancras, London – 17 April 1973 in Richmond upon Thames, Surrey) was an English film actor and screenwriter.

== Filmography ==
Year	Title	Role	Notes
1913	Ivanhoe	Sir Cedric, Ivanhoe's Father	
1914	The Incomparable Bellairs	Lord Mandeville	
1916	The Two Roads	Taplow	
1919	Where Ambition Leads	Time	
1919	I Will	Sherlock Blake	
1919	The Flag Lieutenant	Villain	
1920	Calvary	Reuben Leaffel	
1920	A Dead Certainty		
1920	Judge Not		
1920	The Shadow Between	Dick West	
1920	Won by a Head	Jim Kort	
1920	Saved from the Sea	Peter Scalcher	
1920	Lady Audley's Secret	Luke Marks	
1920	The Town of Crooked Ways	Mallowes	
1921	Handy Andy	Murphy	
1921	Dollars in Surrey		
1921	How Kitchener Was Betrayed		
1922	The House of Peril	Polperro	
1922	Potter's Clay	Louis	
1922	The Wheels of Chance	Dayle	
1922	Rob Roy	James Grahame	
1922	The Green Caravan	Sir Simeon Marks	
1922	Tense Moments from Opera	King Charles	(segment "Maritana")
1923	The School for Scandal	Snake	
1923	Darkness		Short
1923	The Fair Maid of Perth		
1923	Old Bill Through the Ages		
1924	Old Bill Through the Ages		Short
1924	The Kensington Mystery		Short
1927	Quinneys	Tomlin	
1928	Sailors Don't Care	Fink	
1928	Balaclava	Lord Palmerston	
1928	The Valley of Ghosts	Derricus Merrivan	
1928	The Man Who Changed His Name	Jerry Muller	
1928	Mademoiselle Parley Voo		
1929	The Adventures of Dick Turpin	Uncle	
1930	The Dizzy Limit	Woolf	
1930	The School for Scandal	Rawley	
1931	Dangerous Seas	Sunny Bantick	
1931	The Wickham Mystery	Edward Hamilton	
1934	Boots! Boots!	Mr. Clifford	
1935	Royal Cavalcade	M.P.	
1937	Dark Journey	Swedish Customs Officer	Uncredited
1938	The Lady Vanishes	Gasthof Petrus Guest	Uncredited
1939	Q Planes	Minor Role	Uncredited
1941	The Ghost Train	Ted Holmes	Uncredited
1944	Time Flies		Uncredited
1944	A Canterbury Tale	Man A.R.P. Worker	
1944	Two Thousand Women	Dubois - Maningford's Butler	Uncredited
1945	Brief Encounter	Doctor at Bobbie's Accident	Uncredited
1948	The Blind Goddess	Newspaper Seller	Uncredited
1948	The Winslow Boy	man in Commons smoking room	Uncredited
1949	The Small Back Room	Passerby	Uncredited
1955	Richard III	Monk	
1961	Carry on Regardless	Old Man in Ruby Room	Uncredited
1965	Repulsion	Old Man	Uncredited, (final film role)
