= Women and Diamonds =

1924 film

Women and Diamonds is a 1924 British silent crime film directed by F. Martin Thornton and starring Victor McLaglen, Madge Stuart and Florence Turner.

== Cast ==
- Victor McLaglen as Brian Owen
- Madge Stuart as Olive Seaton
- Florence Turner as Mrs. Seaton
- Norman Whalley as Ray Seaton
- M.A. Wetherell as Barry Seaton
- Walter Tennyson as Jimmy Foster
- Simeon Stuart as Munro Clay
- Clifton Boyne as Sweeney
- Cecil del Gue as Jim Beverley
