= Gertrude McCoy =

American actress (1890–1967)

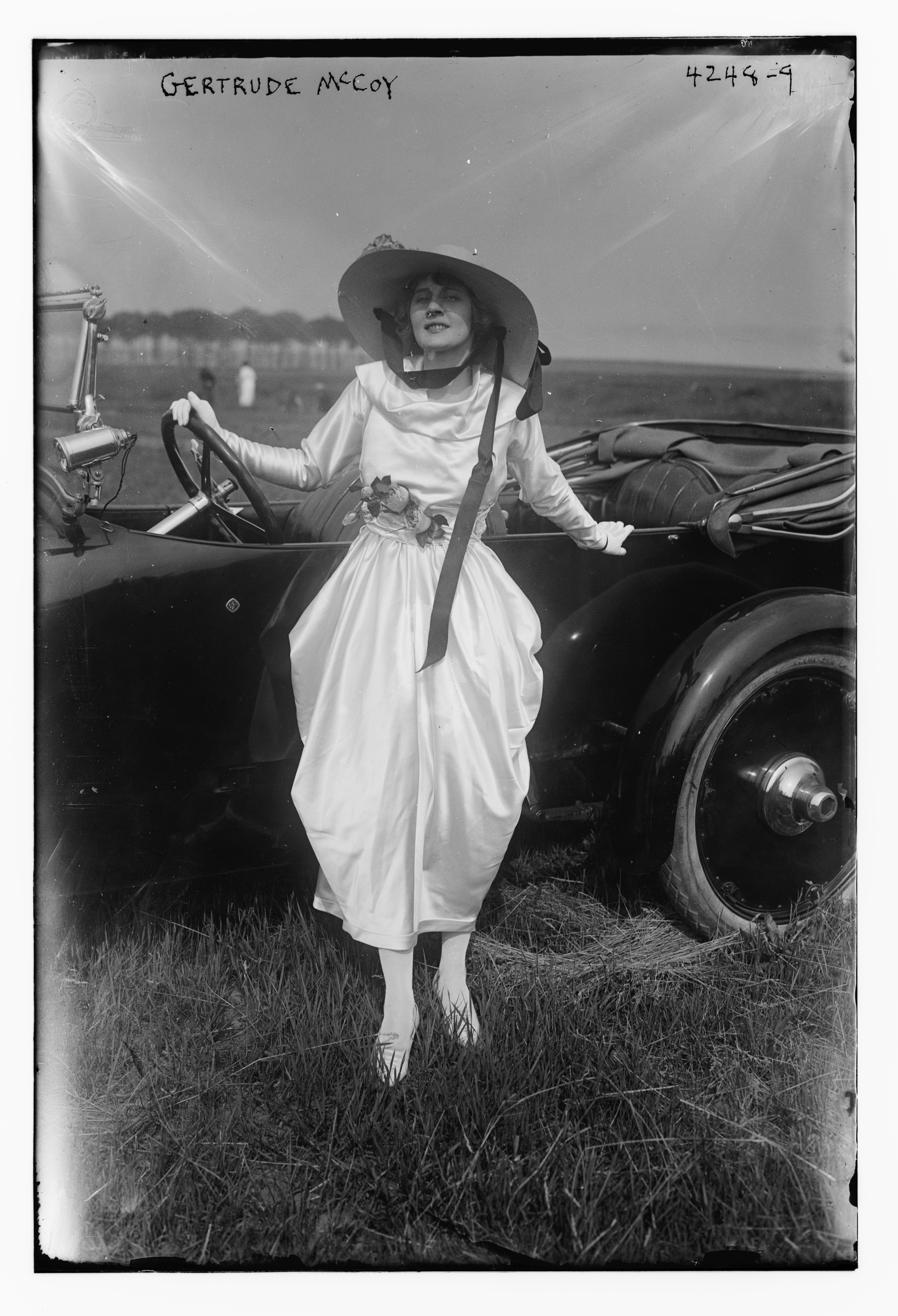
- McCoy in 1917
- Born: Gertrude Lyon; June 30, 1890; Sugar Valley, Georgia, U.S.
- Died: July 17, 1967 (aged 77); Atlanta, Georgia, U.S.
- Years active: 1911–1926
- Spouse: Duncan McRae (m. 1919; died 1931)

Gertrude McCoy (born Gertrude Lyon; June 30, 1890 – July 17, 1967) was an American film actress of the silent era. She appeared in more than 160 films between 1911 and 1926.

McCoy was born in Rome, Georgia, on June 30, 1896, and she attended schools in Nassau, Tennessee.

McCoy was a Gibson Girl, modeling for artist Charles Dana Gibson, before she acted. She began working for Gaumont studios in 1916 and also acted for Zitaphone, Biograph, and Pathe.

In 1915, the Gertrude McCoy Theater opened in West Baltimore's Easterwood section. It was built by the Lord Calvert Amusement Company. When McCoy retired in 1927, the 500-seat theater's name was changed to the Fulton Theater.

McCoy married British actor Duncan McRae in 1919. Together, they made films in England, Germany, and South America.

In the 1930s, McCoy moved to Atlanta to care for her mother, who was an invalid. She worked at the Georgian and Piedmont hotels in Atlanta. McCoy died on July 17, 1967, in a hospital in Atlanta.

== Selected filmography ==
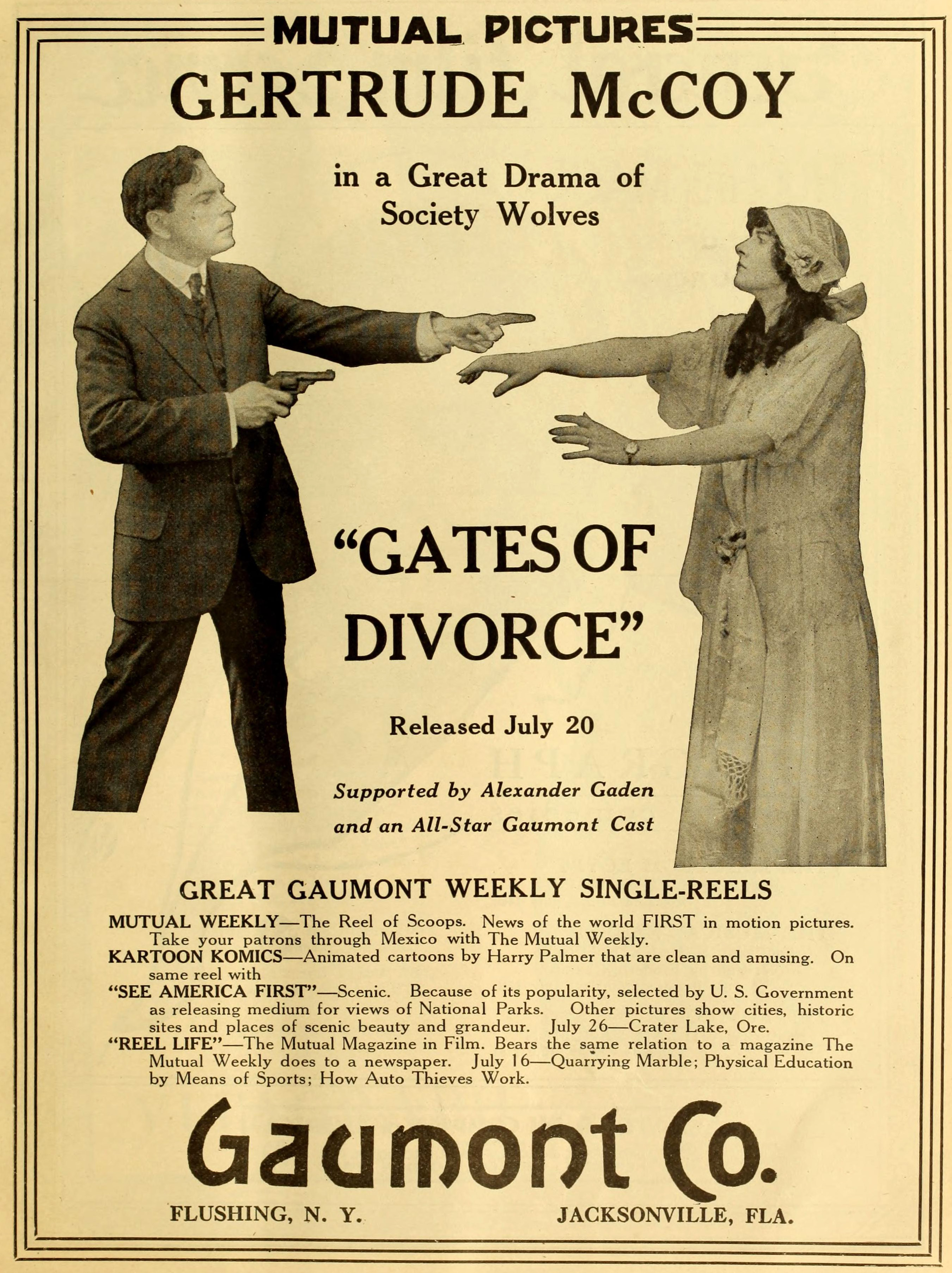
Gates of Divorce (1916)

- A Soldier's Duty (1912)
- A Personal Affair (1912)
- Kitty at Boarding School (1912)
- Cynthia's Agreement (1912)
- Madame Sherry (1917)
- The Silent Witness (1917)
- The Blue Bird (1918)
- The Danger Mark (1918)
- Castle of Dreams (1919)
- Angel Esquire (1919)
- The Auction Mart (1920)
- The Golden Dawn (1921)
- Tell Your Children (1922)
- Was She Guilty? (1922)
- Always Tell Your Wife (1923)
- Heartstrings (1923)
- The Temptation of Carlton Earle (1923)
- A Royal Divorce (1923)
- The Diamond Man (1924)
- Chappy: That's All (1924)
- Miriam Rozella (1924)
- Nets of Destiny (1924)
- Verborgene Gluten (1925)
- Nelson (1926)
