= The Green Terror =

- Directed by: W. P. Kellino
- Written by: W.C. Clifford
- Based on: The Green Rust by Edgar Wallace
- Starring: Aurelio Sidney; Heather Thatcher; W.T. Ellwanger; Cecil del Gue
- Production company: Gaumont British Picture Corporation
- Distributed by: Gaumont British Distributors
- Release date: July 1919
- Running time: 6 reels
- Country: United Kingdom
- Languages: Silent; English intertitles

The Green Terror is a 1919 British silent crime film directed by W. P. Kellino and starring Aurelio Sidney, Heather Thatcher and W.T. Ellwanger. It is based on the 1919 novel The Green Rust by Edgar Wallace. An American detective battles an evil Doctor who plans to destroy the world's wheat supplies.

== Cast ==
- Aurelio Sidney as Beale
- Heather Thatcher as Olive Crosswell
- W.T. Ellwanger as Dr. Harden
- Cecil del Gue as Punsunby
- Maud Yates as Hilda Glaum
- Arthur Poole as Kitson

== Bibliography ==
- Low, Rachael. History of the British Film, 1918–1929. George Allen & Unwin, 1971.
