= Edwin Gerald Jones Biss =

English motoring journalist & author (1876-1922)

- Born: 1876; Cambridge, England
- Died: 1922 (aged 45–46)
- Education: The Leys School, Cambridge; University College; Trinity Hall, Cambridge
- Occupations: motoring journalist and author of short stories
- Spouse: Sarah Ann Coutts Allan (m. 1905)
- Children: 2

Edwin Gerald Jones Biss (1876–1922) was an English motoring journalist and author of short stories. His stories were often serialised in journals and newspapers.

== Family ==
Biss was born in Cambridge, England; his mother was Janet Jones from Otago, New Zealand; his father was physician Cecil Yates Biss. He was educated at University College, The Leys School and Trinity Hall, Cambridge.

In the 1901 census, Biss was recorded as visiting Offham Farm, just north of Arundel in Sussex. The farm was owned by Alexander Allan (Allen) who was from Marnech, Banffshire, Scotland. In 1905 Biss married his daughter Sarah Ann Coutts Allan (1878-1952); they had two children: Couttie Margaret Janet Biss (1907-1988) and Godfrey Charles D'arcy Biss (1910-1989).

Biss collapsed and died at age 46 whilst visiting his friend Alfred Eyde Manning Foster. Biss' four brothers pre-deceased him; the eldest, Major Harold Cecil Jones Biss, died in 1921 aged 51. Another brother, Dr. Hubert Elwyn Jones Biss (1871-1909), was one of the physicians who attended William Ewart Gladstone during his final illness and death at Hawarden Castle.

== Career ==
Biss originally planned a career in the legal profession, but he found success in writing short stories. By 1901, he was describing himself as an "author". In 1903, Biss' his work was regularly appearing in newspapers around the United Kingdom. His works included serialised stories such as The Imposter; Bob Pharazin’s Madness; The White Rose; Who Killed Montagu Jerningham and later The Shadow of the Scaffold. The Dupe was published in 1907 and in 1908 The Fated Five – The Tale of a Great Tontine. This was followed by Branded, a story that in 1921 was made into a movie starring Josephine Earle. The House of Terror was published in 1909 and the Undying Dread serialised in 1911.

The Door of the Unreal, published in 1920, was a werewolf story and a change of genre for Biss. His serialisations were also syndicated in the United States and Australia.

In addition to fiction, Biss wrote articles about motoring. His work was published in The Times, the Evening Standard, the Evening News, The Observer, the Daily Mail, The Sketch and Vanity Fair. In 1909 he published a book called Motoring Dicta, a compendium of his newspaper articles.
