= The Fordington Twins =

1920 film

- Directed by: W. P. Kellino
- Written by: Edgar Newton Bungey (novel); Paul Rooff
- Starring: Dallas Anderson; Mary Brough; Nita Russell; Cyril Smith
- Production company: Gaumont British
- Release date: August 1920
- Running time: 6 reels
- Country: United Kingdom
- Languages: Silent; English intertitles

The Fordington Twins is a 1920 British silent drama film directed by W. P. Kellino and starring Dallas Anderson, Mary Brough and Nita Russell. It is based on a novel by Edgar Newton Bungey. Two young brothers who live over a fishmongers in Bethnal Green inherit a large sum of money and a country estate, but are almost cheated out of it by a swindler.

== Cast ==
- Dallas Anderson as Basil Markham
- Mary Brough as Mrs. Margaretson
- Nita Russell as Pat Wentworth
- Cyril Smith as Cyril Raleigh
- Whimsical Walker as Snagsby
- Cecil del Gue as Mr. Wentworth

== Bibliography ==
- Bamford, Kenton. Distorted Images: British National Identity and Film in the 1920s. I.B. Tauris, 1999.
- Low, Rachael. History of the British Film, 1918–1929. George Allen & Unwin, 1971.
