= Francis Lister =

British actor (1899–1951)

- Born: 2 April 1899; London, England, UK
- Died: 28 October 1951 (aged 52); London, England, UK
- Occupation: Actor
- Years active: 1920–1951
- Spouses: Nora Swinburne (m. 1924; div. 1932) Margot Grahame (m. 1934; div. 1936)

Francis Lister (2 April 1899 – 28 October 1951) was a British actor. He was married to the actresses Nora Swinburne (1924–32) and Margot Grahame (1934-36).

== Filmography ==
| Year | Title | Role | Notes |
|---|---|---|---|
| 1920 | Branded | Ralph Shopwyke | |
| 1921 | The Fortune of Christina McNab | Duke of Southwark | |
| 1921 | The Old Wives' Tale | Cyril Povey | |
| 1923 | Should a Doctor Tell? | Roger Davies | |
| 1923 | Boden's Boy | David Wayne | |
| 1923 | Comin' Thro the Rye | Roger Davies | |
| 1924 | The Unwanted | John Dearsley | |
| 1924 | Chappy - That's All | | |
| 1929 | Atlantic | Padre | |
| 1930 | At the Villa Rose | Weathermill | |
| 1931 | Uneasy Virtue | Bill Rendell | |
| 1931 | Brown Sugar | Lord Sloane | |
| 1932 | Jack's the Boy | Jules Martin | |
| 1933 | Counsel's Opinion | James Gowan | |
| 1933 | Up to the Neck | Eric Warwick | |
| 1933 | Hawleys of High Street | Lord Roxton | |
| 1935 | Clive of India | Edmund Maskelyne | |
| 1935 | Cardinal Richelieu | Prince Gaston | |
| 1935 | Mutiny on the Bounty | Captain Nelson | |
| 1936 | Living Dangerously | Dr. Henry Pryor | |
| 1936 | Sensation | Richard Grainger | |
| 1937 | Return of the Scarlet Pimpernel | Chauvelin | |
| 1939 | Murder in Soho | Joe | |
| 1944 | The Hundred Pound Window | Capt. Johnson | |
| 1944 | Henry V | Duke of Orleans | |
| 1945 | The Wicked Lady | Lord Kingsclere | |
| 1949 | Christopher Columbus | King Ferdinand | |
| 1951 | Home to Danger | Howard Wainwright | (final film role) |
