= Castle of Dreams (1919 film) =

1919 British film by Wilfred Noy

- Directed by: Wilfred Noy
- Starring: Mary Odette; Fred Groves; Gertrude McCoy
- Production company: British Actors
- Release date: June 1919
- Country: United Kingdom
- Languages: Silent; English intertitles

Castle of Dreams is a 1919 British silent drama film directed by Wilfred Noy and starring Mary Odette, Fred Groves and Gertrude McCoy.

== Cast ==
- Mary Odette as Lorelei Redfern
- Fred Groves as John Morton
- Gertrude McCoy as Irene Redfern
- A. E. Matthews as Gerald Sumner
- Henry Vibart as David Redfern
- Mrs. Charles MacDona as Mrs. Trundle

== Bibliography ==
- Bamford, Kenton. Distorted images: British national identity and film in the 1920s. I.B. Tauris, 1999.
- Low, Rachael. The History of the British Film 1918-1929. George Allen & Unwin, 1971.
