= The Dizzy Limit =

1930 British film by Edward Dryhurst

Kidnapped
- Story feature on the film in Boy's Cinema (5 July, 1930)
- Directed by: Edward Dryhurst
- Produced by: Edward G. Whiting
- Starring: Jasper Maskelyne; Joy Windsor; Wallace Bosco
- Production company: Edward G. Whiting Productions
- Release date: 2 January 1931
- Running time: 0 minutes
- Country: United Kingdom
- Language: English

The Dizzy Limit (also known as Kidnapped) is a sound 1930 British comedy film directed by Edward Dryhurst and starring Jasper Maskelyne, Joy Windsor and Wallace Bosco. While the film has no audible dialog, it features a synchronized musical score, singing and sound effects on the soundtrack. The film was initially a silent film and was delayed from release until a soundtrack could be added.

According to Maskelyne, The Dizzy Limit was the last film made in the United Kingdom without audible dialogue.

== Preservation status ==
The British Film Institute National Archive holds a collection of ephemera but no film or video materials.

== Plot ==
The manager of a theatre offers a £10,000 prize to a committee if the magician Jasper Montague fails to produce a woman from a box twenty-four hours after it has been locked and sealed on the theatre's stage. A gang of crooks manipulate their way onto the committee, and kidnap Jasper's female assistant. Jasper tracks them down and locates her, but his rescue attempt fails, and the criminals force him at gunpoint to return to the theatre and open the box . To everyone's amazement, the girl is inside, having secretly escaped her captors and slipped back into the theatre just in time.

== Cast ==
- Jasper Maskelyne as Jasper Montague
- Joy Windsor as June
- Wallace Bosco as Woolf
- Dino Galvani as Pierpoint
- George Wilson as Gus
- Ian Wilson as callboy

== Reception ==
Film Weekly wrote: "Here is an out-and-out melodrama built around the plan of some crooks to spoil an illusionist's masterpiece and thus obtain the £10,000 guarantee by which he backs his skill. There is little in this film besides chases and fights, but the presence of Maskelyne gives it some interest. Jasper Maskelyne is the famous illusionist who thrills London by his amazing trickery. This is his first appearance in talkies."

Kine Weekly wrote: "The fact that the famous illusionist appears as the hero of this film is the main point of interest in an otherwise undistinguished production. ... Jasper Maskelyne looks as if he might do quite a lot under better direction. ... The technical qualities are hardly abreast of the times, and the story lacks punch and conviction. There is a certain novely in the type of story chosen, and a well-shot car chase on the usual lines."

The Daily Film Renter wrote: "Quota picture with synchronised score. A passable program support for small popular halls, filmed in the old-fashioned way, but the story holds the attention. ... Production methods are very unostentatious, but the story is fairly interesting, and the picture might prove worth booking by the smaller run of halls."
