= Little Miss Nobody (1923 film) =

1923 film

- Directed by: Wilfred Noy
- Written by: John Grahame (play)
- Starring: Flora le Breton; John Stuart; Ben Field; Gladys Jennings
- Production company: Carlton Films
- Distributed by: Butcher's Film Service
- Release date: June 1923
- Country: United Kingdom
- Languages: Silent; English intertitles

Little Miss Nobody is a 1923 British silent comedy film directed by Wilfred Noy and starring Flora le Breton, John Stuart and Ben Field. The film was described as a farce.

== Plot ==
The caretaker of a Scottish castle tries to trick his aunt into believing that some of the guests are aristocrats.

== Cast ==
- Flora le Breton as Miss Nobody
- John Stuart as Guy Cheviot
- Ben Field as Potter
- Gladys Jennings as Lady Violet
- Sidney Paxton as Dominie
- Eva Westlake as Lady Stilton
- Alfred Clark as Earl of Cripplegate
- Donald Searle as Gussie
- Aubrey Fitzgerald as Jock
- James Reardon as Manager

== Production ==
Le Breton and Suart had already been paired the same year in The Mistletoe Bough. The film was shot in 1922.

== Reception ==
"Flora le Breton makes the most of the part of Little Miss Nobody", commented The Film Renter.

== Bibliography ==
- Low, Rachael. The History of the British Film 1918-1929. George Allen & Unwin, 1971.
