= Frank Dane (actor) =

British actor (1885–1957)

Frank Hughbert Thomas Crust (7 June 1885 – 1957), known professionally as Frank Dane, was a British actor of the silent era.

Dane was born on 7 June 1885 in Deal, Kent. He died in 1957 at age 71 in Chichester, Sussex.

== Selected filmography ==
- A Daughter of England (1915)
- Justice (1917)
- Democracy (1918)
- Hindle Wakes (1918)
- The Romance of Lady Hamilton (1919)
- Lorna Doone (1920)
- Uncle Dick's Darling (1920)
- The Black Tulip (1921)
- Blood Money (1921)
- Innocent (1921)
- Silent Evidence (1922)
- Creation (1922)
- I Pagliacci (1923)
- The Hoosier Schoolmaster (1924)
- Detective Lloyd (1931), a serial
