= Rob Roy (1922 film) =

1922 film by W. P. Kellino

- Directed by: W. P. Kellino
- Written by: Alice Ramsey
- Starring: David Hawthorne; Gladys Jennings; Simeon Stuart; Wallace Bosco
- Cinematography: Basil Emmott
- Production company: Gaumont British Picture Corporation
- Distributed by: Gaumont British Picture Corporation
- Release date: September 1922
- Running time: 6,100 feet
- Country: United Kingdom
- Language: English

Rob Roy is a 1922 British silent historical film directed by W. P. Kellino and starring David Hawthorne, Gladys Jennings and Simeon Stuart. It depicts the life of the early 18th century outlaw Rob Roy MacGregor.

== Cast ==
- David Hawthorne as Rob Roy MacGregor
- Gladys Jennings as Helen Campbell
- Simeon Stuart as Duke of Montrose
- Wallace Bosco as James Grahame
- Alec Hunter as The Dougal Creature
- Tom Morris as Sandy the Biter
- Eva Llewellyn as Mother MacGregor
- Roy Kellino as Ronald MacGregor, the Child

== Bibliography ==
- Low, Rachael. History of the British Film, 1918–1929. George Allen & Unwin, 1971.
