= The Shadow Between (1920 film) =

1920 British crime film

- Directed by: George Dewhurst
- Based on: The Shadow Between by Silas Hocking
- Release date: 1920
- Country: United Kingdom
- Language: Silent

The Shadow Between is a 1920 British silent crime film directed by George Dewhurst and starring Doris Lloyd, Lewis Dayton and Simeon Stuart. It was adapted from the 1908 novel by Silas Hocking. The screenplay concerns a young Australian girl who travels to Britain after the death of her English father, who was a miner.

== Cast ==
- Doris Lloyd ... Marian West
- Lewis Dayton ... Clement Mawgan
- Simeon Stuart ... Lord Grovely
- Cherry Winter ... Esther Mawgan
- Gertrude Sterroll ... Mrs. Mawgan
- Wallace Bosco ... Dick West
- Billie Berkeley ... Julia Treven
- Horace Corbyn ... Mr. Jackson
- W. Lane-Bayliff ... Mr. Evans
