= Nora Swinburne =

British actress (1902–2000)

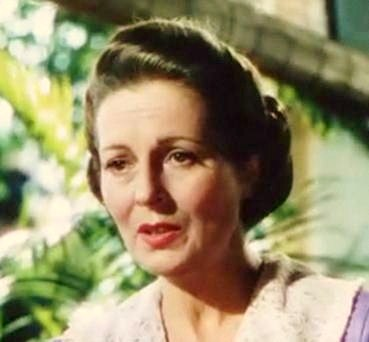
- Swinburne in the trailer for The River (1951)
- Born: Leonora Mary Johnson; 24 July 1902; Bath, Somerset, England
- Died: 1 May 2000 (aged 97); London, England
- Education: Royal Academy of Dramatic Art
- Occupation: Actress
- Years active: 1920–1974
- Spouses: Francis Lister (m. 1924; div. 1932) Edward Ashley-Cooper (m. 1934; div. 1938) Esmond Knight (m. 1946; died 1987)
- Children: 1

Leonora Mary Johnson (24 July 1902 – 1 May 2000), known professionally as Nora Swinburne, was an English actress who appeared in many British films.

== Early years ==
Swinburne was born in Bath, Somerset, the daughter of Henry Swinburne Johnson and his wife Leonora Tamar (née Brain). She was educated at Rosholme College, Weston-super-Mare, and studied for the stage at the Royal Academy of Dramatic Art. As a member of Clive Currie's Young Players in 1914, she appeared at the Grand, Croydon, Court and Little Theatres, during that year.

In 1914, she attended an audition with the ballerina Phyllis Bedells and later Anna Pavlova who considered her too young, even if very talented, for the corps de ballet. Nora instead joined the Italia Conti school where she obtained her first real part as a child actress in Where the Rainbow Ends. She performed in the show in London and in all the big cities of Britain for eighteen shillings (90p) a week.

At the end of 1915 she gained a place at the Royal Academy of Dramatic Art. While still a student at the academy she appeared at the New Theatre on 11 April 1916 as the Wild Flowers in Paddly Pools; appeared at the Comedy Theatre, September 1916, as a dancer in the revue, This and That; and in October 1916 appeared in Samples at the Globe Theatre (now the Gielgud Theatre). She also appeared at the Globe in March 1917 as Gabrielle in Suzette. Other early roles included Lulu in Yes, Uncle! at the Prince of Wales Theatre in December 1917, and Regina Waterhouse at the Strand Theatre in December 1918.

At the Apollo Theatre in 1919 she played the title role in Tilly of Bloomsbury "for about six weeks", according to her personal notes in Who's Who in the Theatre, followed by the role of Roselle in The Betrothal at the Gaiety in January 1921, concluding the year with what she charmingly called "several cinema plays".

== Stage career ==
Subsequent theatre roles included:

- Miss Dale Ogden in The Bat, St James's Theatre, January 1922
- Evadne in The Mountebank, Lyceum Theatre, New York, May 1923
- Sheila in Mary, Mary, Quite Contrary, Belasco Theatre, New York, September 1923
- Lorna Webster in In the Next Room, St Martin's Theatre, London, June 1924
- Veronica Duane in You and I, The Little Theatre, John Adam Street, London WC1, December 1924
- Joan Lee Tevis in Tarnish, Vaudeville Theatre, March 1925
- Nora in Number 17, New Theatre, August 1925
- Marion Lennox in The Best People, Lyric Theatre, March 1926
- Lady Blair in Regatta, and Ann in Outward Bound by Sutton Vane, Prince of Wales Theatre, January 1928
- Susan Cunningham in The Fourth Wall, Haymarket, February 1928
- Hyacinth in Out She Goes Criterion Theatre, December 1928
- Sonia in Fame, St James's Theatre, February 1929 (108 performances)
- Sylvia Arnitage in Murder on the Second Floor, Lyric Theatre, June 1929
- Yolande Probyn in Lady Clara, Booth Theatre, New York, April 1930
- Betty Mainwaring in Lucky Dip, Comedy Theatre, October 1930
- Laurel Prescottin in The Ninth Man, Prince of Wales Theatre, February 1931
- Helen in Disturbance, Grafton Theatre, July 1931
- Fay d’Allary in The Gay Adventure, Whitehall Theatre, December 1931
- Lady Moynton in Never Come Back, Phoenix Theatre, October 1932
- Anne Vernon in It’s You I Want, Daly's Theatre, February 1933
- Sybil Kingdom in The Old Folks at Home, Queens Theatre, December 1933
- Helen Storer in Lovers' Leap, Vaudeville Theatre, October 1934
- Phyllis Manton in All Rights Reserved, Criterion Theatre, April 1935
- Helen Westdrake in Disturbance (for Charta Theatre), Westminster Theatre, May 1935
- Marie in Sauce for the Gander, St Martin's Theatre, January 1936
- Judith Godfrey in The King’s Leisure, Daly's Theatre, May 1936
- Louise Dexter in The Astonished Ostrich, Duke of York's Theatre, December 1936
- Tony Campion in Wise To- Morrow (Stephen Powys), Lyric Theatre, February 1937 (first co-starring with future husband Esmond Knight as Peter Marsh)
- Lady Hazel in African Dawn, Daly's Theatre, May 1937
- Maryka in The Laughing Cavalier, Adelphi Theatre, October 1937
- Edith Cartrwright in Dodsworth, Palace Theatre, February 1938
- Dinah Lot in Lot’s Wife (for London International), Duke of York's Theatre, April 1938; then under her own management at the Whitehall Theatre, June 1938; subsequently transferring to the Aldwych and Savoy Theatres.
- Fanny Grey in Autumn Crocus, King's Theatre, Hammersmith, April 1939
- Ann Mordaunt in Third Party Risk, St Martin's Theatre, May 1939
- Mrs Oswald Pink in Married For Money, Aldwych Theatre, November 1939
- Frances Courtenay in The Peaceful Inn, Duke of York's Theatre, May 1940
- Mrs. Purdie in Dear Brutus (Barrie), Globe Theatre, January 1941
- Sorel Tree in Ducks and Drakes, Apollo Theatre, November 1941
- Carole Markoff in Full Swing, Palace Theatre, April 1942
- Succeeded Valerie Taylor as Natalia Petrovna in A Month in the Country, St James's Theatre, August 1943
- Succeeded Diana Wynyard as Sara Muller in Watch on the Rhine, Aldwych Theatre, October 1943
- Diana Wentworth in The Years Between, Wyndham's Theatre, January 1945 ("which ran for over a year.")
- Lady Clare Marten in Miranda, Embassy Theatre, June 1947
- Elsa Meredith in Honour and Obey, Saville Theatre, November 1947
- Caroline Ashley in Caroline, Arts Theatre, March 1949
- Jane Cooper in Red Letter Day, Garrick Theatre. February 1952
- Mrs. Arbuthnot in A Woman of No Importance, Savoy Theatre, February 1953
- Naomi Martyn in The Secret Tent, Grand Theatre, Blackpool, October 1954
- Mrs. Astley in The Lost Generation, Garrick Theatre, June 1955
- Adelaide Lovell in The Call of the Dodo, Theatre Royal, Nottingham, October 1955
- Catherine Hayling in Fool’s Paradise, Apollo Theatre, April 1959
- Diana in I Seem To Know Your Face, Everyman Theatr, Cheltenham, June 1960
- Chief Minister's Wife in Music at Midnight (Peter Howard), Westminster Theatre, May 1962; subsequently touring the US, January 1963
- Liz in All Good Children, Hampstead Theatre Club, April 1964
- Violet in The Family Reunion, 69 Theatre Company, Manchester, October 1973
- Julia Shuttlethwaite in The Cocktail Party, 69 Theatre Company, Manchester, September 1975

== Filmography ==
- Branded (1920) as Doris Jerningham
- Saved from the Sea (1920) as Nancy Brooks
- The Fortune of Christina McNab (1921) as Christina McNab
- The Autumn of Pride (1921) as Peggy Naylor
- Alone in the Jungle (1922) as Lydia Gyldendal
- Wee MacGregor's Sweetheart (1922) as Jessie Mary
- The White Desert (1922) as Karin
- Hornet's Nest (1923) as Lady Rona
- The Unwanted (1924) as Joyce Mannering
- His Grace Gives Notice (1924) as Cynthia Bannock
- A Girl of London (1925) as Vee-Vee
- One Colombo Night (1926) as Jean Caldicott
- Alf's Button (1930) as Lady Isobel Fitzpeter
- Caste (1930) as Esther Eccles
- These Charming People (1931) as Julia Berridge
- A Man of Mayfair (1931) as Elaine Barclay
- Potiphar's Wife (1931) as Lady Diana Bromford
- A Voice Said Goodnight (1932) as Joan Creighton
- Mr. Bill the Conqueror (1932) as Diana Trenchard
- White Face (1932) as Inez Landor
- Perfect Understanding (1933) as Lady Stephanie Fitzmaurice
- Too Many Wives (1933) as Hilary Wildely
- The Office Wife (1934) as Anne
- Boomerang (1934) as Elizabeth Stafford
- Lend Me Your Husband (1935) as Virgie Green
- Jury's Evidence (1936) as Mary Trent
- The Gay Adventure (1936) as Fay d'Allary
- Lonely Road (1936) as Lady Anne
- Dinner at the Ritz (1937) as Lady Railton
- The Citadel (1938) as Mrs. Thornton
- Lily of Laguna (1938) as Gloria Grey
- It Happened to One Man (1940) as Alice Quair
- The Farmer's Wife (1941) as Araminta Grey
- They Flew Alone (1942) as ATA Commandant
- The Man in Grey (1943) as Mrs. Fitzherbert
- Dear Octopus (1943) as Edna
- Fanny by Gaslight (1944) as Mrs. Hopwood
- They Knew Mr. Knight (1946) as Celia Blake
- Jassy (1947) as Mrs. Hatton
- Good-Time Girl (1948) as Miss Mills
- The Blind Goddess (1948) as Lady Dearing
- Quartet (1948) as Mrs. Peregrine (segment "The Colonel's Lady")
- The Bad Lord Byron (1949) as Lady Jersey
- Fools Rush In (1949) as Angela Dickson
- Marry Me! (1949) as Enid Lawson
- Christopher Columbus (1949) as Joanna de Torres
- Landfall (1949) as Admiral's Wife
- My Daughter Joy (1950) as Ava Constantin
- The River (1951) as The Mother
- Quo Vadis (1951) as Pomponia
- Betrayed (1954) as "The Scarf's" Mother
- The End of the Affair (1955) as Mrs. Bertram
- Helen of Troy (1956) as Hecuba
- The Strange Awakening (1958) as Mrs. Friend
- Third Man on the Mountain (1959) as Frau Matt
- Conspiracy of Hearts (1960) as Sister Tia
- Decision at Midnight (1963) as Margaret
- A Man Could Get Killed (1966) as Lady Frazier (uncredited)
- Interlude (1968) as Mary
- Anne of the Thousand Days (1969) as Lady Kingston
- Up the Chastity Belt (1971) as Lady-in-Waiting

== Television appearances ==
- The Forsyte Saga (BBC, 1967) as Aunt Hester Forsyte
- Fall of Eagles (BBC, 1974) as Katharina Schratt

== Sources ==
- Who's Who in the Theatre, various editions, from the 8th (1936) to the 16th (1977)
- London Stage in the 20th Century, Robert Tanitch, Haus Books (2007); ISBN 978-1-904950-74-5
- Ephraim Katz, The Macmillan International Film Encyclopedia, Pan Macmillan (1994); ISBN 0-333-61601-4
- HaIliwell's Who's Who in the Movies, 4th edition, HarperCollins (2006); ISBN 0-00-716957-4
