= Charles Quatermaine =

British actor (1877–1958)

With Viola Tree in 1907 production of A Woman of No Importance at His Majesty's Theatre, London

Charles Quatermaine (30 December 1877 in Richmond, Surrey – August 1958 in Sussex) was a British stage and film actor. He also appeared on Broadway. He was the second husband of actress Mary Forbes, and brother of Leon Quartermaine.

== Filmography ==
Year	Title	Role	Notes
1919	Westward Ho!	Don Guzman	
1919	The Lady Clare	Marquis of Hartlepool	
1920	The Auction Mart	Jacqueline's Father	
1920	The Face at the Window	Lucien deGradoff	
1924	The Eleventh Commandment	James Mountford	
1929	The Thirteenth Chair	Dr. Philip Mason	
1929	The Bishop Murder Case	John Pardee	
1930	Redemption	Artimiev	(scenes deleted)
1931	A Man of Mayfair	Dalton	
1935	Drake of England	Parson Fletcher	
