= The Fall of a Saint =

1920 film

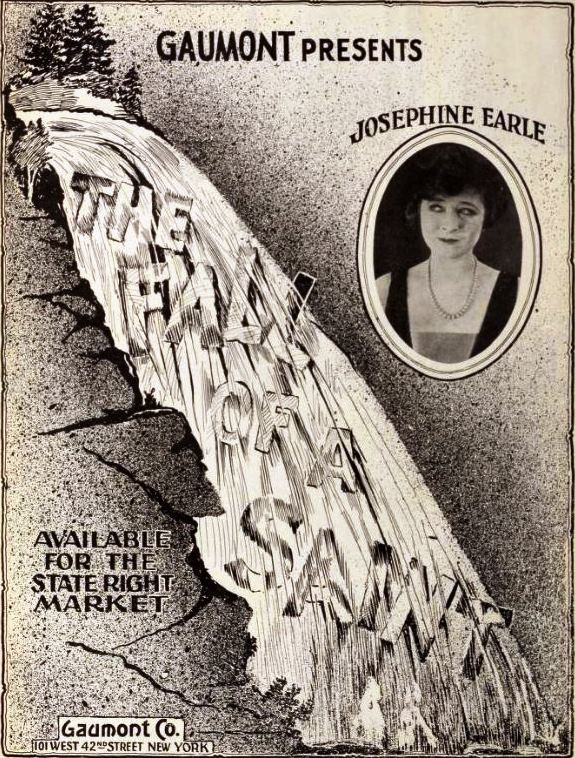
- American advertisement for film
- Directed by: W. P. Kellino
- Written by: Eric Clement Scott (novel)
- Starring: Josephine Earle; Gerald Lawrence; W.T. Ellwanger; Dallas Anderson
- Production company: Gaumont British Picture Corporation
- Distributed by: Gaumont British Distributors
- Release date: January 1920
- Running time: 6,000 feet
- Country: United Kingdom
- Language: Silent (English intertitles)

The Fall of a Saint is a 1920 British silent crime film directed by W. P. Kellino and starring Josephine Earle, Gerald Lawrence, and Dallas Anderson. It was based on a novel by Eric Clement Scott, and made at Lime Grove Studios in Shepherd's Bush.

== Cast ==
- Josephine Earle as Countess de la Merthe
- Gerald Lawrence as Claude Maitland
- Dallas Anderson as Count de la Merthe
- W.T. Ellwanger as Elkin Smith
- R. Heaton Grey as Lord Norten
- Reginald Culhane as Sport Kenkinson
- Thea Godfrey as Katie Thimm

== Bibliography ==
- Low, Rachael. History of the British Film, 1918–1929. George Allen & Unwin, 1971.
