= The Autumn of Pride =

1921 film by W. P. Kellino

- Directed by: W. P. Kellino
- Written by: Paul Rooff
- Starring: Nora Swinburne; David Hawthorne; Mary Dibley; Cecil Morton York
- Production company: Westminster Films
- Distributed by: Gaumont British Distributors
- Release date: July 1921
- Running time: 6,000 feet
- Country: United Kingdom
- Languages: Silent; English intertitles

The Autumn of Pride is a 1921 British silent romance film directed by W. P. Kellino and starring Nora Swinburne, David Hawthorne and Mary Dibley. It was an adaptation of a novel by E. Newton Bungay.

== Cast ==
- Nora Swinburne as Peggy Naylor
- David Hawthorne as John Lytton
- Mary Dibley as Helen Stone
- Cecil Morton York as Abel Lytton
- Cecil del Gue as Mr. Naylor
- Clifford Heatherley as George Pentecost
- Donald Castle as Willoughby
- C. Hargrave Mansell as Handley

== Bibliography ==
- Low, Rachael. History of the British Film, 1918–1929. George Allen & Unwin, 1971.
