= The Curse of the Hidden Vault =

1964 film directed by Franz Josef Gottlieb

- Film poster
- Directed by: Franz Josef Gottlieb
- Written by: Robert A. Stemmle; Franz Josef Gottlieb
- Based on: Angel Esquire by Edgar Wallace
- Produced by: Horst Wendlandt
- Starring: Harald Leipnitz; Judith Dornys; Rudolf Forster
- Cinematography: Richard Angst
- Edited by: Jutta Hering
- Music by: Peter Thomas
- Production company: Rialto Film
- Distributed by: Constantin Film
- Release date: 30 April 1964
- Running time: 90 minutes
- Country: West Germany
- Language: German

The Curse of the Hidden Vault (German: Die Gruft mit dem Rätselschloß) is a 1964 black and white West German crime film directed by Franz Josef Gottlieb and starring Harald Leipnitz, Eddi Arent, Siegfried Schürenberg and Klaus Kinski. It is based on the 1908 novel Angel Esquire by Edgar Wallace, previously made into a British silent film.

It was shot at the Spandau Studios and Tempelhof Studios in Berlin and on location in London. The film's sets were designed by the art directors Wilhelm Vorwerg and Walter Kutz.

== Cast ==
- Harald Leipnitz as Jimmy Flynn
- Judith Dornys as Kathleen Kent
- Rudolf Forster as Real
- Werner Peters as Spedding
- Ernst Fritz Fürbringer as Connor
- Siegfried Schürenberg as Sir John
- Harry Meyen as Inspector Angel
- Vera Tschechowa as Feder-Lissy
- Ilse Steppat as Margaret
- Harry Wüstenhagen as Goyle
- Kurd Pieritz as Cyril
- Klaus Kinski as George
- Eddi Arent as Ferry Westlake
- Kurt Waitzmann as Mr. Simpson
- Arthur Binder as Bat Sand
- Kurt Jaggberg as Vinnis

== Reception ==
The FSK gave the film a rating of "16 and older" and found it not appropriate for screenings on public holidays. The film premiered on 30 April 1964.

== Bibliography ==
- Bergfelder, Tim. International Adventures: German Popular Cinema and European Co-Productions in the 1960s. Berghahn Books, 2005.
