= The Other Woman (1931 film) =

1931 film

- Directed by: G. B. Samuelson
- Written by: Olga Hall Brown
- Produced by: Edward Gordon Craig
- Starring: Isobel Elsom; David Hawthorne; Eva Moore
- Cinematography: Geoffrey Faithfull
- Production company: Majestic Film Company
- Distributed by: United Artists
- Release date: June 1931
- Running time: 64 minutes
- Country: United Kingdom
- Language: English

The Other Woman is a 1931 British drama film directed by G. B. Samuelson and starring Isobel Elsom, David Hawthorne and Eva Moore. It was written by Olga Hall Brown and was made as a quota quickie.

== Preservation status ==
The British Film Institute National Archive holds a collection of stills but no film or video materials.

== Cast ==
- Isobel Elsom as Roxanne Paget
- David Hawthorne as Anthony Paget
- Eva Moore as Mrs. Wycherly
- Pat Paterson as Prudence Wycherly
- Gladys Frazin as Minerva Derwent
- Jane Vaughan as Marian
- Mervin Pearce
- Sam Wilkinson

== Reception ==
Film Weekly wrote: "One of those deadly serious subjects beloved, apparently, by smaller British producers is here developed with a great deal of earnestness but little entertainment value. ... A prodigious quantity of dialogue with little real notion, either of story or of the characters, make the film slow and dull. And the acting is not of a quality distinguished enough to save it."

Kine Weekly wrote: "It cannot be said that The Other Woman enhances the value of British pictures. The story has possibilities, but they have been poorly exploited. Neither acting nor production reaches a good standard, but the picture may draw on account of the star and a blameless moral tone."

Picture Show wrote: "Very 'Society' with long, stilted, moralising speeches, and dragging development. The players do their best and deserve sympathy."
