= The Mating of Marcus =

1924 film

- Directed by: W. P. Kellino
- Written by: Mabel Grundy (novel)
- Starring: David Hawthorne; George Bellamy; Moore Marriott
- Production company: Stoll Pictures
- Distributed by: Stoll Pictures
- Release date: July 1924
- Running time: 6,000 feet
- Country: United Kingdom
- Languages: Silent; English intertitles

The Mating of Marcus is a 1924 British silent romance film directed by W. P. Kellino and starring David Hawthorne, George Bellamy and Moore Marriott. It was based on a novel by Mabel Grundy.

== Cast ==
- David Hawthorne – Marcus Netherby
- George Bellamy – Mr. Chester
- Moore Marriott – Reverend Cheffins
- Mollie Johnson – Valerie Westmacott
- Pauline Cartwright – Vivi Chester
- Beatrice Ford – Naomi Chester

== Bibliography ==
- Low, Rachael. History of the British Film, 1918–1929. George Allen & Unwin, 1971.
