= Miriam Rozella =

1924 film

- Directed by: Sidney Morgan
- Written by: B.L. Farjeon (novel); Sidney Morgan
- Starring: Moyna Macgill; Owen Nares; Gertrude McCoy; Ben Webster
- Production company: Astra-National
- Distributed by: Astra Film
- Release date: March 1924
- Country: United Kingdom
- Languages: Silent; English intertitles

Miriam Rozella is a 1924 British silent drama film directed by Sidney Morgan and starring Moyna Macgill, Owen Nares and Gertrude McCoy.

== Cast ==
- Moyna Macgill as Miriam Rozella
- Owen Nares as Rudolph
- Gertrude McCoy as Lura Wood
- Henrietta Watson as Lady Laverack
- Ben Webster as Lord Laverock
- Nina Boucicault as Mrs. Rozella
- Russell Thorndike as Crewe Stevens
- Mary Brough as Housekeeper
- Gordon Craig as Cecil Rozelle
- Sydney Paxton as Priest

== Bibliography ==
- Low, Rachael. The History of the British Film 1918-1929. George Allen & Unwin, 1971.
