= Mr. Bill the Conqueror =

1932 film

- Trade show advertisement
- Directed by: Norman Walker
- Written by: Dion Titheradge
- Produced by: Norman Walker
- Starring: Henry Kendall; Heather Angel; Nora Swinburne
- Cinematography: Claude Friese-Greene
- Edited by: Sam Simmonds
- Music by: Idris Lewis
- Production company: British International Pictures
- Distributed by: Pathé Pictures
- Release date: 8 August 1932
- Running time: 87 minutes
- Country: United Kingdom
- Language: English

Mr. Bill the Conqueror (also known as Bill, The Conqueror and The Man Who Won) is a 1932 British comedy film directed by Norman Walker and starring Henry Kendall, Heather Angel and Nora Swinburne. It was written by Don Titheradge, and made by British International Pictures at Elstree Studios.

== Plot ==
Hard-up Bill Normand inherits a title, which comes attached to a run-down country estate. He decides to make one of his inherited farms a money-making business, and in doing so antagonises neighbouring farmer Dave Lannick. Hearing that Bill is having an affair with his daughter, Rosemary, Dave throws her out of his home, and then burns down Bill's hay-ricks. Convicted of his crime, Dave helps to repair the damage, and approves Bill and Rosemary's romance.

== Cast ==
- Henry Kendall as Sir William Normand
- Heather Angel as Rosemary Lannick
- Nora Swinburne as Diana Trenchard
- Sam Livesey as Dave Lannick
- Moore Marriott as Tom Turtle
- Louise Tinsley as Deborah Turtle
- Helen Ferrers as Mrs. Priddy
- Sam Wilkinson as Noah
- A. Bromley Davenport as Lord Blagden
- Toni Edgar-Bruce as Lady Blagden
- David Hawthorne as George Jelby
- John Burch
- Lola Duncan
- Roddy Hughes
- Quentin McPhearson
- Anita Sharp-Bolster

== Reception ==
Film Weekly wrote: "A fine British pastoral study, marred by a story which veers from simple comedy to wild melodrama, but so beautifully photographed that it is good, if uneven, entertainment, for those with an eye for pictorial quality."

Kine Weekly wrote: "A delightful but somewhat leisurely drama of the English countryside, which is set in charming English scenery, in every season and mood, beautifully photographed. The story is heavy and conventional, but it is handled with imagination and understanding, is well characterised, and is typically English in its sentiments and humorous relief."

The Daily Film Renter wrote: "Excellent scenes of country life and sport, beautifully photographed and often inherently interesting. Slow development, but incidental humour and an acceptable romantic element. ... The story introduces a great many authentic scenes of the English countryside, and though it stretches the credibilities from time to time, these faults will be overlooked by the average patron, who will enjoy the simple unsubtle drama, with its constant stream of incidental humour."

== Adaptation ==
The script was adapted by Margaret Stanley Wrench into a five-part serial in Pearson's Weekly, starting in the issue of 4 March 1933.
