= Mary Forbes =

British-American actress (1883–1974)

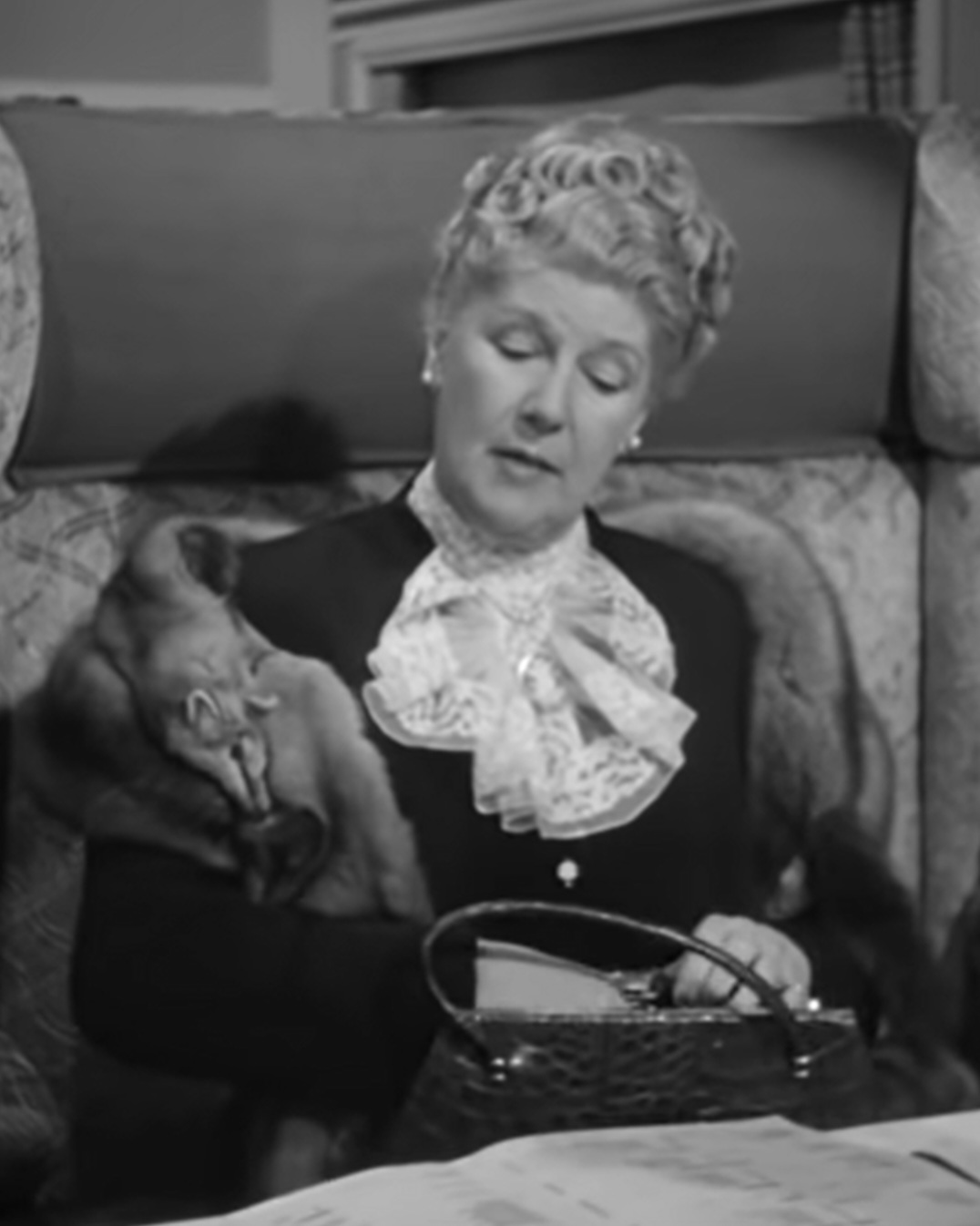
- Forbes in Terror by Night (1946)
- Born: Ethel Louise Young; 1 January 1883; Hornsey, (present-day Haringey), England
- Died: 22 July 1974 (aged 91); Beaumont, California, U.S.
- Occupation: Actress
- Years active: 1919–1958
- Spouse(s): Ernest J. Taylor (m. 1904; div. 19??); Charles Quatermaine (m. 1925; div. 19??) Wesley Wall (m. 1935)
- Children: 3, including Ralph and Brenda Forbes

Mary Forbes (born Ethel Louise Young; 1 January 1883 – 22 July 1974) was a British-American film actress, based in the United States in her latter years, where she died. She appeared in more than 130 films from 1919 to 1958. Forbes was born in Hornsey, England.

She made her first public appearance on the concert platform giving recitals. Her acting debut was in 1908 on the London stage at Aldwych Theatre. Her American stage debut came in Romance at Maxine Elliott's Theatre in 1913.

She took over management of the Ambassadors Theatre in 1913 and had several years experience on stage in Britain and America before her appearances in Hollywood films. Two of her three children by her first marriage in the first quarter of 1904 to Ernest J. Taylor, Ralph and Dorothy Brenda, known as Brenda, were also actors. The middle child of the three, Phyllis Mary Taylor, was not in the acting business. Her second husband was British actor Charles Quartermaine, who married in 1925; the union ended in divorce. She married her third husband, Wesley Wall, an American businessman, in 1935; the couple remained married until her death in 1974.

She became a naturalized United States citizen in 1943, with one of her character references being Lucile Webster Gleason, actress and wife of actor James Gleason.

== Filmography ==
- Women Who Win (1919) – Ella Graham
- The Lady Clare (1919) – Lady Julia Medwin
- Nance (1920) – Felicia Damarche
- Inheritance (1920) – Lady Isabel
- Tillie the Toiler (1927) – Mrs. Fish – Pennington's Mother (uncredited)
- Her Private Life (1929) – Ladu Wildering
- Sunny Side Up (1929) – Mrs. Cromwell
- The Thirteenth Chair (1929) – Lady Crosby
- The Trespasser (1929) – Mrs. Ferguson
- Strictly Unconventional (1930) – Mrs. Anna Shenstone
- So This Is London (1930) – Lady Worthing
- Holiday (1930) – Mrs. Pritchard Ames (uncredited)
- Abraham Lincoln (1930) – Actress (uncredited)
- East Is West (1930) – Mrs. Benson
- The Devil to Pay! (1930) – Mrs. Hope (uncredited)
- The Man Who Came Back (1931) – Mrs. Gaynes
- Born to Love (1931) – The Duchess (uncredited)
- Chances (1931) – Mrs. Ingleside
- The Brat (1931) – Mrs. Mary Forrester
- Working Girls (1931) – Mrs. Johnstone
- Stepping Sisters (1932) – Mrs. Tremaine
- The Silent Witness (1932) – Lady Howard
- Vanity Fair (1932) – Mrs. Sedley
- A Farewell to Arms (1932) – Miss Van Campen
- Shock (1934) – Lady Heatherly
- Cavalcade (1933)
- The Masquerader (1933) – Duchess of Churt (uncredited)
- Bombshell (1933) – Mrs. Middleton
- You Can't Buy Everything (1934) – Kate Farley
- Carolina (1934) – Aunt Catherine (uncredited)
- Sadie McKee (1934) – Mrs. Alderson (uncredited)
- Born to Be Bad (1934) – Admirer at Nightclub (uncredited)
- The Most Precious Thing in Life (1934) – Mrs. Kelsey
- Now I'll Tell (1934) – Mrs. Drake (uncredited)
- Shock (1934) – Lady Heatherly (uncredited)
- Blind Date (1934) – Mrs. Hartwell
- She Was a Lady (1934) – Lady Diana Vane
- Oh Sailor Behave (1934 short)
- British Agent (1934) – Lady Catherine Trehearne
- A Lost Lady (1934) – Mrs. Hardy (uncredited)
- Two Heads on a Pillow (1934) – Mrs. Caroline Devonshire
- Happiness Ahead (1934) – Mrs. Travis
- Transatlantic Merry-Go-Round (1934) – Passenger Campbell Sits Next To (uncredited)
- We Live Again (1934) – Mrs. Kortchagin (uncredited)
- The Painted Veil (1934) – Mrs. Braithwaite (uncredited)
- Roberta (1935) – Mrs. Teale (uncredited)
- McFadden's Flats (1935) (uncredited)
- Laddie (1935) – Mrs. Anna Pryor
- Les Misérables (1935) – Mlle. Baptiseme
- Dizzy Dames (1935) – Mrs. Stokes
- Stranded (1935) – Grace Dean (uncredited)
- Anna Karenina (1935) – Princess Sorokina
- Rendezvous (1935) – Lady Cavendish (uncredited)
- The Perfect Gentleman (1935) – Lady Clyffe-Pembrook
- The Widow from Monte Carlo (1935) – Lady Holloway
- Captain Blood (1935) – Mrs. Steed
- The White Angel (1936) – First Lady Disapproving of Florence (uncredited)
- Wedding Present (1936) – Mrs. Dodacker
- Theodora Goes Wild (1936) – Mrs. Wyatt (uncredited)
- Women of Glamour (1937) – Mrs. Stark
- Another Dawn (1937) – Mrs. Lydia Benton
- Wee Willie Winkie (1937) – Mrs. MacMonachie
- The Life of the Party (1937) – Mrs. Saunders (uncredited)
- One Hundred Men and a Girl (1937) – Concert Hall Patron (uncredited)
- Stage Door (1937) – Cast of Stage Play
- The Awful Truth (1937) – Mrs. Vance
- What Do You Think? (Number Three) (1939 short) – Mrs. Dosier (uncredited)
- Everybody Sing (1938) – Miss Colvin
- Outside of Paradise (1938) – Mrs. Stonewall
- The Rage of Paris (1938) – Woman in Opera Box (uncredited)
- Always Goodbye (1938) – Aunt Martha Marshall
- You Can't Take It with You (1938) – Meriam Kirby, Anthony's wife
- Three Loves Has Nancy (1938) – Mrs. Hansen
- Just Around the Corner (1938) – Miss Vincent (uncredited)
- You Can't Cheat an Honest Man (1939) – Mrs. Bel-Goodie
- Fast and Loose (1939) – Mrs. Torrent
- Risky Business (1939) – Mrs. Jameson
- The Ice Follies of 1939 (1939) – Lady Hilda (uncredited)
- Three Smart Girls Grow Up (1939) – Mrs. Withers (uncredited)
- Outside These Walls (1939) – Gertrude Bishop
- The Sun Never Sets (1939) – Mrs. Randolph
- It Could Happen to You (1939) – Mrs. Quigley (uncredited)
- Should Husbands Work? (1939) – Mrs. Barnes
- I Stole a Million (1939) – Customer in Flower Shop (uncredited)
- These Glamour Girls (1939) – Mrs. Van Reichton (uncredited)
- The Adventures of Sherlock Holmes (1939) – Lady Conyngham
- Hollywood Cavalcade (1939) – Mrs. Gaynes
- Ninotchka (1939) – Lady Lavenham – Indignant Woman in Doorway (uncredited)
- Laddie (1940) – Mrs. Anna Pryor
- Florian (1940) – Grandmother (uncredited)
- Blame It on Love (1940) – Mrs. Wadsworth
- Private Affairs (1940) – Mrs. Stanley
- All This, and Heaven Too (1940) – Lady at the Theatre (uncredited)
- Girl from Avenue A (1940) – Minor Role (uncredited)
- South of Suez (1940) – Mrs. Putnam
- Back Street (1941) – Mrs. Williams (uncredited)
- When Ladies Meet (1941) – Freddie's Mother (uncredited)
- Nothing But the Truth (1941) – Mrs. Ralston
- Paris Calling (1941) – Lady Guest (uncredited)
- We Were Dancing (1942) – Mrs. Louise Sandys (uncredited)
- Klondike Fury (1942) – Lady Leslie Clayfair
- Twin Beds (1942) – (uncredited)
- This Above All (1942) – Vicar's Wife (uncredited)
- Almost Married (1942) – Mrs. Marvin
- The Great Impersonation (1942) – Lady Leslie Clayfair
- Sherlock Holmes in Washington (1943) – Mother Pettibone (uncredited)
- Mr. Lucky (1943) – War Relief Worker (uncredited)
- Two Tickets to London (1943) – Dame Dunne Hartley
- Dangerous Blondes (1943) – Isabel Fleming (uncredited)
- Flesh and Fantasy (1943) – Lady Thomas (uncredited)
- Women in Bondage (1943) – Gladys Bracken
- Jane Eyre (1943) – Mrs. Eshton (uncredited)
- What a Woman! (1943) – Senator's Wife (uncredited)
- Tender Comrade (1943) – Mrs. Flanagan – Jo's Mother (uncredited)
- Ladies Courageous (1944) – Sister Rose (uncredited)
- The Picture of Dorian Gray (1945) – Lady Agatha
- A Guy, a Gal and a Pal (1945) – Mrs. Breckenridge (uncredited)
- I'll Remember April (1945) – Mrs. Barrington
- Earl Carroll Vanities (1945) – Queen Mother Elena
- That's the Spirit (1945) – Minor Role (uncredited)
- Guest Wife (1945) – Dinner Guest (uncredited)
- Lady on a Train (1945) – Waring Cousin (uncredited)
- That Night with You (1945) – Mrs. Brock (uncredited)
- One Way to Love (1946) – Distinguished Woman (uncredited)
- Terror by Night (1946) – Lady Margaret Carstairs
- The Kid from Brooklyn (1946) – Garden Party Guest (uncredited)
- A Stolen Life (1946) – Art Patron (uncredited)
- Half-Wits Holiday (1947 short) – Countess Shpritzvasser (uncredited)
- Cigarette Girl (1947) – Mrs. Halstead
- The Other Love (1947) – Madame Gruen – Sanitarium Patient (uncredited)
- Ivy (1947) – Lady Crail (uncredited)
- The Secret Life of Walter Mitty (1947) – Mrs. Pierce (uncredited)
- Down to Earth (1947) – Mrs. Fenimore Hume (uncredited)
- Song of Love (1947) – Woman at Party (uncredited)
- The Exile (1947) – Second Court Lady
- It Had to Be You (1947) – Mrs. Kimberly (uncredited)
- The Judge Steps Out (1948) – Margaret (uncredited)
- The Black Arrow (1948) – Nun (uncredited)
- You Gotta Stay Happy (1948) – Aunt Martha
- Pest Man Wins (1951 short) – Party Guest (uncredited)
- Les Misérables (1952) – Nun (uncredited)
- Alfred Hitchcock Presents (1955) (Season 1 Episode 5: "Into Thin Air" aka "The Vanishing Lady") – Mrs. Herbert Winthrop
- Houseboat (1958) – British Society Woman (uncredited)
