= The Auction Mart =

1920 British film by Duncan McRae

- Directed by: Duncan McRae
- Written by: Adrian Brunel; Sydney Tremaine (novel)
- Starring: Gertrude McCoy; Charles Quatermaine; Gerald Moore
- Production company: British Actors Film Company
- Distributed by: Phillips
- Release date: February 1920
- Country: United Kingdom
- Languages: Silent; English intertitles

The Auction Mart is a 1920 British silent drama film directed by Duncan McRae and starring Gertrude McCoy, Charles Quatermaine and Gerald Moore.

== Cast ==
- Gertrude McCoy as Jacqueline
- Charles Quatermaine as Jacqueline's Father
- Gerald Moore as Basil Stair
- Basil Foster as Carver
- Simeon Stuart as a Peer
- Moya Nugent
- Henry Doughty
- Minnie Rayner

== Bibliography ==
- Low, Rachael. History of the British Film, 1918-1929. George Allen & Unwin, 1971.
