= Cecil del Gue =

British actor

Cecil del Gue (also known as Cecil du Gué and Cecil du Gue) was a British actor of the silent era. In 1907, he lived in Streatham.

== Selected filmography ==
- The Green Terror (1919)
- Angel Esquire (1919)
- The Fordington Twins (1920)
- The Autumn of Pride (1921)
- Class and No Class (1921)
- Silent Evidence (1922)
- Three to One Against (1923)
- Women and Diamonds (1924)
- We Women (1925)
