= Leon Quartermaine =

British actor (1876–1967)

- Leon Quartermaine as Lt. Osborne in 1929 stage production of Journey's End
- Born: 24 September 1876; Richmond, London, UK
- Died: 25 June 1967 (aged 90)
- Occupation: British actor
- Relatives: Charles Quatermaine (brother)

Leon Quartermaine (24 September 1876 – 25 June 1967) was a British actor whose stage career, in Britain and the United States, extended from the early 1900s to the 1950s.

He was born in Richmond, London, and educated at the Whitgift School in Croydon, where one of his contemporaries was The Revd Harold Davidson, later unfrocked while Rector of Stiffkey. The pair acted together in a school production of the farce Sent to the Tower. In 1921 Quartermaine appeared with Fay Compton in a West End revival of J. M. Barrie's play Quality Street. In February 1922 Quartermaine and Compton married, and remained so until their divorce in 1942. Quartermaine made numerous appearances on Broadway between 1903 and 1935, including Laertes (Hamlet, 1904), Lieutenant Osborne in the American premiere of R. C. Sherriff's Journey's End (1929), and Malvolio (Twelfth Night, 1930). Quartermaine appeared in several films during the 1920s and 1930s, including As You Like It (1936) in which he co-starred as Jaques to Laurence Olivier's Orlando. After the Second World War, Quartermaine joined the Royal Shakespeare Theatre for the 1949 and 1950 Stratford festivals, in a company including John Gielgud, Peggy Ashcroft, Anthony Quayle and other leading Shakespearean actors, in Macbeth, Measure for Measure and Much Ado About Nothing. In 1951 he played the part of the Inquisitor in a BBC television adaptation of Shaw's Saint Joan.

Quatermaine had first been married to Aimée de Burgh. After their divorce, and after his later marriage with Fay Compton was dissolved, he married Barbara Wilcox, who had appeared in The Cherry Orchard as Dunyasha at the Old Vic in 1933 when he appeared as Gaev.

Quartermaine died on 25 June 1967, in Salisbury, Wiltshire. His younger brother Charles Quartermaine (who adopted the surname spelling "Quatermaine") was also an actor.
