= Nets of Destiny =

1924 film

- Directed by: Arthur Rooke
- Written by: Eliot Stannard
- Based on: The Salving of a Derelict by Maurice Drake
- Produced by: I.B. Davidson
- Starring: Stewart Rome; Mary Odette; Gertrude McCoy
- Production company: I.B. Davidson
- Distributed by: Butcher's Film Service
- Release date: November 1924
- Running time: 60 minutes
- Country: United Kingdom
- Languages: Silent; English intertitles

Nets of Destiny is a 1924 British drama film directed by Arthur Rooke and starring Stewart Rome, Mary Odette and Gertrude McCoy. It was an adaptation of the novel The Salving of a Derelict by Maurice Drake. The screenplay concerns a son, who tries to overturn the disgrace of his father, who committed suicide.

== Cast ==
- Stewart Rome as Lawrence Averil
- Mary Odette as Marion Graham
- Gertrude McCoy as Constancae
- Cameron Carr as Reingold
- Judd Green as Captain Menzies
- Reginald Fox as Pat Dwyer
- Benson Kleve as Jack Menzies
- James English as Major Graham
- George Turner as Jerry Fisher
- Laura Walker as Mrs. Jardine

== Bibliography ==
- Low, Rachael. The History of British Film, Volume 4 1918-1929. Routledge, 1997.
