= Cyril Smith (actor) =

Scottish actor (1892–1963)

- Born: 4 April 1892; Peterhead, Aberdeenshire, Scotland
- Died: 5 March 1963 (aged 70); London, England
- Occupation: Actor
- Years active: 1900–1962

Cyril Edward Bruce-Smith (4 April 1892 – 5 March 1963) was a Scottish actor who began his career as a child in 1900 and went on to appear in numerous stage plays as well as over 100 films between 1914 and his death almost 50 years later. The son of Frederick and Elsa Smith; his mother travelled with him on his engagements during his boyhood.

== Career ==
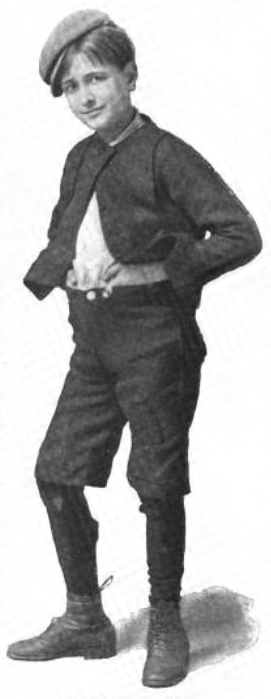
In The Adoption of Archibald, 1903

Smith first became known as a child stage actor in 1900, and by the age of 13 in 1905, he travelled to New York to appear as Cosmo in a production of the J. M. Barrie play Alice-Sit-By-The Fire, opposite Ethel Barrymore; at the time, The New York Times hailed him as "one of the best-known child actors in England". Smith's film career began in 1914 in the Wilfred Noy-directed Old St. Paul's and he appeared in almost 20 other silent films of the 1910s and 1920s before making the transition to sound. From the early 1930s until his death, he featured in dozens of films ranging from the quota quickies of the 1930s and the B-movies of the 1940s and 1950s, through to more prestigious productions starring names such as Vivien Leigh, Trevor Howard and Deborah Kerr. Smith was not a name-billed film actor, and many of his roles were uncredited bit parts or minor roles with generic titles such as "Publican", "Reporter" or "Bailiff"; however towards the end of his life he achieved several more prominent billings after finding a late-career niche portraying scatty and doddery elderly men. For instance, in 1956, he had a leading role in the Peggy Mount comedy, Sailor Beware! and a similar leading role in the Hylda Baker comedy, She Knows Y'Know (1962) . Smith also moved into television, as Merlin the magician in the 1956 ITV series The Adventures of Sir Lancelot which was also a success in the U.S. and as Harold Wormold in the first series of the BBC sitcom Hugh and I in 1962.

Smith suffered a heart attack in December 1962 and died on 5 March 1963, aged 70.

== Filmography ==
- Old St. Paul's (1914) - Boy (film debut)
- Pallard the Punter (1919) - Horace Callender
- Walls of Prejudice (1920) - Karpat
- The Fordington Twins (1920) - Cyril Raleigh
- Class and No Class (1921) - Lord Daventry
- Fires of Fate (1923) - Lord Howard Cecil
- The Desert Sheik (1924)
- The Innocents of Chicago (1932) - Gangster
- The Mayor's Nest (1932) - Magistrate
- The Man from Toronto (1933) - Gossiping Villager (uncredited)
- The Good Companions (1933) - Leonard Oakroyd
- Channel Crossing (1933) - Beach
- Friday the Thirteenth (1933) - Fred the Driver
- The Roof (1933) - McNair
- The Black Abbot (1934) - Alf Higgins
- Waltzes from Vienna (1934) - Secretary (uncredited)
- It's a Cop (1934) - Lewis
- Evergreen (1934) - Stage Manager (uncredited)
- Wild Boy (1934) - Kennel Boy
- Oh, Daddy! (1935) - Alfred the Butler (uncredited)
- Key to Harmony (1935) - Fred
- Hello, Sweetheart (1935) - Mac McGuire
- Me and Marlborough (1935) - Corporal Fox
- Bulldog Jack (1935) - Duke (uncredited)
- Lend Me Your Wife (1935) - Charles Harwood
- Brown on Resolution (1935) - William Brown, Jr.
- The Tunnel (1935) - Casualty Announcer (uncredited)
- Music Hath Charms (1935) - BBC Producer (uncredited)
- Pot Luck (1936) - Miller
- The Last Journey (1936) - Postal Sorter (uncredited)
- Jack of All Trades (1936) - (uncredited)
- O.H.M.S. (1937) - Steward (uncredited)
- Dark Journey (1937) - Baron von Marwitz's Valet (uncredited)
- The Frog (1937) - PC Balder
- Storm in a Teacup (1937) - Councillor
- The Challenge (1938) - Customs Officer
- No Parking (1938) - Stanley
- Sidewalks of London (1938) - Black Face
- The Return of the Frog (1938) - Maggs
- Sword of Honour (1939) - Bright
- Traitor Spy (1939) - Det. Sgt. Trotter
- The Flying Squad (1940) - Tiser
- They Flew Alone (1942) - Radio Operator On 'Aquitania'
- We'll Smile Again (1942) - Assistant Cutter (uncredited)
- When We Are Married (1943) - Fred Dyson
- Fanny by Gaslight (1944) - Publican (uncredited)
- One Exciting Night (1944) - Joe
- Meet Sexton Blake! (1945) - Belford
- On Stage Everybody (1945) - Talent Show Winner
- Don Chicago (1945) - Flash Kelly
- The Agitator (1945) - Dunham
- Murder in Reverse (1945) - Customer
- The Echo Murders (1945) - P.C. Smith
- This Man Is Mine (1946) - Taxi Driver (uncredited)
- Appointment with Crime (1946) - Det. Sgt. Charlie Weeks
- School for Secrets (1946) - Flight Sgt. Cox
- They Made Me a Fugitive (1947) - Bert
- So Well Remembered (1947) - 2nd Publican (uncredited)
- If Winter Comes (1947) - Truck Driver (uncredited)
- Daughter of Darkness (1948) - Joe
- Escape (1948) - Policeman (uncredited)
- One Night with You (1948) - Second Ticket Collector
- Romance on the High Seas (1948) - English Bartender (uncredited)
- No Room at the Inn (1948) - Store Detective (uncredited)
- It's Hard to Be Good (1948) - Fred Hobson
- Hills of Home (1948) - Signor Rimini (uncredited)
- The History of Mr. Polly (1949) - Mr. Voules
- Conspirator (1949) - Detective Inspector
- The Interrupted Journey (1949) - Publican
- The Rocking Horse Winner (1949) - Bailiff
- The Body Said No! (1950) - Sergeant
- Old Mother Riley Headmistress (1950) - Maltby
- The Third Visitor (1951) - Detective Horton
- The Dark Man (1951) - Samuel Denny
- No Highway in the Sky (1951) - Airport Officer (uncredited)
- Mystery Junction (1951) - Station Master
- Green Grow the Rushes (1951) - Hubert Hewitt
- Night Was Our Friend (1951) - Rogers the Reporter
- Judgment Deferred (1952) - (uncredited)
- Stolen Face (1952) - Alf Bixby, Innkeeper
- Mother Riley Meets the Vampire (1952) - Mr. Paine, the rent collector
- The Lost Hours (1952) - Det. Sgt. Roper
- Women of Twilight (1952) - Flinton (uncredited)
- Hindle Wakes (1952) - Hotel Porter
- The Steel Key (1953) - Boat Owner (uncredited)
- Wheel of Fate (1953) - Perce
- The Angel Who Pawned Her Harp (1954) - Dog Owner
- Svengali (1954) - 1st Stage Manager
- Burnt Evidence (1954) - Alf Quinney
- The Brain Machine (1955) - Prison Warder
- John and Julie (1955) - Ticket Inspector
- Value for Money (1955) - Writ Server (uncredited)
- Who Done It? (1956) - Refrigeration Plant Worker (uncredited)
- Sailor Beware! (1956) - Henry Hornett
- The Adventures of Sir Lancelot (1956-1957, TV Series) - Merlin
- The Rough and the Smooth (1959) - Taxi Driver
- Light Up the Sky! (1960) - 'Spinner' Rice
- Watch It, Sailor! (1961) - Henry Hornett
- On the Fiddle (1961) - Ticket Collector
- Over the Odds (1961) - Sam
- She Knows Y'Know (1962) - Joe Worswick (final film)
