= Afterglow (1923 film) =

1923 British film by G. B. Samuelson and Walter Summers

- Directed by: Walter Summers; G. B. Samuelson
- Written by: Walter Summers
- Produced by: G. B. Samuelson
- Starring: Lillian Hall-Davis; Fred Hearne; James Lindsay
- Production company: Napoleon Films
- Distributed by: Napoleon Films
- Release date: September 1923
- Country: United Kingdom
- Languages: Silent; English intertitles

Afterglow is a 1923 British silent drama film directed by G. B. Samuelson and Walter Summers and starring Lillian Hall-Davis, Fred Hearne and James Lindsay. It was made at Isleworth Studios.

== Cast ==
- Lillian Hall-Davis as Ethel
- Fred Hearne as Bayard Delavel
- James Lindsay as Howard Massingham
- Minna Grey as Grace Andover
- Annette Benson as Myra Massingham
- Simeon Stuart as Judge Maitland
- Walter McEwen as Bob Farley
- Caleb Porter

== Bibliography ==
- Harris, Ed. Britain's Forgotten Film Factory: The Story of Isleworth Studios. Amberley Publishing, 2013.
