= Doris Lloyd =

British actress (1891–1968)

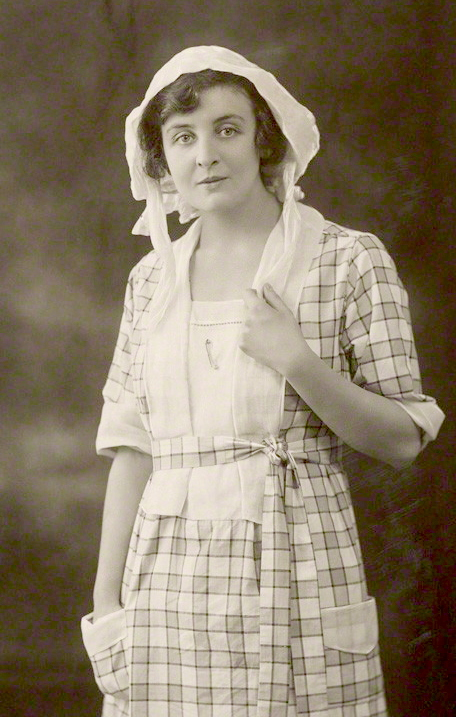
- Lloyd in 1921
- Born: Hessy Doris Lloyd; 3 July 1891; Toxteth Park, Liverpool, England
- Died: 21 May 1968 (aged 76); Santa Barbara, California, U.S.
- Resting place: Forest Lawn Memorial Park
- Occupation: Actress
- Years active: 1916–1967

Hessy Doris Lloyd (3 July 1891 – 21 May 1968) was a British actress. She appeared in The Time Machine (1960) and The Sound of Music (1965).

== Early life ==
Lloyd's parents were church orgain builder Edward Franklin Lloyd and Hessy Jane McCappin. She was born in Liverpool, and she had a grandfather who was an amateur actor. Her father was born in 1855 in Holywell, Flintshire, Wales. Her mother was born in 1860. Actor George K. Arthur was her brother-in-law.

== Career ==
Lloyd began acting professionally when she was 16 years old, beginning with a four-week trial with a repertory company in Liverpool. She remained with the company for five years, and by age 21 she acted in nearly every role possible. When she was 23, she debuted on stage with the Liverpool Repertory Company. She appeared a number of times in the London West End, including in Mr. Todd's Experiment by Walter Hackett (Queen's Theatre, 1920), and The Smiths of Surbiton by Keble Howard (New Theatre, 1922). Her film debut was in the 1920 British silent film The Shadow Between.

In 1924 she went to the United States to visit a sister already living there. What was supposed to be a visit she made permanent. She spent several years (1916–25) appearing in Broadway theatre plays, notably a number of Ziegfeld Follies editions, and probably spent some time on the road in touring companies. She decided on a film career, making her first US film in 1925. With the exception of returning to one Broadway play in 1947, her career was devoted to films and television.

== Roles ==
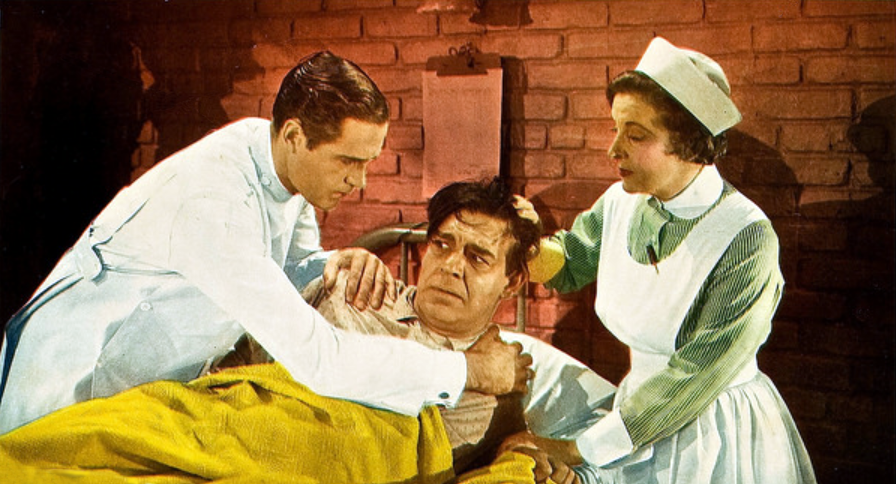
Patric Knowles, Lon Chaney Jr. and Doris Lloyd in Frankenstein Meets the Wolf Man (1943)

Lloyd appeared in more than 150 films in a 42-year career between 1925 and 1967, including the 1933 low-budget Monogram Pictures version of Oliver Twist, in which she played Nancy. Irving Pichel starred as Fagin and Dickie Moore as Oliver. Her roles ranged from the sinister Russian spy Mrs. Travers in the biopic Disraeli (1929) to the meek housekeeper Mrs. Watchett in The Time Machine (1960).

Her most famous film roles were in the Tarzan films starring Johnny Weissmuller. She portrayed a nurse in Frankenstein Meets the Wolf Man (1943) with Lon Chaney Jr. as the Wolf Man and Bela Lugosi as Frankenstein's monster. She voiced one of the roses in Disney's Alice in Wonderland (1951), later making brief but memorable appearances in Mary Poppins and The Sound of Music, which both starred Julie Andrews.

== Death ==
Lloyd died on 21 May 1968, aged 76, in Santa Barbara, California. She is interred in Glendale's Forest Lawn Memorial Park Cemetery.

== Selected filmography ==
- The Shadow Between (1920) as Marian West
- Love's Influence (1922)
- The Lady (1925) as Fannie Chair
- The Man from Red Gulch (1925) as Madame Le Blanc
- The Blackbird (1926) as Limehouse Polly
- Brown of Harvard (1926) as Nurse (uncredited)
- Black Paradise (1926) as Lillian Webster
- The Midnight Kiss (1926) as Ellen Atkins
- Exit Smiling (1926) as Olga
- The Auctioneer (1927) as Esther Levi
- The Broncho Twister (1927) as Teresa Brady
- Is Zat So? (1927) as Sue Parker
- Rich But Honest (1927) as Mrs. O'Grady
- Lonesome Ladies (1927) as Helen Wayne
- Two Girls Wanted (1927) as Mrs. Timoney
- Come to My House (1927) as Renee Parsons
- The Trail of '98 (1928) as Locasto's Procurer
- The Drake Case (1929) as Mrs. Drake
- The Careless Age (1929) as Mabs
- Disraeli (1929) as Mrs. Travers
- Sarah and Son (1930) as Mrs. Ashmore, Vanning's sister
- Our Blushing Brides (1930) as Miss Hartley, head of the lingerie department (uncredited)
- Old English (1930) as Mrs. Rosamond Lane
- Reno (1930) as Lola Fealey
- Way for a Sailor (1930) as Flossy
- Charley's Aunt (1930) as Donna Lucia D'Alvadorez
- The Bachelor Father (1931) as Mrs. Julia Webb
- Transgression (1931) as Paula Vrain
- Bought! (1931) as Mrs. Barry
- Waterloo Bridge (1931) as Kitty
- Devotion (1931) as Pansy
- Once a Lady (1931) as Lady Ellen Somerville
- Tarzan the Ape Man (1932) as Mrs. Cutten
- The Washington Masquerade (1932) as Dinner Guest (uncredited)
- Back Street (1932) as Corinne Saxel, Walter's wife
- Payment Deferred (1932) as Woman exchanging foreign currency in bank (uncredited)
- A Farewell to Arms (1932) as Nurse (uncredited)
- Robbers' Roost (1932) as Prossie (uncredited)
- Oliver Twist (1933) as Nancy Sikes
- Secrets (1933) as Susan Channing
- Looking Forward (1933) as Mrs. Lil Benton
- A Study in Scarlet (1933) as Mrs. Murphy
- Peg o' My Heart (1933) as Mrs. Grace Brent
- Voltaire (1933) as Madame Clarion, actress
- Long Lost Father (1934) as Mrs. Bellwater, the blonde widow
- Glamour (1934) as Nana
- Sisters Under the Skin (1934) as Elinor Yates
- Madame Du Barry (1934) as Madame of Dear Park (uncredited)
- Kiss and Make-Up (1934) as Madame Durand
- She Was a Lady (1934) as Alice Vane
- One Exciting Adventure (1934) as Customer
- British Agent (1934) as Lady Carrister
- Dangerous Corner (1934) as Maude Mockridge
- Strange Wives (1934) as Mrs. Sleeper
- The Man Who Reclaimed His Head (1934) as Lulu, woman in theatre box (uncredited)
- Clive of India (1935) as Mrs. Nixon
- A Shot in the Dark (1935) as Lucille Coates
- The Woman in Red (1935) as Mrs. Casserly
- Straight from the Heart (1935) as Miss Carter
- Chasing Yesterday (1935) as Madame De Gabry (uncredited)
- Motive for Revenge (1935) as Mrs. Fleming
- Becky Sharp (1935) as Duchess of Richmond
- Two for Tonight (1935) as Lady Ralston (uncredited)
- A Feather in Her Hat (1935) as Liz Vining
- Peter Ibbetson (1935) as Mrs. Dorian
- Mutiny on the Bounty (1935) as Cockney Moll (uncredited)
- The Perfect Gentleman (1935) as Kate
- Kind Lady (1935) as Lucy Weston
- Don't Get Personal (1936) as Mrs. Charles van Ronesoleer
- Follow the Fleet (1936) as Mrs. Courtney (uncredited)
- Too Many Parents (1936) as Mrs. Downing
- Brilliant Marriage (1936) as Mrs. Madeleine Allison
- Mary of Scotland (1936) as Fisherman's Wife
- The Luckiest Girl in the World (1936) (uncredited)
- A Woman Rebels (1936) as Mrs. Seaton, Party Guest (uncredited)
- The Plough and the Stars (1936) as Woman at barricades
- Bulldog Drummond Escapes (1937) as Nurse
- The Soldier and the Lady (1937) as Shepherdess (uncredited)
- Alcatrez Island (1937) as Miss Marquand
- Tovarich (1937) as Madame Chauffourier-Dubleff
- Murder Is News (1937) as Pauline Drake
- The Black Doll (1938) as Laura Leland
- The Baroness and the Butler (1938) as Lady at charity party (uncredited)
- Lord Jeff (1938) as Party Hostess (uncredited)
- Port of Seven Seas (1938) as Customer (uncredited)
- Letter of Introduction (1938) as Charlotte in play (uncredited)
- They Made Me a Criminal (1939) as Mrs. Williamson (uncredited)
- Three Smart Girls Grow Up (1939) as Guest (uncredited)
- I'm from Missouri (1939) as Mrs. Arthur, Duchess of Cricklewood
- The Spellbinder (1939) as Mrs. Raymond, School Headmistress (uncredited)
- Chicken Wagon Family (1939) as Mrs. McGinty (uncredited)
- The Old Maid (1939) as Miss Ford (uncredited)
- The Under-Pup (1939) as Mrs. Binns
- The Private Lives of Elizabeth and Essex (1939) as Handmaiden (uncredited)
- Intermezzo (1939) as Schoolteacher at accident scene (uncredited)
- First Love (1939) as Mrs. Parker
- We Are Not Alone (1939) as Mrs. Jaeggers (uncredited)
- Barricade (1939) as Mrs. Ward
- Vigil in the Night (1940) as Mrs. Martha Bowley
- 'Til We Meet Again (1940) as Louise
- The Boys from Syracuse (1940) as Woman
- Life with Henry (1940) as Mrs. Anderson (uncredited)
- The Letter (1940) as Mrs. Cooper
- Lady with Red Hair (1940) as Teacher at Miss Humbert's school (uncredited)
- The Great Plane Robbery (1940) as Mrs. Jamison
- Scotland Yard (1941) as Miss Harcourt, nurse (uncredited)
- The Great Lie (1941) as Bertha, Sandra's maid (uncredited)
- Shining Victory (1941) as Mrs. Foster
- Dr. Jekyll and Mr. Hyde (1941) as Mrs. Marley (uncredited)
- International Squadron (1941) as Mother (uncredited)
- Appointment for Love (1941) as Woman Spectator (uncredited)
- Keep 'Em Flying (1941) as Lady with lipstick (uncredited)
- The Wolf Man (1941) as Mrs. Williams (uncredited)
- On the Sunny Side (1942) as Mrs. Whitaker (uncredited)
- The Ghost of Frankenstein (1942) as Martha
- This Above All (1942) as WAAF Sergeant (uncredited)
- Night Monster (1942) as Sarah Judd
- Journey for Margaret (1942) as Mrs. Barrie
- Forever and a Day (1943) as Trimble Maid
- No Place for a Lady (1943) as Evelyn Harris
- Frankenstein Meets the Wolf Man (1943) as Dr. Mannering's Nurse (uncredited)
- Mission to Moscow (1943) as Mrs. Churchill (uncredited)
- Two Tickets to London (1943) as Emmie (uncredited)
- The Constant Nymph (1943) as Miss Hamilton
- Flesh and Fantasy (1943) as Mrs. Carrington (uncredited)
- What a Woman! (1943) as Drama Coach (uncredited)
- The Lodger (1944) as Jennie
- Phantom Lady (1944) as Kettisha
- Follow the Boys (1944) as Nurse (uncredited)
- The White Cliffs of Dover (1944) as Plump Lady at boardinghouse (uncredited)
- The Invisible Man's Revenge (1944) as Maud
- Frenchman's Creek (1944)
- The Conspirators (1944) as Mrs. Benson (uncredited)
- The House of Fear (1945) as Bessie (uncredited)
- Molly and Me (1945) as Mrs. Graham
- Scotland Yard Investigator (1945) as Emma Todworthy
- Kitty (1945) as Fishhawker (uncredited)
- My Name Is Julia Ross (1945) as Mrs. Mackie
- Allotment Wives (1945) as Alice Van Brook
- Three Strangers (1946) as Mrs. Proctor
- Tarzan and the Leopard Woman (1946) as Miss Wetherby, School Superintendent (uncredited)
- To Each His Own (1946) as Miss Pringle
- Devotion (1946) as Mrs. Ingraham (uncredited)
- Of Human Bondage (1946) as Landlady
- G.I. War Brides (1946) as Beatrice Moraski
- Holiday in Mexico (1946) as Cady Millicent Owen (uncredited)
- Sister Kenny (1946) as Matron (uncredited)
- The Imperfect Lady (1947) as Woman in theater balcony (uncredited)
- The Secret Life of Walter Mitty (1947) as Mrs. Leticia Follinebee
- Escape Me Never (1947) as Mrs. Cooper (uncredited)
- The Sign of the Ram (1948) as Mrs. Woolton (uncredited)
- The Red Danube (1949) as Mrs. Omicron (uncredited)
- Challenge to Lassie (1949) as Landlady (uncredited)
- Adam's Rib (1949) as Lady with Attinger kids in court (uncredited)
- Tyrant of the Sea (1950) as Elizabeth Blake
- Kind Lady (1951) as Rose
- Alice in Wonderland (1951) as Rose (voice)
- The Son of Dr. Jekyll (1951) as Lottie Sorelle (uncredited)
- The Prisoner of Zenda (1952) as Lady Topham (uncredited)
- Young Bess (1953) as Mother Jack
- The Black Shield of Falworth (1954) as Dame Ellen
- A Man Called Peter (1955) as Miss Hopkins (uncredited)
- Interrupted Melody (1955) as Volunteer Worker (uncredited)
- The Swan (1956) as Countess Sibenstoyn
- Jeanne Eagels (1957) as Mrs. Corliss (uncredited)
- Alfred Hitchcock Presents (1958) (Season 3 Episode 35: "Dip in the Pool") as Emily's Mother
- Alfred Hitchcock Presents (1958) (Season 3 Episode 38: "The Impromptu Murder") as Miss Wilkinson
- Alfred Hitchcock Presents (1958) (Season 4 Episode 8: "Safety for the Witness") as Mrs. Jefferson Crawpit, the Gun Store Customer
- Alfred Hitchcock Presents (1960) (Season 5 Episode 35: "The Schartz-Metterklume Method") as Nannie
- The Time Machine (1960) as Mrs. Watchett
- Midnight Lace (1960) as Nora Stanley, the Housekeeper
- The Notorious Landlady as Lady Fallott
- Thriller (1960) as Edith Pringle
- Alfred Hitchcock Presents (1962) (Season 7 Episode 13: "Silk Petticoat") as Mrs. Boyd
- The Alfred Hitchcock Hour (1963) (Season 1 Episode 29: "The Dark Pool") as Andrina Gibbs
- The Alfred Hitchcock Hour (1964) (Season 2 Episode 31: "Isabel") as Martha
- Mary Poppins (1964) as Depositor (uncredited)
- The Alfred Hitchcock Hour (1965) (Season 3 Episode 16: "One of the Family") as Callendars' Maid
- The Alfred Hitchcock Hour (1965) (Season 3 Episode 22: "Thou Still Unravished Bride") as Mother
- The Sound of Music (1965) as Baroness Ebberfeld
- Rosie! (1967) as Sedalia
