= Silent Evidence =

1922 film

- Directed by: E. H. Calvert
- Written by: Alice Ramsey
- Starring: David Hawthorne; Marjorie Hume; Frank Dane
- Production company: Gaumont British Picture Corporation
- Release date: November 1922
- Country: United Kingdom
- Languages: Silent; English intertitles

Silent Evidence is a 1922 British silent mystery film directed by E. H. Calvert and starring David Hawthorne, Marjorie Hume and Frank Dane.

== Cast ==
- David Hawthorne as Mark Stanton
- Marjorie Hume as Rosamund
- Frank Dane as Raoul de Merincourt
- H. R. Hignett as Charles
- Cecil del Gue as Dr. Hickson
- Winifred Nelson as Fiancée

== Bibliography ==
- Low, Rachael. History of the British Film, 1918-1929. George Allen & Unwin, 1971.
