= Angel Esquire (novel) =

1908 crime mystery novel

- Author: Edgar Wallace
- Language: English
- Genre: Crime
- Publication date: 1908
- Publication place: United Kingdom
- Media type: Print

Angel Esquire is a 1908 crime mystery novel by the British writer Edgar Wallace. The wealthy owner of a gambling establishment leaves his money to whichever of his potential heirs can solve a complex puzzle. The title comes from the Scotland Yard detective Christopher Angel, who becomes involved with the case.

== Film Adaptations ==
- A 1919 British silent film Angel Esquire directed by William Kellino
- A 1964 West German film The Curse of the Hidden Vault directed by Franz Josef Gottlieb, part of a long-running series of Wallace adaptations

== Bibliography ==
- Clark, Neil. Stranger than Fiction: The Life of Edgar Wallace, the Man Who Created King Kong. Stroud, UK: The History Press, 2015.
- Goble, Alan. The Complete Index to Literary Sources in Film. Walter de Gruyter, 1999.
