= The Unwanted (1924 film) =

1924 film directed by Walter Summers

- Directed by: Walter Summers
- Written by: Walter Summers
- Produced by: G.B. Samuelson
- Starring: C. Aubrey Smith; Lillian Hall-Davis; Nora Swinburne
- Production company: Napoleon Films
- Distributed by: Napoleon Films
- Release date: April 1924
- Country: United Kingdom
- Languages: Silent; English intertitles

The Unwanted is a 1924 British silent drama film directed by Walter Summers and starring C. Aubrey Smith, Lillian Hall-Davis and Nora Swinburne.

== Cast ==
- C. Aubrey Smith as Colonel Carrington
- Lillian Hall-Davis as Maraine Dearsley
- Nora Swinburne as Joyce Mannering
- Francis Lister as John Dearsley
- Walter Sondes as Kenneth Carrington
- Mary Dibley as Genevieve

== Bibliography ==
- Harris, Ed. Britain's Forgotten Film Factory: The Story of Isleworth Studios. Amberley Publishing, 2013.
