= The Lady Clare (1919 film) =

1919 film

The Lady Clare is a 1919 British silent drama film directed by Wilfred Noy and starring Mary Odette, Jack Hobbs and Charles Quatermaine. It is based on the narrative poem Lady Clare by Lord Tennyson.

== Cast ==
- Mary Odette - Lady Clare
- Jack Hobbs - Lord Ronald Medwin
- Charles Quatermaine - Marquis of Hartlepool
- Simeon Stuart - Earl of Robhurst
- Gladys Jennings - Ann Sheldrake
- Mary Forbes - Lady Julia Medwin
- Barbara Everest - Alice
- Fewlass Llewellyn - Doctor Jenner
- Arthur Cleave - Charles Boulton
- Gilbert Esmond - Duke
- Winifred Evans - Clare Hampden
- Nancy O'Hara - Ursula Hampden
