= The Most Precious Thing in Life =

1934 film by Lambert Hillyer

- Theatrical release poster
- Directed by: Lambert Hillyer; Robert Margolis
- Written by: Ethel Hill; Dore Schary; Travis Ingham
- Produced by: Robert North
- Starring: Richard Cromwell; Jean Arthur; Donald Cook; Anita Louise; Mary Forbes
- Cinematography: John Stumar
- Edited by: Richard Cahoon
- Production company: Columbia Pictures
- Distributed by: Columbia Pictures
- Release date: June 5, 1934 (United States)
- Running time: 67 minutes
- Country: United States
- Language: English

The Most Precious Thing in Life is a 1934 American pre-Code film directed by Lambert Hillyer and starring Richard Cromwell, Jean Arthur, Donald Cook, Anita Louise, and Mary Forbes.

The film tells a story about secret and selfless maternal devotion with elements of Madame X (1929) and Stella Dallas (1937). It is Jean Arthur's third film with Columbia.

== Plot ==
Ellen Holmes, a girl from an ordinary family, marries a rich, yet spoiled, boy from a snobbish family. The pair has a son, but soon Ellen finds herself ousted from the life of her husband. However, she rediscovers her son years later.

== Cast ==
- Richard Cromwell as Chris Kelsey
- Jean Arthur as Ellen Holmes, also known as Biddy and Babe
- Donald Cook as Bob Kelsey
- Anita Louise as Patty O'Day
- Mary Forbes as Mrs. Kelsey
- Jane Darwell as Mrs. O'Day
- Ben Alexander as Gubby Gerhart
- John Wray as Carter [Head janitor]
- Ward Bond as Head coach
- Dutch Hendrian as Assistant coach
- Paul Stanton as Mr. Kelsey
- Greta Meyer as Mrs. Svenson
- Samuel S. Hinds as Dean
- Maidel Turner as Dean's wife
