= Love's Influence =

1922 film

- Directed by: William S. Charlton; Edward Gordon
- Produced by: George K. Arthur
- Starring: George K. Arthur; Flora le Breton; Simeon Stuart
- Production company: Star Producstion
- Distributed by: Unity Film Company
- Release date: December 1922
- Country: United Kingdom
- Languages: Silent; English intertitles

Love's Influence is a 1922 British silent drama film directed by William S. Charlton and Edward Gordon and starring George K. Arthur, Flora le Breton and Simeon Stuart.

== Cast ==
- George K. Arthur as Johnny O'Hara
- Flora le Breton as June
- Simeon Stuart
- Bertie White
- George Turner
- Doris Lloyd
- William Lugg
- Marie Gerald

== Bibliography ==
- Denis Gifford. The Illustrated Who's Who in British Films. B.T. Batsford, 1978.
