= Saved from the Sea =

1920 film

- Directed by: W. P. Kellino
- Written by: Ben Landeck (play); Arthur Shirley (play); W.P. Kellino
- Starring: Nora Swinburne; Philip Anthony; Wallace Bosco; Terence Cavanagh
- Production company: Gaumont British Picture Corporation
- Distributed by: Gaumont British Distributors
- Release date: October 1920
- Running time: 6,000 feet
- Country: United Kingdom
- Languages: Silent; English intertitles

Saved from the Sea is a 1920 British silent crime film directed by W. P. Kellino and starring Nora Swinburne, Philip Anthony and Wallace Bosco. It was based on a play by Ben Landeck and Arthur Shirley. It was made by Kellino for Gaumont British under the 'Westminster Films' brand.

== Premise ==
In Cornwall a cardsharper and his heir frame a fisherman for the death of their jealous partner.

== Cast ==
- Nora Swinburne as Nancy Brooks
- Philip Anthony as Dan Ellington
- Wallace Bosco as Peter Scalcher
- Terence Cavanagh as Dick Fenton
- Mary Saville as Mrs. Ellington
- Cecil Calvert

== Bibliography ==
- Low, Rachael. History of the British Film, 1918–1929. George Allen & Unwin, 1971.
