= Creation (1922 film) =

1922 British film by Humberston Wright

- Directed by: Humberston Wright
- Based on: The Man Who Dared (novel) by May Edginton
- Starring: Dorothy Fane; Frank Dane; Simeon Stuart
- Production company: Raleigh King Films
- Release date: August 1922
- Country: United Kingdom
- Languages: Silent; English intertitles

Creation is a 1922 British silent drama film directed by Humberston Wright and starring Dorothy Fane, Frank Dane and Simeon Stuart. It is based on the novel The Man Who Dared by May Edginton.

== Cast ==
- Dorothy Fane as Zena Hammond
- Frank Dane as Faux Evermore
- Simeon Stuart as Dr. Ganally
- William Freshman
- Kate Gurney
- Raleigh King
- Thelma Murray
- Beryl Norton

== Bibliography ==
- Goble, Alan. The Complete Index to Literary Sources in Film. Walter de Gruyter, 1999.
