= Walls of Prejudice =

1920 film

- Directed by: Charles Calvert
- Starring: Josephine Earle; Dallas Anderson and Humberston Wright
- Release date: 1920
- Country: United Kingdom
- Language: Silent

Walls of Prejudice is a 1920 British silent drama film directed by Charles Calvert and starring Josephine Earle, Dallas Anderson and Humberston Wright. It was based on a play by Alexander Grossman.

== Cast ==
- Josephine Earle as Margaret Benson
- Dallas Anderson as Patrick Benson
- Humberston Wright as Bigton
- Zoe Palmer as Madge Benson
- Cyril Smith as Karpat

== Bibliography ==
- Bamford, Kenton. Distorted Images: British National Identity and Film in the 1920s. I.B. Tauris, 1999.
