= The Temptation of Carlton Earle =

1923 film

- Directed by: Wilfred Noy
- Written by: Stella M. During (novel); S.H. Herkomer
- Starring: C. Aubrey Smith; James Lindsay; Gertrude McCoy; Simeon Stuart
- Production company: British Actors Film Company
- Distributed by: British Actors Film Company
- Release date: March 1923
- Country: United Kingdom
- Languages: Silent; English intertitles

The Temptation of Carlton Earle is a 1923 British silent crime film directed by Wilfred Noy and starring C. Aubrey Smith, James Lindsay and Gertrude McCoy.

== Cast ==
- C. Aubrey Smith as Carlton Earle
- James Lindsay as Royston
- Gertrude McCoy as Margaret Roynton
- Simeon Stuart as Whitworth
- Francis Innys as Pap
- Lilian Gould as Jenny Taylor
- Beatrice Trouville as Sylvia Conyers
- Charles Poulton as Dr. Carr

== Bibliography ==
- Low, Rachael. The History of the British Film 1918-1929. George Allen & Unwin, 1971.
