= Dallas Anderson =

Scottish actress (1874–1934)

Dallas Anderson (12 July 1874, in Crieff, Scotland, UK – 16 November 1934, Richmond, Virginia, USA) was a Scottish stage and film actor, whose credits include 22 appearances on Broadway.

== Selected filmography ==
- The Fordington Twins (1920)
- The Fall of a Saint (1920)
- The Edge of Youth (1920)
- Walls of Prejudice (1920)
- Branded (1920)
