= Three to One Against =

1923 film

- Directed by: George A. Cooper
- Starring: Florence Wood; Cecil del Gue; Judd Green
- Production company: Quality Plays
- Distributed by: Gaumont British Distributors
- Release date: December 1922
- Country: United Kingdom
- Languages: Silent; English intertitles

Three to One Against is a 1923 British silent comedy film directed by George A. Cooper and starring Florence Wood, Cecil del Gue and Judd Green.

== Cast ==
- Florence Wood as Mrs. Musquash
- Cecil del Gue as Soldier
- Judd Green as Sailor
- Gibb McLaughlin as Cleric

== Bibliography ==
- Murphy, Robert. Directors in British and Irish Cinema: A Reference Companion. British Film Institute, 2006.
