= Education of a Prince =

1927 film

Éducation de Prince
- Directed by: Henri Diamant-Berger
- Written by: Henri Diamant-Berger; André de Lorde
- Based on: Education of a Prince by Maurice Donnay
- Produced by: Bernard Natan
- Starring: Pierre Batcheff; Flora le Breton
- Cinematography: René Guissart
- Music by: Michel-Maurice Lévy
- Production company: Films Bernard Natan
- Distributed by: Etablissements Louis Aubert; Wardour Films (UK)
- Release date: 15 August 1927
- Country: France
- Languages: Silent film French intertitles

Education of a Prince (French: Éducation de Prince) is a 1927 French silent comedy film directed by Henri Diamant-Berger and starring Edna Purviance, Pierre Batcheff and Flora le Breton. It was adapted by Henri Diamant-Berger from the 1900 play of the same title by Maurice Donnay. This was Purviance's last film before retiring the next year. In 1938 Alexander Esway directed a remake Education of a Prince with adaptation and screenplay written by Henri-Georges Clouzot.

== Cast ==
- Pierre Batcheff as Sacha
- Edna Purviance as La reine Liska de Silistrie
- Flora le Breton as Raymonde - La danseuse
- Jean Dax as René Cercleux
- Albert Préjean as Herch
- Armand Bernard as Le comte de Ronceval
- Pauline Carton as La concierge
- Jean Joffre as Le général Braoulitch
- Andrews Engelmann as Dimitri
- Jim Gérald
- Fernand Mailly
- Betove

== Bibliography ==
- Oscherwitz, Dayna & Higgins, MaryEllen . The A to Z of French Cinema. Scarecrow Press, 2009.
- Powrie, Phil & Rebillard, Éric. Pierre Batcheff and stardom in 1920s French cinema. Edinburgh University Press, 2009.
