= Kitty at Boarding School =

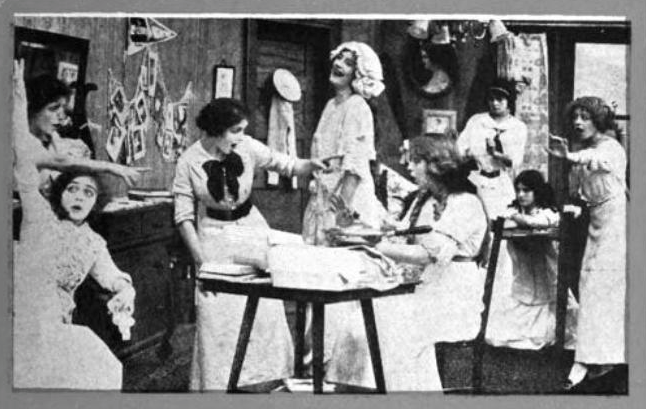
- Starring: Gertrude McCoy; Claire Adams; Elsie MacLeod; Bliss Milford
- Distributed by: Edison
- Release date: October 21, 1912
- Running time: 650 ft (approx.)
- Country: United States
- Languages: Silent; English intertitles

Kitty at Boarding School is a short American silent comedy film produced by the Edison Company in 1912.

== Release ==
The film was released in the United States on October 21, 1912, and remained in circulation on US screens through at least the following January.
