= Simeon Stuart =

British silent film actor (1864–1939)

Simeon Stuart (15 May 1864 – 25 November 1939) was a British film actor of the silent era.

== Selected filmography ==
- Snow in the Desert (1919)
- The Lady Clare (1919)
- The Face at the Window (1920)
- Inheritance (1920)
- The Auction Mart (1920)
- The Headmaster (1921)
- The Imperfect Lover (1921)
- A Gipsy Cavalier (1922)
- Love's Influence (1922)
- The Scourge (1922)
- Creation (1922)
- Afterglow (1923)
- Rob Roy (1922)
- Paddy the Next Best Thing (1923)
- The Temptation of Carlton Earle (1923)
- Réveille (1924)
- The Great Well (1924)
- Women and Diamonds (1924)
- Livingstone (1925)
- One of the Best (1927)
- The Vortex (1928)
- A Reckless Gamble (1928)
