= Edward Boulden =

American film actor and comedian (1879–1937)

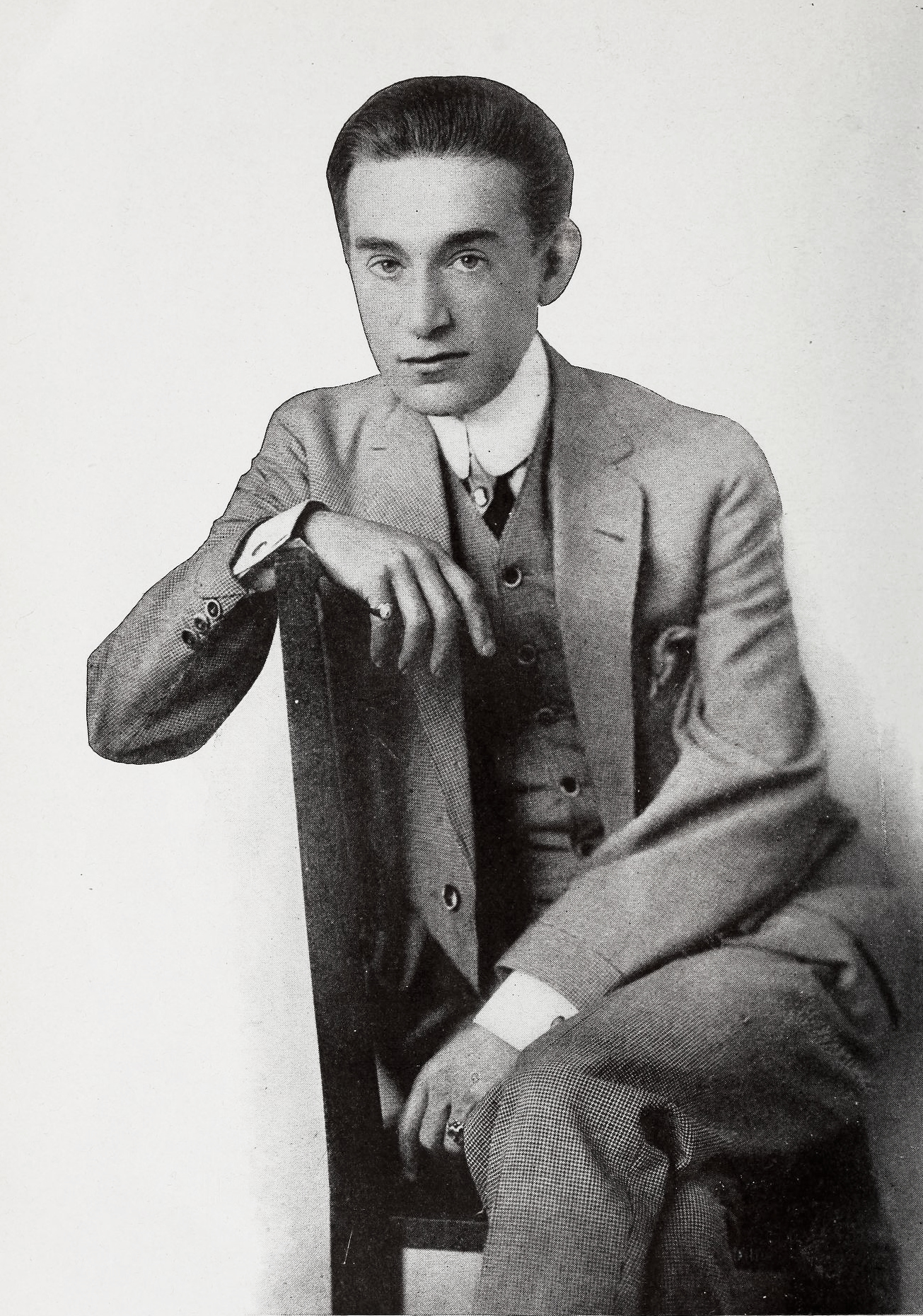
- Boulden in 1913
- Born: July 4, 1879; Pencader, Delaware, U.S.
- Died: August 29, 1937 (aged 58); Philadelphia, Pennsylvania, U.S.
- Occupations: Film actor; comedian; vaudevillian
- Years active: 1903–1921
- Era: Silent Era
- Employer: Edison Studios
- Known for: Acting in experimental kinetephone sound films
- Military career
- Allegiance: United States
- Service years: 1917–1918
- Rank: Private
- Conflicts: World War I

Edward Boulden (July 4, 1879 – August 29, 1937) was an American film actor, comedian, and vaudevillian—best known for starring in experimental kinetophone sound films from 1913 to 1914, such as The Edison Minstrels and Jack's Joke.

Nearing forty, he served in World War I, specifically as a private, at which point he resided in Philadelphia.
