= Laburnum Grove (play) =

Laburnum Grove is a comedy-drama play by the British writer J.B. Priestley which was first staged in 1933. It was one of Priestley's earliest hits. The play premiered at the Duchess Theatre on 28 November 1933. In its initial run it had over 300 performances. It made its Broadway debut at Booth's Theatre on 14 January 1935 and ran for 131 performances.

== Synopsis ==
In order to get rid of his sponging relatives, a man declares to them that he is a master forger. Considerable doubt begins to arise about whether he may actually be telling the truth.

== Adaptation ==
In 1936 the play was adapted into a film Laburnum Grove directed by Carol Reed and starring Edmund Gwenn and Victoria Hopper. It was made by Associated Talking Pictures at Ealing Studios.

A version of the play, starring Raymond Massey, was televised on CBS's Ford Theatre on January 27, 1950. The adaptation was by Edward Mabley.

== Bibliography ==
- Gale, Maggie Barbara. J.B. Priestley. Taylor & Francis, 2008.
- Kabatchnik, Amnon. Blood on the Stage, 1925-1950: Milestone Plays of Crime, Mystery and Detection. Scarecrow Press, 2010.
