= Sarah Broom Macnaughtan =

Scottish novelist and wartime aide (1864–1916)

- Born: 26 October 1864; Partick, Scotland
- Died: 24 July 1916 (aged 51); London, England
- Resting place: Chart Sutton
- Occupation: Writer

Sarah Broom Macnaughtan (26 October 1864 – 24 July 1916) was a Scottish novelist. With the outbreak of the First World War, she volunteered with the Red Cross Society and was sent to Russia, then Armenia. She wrote much about the plight of refugees from the Armenian genocide. She died of an illness contracted while abroad.

== Life ==
Born in Partick, Scotland, the fourth daughter and sixth child of Peter Macnaughtan and Julia Blackman, she was educated at home by her father. After her parents died, she moved to Kent in England, then to London. There she began a writing career with her first novel, Selah Harrison, published in 1898. Her best-known works were The Fortune of Christina M'Nab (1901), A Lame Dog's Diary (1905), and The Expensive Miss Du Cane (1900).

Meanwhile she travelled to Canada, South America, South Africa, the Middle East and India, among other locations. Sarah took part in the women's suffrage movement, aided victims of the Balkan Wars of 1912 and 1913, performed social services for London's East End poor and worked for the Red Cross in the Second Boer War.

With the outbreak of the First World War, she volunteered with the Red Cross Society. In September 1914 she travelled to Antwerp, Belgium, as part of an ambulance unit. After the evacuation of the city, she gave assistance in northern France, opening a soup kitchen in Adinkerke. For her work under fire in Belgium, she received the Order of Leopold.

Later in the war she moved to Russia, planning to provide medical assistance. She moved on to Yerevan, Armenia, where there was a refugee crisis after the Armenian genocide. Macnaughtan reported that Yerevan, with a population of 30,000, had about 17,000 refugees. She noted in her diary: "These unfortunate people have been nearly exterminated by massacres, and it has been officially stated that 75 per cent of the whole race has been put to the sword."

However, she fell ill on a trip through Persia and had to return to England, where she died from the illness. She was buried in the family plot in Chart Sutton.

An unfinished manuscript of hers became the basis for a book, My Canadian Memories, which was finished by her friend Beatrice Home and published in 1920. Macnaughton [sic] Road in Leaside, now part of Toronto, was named after her for her writing services.

== Media portrayal ==
Sarah Macnaughtan is one of the 14 main characters in the series 14 – Diaries of the Great War, played by actress Celia Bannerman. The documentary portrays her activities in Tiflis and Armenia. She is the only protagonist to die during the conflict, though this is actually not revealed until the very end, when birth and death dates are listed.

== Bibliography ==
- Selah Harrison (1899)
- The expensive Miss Du Cane (1900)
- The fortune of Christina M'Nab (1901)
- A lame dog's diary: a novel (1905)
- Three Miss Graemes (1908)
- Us four (1909)
- The Andersons (1910)
- Four-Chimneys: a novel (1912)
- Peter and Jane, or, The missing heir (1912)
- Snow upon the desert (1913)
- A green Englishman, and other stories of Canada (1914)
- They who question (1914)
- A woman's diary of the war (1915)
- Some elderly people & their young friends (1915)
- My war experiences in two continents (1919)
- My Canadian memories (1920) with Beatrice Home.

== See also ==
- Witnesses and testimonies of the Armenian genocide
