= Josephine Earle =

American actress (1892–1960)

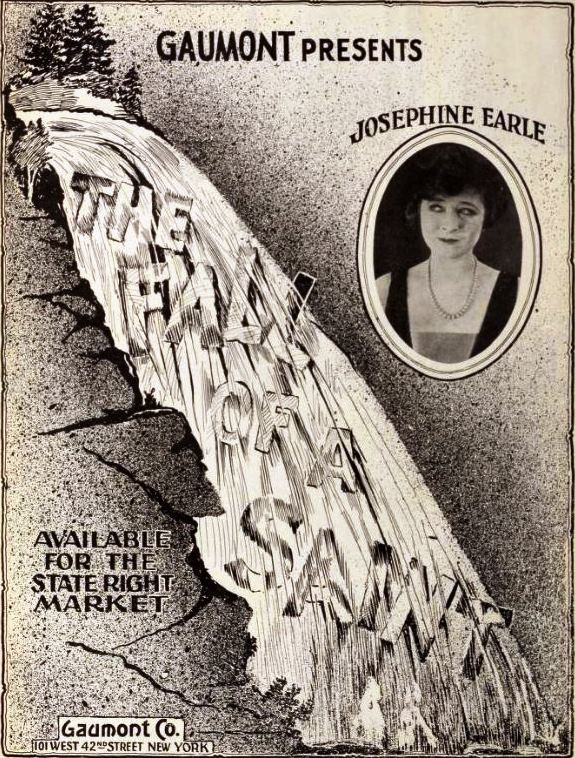
- American advertisement for The Fall of a Saint (1920)
- Born: Josephine MacEwan (or McEwan); February 23, 1892; Brooklyn, New York, U.S.
- Died: April 26, 1960 or 1961 (68 or 69); Stratford-upon-Avon, Warwickshire, England, UK
- Occupation: Actress
- Years active: 1912–1930
- Spouse(s): John T. Matthews (1932-?; his death); Captain James Alpheus Glen (1918-?; dissolved)

Josephine Earle (February 23, 1892 – April 26, 1960/1961) was an American silent film actress who worked in the United States and the United Kingdom. Born as Josephine MacEwan (sometimes listed as McEwan), she was of Scottish descent.

Her first role was in New York as the Beauty in Henry W. Savage's production of Everywoman (1911–12). In late 1917 she accepted an invitation to go to England and appear in the stage production of The Lilac Domino. After a very stormy passage she arrived mid December with bombs dropping on London; "I was really surprised when I arrived to find London was not nearly so black as it was painted in New York." At some point in mid 1919, she was snapped up by Gaumont.

== Personal life ==
She was married twice, first, on the Isle of Wight to Captain James Alpheus Glen, DSC (Royal Air Force), a Canadian air force pilot who flew with the RAF during the First World War, and, second, in London to John T. Matthews. Both unions were childless.

== Selected filmography ==
- The Two Edged Sword (1916)
- A Vampire Out of Work (1916)
- The Blue Envelope Mystery (1916)
- A Hungry Heart (1917)
- Indiscretion (1917)
- The Awakening (1917)
- The Fall of a Saint (UK, 1920)
- The Edge of Youth (1920)
- Walls of Prejudice (UK, 1920)
- Branded (1920)
- The Way of a Man (UK, 1921)
- The Knockout (1923)
- The Hotel Mouse (UK, 1923)
- Woman to Woman (UK, 1923)
- Raise the Roof (UK, 1930)
