= W. P. Kellino =

British music-hall artiste and film director (1873–1957)

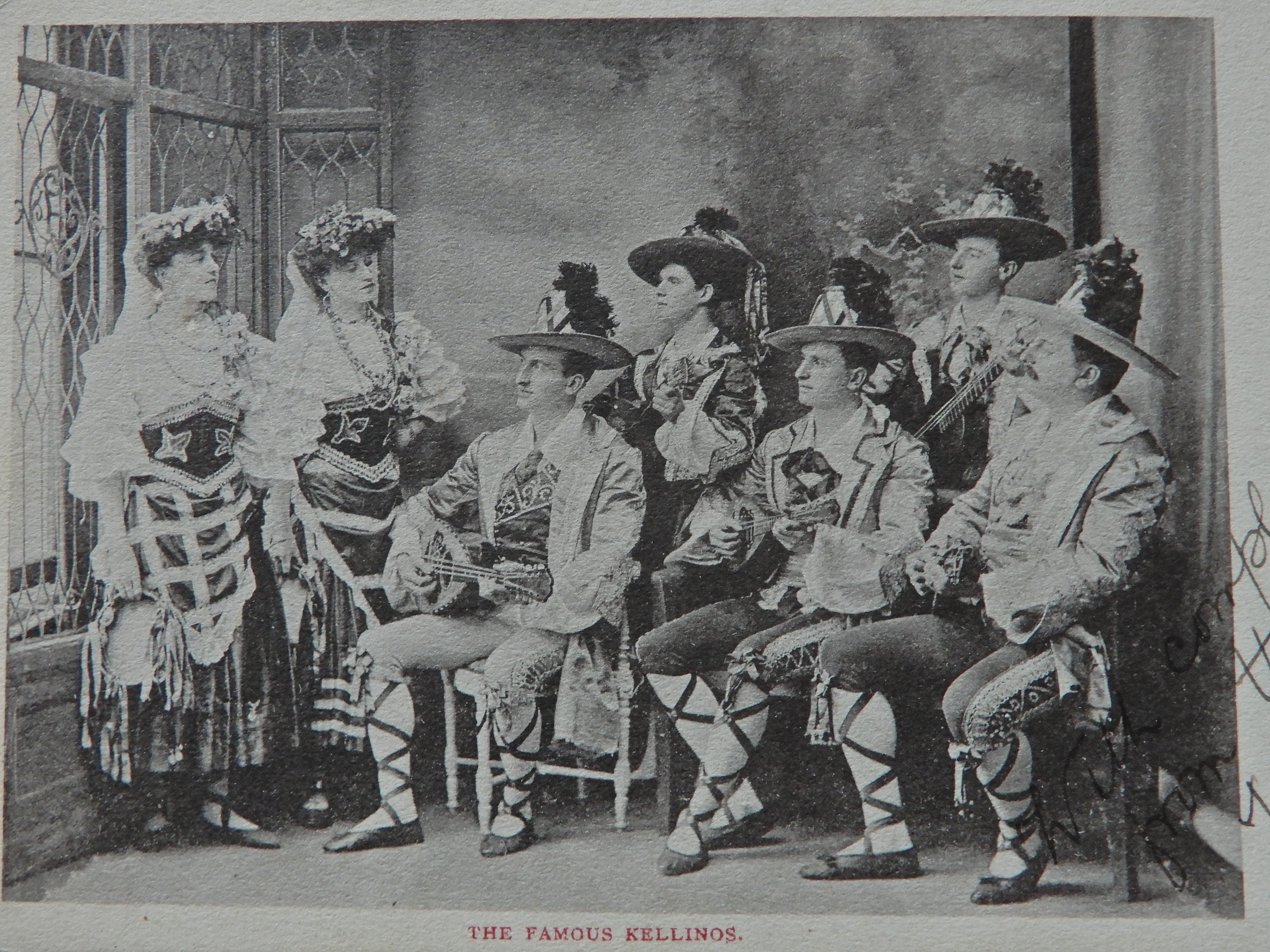
The Famous Kellinos starring WP with the group

William Philip Gislingham (13 September 1873 in London, England – 31 December 1957, in London, England) was a British music hall musician and acrobat (part of the Famous Kellinos) and, using the name W. P. Kellino, a film director.

He was producing films for Cricks and Martin when Matthew J McKeigue suggested that Billy Merson, who had never appeared in films, should be featured in a comedy. Gislingham and McKeigue fixed up the production of “A Spanish Lore Spasm”, which was Merson's first picture. For this they made use of Cricks and Martin's studio at Croydon.

The film was an instant success, and arrangements were immediately made for a second comedy, with Billy Merson as the star. They also decided to feature Merson in a series of two-reelers, and this decision brought about the formation of the Homeland Productions Syndicate, Ltd. and the purchase of a new studio at Twickenham under the banner of the Homeland Syndicate.

Homeland Syndicate, Ltd. was registered on 21 September 1915, with a capital of £1,000 in £l shares, to carry on the business of cinematographers and manufacturer of machines, films, apparatus and other accessories, etc. The directors were Gislingham, Billy Merson (named as Chairman and Managing Director in his real name of W. H. Thompson), and S Thompson.

The Merson Comedies produced by Homeland were:

- “The Only Man” (many scenes in this were made in Cardiganshire),
- The Man in Possession,
- The Terrible 'Tec,
- Perils of a Pork Pie,
- The Tale of a Shirt.
- A Stormy Courtship,
- Truthful Billy and Chuckles.

He was the father of the cinematographer Roy Kellino.

== Selected filmography ==
- The Green Terror (1919)
- Alf's Button (1920)
- The Fordington Twins (1920)
- The Fall of a Saint (1920)
- Saved from the Sea (1920)
- The Autumn of Pride (1921)
- Rob Roy (1922)
- Young Lochinvar (1923)
- The Mating of Marcus (1926)
- Sailors Don't Care (1928)
- Smashing Through (1929)
- Alf's Carpet (1929)
- Alf's Button (1930)
- Who Killed Doc Robin? (1931)
- The Poisoned Diamond (1934)
- Royal Cavalcade (1935)
- Lend Me Your Wife (1935)
- Pay Box Adventure (1936)
- Hot News (1936)
