= Diane Hart =

English actress (1926–2002)

- Born: Diane Lavinia Hart; 20 July 1926; Bedford, Bedfordshire, England
- Died: 7 February 2002 (aged 75); London, England
- Occupation: Actress
- Years active: 1942–1999
- Spouse: Kenneth MacLeod (1953–2002) (her death)
- Children: 2

Diane Lavinia Hart (20 July 1926 – 7 February 2002) was an English actress in both films and West End theatre, political campaigner, and inventor.

== Early life ==
Born in 1926, Hart was educated at various convents and then at Abbot's Hill School, King's Langley (where she was a Classics scholar). After her Matriculation at 14, she went to RADA at a very young age in 1941. She started working for the BBC as a secretary and, in the middle years of the Second World War, was an audio engineer, where she was instrumental in playing Hitler's speeches back to the Germans from the BBC in the UK over their airwaves.

== Career ==
In 1943, Hart started on stage as a feed in a double act with the comedian (later an agent) Pat Aza at the Finsbury Park Empire. This led to a six-month tour of the Moss Empires circuit on the halls. After this, she continued her war service entertaining the troops for ENSA.

Her theatre breakthrough came with her casting in a supporting role in Daughter Janie Apollo Theatre (1944), which led to William Douglas-Home's early hit The Chiltern Hundreds (Vaudeville Theatre (1946), and Booth Theatre, New York (1949). In this political light comedy, centred round an 'Earl of Lister' and a local by-election, Hart played the comic role of the young housemaid Bessie opposite A. E. Matthews.

== Later career ==
When Glynis Johns – the original choice – became unavailable for Terence Rattigan's comedy Who Is Sylvia? at the Criterion Theatre (1950), Hart was cast instead. In this production, she had to play three roles, one in each act, as an office girl, an actress and a model. The play opened at the home of Rattigan's first success, French Without Tears, and also co-starred two of its cast, Robert Flemyng and Roland Culver. It ran for just under a year and gained the young Hart positive critical reviews.

In Nancy Mitford's version of Andrew Roussin's French farce The Little Hut at the Lyric Theatre in 1950, Hart was cast for the West End version instead of the American actress who had created the role, Joan Tetzel, taking over opposite Robert Morley, with Peter Brook as director. She also enjoyed a six-month stint as Mollie Ralston in one of the earliest runs of The Mousetrap (Ambassadors Theatre (1953), and then abandoned the stage for 11 years in favour of television and the cinema.

In March 1963, she translated the Sardou play Divorce A La Carte and appeared in the production of the same with John Justin, Barry Shawzin and Katy Greenwood at the Phoenix Theatre in London. In 1964, she appeared on the West End stage with her friend, Margaret Lockwood (with whom she had first worked in The Wicked Lady) in Every Other Evening, also at the Phoenix. A long-running engagement came Hart's way with Joyce Rayburn's West End comedy The Man Most Likely To... (Vaudeville Theatre (1968), opposite Leslie Phillips. She had another long vaudeville residency acting with Terence Alexander and replacing Moira Lister in the successful Ray Cooney/John Chapman farce Move Over, Mrs Markham (1972).

Hart also participated in theatre in Sloane Square when she worked at the Royal Court Theatre. Her first appearance there was as the mother in an early Howard Barker play, Cheek at the Royal Court Theatre Upstairs (1970). She then took a role in Morality (Royal Court Theatre Upstairs, 1971), a piece by Jeremy Seabrook and Michael O'Neill, directed by William Gaskill, a domestic drama about a schoolboy involved in a homosexual relationship with a teacher.

In later years, she often worked in regional theatre, playing, among other parts, the title role in Somerset Maugham's Mrs Dot (Everyman Theatre, Cheltenham, 1974), in The Bank Manager (East Grinstead, 1974), Miss Adams Will Be Waiting (Yvonne Arnaud, Guildford, 1975) and The Pleasure Principle (New End, Hampstead 1989) and other plays.

Hart's film career started much earlier, in the 1940s, with a small role as a bridesmaid in the Margaret Lockwood costume drama The Wicked Lady (1945), and included a contract to 20th Century-Fox. Hart also worked for Jean Negulesco in Britannia Mews (1949), scripted by Ring Lardner Jr., and playing opposite David Niven in the musical Happy Go Lovely (1951). Hart's then husband, Kenneth MacLeod, was also in the film with a small part.

She made many television appearances, beginning at Alexandra Palace during the war, as well as radio performances for Val Gielgud. Hart played Ted Ray's wife in series 6 of the popular comedy series Ray's a Laugh.

Apart from acting, one of her inventions was the "Beatnix" corselet, which during the 1960s had large sales at Britain's Marks and Spencer. One customer was in the Soviet Union, Mrs Alexei Kosygin, the wife of the Russian premier. She also tried to persuade the Ministry of Defence to adopt another of her inventions, when she suggested they attach harrows to a helicopter to clear landmines during the Falklands campaign.

In politics, Hart once tried to set up a Women's Party for the UK. She posted an anonymous advertisement in the personal columns of The Times which read: "Ladies. Don't just sit there. If you are sick of castles in the air, sit in the House of Commons. Wanted, 630 ladies willing to gamble £500 each fighting a constituency." "Castles in the air" was a reference to Barbara Castle, MP, who at the time was the only prominent British female politician. Hart hired Caxton Hall in central London for a rally, but only about forty women turned up.

Later, she ran in the general election of 1970 as an independent candidate for Lewisham South, but lost her deposit. She was criticised by Germaine Greer in a footnote in the last pages of Greer's work The Female Eunuch.

In 1977, Hart led a legal action against the actors' union Equity, of which she was a longstanding member, to stop a referendum of their members over changes to union rules. Four years later, she also successfully took on the Aga Khan Foundation United Kingdom, conducting the five-day 'plaintiff in person' without legal counsel. She was awarded £750 damages at the High Court to compensate her for the noise and nuisance caused by the construction of the Ismaili Centre opposite her home in London nearby the Victoria and Albert Museum.

Hart was also plaintiff in person in her litigation in 1985, when she was awarded £15,000 in libel damages after a clip was taken from Games That Lovers Play (1971), a film in which she appeared with Joanna Lumley, Richard Wattis, Jeremy Lloyd, Penny Brahms and Nan Munro. This clip was incorporated illegally into a pornographic film called Electric Blue, 002.

In her last years, Hart spent time at the Chelsea Arts Club, where she was a member, and where every day completed The Times and The Daily Telegraph cryptic crosswords with great speed. She could usually be seen cycling to and from the club, between the West End and the King's Road, on her bicycle in a full-length mink coat.

== Personal life and death ==
For 12 years from 1956, Hart was married to the television broadcaster Kenneth MacLeod, until they separated in 1968. MacLeod was one of the first seen in the early days of Rediffusion, and from 1968 for many years he was the 6 o'clock evening Westward Diary anchorman at Westward Television. They had two daughters.

Hart died on 7 February 2002, aged 75.

== Filmography ==
Year	Title	Role	Notes
1945	The Wicked Lady	Minor Role	Uncredited
1947	The Ghosts of Berkeley Square	Minette	Uncredited
1949	Britannia Mews	The Blazer	
1951	Happy Go Lovely	Mae	
1951	I'll Never Forget You	Dolly	Uncredited
1952	Something Money Can't Buy	Joan	
1952	You're Only Young Twice	Ada Shore	
1952	Father's Doing Fine	Doreen her daughter	
1952	The Pickwick Papers	Emily Wardle	
1955	One Jump Ahead	Maxine	
1956	Keep It Clean	Kitty, Marchioness of Hurlingford	
1956	My Wife's Family	Stella Gay	
1959	The Crowning Touch	Tess	
1961	Enter Inspector Duval	Jackie	
1971	Games That Lovers Play	Mrs. Hill	
