= The Real Thing at Last =

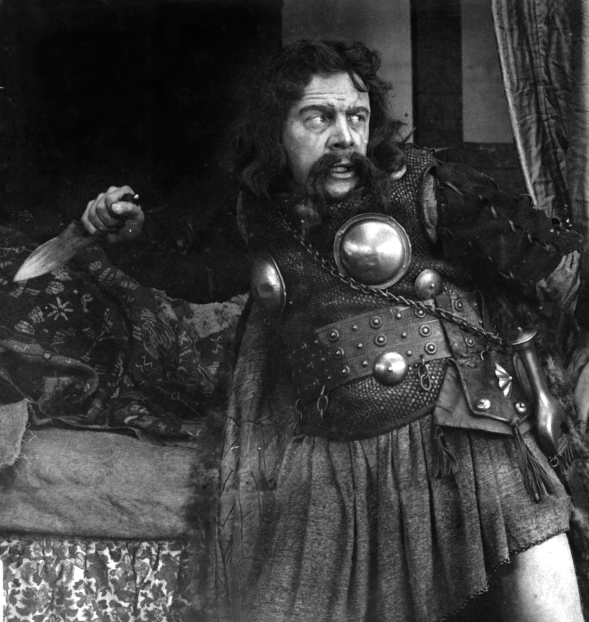
- Edmund Gwenn as Macbeth
- Directed by: L. C. MacBean; J. M. Barrie
- Written by: J. M. Barrie; William Shakespeare (original play)
- Produced by: A. E. Matthews
- Starring: Edmund Gwenn; Nelson Keys; Godfrey Tearle; Owen Nares; Norman Forbes
- Distributed by: British Actors Film Company
- Release date: 7 March 1916
- Running time: 30 minutes
- Country: United Kingdom
- Languages: Silent film (English intertitles)

The Real Thing at Last is a lost British satirical silent movie based on the play Macbeth. It was written in 1916 by Peter Pan creator and playwright J. M. Barrie as a parody of the American entertainment industry. The film was made by the newly created British Actors Film Company in response to news that American filmmaker D. W. Griffith intended to honor the 300th anniversary of William Shakespeare's death by producing of a film version of the play. It was subtitled A Suggestion for the Artists of the Future. It was screened at a charity benefit attended by the royal family, but was not widely distributed, and no copies are known to survive.

== Plot ==
Fictional American film producer Rupert K. Thunder (played on stage by Edmund Gwenn) hosted the 30-minute film live, commenting on it as it played.

It parodies the sensationalism of the American film industry of the day, including a controversial earlier adaptation of Macbeth, contrasting it with more reserved and understated British sensibilities. It loosely follows the plot of the play, but two versions of each depicted scene are shown:

In the British version, Lady Macbeth wiped a small amount of blood from her hands; in the American she had to wash away gallons of the stuff. In the British, the witches danced around a small cauldron; in the American the witches became dancing beauties cavorting around a huge cauldron. In the British, Macbeth and Macduff fought in a ditch; in the American Macbeth falls to his death from a skyscraper.

The endings also differed:

The British version ended with typical coy understatement: 'The elegant home of the Macbeths is no longer a happy one', while the American version blithely opted for closure of a different kind: 'The Macbeths repent and all ends happily.'

The piano accompaniment for the closing scene of Macbeth and Macduff reconciling is "Life's Too Short to Quarrel".

== Cast ==
- Edmund Gwenn as Rupert K. Thunder (live host), Macbeth
- Nelson Keys as Lady Macbeth
- Godfrey Tearle as Macduff
- Owen Nares as General Banquo
- Norman Forbes as Duncan
- Caleb Porter as Witch
- George Kelly as Witch
- Ernest Thesiger as Witch
- Gladys Cooper as American Witch
- Teddie Gerard as American Witch
- Pauline Chase as American Witch
- Frederick Volpe as Murderer
- Moya Mannering as Messenger
- A.E. Matthews as Murdered
- Marie Lohr as Murdered
- Frederick Kerr as Murdered
- Irene Vanbrugh as Lady
- Eva Rowland as Lady
- Arthur Shirley as Courtier
- Leslie Henson as Charlie Chaplin, William Shakespeare, Page
- Florence Alliston as Child

== Production ==
Although nominally directed by L. C. MacBean, Barrie took an active role in its direction. The film featured several popular British stage actors of the period, and thus served as the film debuts of Edmund Gwenn, Marie Lohr, Ernest Thesiger, and Frederick Kerr. Pauline Chase had been part of the original cast of Barrie's Peter Pan and played the title role for seven years; she came out of retirement for this, her only screen performance.

== Release ==
The film was presented at the London Coliseum as part of a benefit for the YMCA raising money to entertain the troops serving in the Great War. This was attended by Queen Mary, Princess Mary, and Prince Albert (later King George VI).
