= Games That Lovers Play =

Games That Lovers Play may refer to:

- Games That Lovers Play (film), 1971
- "Games That Lovers Play" (song), 1966
