= Who Is Sylvia? =

Who Is Sylvia? may refer to:

- Who Is Sylvia? (play), a 1950 comedy play by Terence Rattigan
- Who Is Sylvia? (TV series) a 1967 British television sitcom
- "Who is Silvia?", song from Shakespeare's play The Two Gentlemen of Verona
- "Who is Silvia?", English name for Franz Schubert's 1826 German-language Lied "An Sylvia" of Shakespeare's song

== See also ==
- The Goat, or Who Is Sylvia?, 2000 play by Edward Albee (title derived from Shakespeare's song)
