= Inheritance (1920 film) =

1920 film

- Directed by: Wilfred Noy
- Starring: Mary Odette; Jack Hobbs
- Production company: British Actors Film Company
- Release date: October 1920
- Country: United Kingdom
- Languages: Silent; English intertitles

Inheritance is a 1920 British silent drama film directed by Wilfred Noy and starring Mary Odette and Jack Hobbs.

== Plot ==
The story has been summed up as "Squire's son weds fishergirl who saved his life, becomes dockers' leader, and weds lady he loves on wife's death".

== Cast ==
- Mary Odette as Rachel
- Jack Hobbs as David StMaur
- Ursula Hughes as Peggy Falconer
- Simeon Stuart as Sir Henry StMaur
- D. J. Williams as Tulliver
- F. Pope-Stamper as Walter Clifford
- Mary Forbes as Lady Isabel

== Bibliography ==
- Palmer, Scott. British Film Actors' Credits, 1895-1987. McFarland, 1998.
