= The Lackey and the Lady =

- Directed by: Thomas Bentley
- Written by: Tom Gallon (novel); Thomas Bentley
- Starring: Leslie Howard; A. E. Matthews; Roy Travers
- Production company: British Actors Film Company
- Distributed by: Phillips Film Company
- Release date: March 1919
- Country: United Kingdom
- Language: English
- Budget: £4,000

The Lackey and the Lady is a 1919 British silent drama film directed by Thomas Bentley and starring Leslie Howard, A. E. Matthews and Roy Travers. It was based on a novel by Tom Gallon.

The film was the subject of a court case after its distributor Phillips Film Company refused to circulate it on the grounds of its alleged poor quality. The director Bentley sued for slander and won a judgement in his favour in the early 1920s. However, the negative publicity surrounding the film severely damaged the reputation of the British Actors Film Company which had been relaunched after the First World War with ambitious production plans but was eventually forced to merge with one of its larger rivals.

== Cast ==
- Leslie Howard as Tony Dunciman
- A. E. Matthews
- Roy Travers
- Alban Atwood as Mr. Dunciman
- F. Pope-Stamper as Garrett Woodruffe
- Mary Odette
- Violet Graham
- Adelaide Grace
- Jeff Barlow
- Gladys Foyle
- Athol Ford

== Bibliography ==
- Low, Rachael. History of the British Film, 1918-1929. George Allen & Unwin, 1971.
