= The Voice in the Fog =

1915 film by J. P. McGowan

- Directed by: J. P. McGowan
- Written by: Hector Turnbull (scenario)
- Based on: The Voice in the Fog by Harold McGrath
- Produced by: Jesse Lasky
- Starring: Donald Brian
- Cinematography: Charles Rosher
- Distributed by: Paramount Pictures
- Release date: September 27, 1915
- Running time: 5 reels
- Country: United States
- Language: Silent (English intertitles)

The Voice in the Fog is a lost 1915 silent film produced by Jesse Lasky and distributed by Paramount Pictures. J. P. McGowan directed the film which is based on a novel by Harold McGrath. Stage actor Donald Brian makes his screen debut in the film.

== Cast ==
- Donald Brian as Thomas Webb
- Adda Gleason as Kitty Killigrew
- Frank O'Connor as Mason (as Frank A. Connor)
- George Gebhardt as Mason's assistant
- Florence Smythe as Mrs. Killigrew
- Ernest Joy as Mr. Killigrew
