= The Notorious Landlady =

1962 film by Richard Quine

- Theatrical release poster
- Directed by: Richard Quine
- Screenplay by: Larry Gelbart; Blake Edwards
- Based on: "The Notorious Tenant"; 1956 story in Collier's by Margery Sharp
- Produced by: Fred Kohlmar
- Starring: Kim Novak; Jack Lemmon; Fred Astaire; Lionel Jeffries; Estelle Winwood
- Cinematography: Arthur Arling
- Edited by: Charles Nelson
- Music by: George Duning
- Production company: Columbia Pictures
- Distributed by: Columbia Pictures
- Release date: July 26, 1962
- Running time: 123 minutes
- Country: United States
- Language: English
- Box office: $2.7 million (US and Canada rentals)

The Notorious Landlady is a 1962 American comedy mystery film directed by Richard Quine from a screenplay by Larry Gelbart and Blake Edwards, based on the 1956 short story "The Notorious Tenant" by Margery Sharp. It stars Kim Novak, Jack Lemmon, and Fred Astaire, with Lionel Jeffries and Estelle Winwood. The film follows an American diplomat in London who rents a room from and falls in love with a young woman suspected of murder.

== Plot ==
William Gridley, a newly arrived American diplomat at the American Embassy in London, rents a room in the Mayfair townhouse of Carly Hardwicke, a charming young woman and a fellow American expatriate. When Gridley inquires about Carly's marital status, she replies that she is separated and is unaware of her husband's whereabouts. Later, Gridley tells his superior, Franklyn Ambruster, that he has rented a room from Carly. Her name sounds familiar to Ambruster, so he calls the research department for information on her.

Gridley and Carly go out on a date at a restaurant, where he is unaware that several patrons are staring and whispering about her. After they leave the restaurant, a mysterious man approaches Carly and she talks privately with him. The next day at the Embassy, Ambruster informs Gridley that Carly is suspected of murdering her husband Miles, but since his body has not been found, she cannot be prosecuted. Scotland Yard Inspector Oliphant tells Gridley that Carly tried to collect on Miles' life insurance a few weeks earlier. Determined to prove Carly's innocence, Gridley agrees to spy on her.

Returning to the townhouse, Gridley finds a suspicious note on the floor and inspects Carly's room, where he discovers some books about murder and a gun in her bedside table. When Carly unexpectedly returns home, Gridley hides in her closet and overhears her talking to someone on the phone about an unspecified task that needs to be done that night. That evening, as Gridley and Carly are having a barbeque in the backyard while all the next-door neighbors are watching them from their windows, Carly's awning accidentally catches fire.

After the fire makes the front page of national newspapers, Ambruster decides to transfer Gridley out of England to avoid further scandal, until Carly arrives at the Embassy to intercede on Gridley's behalf. Ambruster is immediately charmed by Carly, and after he takes her to lunch, he agrees with Gridley that Carly is innocent. The two men resolve to work together to clear her name. That night, they arrive outside the townhouse to see the mysterious man who spoke to Carly outside the restaurant leaving. Gridley follows him while Ambruster follows Carly, who leaves the townhouse shortly afterwards.

Gridley learns that the mysterious man is a minister and that Carly has sold him her organ because she is strapped for money. When Gridley returns to the townhouse, Carly asks him to leave, having packed his bags. He insists he does not care if she murdered her husband and tells her that he loves her. Gridley calls Oliphant to inform him that he will not spy on Carly anymore. During their conversation, a gunshot is heard. Gridley rushes to Carly's room to find her standing over Miles' body with a gun in her hand.

At her trial, Carly recounts on the stand that Miles sneaked into her room and admitted to setting her up for his murder. He had stolen valuable jewels, and had been faking his death since killing the assassin who was sent after him. Carly and Miles were struggling for his gun when it went off. At the coroner's inquest, Carly is exonerated when Agatha Brown, a private nurse for Carly's crippled next-door neighbor, Mrs. Dunhill, testifies that she witnessed Carly struggling with Miles before she killed him in self-defense.

After the inquest, Gridley overhears Mrs. Brown attempting to blackmail Carly for a pawn ticket to a candelabra that Miles used to stash the stolen jewels in. Carly realizes that it was actually Mrs. Dunhill who saw her kill Miles, not Mrs. Brown. Gridley and Carly try to retrieve the candelabra but find the pawnbroker murdered. They then locate Mrs. Brown in a Penzance seaside resort, where they catch her pushing Mrs. Dunhill's wheelchair down a cliff edge to silence her. Gridley saves Mrs. Dunhill while Carly knocks Mrs. Brown out, just as Ambruster and Oliphant arrive by helicopter. Ambruster reassigns Gridley to the United States, and Carly is going with him.

== Cast ==
- Kim Novak as Carlyle "Carly" Hardwicke
- Jack Lemmon as William "Bill" Gridley
- Fred Astaire as Franklyn Ambruster
- Lionel Jeffries as Inspector Oliphant
- Estelle Winwood as Mrs. Dunhill
- Maxwell Reed as Miles Hardwicke
- Philippa Bevans as Mrs. Agatha Brown
- Doris Lloyd as Lady Fallott
- Henry Daniell as the stranger
- Ronald Long as coroner
- Richard Peel as Sergeant Dillings
- Dick Crockett as Detective Carstairs (uncredited)
- Ottola Nesmith as flower woman (uncredited)
- Bess Flowers as courtroom spectator (uncredited)

== Production ==
The film was announced in December 1957 with Richard Quine to direct and Jack Lemmon to star opposite Victoria Shaw, and filming was originally scheduled to begin in February 1958. Blake Edwards wrote the first version of the script. Quine recruited writer Larry Gelbart to write a draft, and S. N. Behrman revised it.

Lemmon and Kim Novak had appeared together on screen twice previously, in Phffft (1954) and Bell, Book and Candle (1958). Novak, who had previously been engaged to marry Quine, was paid $600,000. It was her last performance for Columbia after eight years with the studio.

The song "A Foggy Day (in London Town)" by George and Ira Gershwin, which serves as the film's main theme, was introduced in the 1937 Fred Astaire film A Damsel in Distress.

Filming began on May 15, 1961. The opening London scenes were filmed at the Columbia Ranch in Burbank, California. The closing scenes set on the cliffs of Cornwall were filmed at Point Lobos State Natural Reserve in Carmel, California.

== Reception ==
In a contemporary review for The New York Times, critic Bosley Crowther wrote that the film is "well worth the viewing of anybody who wants a nice breezy comedy concocted with a little standard mystery and suspense" and succeeds despite Novak's performance: "[T]he title role is played by Kim Novak, and that simply does not augur well. Miss Novak is one of those performers who have cast so many drab and saggy palls over good motion pictures that one shudders to see her name in a cast. ... In short, Miss Novak is a flat tire. But Mr. Lemmon as the embassy chap makes up in solid measure for her lack of inflation and bounce."

=== Accolades ===
The film was nominated for Best Written American Comedy at the 15th Writers Guild of America Awards in 1963.

== See also ==
- List of American films of 1962
