= Donald Brian =

American entertainer (1877–1948)

- Donald Brian c. 1914
- Born: February 17, 1877; St. John's, Newfoundland
- Died: December 22, 1948 (aged 71); Great Neck, Long Island, New York
- Occupation(s): actor singer
- Years active: 1899–1939
- Spouses: Florence Meagher Gleason Pope (married 1910–?); Virginia O'Brien (1 daughter)

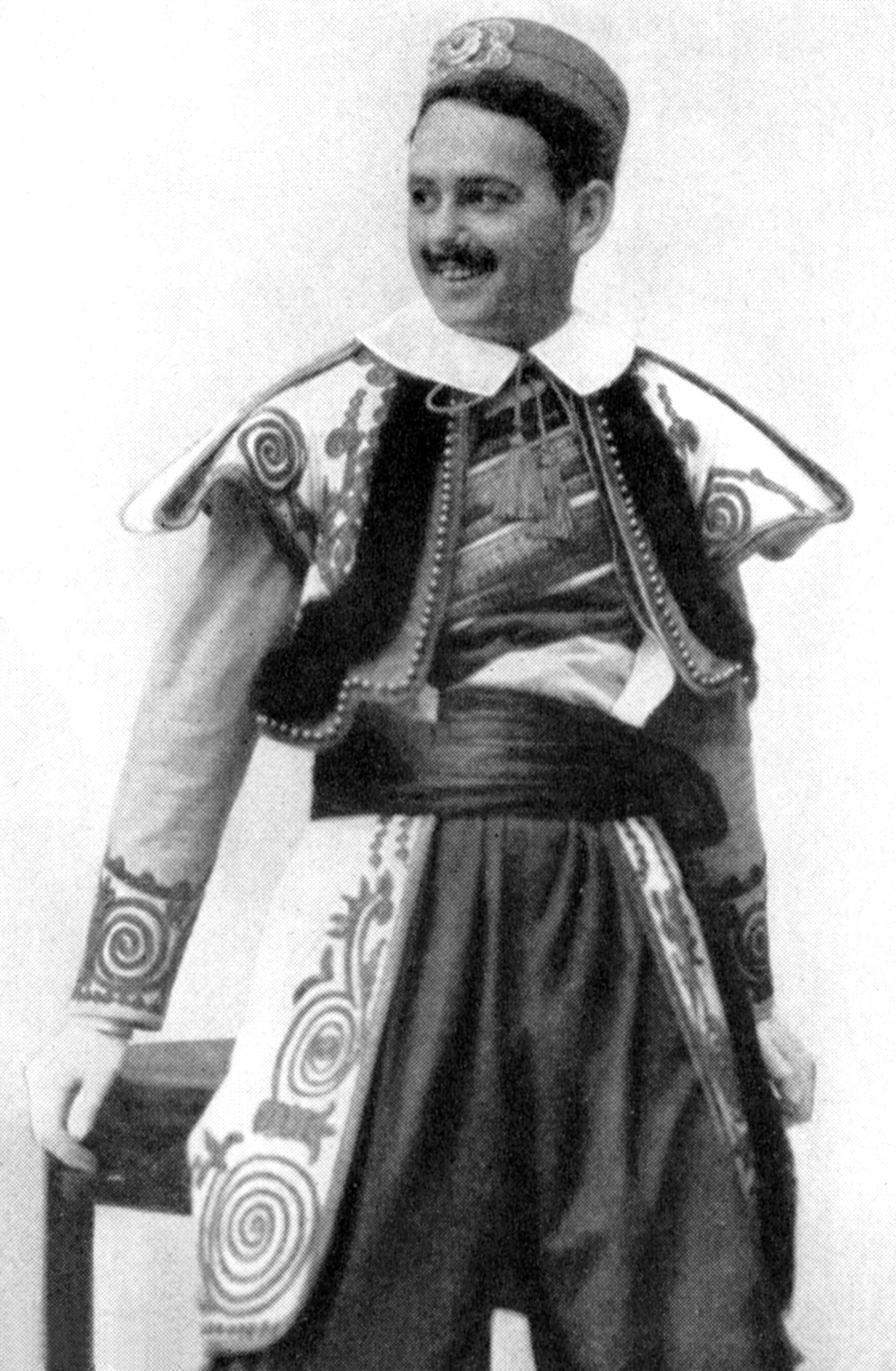
Donald Brian in the original Broadway production of The Merry Widow (1907)

Donald Brian (February 17, 1877 – December 22, 1948) was an actor, dancer and singer born in St. John's, Newfoundland (now Newfoundland and Labrador, Canada). In 1907, he starred in the hit operetta The Merry Widow.

== Life and career ==
Brian, a tenor, was employed in a Boston machine shop and, at the age of 16, began performing with a vocal quartet. When he joined a theatrical troupe in New York City, he was soon in demand as a leading man. He had leading roles in more than 20 Broadway musicals. In 1915 Brian signed with film producer Jesse L. Lasky to do two films, The Voice in the Fog (1915) and The Smugglers (1916). After the latter he made no more film appearances until the sound era. His first sound film was an excerpt of his role in Peggy O'Hooligan (1925), made in the DeForest Phonofilm sound-on-film process.

Brian was president of the Catholic Actors Guild of America.

He was married twice—to Florence Meagher Gleason Pope in 1910, and second to stage actress Virginia O'Brien(1896-?) (not to be confused with the film actress born 1919). He and O'Brien had one daughter, Denise.

Brian died on December 22, 1948, in Great Neck, New York, aged 73.

== Selected Broadway musicals and operettas ==
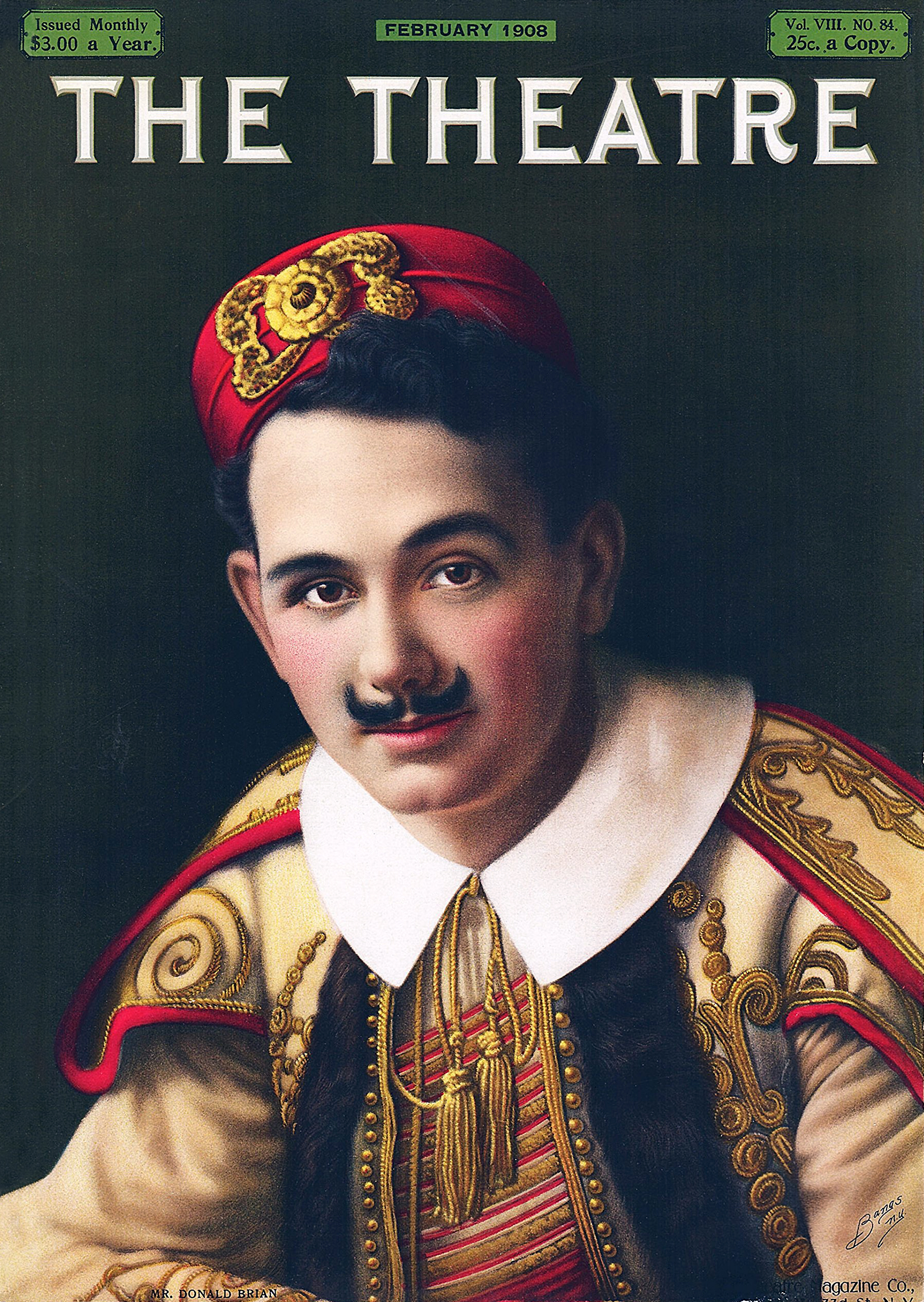
Donald Brian as Danilo in The Merry Widow, on the cover of The Theatre (February 1908)

- 1899 – On the Wabash
- 1902 – Florodora
- 1904 – Little Johnny Jones
- 1906 – Forty-five Minutes from Broadway
- 1907 – The Merry Widow
- 1909 – The Dollar Princess
- 1911 – The Siren
- 1913 - The Marriage Market
- 1914 – The Girl From Utah
- 1916 – Sybil
- 1918 – The Girl Behind the Gun
- 1919 – Buddies
- 1921 – The Chocolate Soldier
- 1922 – Up She Goes
- 1925 – Peggy O'Hooligan
- 1926 – No, No, Nanette
- 1939 – Very Warm for May

== See also ==
- List of people of Newfoundland and Labrador
