= The Rescuers (book) =

1959 children's novel by Margery Sharp

- First UK edition
- Author: Margery Sharp
- Illustrator: Garth Williams (US); Judith Brook (UK)
- Language: English
- Series: The Rescuers
- Genre: Children's literature
- Publisher: Little, Brown (US); Collins (UK)
- Publication date: 1959
- Publication place: England
- Media type: Print (hardback & paperback)
- Pages: 160
- Followed by: Miss Bianca

The Rescuers is a British children's novel written by Margery Sharp and illustrated by Garth Williams. Its first edition was published in 1959 by Collins in the United Kingdom and Little, Brown in the United States. The novel is the first in a series of nine about Miss Bianca, a socialite mouse who volunteers to lend assistance to people and animals in danger.

== Plot ==
The story begins in an unnamed, supposedly "barely civilized" country, (Note: The journey to the Mice's unnamed home country from Norway is recounted in great detail. Among other place names, it's mentioned the boat travels through the North Sea and the Bay of Biscay into the Mediterranean Sea, passing both Italy and Greece long before arrival. The country is also described as having high mountains, many rivers and vast deserts, suggesting a Middle-eastern or Southeastern European country.) during a meeting of the Prisoners' Aid Society, an international organization of mice dedicated to brightening the lives of prisoners. (Note: The Prisoners' Aid Society appears to be modelled after the International Committee of the Red Cross.) When the chairwoman mouse informs delegates about the case of a Norwegian poet, imprisoned (presumably wrongfully) in the horrible Black Castle, she suggests changing the traditional rules of the organization to try to rescue him. Despite her elderly secretary's doubts, the Society agrees with her proposal. Needing a mouse who can speak the Norwegian language to translate for them, the society decides to ask Miss Bianca for help. Miss Bianca is a white mouse who is pampered by the Ambassador's little boy, and the Ambassador is about to be transferred to Norway.

Bernard, a young mouse who lives in the embassy pantry and who has won a medal for "bravery in the face of cats", is volunteered by his friends and reluctantly agrees to talk to Miss Bianca. He uses the service lift in the pantry to enter the schoolroom of the Ambassador's house, and finds Miss Bianca in the magnificent porcelain pagoda the boy has given her. Bernard tries to convince her to find a brave Norwegian mouse for them once she is in Norway. Though she is herself a poet and believes strongly in duty, Miss Bianca is at first terrified and refuses. However, as Bernard pleads with her, Miss Bianca begins to have feelings for Bernard, who makes no secret of the fact he is in love with her and would take her place if he could. When Miss Bianca travels to Oslo with the Ambassador's family, she decides to undertake the mission, later deciding to personally return with the Norwegian mouse so she can see Bernard again.

Upon arrival in Oslo, Miss Bianca escapes the little boy's room and enters an underground wine cellar full of sailor mice at a bachelor party. The Petty Officer volunteers a sturdy, seasoned adventurer named Nils for the mission, and Nils instantly agrees. He takes Miss Bianca back to the Prisoner's Aid Society, the first half of the journey stowing away on a cargo ship and the rest of the way by speedboat (a toy of the Ambassador's son). Miss Bianca plans to bid Bernard one last fond goodbye and return to her home; however, when Bernard volunteers to help Nils at the Black Castle, Miss Bianca impulsively decides to do the same.

The three mice hitch a ride on a supply wagon, and travel two weeks across country to the prison, located in the nearly impenetrable ruins of an old castle. They find the castle's only mouse hole in the Head Jailer's office (the only chamber with wooden walls) and set up living quarters. However, expeditions by Bernard and Nils show the mission is nearly hopeless—all the doors in the castle are heavy iron, there are very few places to hide, and they are constantly in danger of Mamelouk, the Head Jailer's gigantic black half-Persian cat.

At first, Miss Bianca serves as de facto chairwoman, but soon begins to take a more active part in the mission when she encounters Mamelouk and discovers her charm and wit both infuriate and fascinate him. She begins to distract Mamelouk by baiting him into conversation and taunting him, both easy tasks as he is incredibly boastful and equally stupid. At one point, she discovers a paper attached by treacle to Mamelouk's fur; this turns out to be a lament written by the Norwegian poet, proving he is still alive. Another day, she is able to get Mamelouk to admit he and all the jailers will be practically comatose on New Year's Day, having eaten and drunk more than their fill at a New Year's Eve party the night before. Bernard and Nils, now able to explore more freely with Mamelouk distracted, discover that the river that runs below the castle, swollen by a sudden storm, has washed away rocks blocking up an old water gate. Mamelouk catches Nils and Bernard as they return to Miss Bianca with the news, but she tricks him into slackening his grip, and they escape.

After packing up the living quarters, the mice set out on New Year's Day. They manage to steal the keys from a sleeping/drunk guard, who conveniently had unlocked the cell hall door before he collapsed. They travel past the cells, with Nils calling out in Norwegian, finally getting a response from a sick and emaciated young man with overgrown hair and nails. This is indeed the poet - being an artist and a dreamer, he is the only one in the prison who can believe the mice really are talking to him. He uses the key to leave his cell, follows them to the water gate, and escapes. The whole party nearly drowns in the freezing, swollen river, but they are rescued by a kindly family traveling on a large raft. Having no respect for the Black Castle, the family takes the poet and the mice downriver as far as they can, no questions asked.

The three mice are welcomed back to headquarters amidst a huge celebration, and several artifacts of their time in the Black Castle are framed in the meeting hall for posterity. All three mice receive new silver medals with a picture of a broken fetter etched upon them, as well. Healed and cleaned up by the barge people, the poet thanks the mice and returns to Norway, promising to meet up with Nils in Oslo. Miss Bianca gives Nils the speedboat, in which he sails home to Norway, and Bernard invites Miss Bianca to live with him. She nearly accepts, until the Ambassador's footman discovers her and picks her up, commenting on how much the Ambassador's little boy has grieved for her. Deciding her duty is to comfort the boy, she bids Bernard farewell, and returns to her beloved master, much to the joy of the household. Nils and the poet meet up in Oslo and have a night on the town together; afterwards, the poet publishes some verses about Miss Bianca which become famous, and Bernard becomes the new secretary of the Prisoner's Aid Society.

== Reception ==
Kirkus Reviews described the book as "an absurd and beguiling fantasy" that was "made to order for Walt Disney—but a strange departure for Margery Sharp", and shortly after its publication, Walt Disney Productions began developing an adaptation of the novel. The result was the animated film The Rescuers, released in 1977 and based primarily on the second novel in the series, Miss Bianca, with elements from the original novel.

In his 1997 collection of essays on children's literature, A Child's Delight, Noel Perrin noted that the book is very different from (and in his opinion far superior to) the movie, commending the book for its inventive plot and for the "ease and freedom", "elegance", and "irony" of Sharp's writing.

In 2011, a decade after going out of print, the book was reissued in a new edition by The New York Review of Books. Reviewer Meghan Cox Gurdon of The Wall Street Journal noted that the book "is much funnier and more interestingly textured than the high-fructose movie version."
