= F. Pope Stamper =

English actor (1877–1950)

Frederick Pope Stamper (20 November 1877 – 12 November 1950), usually credited as F. Pope Stamper or F. Pope-Stamper, less often as Pope Stamper, was an English stage and film actor who appeared mostly in Edwardian musical comedy.

Born at Hammersmith in 1877, Stamper was a stage actor both before and after appearing in silent movies. He had little screen work after the arrival of the "talkies".

In 1902, at Lambeth, he married Daisy Leahy, an Irish chorus girl and actress who used the stage name of Daisy Le Hay.

In 1907 he appeared in the musical comedy Miss Hook of Holland at the Prince of Wales Theatre, creating the role of the Bandmaster; the musical enjoyed a run of 462 performances. In 1911 he appeared in a Charles Frohman production of The Siren at the Knickerbocker Theatre on Broadway, and the same year he played Captain Charteris in A Quiet Girl, at New York's Park Theatre, with a run of 240 performances.

Stamper was a good golfer, but while in New York with a leading role in the Broadway production of The Dollar Princess, he played a round of golf with a Miss Melrose at the Dunwoodie Country Club, in Yonkers, injured the lady by slicing a drive, and faced a claim which was reported as a notable case on the law of torts.

Stamper had a brother, Charles William Stamper, who was motor engineer to King Edward VII, and a son, Henry Lionel Pope Stamper (1906–1985), who enraged his father by abandoning a job his father had got for him in the City of London to become an unsuccessful repertory actor. His granddaughter Rosemary Stamper is the mother of the comedian Jack Dee.

== Selected films ==
- The Girl from the Sky (1914): Harold Teale (as Pope Stamper)
- Ghosts (1914): The Man (as Pope Stamper)
- The Divine Gift (1918): Tristan
- The Lackey and the Lady (1919): Garrett Woodruffe
- Inheritance (1920): Walter Clifford
- The Pride of the Fancy (1920): Oswald Gordon
- A Master of Craft (1922): Mate
- The Musical Beauty Shop (short film, 1930): John
- The Stickpin (short film, 1933): Simms
