= The Man Who Loved Redheads =

1955 British comedy film

- Directed by: Harold French
- Written by: Terence Rattigan
- Produced by: Josef Somlo
- Starring: Moira Shearer; John Justin; Roland Culver
- Cinematography: Georges Périnal
- Edited by: Bert Bates
- Music by: Benjamin Frankel
- Production company: London Film Productions
- Distributed by: British Lion Films (UK)
- Release date: 7 February 1955 (UK)
- Running time: 100 minutes
- Country: United Kingdom
- Language: English
- Box office: £94,870 (UK)

The Man Who Loved Redheads is a 1955 British comedy film directed by Harold French and starring Moira Shearer, John Justin and Roland Culver. The film is written by Terence Rattigan based on his play Who Is Sylvia? (1950) which is reputedly a thinly veiled account of the author's philandering father. The film follows the play fairly closely, its main difference being the turning of Sylvia into a redhead.

The film contains a ballet sequence featuring extracts from The Sleeping Beauty, which was decorated by Loudon Sainthill.

== Plot ==
Young peer and junior member of the Foreign Office, Mark St. Neots, is obsessed with the memory of Sylvia, a 16-year-old redhead he met at a party as a boy, and vowed he would love forever. Now older and respectably married, Mark still retains his image of the beautiful young girl with the red hair, and spends the rest of his life searching for her through a string of casual affairs.

== Cast ==
- Moira Shearer as Sylvia / Daphne / Olga / Colette
- John Justin as Mark St. Neots, Lord Binfield
- Roland Culver as Oscar
- Gladys Cooper as Caroline, Lady Binfield
- Denholm Elliott as Dennis
- Harry Andrews as Williams
- Patricia Cutts as Bubbles
- Moyra Fraser as Ethel
- John Hart as Sergei
- Joan Benham as Chloe
- Jeremy Spenser as young Mark
- Melvyn Hayes as Sydney
- Kenneth More as narrator

== Production ==
The film was the last movie from director Harold French:

I didn't like that – I didn't enjoy making it, or seeing it. I got on all right with Moira but I didn't think she was quite strong enough. I felt we were under-cast. You couldn't meet a nicer man than the leading man, John Justin, but I really wanted Kenneth More. But it wasn't a very good play and Terry did the screenplay as well. Of course Gladys Cooper steals the whole thing in the last few minutes... I quarrelled with Korda about it. I had a clause in my contract with him that he wasn't to come on the set, but he did come a few times and suggest very old fashioned ideas. His days as a great producer were pretty much over by then and he was tired.

== Critical reception ==
In a contemporary reviews The Monthly Film Bulletin wrote: "Here is that world of one-level character drawing that one hoped the British cinema had left behind for ever. ... Moira Shearer's style of acting matches the material; she regains her authority in a version of the Sleeping Beauty ballet and in her delightfully danced Charleston. John Justin's performance is not proof against the fact that comic infidelity among the English, when not expressed in terms of farce, can easily look lascivious. Gladys Cooper deals with her part with commendable tact: that a woman should be aware of her husband's constant infidelities for some forty years and not utter a word is surely carrying the idea of upper-class dignity a little far."

Kine Weekly wrote: "Moira Shearer not only dances delightfully and breaks into a Charleston, but also proves herself to be a brilliant character actress by living Ihe parts of Sylvia, Daphne, Olga and Colette. John Justin is just right as the pompous, yet susceptible, Mark, Roland Culver makes a charming reprobate as Oscar, and Gladys Cooper and Harry Andrews also register as Caroline and Oscar's butler respectively."

Variety wrote: "The entire plot is done with a bright, nimble touch ... Harold French's polished direction is matched by other technical credits."

The New York Times wrote "With the aid of an expert cast and a director endowed with a deft, comic touch and a high regard for the subtleties of the English language, Mr. Rattigan and the producers have created a charming lark, light as a zephyr and just as welcome these days," before singling out Moira Shearer, who "In essaying the roles of the 'redheads,' has developed acting talents that are both surprising and refreshing".

The Evening Standard wrote of the film, "it's featherweight, but it's fun".

TV Guide called it "An engaging British comedy".

Sky Cinema found it "Sometimes witty but often dated," concluding that "The film's attitudes to class do it little credit, but there is compensation in a string of cameo roles played with real dry wit: Harry Andrews' butler, Joan Benham's model, Patricia Cutts' good time girl, Moyra Fraser's sardonic Ethel and, perhaps best of all, Gladys Cooper as a wife of long experience who has all the answers."
