= Margery Sharp =

English author (1905–1991)

- Photo portrait by Bill Brandt, 1945
- Born: Clara Margery Melita Sharp; 25 January 1905; Salisbury, Wiltshire, England
- Died: 14 March 1991 (aged 86); Aldeburgh, Suffolk, England
- Education: Bedford College, University of London
- Spouse: Major Geoffrey Castle

Clara Margery Melita Sharp (25 January 1905 – 14 March 1991) was an English writer of 25 novels for adults, 14 children's novels, four plays, two mysteries, and numerous short stories. Her best-known work is The Rescuers series about a heroic mouse named Miss Bianca and her partner Bernard, which was later adapted into the animated feature film The Rescuers (1977) – and a sequel, The Rescuers Down Under (1990) – by Walt Disney Productions.

== Life ==
Sharp was born in the district of Salisbury in the county of Wiltshire, England, although her family originated from northern Yorkshire. She spent part of her childhood in Malta, a period she later drew on for her novel The Sun in Scorpio. In 1914 she returned to Britain and studied at Streatham High School. She read French at Bedford College, University of London. She then spent a year studying art at Westminster Art School. While studying she joined the British University Women's Debating Team and was a member of the first team to compete in the United States.

Punch magazine began publishing her stories when she was 21. She went on to write for a number of American and British magazines, including Harper's Bazaar, Ladies' Home Journal and Good Housekeeping. Sharp's first novel, Rhododendron Pie, took her a month to write and was published in 1930.

In 1938 she married aeronautical engineer Major Geoffrey Castle. During World War II she worked for three years as an Army Education Lecturer; during this time she wrote the novel Cluny Brown and worked on Britannia Mews, which described the bombing of London.

In 1940 her seventh novel, The Nutmeg Tree, was adapted into a Broadway play, The Lady in Waiting. In 1948 the book was adapted into the Hollywood film Julia Misbehaves, starring Greer Garson and Walter Pidgeon. One of her most popular novels, Cluny Brown, the story of a plumber's niece turned parlourmaid, was also made into a Hollywood film by Ernst Lubitsch in 1946, with Academy Award winner Jennifer Jones in the title role. The rights for the novel Britannia Mews were bought in 1946 by 20th Century Fox, and it was released as The Forbidden Street in 1949. The 1963 film The Notorious Landlady was based on her 1956 short story "The Notorious Tenant".

In 1959 she published The Rescuers, and though written for an adult audience it became hugely popular with children. Sharp continued the series with a further eight books, illustrated by Garth Williams – who had previously illustrated other children's classics such as EB White's Charlotte's Web and Stuart Little – and Erik Blegvad. In 1977 Walt Disney Productions released the animated feature film The Rescuers, which had critical acclaim and financial success, followed by a sequel, The Rescuers Down Under, in 1990, which did not fare nearly as well.

Sharp died in Aldeburgh, Suffolk on 14 March 1991. In 2008 all of her adult books except for The Eye of Love were out of print, but in 2016 Kindle editions of ten of her novels were issued.

== Selected works ==
=== Adult novels ===
- Rhododendron Pie (1930)
- Fanfare for Tin Trumpets (1932)
- The Nymph and The Nobleman (1932)
- The Flowering Thorn (1934)
- Sophy Cassmajor (1934)
- Four Gardens (1935)
- The Nutmeg Tree (1937), which was made into the film Julia Misbehaves
- Harlequin House (1939)
- The Stone of Chastity (1940)
- Three Companion Pieces (1941) – contains Sophy Cassmajor, The Tigress on the Hearth and The Nymph and the Nobleman
- Cluny Brown (1944), which was made into a movie of the same title
- Britannia Mews (1946), which was made into the film The Forbidden Street
- The Foolish Gentlewoman (1948)
- Lise Lillywhite (1951)
- The Gipsy in the Parlour (1954)
- The Tigress on the Hearth (1955)
- The Eye of Love (1957) – Martha Trilogy I
- Something Light (1960)
- Martha in Paris (1962) – Martha Trilogy II
- Martha, Eric and George (1964) – Martha Trilogy III
- The Sun in Scorpio (1965)
- In Pious Memory (1967)
- Rosa (1969)
- The Innocents (1972)
- The Lost Chapel Picnic and Other Stories (1973)
- The Faithful Servants (1975)
- Summer Visits (1977)

=== Wordless Novels ===
- Melisande. Little Brown & Co, USA; 1960

=== Children's novels ===
- Lost at the Fair (1965)
- The Magical Cockatoo (1974)
- The Children Next Door (1974)

==== The Rescuers series ====
1. The Rescuers (1959)
2. Miss Bianca (1962)
3. The Turret (1963)
4. Miss Bianca in the Salt Mines (1966)
5. Miss Bianca in the Orient (1970)
6. Miss Bianca in the Antarctic (1971)
7. Miss Bianca and the Bridesmaid (1972)
8. Bernard the Brave (1977)
9. Bernard into Battle (1978)

=== Other ===
- "The Notorious Tenant" (1956), short story on which the movie The Notorious Landlady was based
