= The Divine Gift =

1918 British film by Thomas Bentley

- Directed by: Thomas Bentley
- Written by: Kenelm Foss
- Starring: Joyce Dearsley; Ernest Hendrie; Henrietta Watson
- Production company: British Actors Film Company
- Distributed by: Phillips Film Company
- Release date: August 1918
- Country: United Kingdom
- Language: English

The Divine Gift is a 1918 British silent drama film directed by Thomas Bentley and starring Joyce Dearsley, Ernest Hendrie and Henrietta Watson. It was made at Bushey Studios.

== Cast ==
- Joyce Dearsley as The Shopgirl
- Ernest Hendrie as The Professor
- Henrietta Watson as The Hostess
- Madge Saunders as The Mother
- Muriel Dole as Katharine
- F. Pope-Stamper as Tristan
- Wanda Redford as Iseult
- Micheline Poteus as Prehistoric Woman

== Bibliography ==
- Low, Rachael. History of the British Film, 1914-1918. Routledge, 2005.
