= They Came to a City (play) =

1943 film

- Original language: English
- Written by: J.B. Priestley
- Genre: Drama

Premiere
- Date: 25 January 1943
- Place: Princes Theatre, Bradford

They Came to a City is a 1943 play by the British writer J.B. Priestley.

After premiering at the Princes Theatre, Bradford it transferred to the Globe Theatre in London's West End. It ran for 280 performances between 21 April and 11 December 1943. The cast included John Clements, Googie Withers, Raymond Huntley, A.E. Matthews and Renee Gadd.

== Adaptation ==
In 1944 it was made into a film by Ealing Studios, directed by Basil Dearden and with the cast all reprising their roles.

== Bibliography ==
- Goble, Alan. The Complete Index to Literary Sources in Film. Walter de Gruyter, 1999.
- Wearing, J.P. The London Stage 1940-1949: A Calendar of Productions, Performers, and Personnel. Rowman & Littlefield, 2014.
