= They Came to a City =

1944 British film by Basil Dearden

- Directed by: Basil Dearden
- Written by: Basil Dearden; Sidney Cole; J.B. Priestley
- Based on: They Came to a City by J.B. Priestley
- Produced by: Michael Balcon; Sidney Cole
- Starring: John Clements; Googie Withers; Raymond Huntley; Renee Gadd
- Cinematography: Stanley Pavey
- Edited by: Michael Truman
- Music by: Ernest Irving
- Production company: Ealing Studios
- Distributed by: Ealing Distribution
- Release date: August 1944
- Running time: 78 minutes
- Country: United Kingdom
- Language: English

They Came to a City is a 1944 British black-and-white science-fiction film directed by Basil Dearden and starring John Clements, Googie Withers, Raymond Huntley, Renee Gadd and A. E. Matthews. It was adapted from the 1943 play of the same title by J. B. Priestley, and is notable for including a cameo appearance by Priestley as himself and its exploration of themes of class, social change, and utopia through the experience of nine British individuals transported to a mysterious city, which appears to be a utopia, where they are offered a chance to live.

The plot concerns the experiences of these varied people who have a chance to live permanently in what is offered to them as an "ideal" city. The film depicts their hopes and reasons for choosing whether or not to do so. Their emotions are varied, reflecting different social and economic backgrounds.

Many of the cast had performed their roles in the original West End stage production. The film's art direction was by Michael Relph.

== Plot ==
The story is framed as a tale told to a young couple by a stranger walking in a field overlooking a small British industrial city during WWII. The unnamed stranger is played by J.B. Priestley; his story is framed as a parable as to how people might live after the war, if they were presented with the opportunity to live in a utopia.

The story: Nine people from different walks of life and class are brought by unknown means to a mysterious, modernistic and empty castle-like structure. The nine people are Sir George Gedney, a misanthropic aristocrat; Malcolm Stritton, a bank clerk who is dissatisfied with the current political system; Dorothy Stritton, Malcolm's domineering and jealous wife; Alice Foster, an unhappy waitress; Mr. Cudworth, a money-obsessed businessman; needy Lady Loxfield and her compliant daughter Philippa; cynical, free-thinking seaman Joe Dinmore; and Mrs. Batley, a practical charwoman.

The nine interact – not always agreeably – and after a time, they discover the castle overlooks a city, and a door opens to allow them to access the city. We never see the city, but the nine return to the castle and discuss what they have experienced. Some see the city (which is implied to run on socialistic principles) as a utopian society, others as a place they did not want to live in. Before sundown, each of the nine must make a permanent decision whether to stay and live in the city (and never return to their original homes), or to leave the city never to return.

== Cast ==
- John Clements as Joe Dinmore
- Googie Withers as Alice Foster
- Raymond Huntley as Malcolm Stritton
- Renee Gadd as Dorothy Stritton
- A. E. Matthews as Sir George Gedney
- Mabel Terry-Lewis as Lady Loxfield
- Frances Rowe as Philippa Loxfield
- Ada Reeve as Mrs. Batley
- Norman Shelley as Cudworth

uncredited:

- J.B. Priestley as the stranger
- Brenda Bruce as WAAF officer
- Ralph Michael as Sergeant Jimmy
- Johnnie Schofield as Bert the bartender

== Critical reception ==
The Monthly Film Bulletin wrote: "Direction, acting and photography are all excellent, but the film is not true cinema as it is practically all talk and no action. Though the film is welcome in that it has a worthwhile motive, it gives little help as to how Utopia is to be achieved, apart from that most difficult of all things, universal friendship."

Kine Weekly wrote: "Intelligently and artistically presented, competently acted and, within its bounds, elaborately staged, it is, nevertheless, no paltry pictorial pamphleteering. ...The tale cross-sections humanity effectively, but by leaving everything to talk – the workings of the brave new halcyon administration, which roughly repudiates what the author bitingly describes as 'the dogfight round a dustbin" life followed by most societies, are never witnessed – and displaying obvious political bias, it becomes a task rather than a diversion. J. B. Priestley tells the story, re-winds it in the middle and figures prominently at the fadeout, but the personal touch, at once both agreeable and formidable, fails adequately to compensate for its lack of movement."

In The New York Times, Bosley Crowther wrote, "as symbolism and an outlet for Priestley's philosophy, They Came to a City is eloquent and courageous, but as a motion picture it is immobile."

In British Sound Films: The Studio Years 1928–1959 David Quinlan rated the film as "average", writing: "Uncinematic conversion of play; not box-office either."

Leslie Halliwell said: "Good talk and good acting, but not quite cinema."
