= Collision (1932 film) =

1932 British film by G. B. Samuelson

- Feature on the film in Picture Show (23 July 1932)
- Directed by: G. B. Samuelson
- Written by: E. C. Pollard (play)
- Produced by: E. Gordon Craig
- Starring: Sunday Wilshin; Henrietta Watson
- Cinematography: Basil Emmott
- Production company: G. B. Samuelson Productions
- Distributed by: United Artists
- Release date: 1932
- Running time: 88 minutes
- Country: United Kingdom
- Language: English

Collision is a 1932 British crime film directed by G. B. Samuelson and starring Sunday Wilshin and Henrietta Watson. It was written by E.C. Pollard.

== Preservation status ==
The British Film Institute National Archive holds a collection of stills but no film or video materials.

== Plot ==
Mr Carruthers is on holiday on the Riviera, with his wife and son Jack. He becomes infatuated with Mrs. Oliver, an adventuress, who is posing as a widow. At Jack's girlfriend's sister's wedding reception a valuable necklace is stolen in circumstances which incriminate Jack. Certain that Mrs Oliver is the culprit, not her son, Mrs Carruthers visits her and extracts a confession, and also cures Mr Carruthers of his infatuation.

== Cast ==
- Sunday Wilshin as Mrs. Oliver
- Henrietta Watson as Mrs. Carruthers
- L. Tippett as Mr. Carruthers
- A. G. Poulton as Mr. Maynard
- Irene Rooke as Mrs. Maynard
- Gerald Rawlinson as Jack Carruthers
- Peter Coleman as Brabazon
- Wendy Barrie as Joyce Maynard

== Reception ==
Film Weekly wrote: "'The snail-like progress of the story causes more atrophy of interest thanthe awkward dramatic scenes in which the lady's schemes are thwarted, for these are at least unintentionally amusing. Sunday Wilshin is wasted as the lady crook, for she acts well enough to deserve a better 'break.' Gerald Rawlinson is attractive as one of her victims, but the rest of the cast find the story too much for them. An incompetent, shoddy, and dull 'quota' picture."

Kine Weekly wrote: "Slow, listless unimaginative direction and a welter of idle words lessen the dramatic possibilities of this crime play, the theme of which has some claim to ingenuity. From the opening to the close the picture proceeds on its weary way without having any direct effect upon the emotions. Until the scissors have been drastically used and speeding-up has been effected, this effort cannot be recommended with any confidence."

Picturegoer wrote: "A wordy and slowly developed story which fails to intrigue the imagination. The sequence of events is obvious and unnecessary explanation makes it tedious."
