= Roy Stewart =

British actor (1925–2008)

- Stewart as Toberman in Doctor Who:The Tomb of the Cybermen (1967)
- Born: Atwell Roy Stewart; 15 May 1925; Colony of Jamaica, British Empire
- Died: 27 October 2008 (aged 83); London, England
- Occupation: actor
- Years active: 1959–1981
- Known for: The Tomb of the Cybermen; Live and Let Die; Terror of the Autons; Twins of Evil; Arabian Adventure

Roy Stewart (15 May 1925 – 27 October 2008) was a Jamaican-born British actor. He began his career as a stuntman and went on to work in film and television.

In 1954 he founded Roy Stewart's Gym in Powis Square, North Kensington, and ran the Caribbean club and restaurant The Globe, in Talbot Road until his death. Stewart played Quarrel Junior in the James Bond film Live and Let Die (1973). Other film appearances include Carry On Up the Jungle (1970), Leo the Last (1970), Games That Lovers Play (1971), Twins of Evil (1971), Lady Caroline Lamb (1972), Stand Up, Virgin Soldiers (1977) and Arabian Adventure (1979). He was also active on television, with credits including: Out of the Unknown, Adam Adamant Lives!, Doctor Who (in the serials The Tomb of the Cybermen and Terror of the Autons), Doomwatch, Up Pompeii!, The Troubleshooters, Space: 1999 and I, Claudius.

== Early life ==
One of seven brothers, Roy Stewart was born in Jamaica, and came to Britain in 1948 with aspirations of being a doctor. But either theatre or a television commercial changed that.

== Film and television career ==
In a role, possibly his earliest, Stewart appeared in a television advert for Fry's Turkish Delight, playing a snake charmer. Later, he was an extra in films and did stunt work. He would become one of the top black actors and stuntmen in Britain.

=== Film ===
Possibly his earliest role was an uncredited one, playing a slave in the 1959 film, The Mummy. In 1973, he played the part of Quarrel Junior in the James Bond film Live and Let Die starring Roger Moore. Having not returned for many years to Jamaica where the film was being shot, Stewart suffered in the heat and couldn't believe the changes that had taken place over the years.

One of his last roles in film was as Pomeroy in Dangerous Davies: The Last Detective, a 1981 made-for-television movie.

=== Television ===
He appeared in Doctor Who twice. He played Toberman in The Tomb of the Cybermen and Tony in Terror of the Autons.

=== Television commercials ===
- Fry's Turkish Delight
- Surf washing powder

== Business interests ==
Stewart ran a basement gymnasium at 32A Powis Square, Kensington, west London which was opened in 1954. It had the policy of allowing all races to train there. Some actors trained there too, one of them, David Prowse, a Commonwealth Games weightlifter in 1962, went on to play Darth Vader in the film Star Wars. The Gymnasium had a dual purpose. It was also an unofficial after-hours drinking club. By 1964, Stewart had been convicted four times for selling liquor without a licence. He also ran a nightclub in Bayswater. Jimi Hendrix, Van Morrison and Bob Marley were some of the patrons.

=== The Globe ===
In the 1960s he opened a Caribbean restaurant and bar called The Globe. The Globe, formerly Bajy's, was located at 103 Talbot Road. Jimi Hendrix was reportedly seen there the night before his death in September 1970. Stewart ran The Globe until he died in October 2008. The Globe functions to this day and is one of longest-running nightclubs in London. It also has a Caribbean restaurant upstairs.

== Death ==
Having suffered for some time from heart disease, Stewart died on 27 October 2008, aged 83.

== Filmography ==
Year	Title	Role	Notes
1959	The Mummy	Flashback Slave	Uncredited
1960	Sands of the Desert	Gong Banger at Sheik's Tent	Uncredited
1961	On the Fiddle	Trinidad	Uncredited
1964	The Curse of the Mummy's Tomb	Bearer in Museum	Uncredited
1965; 1967; 1971	Doctor Who	Saracen Warrior; Toberman; Tony the Strongman	The Crusade; The Tomb of the Cybermen; Terror of the Autons
1965	She	Black Guard	Uncredited
1965	Out of the Unknown	Security Guard	Episode: No Place Like Earth
1966	The Saint	Wrestler	Uncredited
1967	Prehistoric Women	Warrior	Uncredited
1968	Sympathy for the Devil	Black Power Activist	
1968	The Avengers	Giles	Episode: Have Guns - Will Haggle
1970	Julius Caesar	Slave	
1970	Carry On Up the Jungle	Nosha	Uncredited
1970	Leo the Last	Jasper's Bodyguard	
1970	Up Pompeii!	Jeremy	Episode: Guess Who's Coming to Sin'Er Nymphia
1971	Games That Lovers Play	Mr. Bwamba	
1971	Twins of Evil	Joachim	
1972	Call Me by My Rightful Name	Doug's Agent	
1972	Lady Caroline Lamb	Black Pug	
1973	Live and Let Die	Quarrel Jr.	
1976	I, Claudius	Sentor	Miniseries
1977	Stand Up, Virgin Soldiers	American Sailor	
1979	Arabian Adventure	Nubian	
1981	Dangerous Davies: The Last Detective	Pomeroy	TV movie (final film role)
