= Henrietta Watson =

Scottish actress (1873–1964)

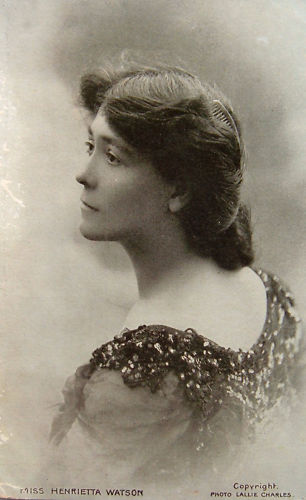
- Henrietta Watson
- Born: 11 March 1873; Dundee, Scotland
- Died: 29 September 1964 (aged 91)
- Occupation: Actress

Henrietta Watson (11 March 1873 – 29 September 1964) was a Scottish actress. She was born in Dundee, Scotland, on 11 March 1873, into a theatrical family. Her maternal grandfather was actor J.B. Johnston, whom Edmund Yates considered to be “the most sterling actor on the English stage.” After the death of her father she went onto the stage, as did most of her four brothers and two sisters.

== Career ==
She first appeared on stage at the age of seven as the "son" of Lady Isabel Carlyle in East Lynne, a play adapted from the 1861 novel by Ellen Wood of the same name. By the time she turned 16 she was experienced enough to take "second lead" in comedies and modern dramas. As she grew older, she was given larger parts and was sometimes the understudy of the leading lady.

She toured Britain for a year as the ingénue in the comedy farce Our Flat. One of her more emotionally demanding roles was playing Nellie Denver in The Silver King. She was playing the part of Stephanie in A Royal Divorce at the new Olympic Theatre, London, when she was offered a six-month engagement in Australia.

She toured Australia in 1892, with the Mrs. Bernard Beere Company, appearing in, “As in a Looking Glass.” When the company returned to Britain she was offered a three-month extension during which she appeared in The Lost Paradise. She also appeared as "Kate" in The Churchwarden, a three-act farce, at the Princess Theatre (Melbourne), in 1893.

She visited Australia again, in 1899, when she appeared as Countess de Winter in “The King’s Musketeers.”

== Selected filmography ==
=== Film ===
Year	Title	Role	Ref.
1916	Driven	Lady Crichton	
1918	The Divine Gift	The Hostess	
1924	Miriam Rozella	Lady Laverock	
1924	Reveille	Mother	
1931	Creeping Shadows	Lady Paget	
1931	Jealousy	Mrs Delahunt	
1932	Collision	Mrs Carruthers	
1933	A Shot in the Dark	Angela Browne	
1933	The Pointing Finger	Lady Anne Rollestone	
1935	Things Are Looking Up	Miss McTavish	
1935	Barnacle Bill	Aunt Julia	
1935	The Guv'nor	Mrs Granville	
1936	The Cardinal	Donna Claricia de' Medici	
1936	The Brown Wallet	Aunt Mary	
1939	The Four Just Men	Mrs Truscott	
