= Julia Misbehaves =

1948 film

- Theatrical poster
- Directed by: Jack Conway
- Screenplay by: William Ludwig; Harry Ruskin; Arthur Wimperis
- Adaptation by: Monckton Hoffe; Gina Kaus
- Based on: The Nutmeg Tree; 1937 novel by Margery Sharp
- Produced by: Everett Riskin
- Starring: Greer Garson; Walter Pidgeon
- Cinematography: Joseph Ruttenberg
- Edited by: John D. Dunning
- Music by: Adolph Deutsch
- Distributed by: Metro-Goldwyn-Mayer
- Release date: August 8, 1948
- Running time: 99 minutes
- Country: United States
- Language: English
- Budget: $2,706,000
- Box office: $4,497,000

Julia Misbehaves is a 1948 American romantic comedy film starring Greer Garson and Walter Pidgeon as a married couple who are separated by the man's snobbish family. They meet again many years later, when the daughter whom the man has raised, played by Elizabeth Taylor, invites her mother to her wedding. The film also features Peter Lawford and Cesar Romero.

This adaptation of Margery Sharp's 1937 novel The Nutmeg Tree, which was also the basis of the 1940 Broadway play Lady in Waiting, was director Jack Conway's final film.

== Plot ==
In 1936 London, mature showgirl Julia Packett leads a precarious life. She pretends to be contemplating suicide in order to finagle some money out of a male friend in order to pay her bills. Then she receives a wedding invitation from her daughter Susan. As a young woman, Julia had married wealthy William Packett. However, after 14 months of marriage, his disapproving mother broke them up. Julia returned to show business but left her infant daughter with William so that the child could be raised in a safe environment.

On the boat trip to France, Julia meets and falls for muscular acrobat Fred Ghenoccio, and when in Paris, she performs with his troupe with great success. Later, Fred proposes to her as her train pulls away from the station.

Julia reaches her destination penniless, so following her usual methods, she convinces a stranger, Colonel Willowbrook, to give her money, supposedly for an evening gown and other clothing. However, she sneaks away before Willowbrook tries to become better acquainted with her.

Her mother-in-law is less than pleased to see her, but Julia manages to see Susan, who insists that Julia stay. As time goes by, William's love for Julia resurfaces. Julia observes that Susan has strong feelings for lovestruck painter Ritchie Lorgan, though he is not her fiancé. Though Susan claims to be merely annoyed, Julia sees that Susan loves Ritchie and successfully brings the two together.

Julia remains skeptical of William's newfound love, unable to forget the past. Complications arise when Fred shows up to claim her. However, when William encounters his old friend Colonel Willowbrook, he learns of Julia's affair with Fred. William persuades Willowbrook to pretend to not know him and to interrupt their breakfast. The revelation of Julia's questionable method of raising funds sends Fred packing.

Eventually, Susan takes Julia's suggestion and elopes with Ritchie. When William chases after them, followed by Julia, they discover that they have been tricked into going to the wrong place. Following Susan's instructions, servants drive away their cars, leaving them stranded for 48 hours in their isolated honeymoon cabin. Julia tries to walk away in a rainstorm, but ends up in the mud. When William comes to her rescue, he ends up sprawled in the muck as well, leaving them both laughing at their predicament.

== Cast ==
- Greer Garson as Julia Packett
- Walter Pidgeon as William Sylvester Packett
- Peter Lawford as Ritchie Lorgan
- Elizabeth Taylor as Susan Packett
- Cesar Romero as Fred Ghenoccio
- Lucile Watson as Mrs. Packett
- Nigel Bruce as Colonel Bruce "Bunny" Willowbrook
- Mary Boland as Ma Gheneccio
- Reginald Owen as Benjamin Hawkins, Julia's friend
- Henry Stephenson as Lord Pennystone, Susan's future father-in-law
- Aubrey Mather as the Vicar
- Ian Wolfe as Hobson, the butler
- Fritz Feld as Pepito
- Phyllis Morris as Daisy
- Veda Ann Borg as Louise
- Harry Allen as bill collector (uncredited)
- Edmund Breon as Jaime (uncredited)

Cast notes

- Elizabeth Taylor turned 16 during the filming of Julia Misbehaves and also received her first onscreen kiss, from Peter Lawford. Taylor had a crush on Lawford and pursued him, but he had been warned that she was off-limits and told her that there was no chance of a romance between them. Taylor stayed in bed for days until a visit from Lawford smoothed things out, and they remained friends.
- During filming, Lawford introduced Greer Garson to E. E. "Buddy" Fogelson, an oil and cattle millionaire from Texas, whom she married the next year.
- Julia Misbehaves was the fifth of nine films in which Walter Pidgeon and Greer Garson co-starred.

The films in which they co-starred were:

1. Blossoms in the Dust (1941)
2. Mrs. Miniver (1942)
3. Madame Curie (1943)
4. The Youngest Profession (1943), cameo with Ms. Garson and Mr. Pidgeon
5. Mrs. Parkington (1944)
6. Julia Misbehaves (1948)
7. That Forsyte Woman (1949)
8. The Miniver Story (1950)
9. Scandal at Scourie (1953)

== Production ==
Julia Misbehaves began with the working titles The Nutmeg Tree (the title of the 1937 novel by Margery Sharp upon which the film was based) and Speak to Me of Love. The screenplay was originally to have been written by James Hilton and would have starred Gracie Fields. Announced in April 1941, it was postponed later in the year because Fields was unavailable.

In 1946, the project was revived, with Greer Garson in the lead role and with Everett Riskin as the producer, replacing Dore Schary, who had replaced Sidney Franklin.

== Box office ==
The film earned $2,948,000 in the U.S. and Canada and $1,549,000 in other markets, resulting in a profit of $298,000.

== Critical reception ==
A New York Times review wrote that Garson was "out of her element" in the film, but a Variety reviewer said that she "acquits herself like a lady out to prove she can be hoydenish when necessary. She proves it and audiences will like the new Garson."
