= The Nutmeg Tree =

1937 novel

- First edition (US)
- Author: Margery Sharp
- Language: English
- Genre: Comedy
- Publisher: Arthur Barker Limited (UK); Grosset & Dunlap (U.S.)
- Publication date: 1937
- Publication place: United Kingdom
- Media type: Print

The Nutmeg Tree is a 1937 comedy novel by the British writer Margery Sharp, which was adapted as a play and a film. Julia an actress and showgirl is down on her luck in London when she receives an unexpected invitation to France. Many years before she had a daughter, but her father was killed in the First World War and the girl went to live with his wealthy relations. Now Julia is invited by her daughter to run her eye over a prospective fiance. After meeting him, Julia becomes convinced he is utterly unsuitable for her daughter, as he has a wild, reckless personality much closer to her own.

== Play ==
In 1940 it was turned by Sharp into a play, Lady in Waiting, that appeared at the Martin Beck Theatre on Broadway. In London's West End it ran under the name The Nutmeg Tree for 268 performances from October 1941 to May 1942, originally at the Lyric Theatre, then it transferred to St James's Theatre. The cast included Yvonne Arnaud, Frederick Leister, Helen Haye, Winifred Oughton and Maire O'Neill.

== Film adaptation ==
In 1948, it was adapted into the American film Julia Misbehaves, directed by Jack Conway and starring Greer Garson, Walter Pidgeon and Elizabeth Taylor.

== Bibliography ==
- Goble, Alan. The Complete Index to Literary Sources in Film. Walter de Gruyter, 1999.
- Wearing, J.P. The London Stage 1940-1949: A Calendar of Productions, Performers, and Personnel. Rowman & Littlefield, 2014.
