= Bernard the Brave =

Book by Margery Sharp

- First edition book cover
- Author: Margery Sharp
- Illustrator: Faith Jaques
- Language: English
- Series: The Rescuers
- Genre: Children's novel
- Publisher: Heinemann
- Publication date: 1977
- Publication place: United Kingdom
- Media type: Print (Hardback & Paperback)
- Pages: 108
- ISBN: 0-434-96306-2
- Preceded by: Miss Bianca and the Bridesmaid
- Followed by: Bernard into Battle

Bernard the Brave is a novel written by British novelist Margery Sharp. It is the eighth novel in a series of nine known collectively as The Rescuers which tells the story of two little mice, Bernard and Miss Bianca, and their adventures as members of the Mouse Prisoner's Aid Society, a mouse organization dedicated to cheering up and rescuing prisoners around the world.

== Plot summary ==
When Miss Bianca's owner, referred to as "The Boy," becomes sick and is taken to a mountain resort far from the city, where the fresh air will help him get over his illness. Miss Bianca must travel with him and leaves her house, known as the "Porcelain Pagoda," in the care of Bernard, whom she trusts with her life. Shortly after Miss Bianca leaves, Bernard is visited in his bachelor flat by an obnoxious old mouse named Nicodemus, who tells him that he is in a great predicament and hoped to find the legendary Miss Bianca to help him. The problem centers around his owner, an orphaned young lady named Miss Tomasina, who has been kidnapped by mountain bandits under the order of her legal guardian, and with only three days before she comes of age to claim her parents' properties as hers. Bernard decides to take the case, in the process gathering valuable clues and going through several mishaps, like being kept as a pet for a few minutes by a bunch of school girls and almost getting roasted alive by two housemaids. He also meets one of the most curious characters of the whole series, a stuffed bear named Algernon, who proves to be an invaluable ally for the future. Bernard and Algernon eventually travel to a desolate and perilous wasteland known as the "Wolf Range," where their clues had pointed that Miss Tomasina is being kept.

All this time, Miss Bianca daydreams about Bernard and wonders what he is up to. When she arrives home from the mountains, she realises that Bernard is nowhere to be found and worriedly runs to his flat to see if he is not terribly ill, ready to nurse him all night if necessary. Upon questioning Nicodemus and Bernard's neighbors, she hears all about Bernard's quest to rescue Miss Tomasina and really begins to worry about him. It is in this point of the series that readers realise just how important Bernard is to Miss Bianca, and is where she lets go of her formal self and gives in to her love for him, realizing that she just cannot live without Bernard. She refuses to eat or sleep, and becomes very taciturn, thinking of nothing except her dear Bernard, lost in some desolate corner of the Wolf Range, with only a stuffed toy to accompany him.

Meanwhile, Bernard and Algernon eventually find the bandits' hideout and rescue Miss Tomasina right on time. The legal guardian of Miss Tomasina dies from a heart attack in the middle of the court.

After all the adventure, Algernon finds a place with another stuffed bear named Nigel and form a stuffed toy club. Bernard returns to Miss Bianca and they sit beside the fountain in her courtyard, leading to one of the few but very touching moments in which Bernard and Miss Bianca's whiskers touch and they feel each other's love aglow. Miss Bianca asks Bernard to please come and live with her, for she feels that they have had enough adventure in their lifetime and wishes to settle down and retire. Bernard, however, has a different feeling. Something inside him tells him that there is still something he must do, one more adventure to live, which leads to the final part of the Rescuers series, Bernard into Battle. And with this scene, the story ends.
