= The Smugglers (1916 film) =

1916 film by Sidney Olcott

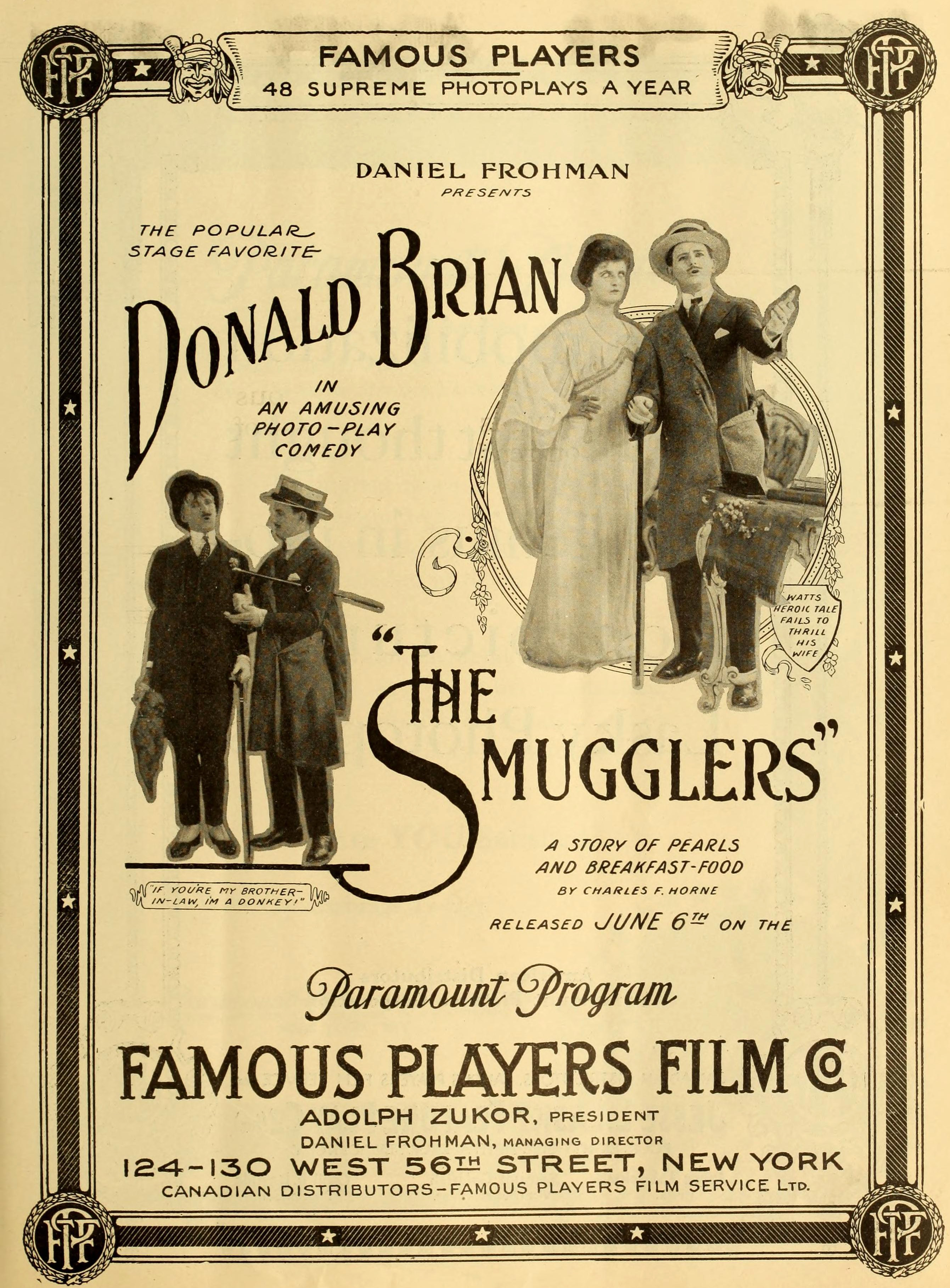
- Film advertisement
- Directed by: Sidney Olcott
- Written by: Charles F. Horne (Scenario)
- Produced by: Daniel Frohman
- Starring: Donald Brian
- Cinematography: Al Liguori
- Production company: Famous Players Film Company
- Distributed by: Paramount Pictures (as Famous Players–Lasky Corporation)
- Release date: April 16, 1916 (United States)
- Country: United States
- Language: Silent (English intertitles)

The Smugglers was 1916 American silent comedy film produced by Famous Players Film Company and distributed through Paramount Pictures. It was directed by Sidney Olcott and starred stage star Donald Brian in his second film. The film is now considered lost with only a fragment (part of reel 2) surviving at the Library of Congress.

== Cast ==
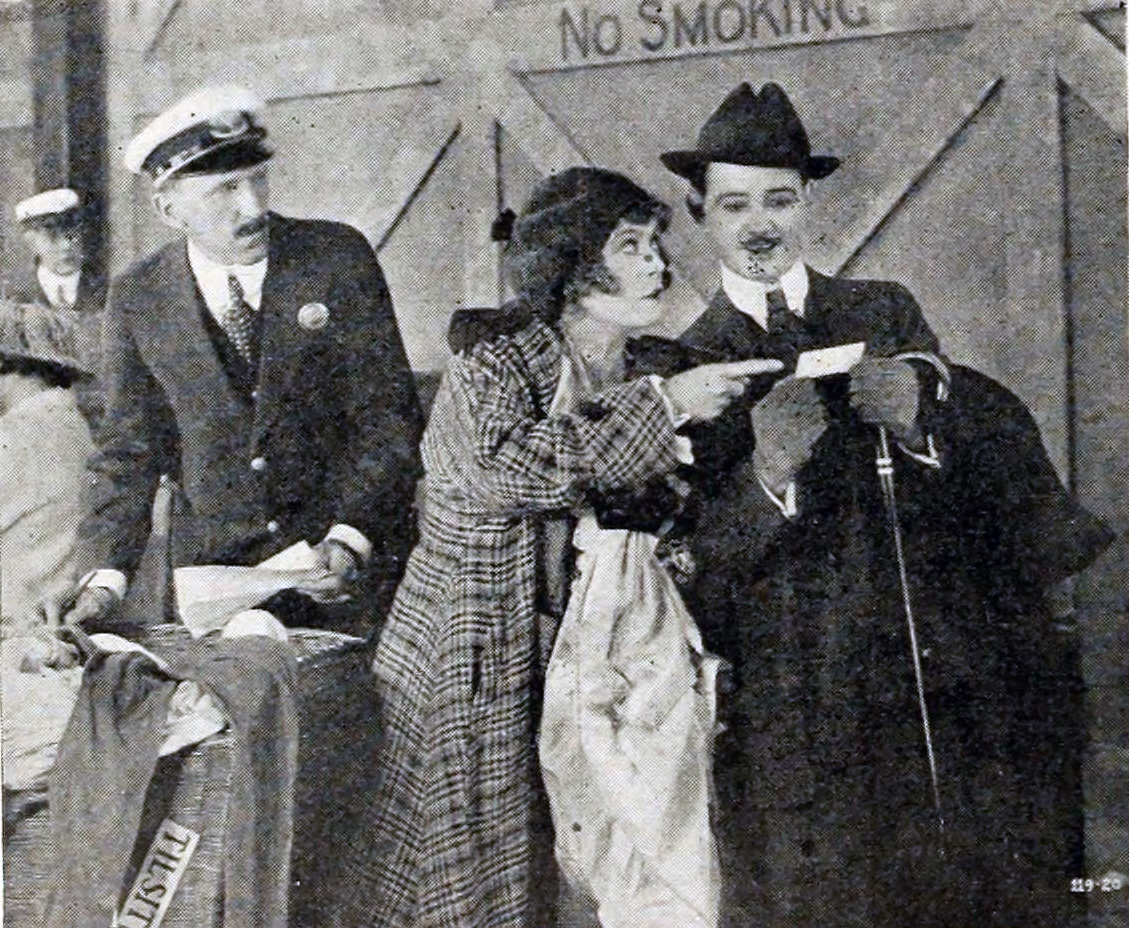
The Smugglers (1916)

- Donald Brian as John Battleby Watts
- Alma Tell as Mrs. Watts
- Cyril Chadwick as Brompton
- Margaret Greene as Mrs. Brompton
- Harold Vosburgh as Detective Gray
- Rita Bori as Sally Atkins
