= The Forbidden Street =

1949 film by Jean Negulesco

- 1949 US Theatrical Poster
- Directed by: Jean Negulesco
- Written by: Ring Lardner, Jr.
- Based on: Britannia Mews; 1946 novel by Margery Sharp
- Produced by: William Perlberg
- Starring: Dana Andrews; Maureen O'Hara; Sybil Thorndike
- Narrated by: Maureen O'Hara
- Cinematography: Georges Périnal
- Edited by: Richard Best; Robert L. Simpson
- Music by: Malcolm Arnold
- Distributed by: Twentieth Century Fox
- Release date: 31 March 1949
- Running time: 90 minutes
- Country: United Kingdom
- Language: English

The Forbidden Street is a 1949 British melodrama film directed by Jean Negulesco and starring Dana Andrews, Maureen O'Hara, Sybil Thorndike, Fay Compton and A. E. Matthews. Set in Victorian London, it tells the story of a wealthy young woman who marries a poor drunken artist and struggles to make ends meet; after his death, she takes in a lodger, with whom she falls in love. The film is based on the 1946 novel Britannia Mews by Margery Sharp.

== Plot ==
In late-1800s London, the well-to-do Adelaide (Maureen O'Hara), over the objections of her family, marries her drawing teacher, impoverished artist Henry Lambert (Dana Andrews), and moves into his flat in the run-down street Britannia Mews. Adelaide expects Henry to finish painting his masterpiece and blossom into a prominent artist, so that she can prove to her family that he did not seek to marry her for her money. However, Henry soon proves himself to be an alcoholic who is more interested in drinking and pursuing his hobby of making elaborate marionettes than in completing his paintings. Estranged from her family and running out of money, Adelaide finally confronts Henry, who reveals that he romanced most of his wealthy female art pupils and that he does not love her and simply acquiesced to her insistence that they marry. In the midst of a quarrel, Henry grabs at Adelaide, who pushes him away, causing the drunk and unsteady Henry to fatally fall down a flight of stairs.

Adelaide is then blackmailed by her neighbour, Mrs. Mounsey (Sybil Thorndike), a spiteful old hag who witnessed the couple's last argument. Mrs. Mounsey testifies that Henry fell accidentally, but demands that Adelaide give her regular payments, or else Mrs. Mounsey will change her story and claim that Adelaide pushed Henry to his death. Mrs. Mounsey also prevents Adelaide from departing Britannia Mews for her parents' country home. When Adelaide's mother tries to visit her daughter after several years with no contact, Mrs. Mounsey lies to her that Adelaide moved and her whereabouts are unknown.

Adelaide is resigned to her fate of being a virtual prisoner in Britannia Mews, when she meets a young barrister down on his luck, Gilbert Lauderdale (also played by Dana Andrews), who is the living image of Adelaide's late husband Henry. Unlike Henry, Gilbert develops a genuine affection for Adelaide, and gets rid of Mrs. Mounsey by threatening to prosecute her for blackmail. Unfortunately, Gilbert is already married to a wife who deserted him and moved to America, so he cannot marry Adelaide. The two of them nevertheless begin living together in her flat, calling themselves Mr. and Mrs. Lambert, although at Adelaide's insistence they sleep in separate rooms to avoid any sexual temptations.

Using the marionettes left behind by the late Henry, Gilbert and Adelaide launch a highly successful puppet theatre that eventually transforms Britannia Mews into a fashionable street and reunites Adelaide with her family. Then Gilbert's former wife Milly appears, having located Gilbert through an advertisement for the theatre. Milly is seeking a payoff from Gilbert for "wronging" her by moving in with another woman, but Adelaide insists that Gilbert return to his wife. Milly then reveals to Gilbert that she actually divorced him years ago and married another man, leaving Gilbert free to finally marry his true love Adelaide.

== Cast ==
- Dana Andrews as Henry Lambert / Gilbert Lauderdale
- Maureen O'Hara as Adelaide Culver
- Sybil Thorndike as Mrs. Mounsey
- Fay Compton as Mrs. Culver
- Anthony Tancred as Treff Culver
- Diane Hart as The Blazer
- Anne Butchart as Alice Hambro
- Wilfrid Hyde-White as Mr. Culver
- A. E. Matthews as Mr. Bly
- Mary Martlew as Milly Lauderdale

== Production notes ==
- 20th Century Fox bought Margery Sharp's novel in June 1946 for $150,000 plus bonus increments
- The film was shot in England using studio funds frozen in Great Britain.
- Production Dates: mid-July to mid-October 1948 at London Film Studios, Shepperton, England
- The working titles of this film were Britannia Mews and Impulse.
- The film was released in Great Britain as Britannia Mews and was originally scheduled to be released in the United States as Affairs of Adelaide.
