= Powis Square, London =

Garden square in Notting Hill, London, England

Coordinates: 51.5162°N 0.2012°W

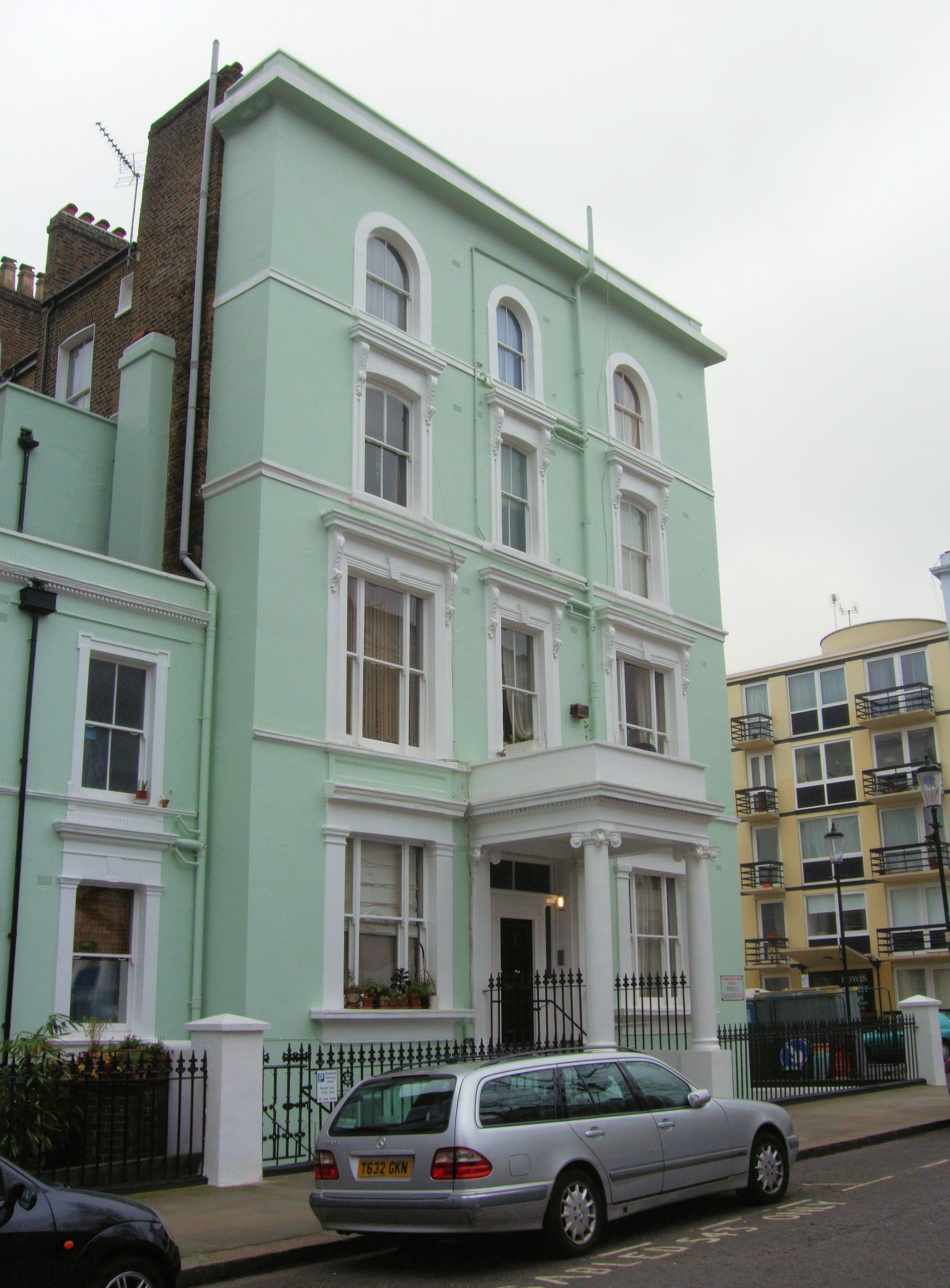
25 Powis Square, Notting Hill

Powis Square is a garden square and locality in Notting Hill, in the Royal Borough of Kensington and Chelsea in London, England.

== History ==
It was planned in the mid-19th century by noted local architect Thomas Allom. There is conflicting information as to whether the square was named, along with nearby Arundel Gardens and Talbot Road, after the Talbot family of the Earls of Shrewsbury, or after Powis Castle owing to the Welsh Marches origins of the land's leaseholder, W. K. Jenkins.

Originally built as upper-middle class residences, the area experienced dramatic social decline in the 20th century and was described as being "largely a slum area" by the 1930s. The square and surrounding areas were later exploited by the notorious slum landlord Peter Rachman who, in the 1950s and 60s, had acquired many properties on the square and in the surrounding area.

In 1968, Kensington and Chelsea Council bought the garden square after a series of 'break-ins' by activists campaigning for social change towards the end of slum-era Notting Hill. Today, Powis Square Gardens is now one of three publicly-accessible pocket parks in the Portobello Road area, along with Tavistock Gardens and Colville Square Gardens.

The Tabernacle, a local community arts centre with a long association with the Notting Hill Carnival, is located there, and the square itself features in the carnival.

Roy Stewart ran a basement gymnasium at 32A Powis Square, which was opened in 1954.

In 1962, The Rolling Stones' Brian Jones lived on the west side of the square.

25 Powis Square was used for exterior scenes in Nicolas Roeg's 1970 film Performance, starring James Fox and Mick Jagger. The square is also referenced in the 1985 song "E=MC²" by Big Audio Dynamite, which was partially inspired by the film.

Lemmy Kilmister made his debut as a bass player for Hawkwind at a free open air concert at a park on Powis Square in August 1971.

== Access ==
The closest London Underground station to the square is Westbourne Park tube station.
