= The Siren (musical) =

- Music: Leo Fall, Jerome Kern and various
- Lyrics: Harry B. Smith, Adrian Ross and various
- Book: Harry B. Smith
- Basis: Die Sirene, by Fall, Leo Stein and A. M. Willner
- Productions: 1911 Broadway

The Siren is a musical in three acts, adapted from the operetta Die Sirene, with music by Leo Fall and text by Leo Stein and A. M. Willner. This was first performed in Vienna on January 5, 1911.

The Siren was adapted into English by Harry B. Smith. In addition to Fall's score, it featuring songs by Jerome Kern and others, with additional lyrics Adrian Ross and others. It was first produced on Broadway by Charles Frohman at the Knickerbocker Theatre from August 28, 1911 to December 16 of the same year, playing for 116 performances. It was directed by Thomas Reynolds.

== Synopsis ==
Setting: Vienna

The police believe that a handsome marquis is writing satiric letters about the government. They hire a beautiful young woman to prove the case.

== Roles and original cast ==
- Armand, Marquis de Ravaillac – Donald Brian
- Lolotte – Julia Sanderson
- Baron Siegfried Bazilos – Frank Moulan
- Robertine – Veronique Banner
- Pepi – Sara Carr
- Grion – Gilbert Childs
- Alberta – Gene Cole
- Freda – Ethel Davis
- Magda – Louise Donovan
- Clarisse – Elizabeth Firth
- Mimi – Jane Hall
- Toni – Ethel Kelly
- Ladislas – Victor Le Roy
- Franzi – Helen May
- Frau Eisenbehr – Florence Morrison
- Malipote – F. Pope Stamper
- Hannibal Beckmesser – Will West
- Yvonne – Pauline Delorme
- Ninon – Beatrice D'Essling
- Justine – Clementine Dundas
- Suzanne – Moya Mannering

== Sources ==
- Bordman, Gerald. American Musical Theatre: A Chronicle (1978), Oxford University Press
