= Games That Lovers Play (film) =

1971 British film by Malcolm Leigh

- Promotional poster
- Directed by: Malcolm Leigh
- Written by: Malcolm Leigh
- Produced by: Judith Smith
- Starring: Joanna Lumley; Penny Brahms; Richard Wattis
- Cinematography: Ken Higgins
- Edited by: Peter Austen-Hunt
- Music by: David Lindup
- Production company: Border Film Productions
- Release date: 14 March 1971
- Running time: 95 minutes
- Country: United Kingdom
- Language: English

Games That Lovers Play (U.S. titles: Lady Chatterley Versus Fanny Hill and Lady Chatterley vs Fanny Hill) is a 1971 British comedy film written and directed by Malcolm Leigh and starring Joanna Lumley, Penny Brahms and Richard Wattis.

The US title and the names of the female lead characters reference the 1748 erotic novel Fanny Hill and D. H. Lawrence's 1928 novel Lady Chatterley's Lover, which had been the subject of a celebrated obscenity trial in 1960. The film's plot is unrelated to either novel.

== Plot ==
In 1920s London Lady Evelyn Chatterley and Mrs. Hill are brothel-keepers in competition to win a £1000 prize for keeping the best brothel. Their top girls, respectively Constance and Fanny, compete to seduce the unseductable, while Lady Evelyn and Mrs. Hill observe proceedings from behind a one-way mirror.

== Cast ==
- Joanna Lumley as Fanny Hill
- Penny Brahms as Constance Chatterley
- Richard Wattis as Lothran
- Jeremy Lloyd as Jonathan Chatterley
- Diane Hart as Mrs Hill
- Nan Munro as Lady Evelyn Chatterley
- John Gatrell as Bishop
- Charles Cullum as Charles
- Leigh Anthony as timekeeper
- George Belbin as Major Thrumper
- June Palmer as girl
- Graham Armitage as Mr Adams
- Harold Bennett as photographer
- Sydney Arnold as butler
- Colin Cunningham as usher
- Roy Stewart as Mr Bwamba
- Michael Travers as club porter
- Deborah Bishop as Lothran's fluffer

== Production ==
In 2018, Joanna Lumley revealed she felt pressured to strip for this movie.

== Critical reception ==
The Monthly Film Bulletin wrote: "Hardly a plea for sexual tolerance, this lightweight sex comedy derives its humour largely from double entendre and sexual deviations, notably transvestism. On the premise that if one man in drag is funny then forty will be hilarious, a Drag Ball is staged – to the detriment of Jeremy Lloyd who, unlike the other guests (played by authentic drag queens) merely looks like a man dressed up as a woman and can do nothing with a part that makes him a prude as well as a lecher. ...The sense of period, conscientiously attempted by means of every style of decor from antique to art nouveau, is broken by the contemporary look of the actors which adds a final veneer of unreality to an already vacuous story."

Kine Weekly wrote: "This is quite a bright, erotic plot for the permissive age: it is mildly amusing. ... Although the plot is exclusively about prostitution, it is dealt with in such a light, fanciful way that it gives no offence. The situations created by scriptwriter Malcolm Leigh have plenty of latent fun and even wit, though they are fairly obvious, but director Malcolm Leigh has failed to make the saucy stuff move and sparkle as it should and the result is likely to be smiles instead of chuckles and chuckles instead of laughs."

Variety wrote: "Malcolm Leigh's glib, saucy story has been directed by him with a tongue-in-cheek sexiness which provides a fair number of giggles for the not-over discriminating. ... Leigh has kept the pace of the picture pretty brisk though the writing is often fairly addled."
