= Who Is Sylvia? (play) =

Play by Terence Rattigan

Who Is Sylvia? is a 1950 comedy play by the British writer Terence Rattigan about a man obsessed with the image of a woman he met as a seventeen year old and his search for her throughout the rest of his life. The play offered a thinly veiled portrayal of Rattigan's own philandering father. Like Perchance to Dream, Ivor Novello's long-running musical terminating only two years previously, Rattigan chose a line from William Shakespeare for his title. The line is the first wistful question of a song passage in The Two Gentlemen of Verona.

== Original production ==
The play opened at the Criterion Theatre, London, on 24 October 1950, with the following cast:

- Mark - Robert Flemyng
- Williams - Esmond Knight
- Daphne - Diane Hart
- Sidney - Alan Woolston
- Ethel - Diana Allen
- Oscar - Roland Culver
- Bubbles - Diana Hope
- Nora, - Diane Hart
- Denis - David Aylmer
- Wilberforce - Roger Maxwell
- Doris - Diane Hart
- Chloe - Joan Benham
- Caroline - Athene Seyler

== Reception ==
Although it ran for over a year, it was not considered as successful as several of the playwright's previous works. This was especially so critically, with the Evening Standard's Beverley Baxter writing, "This Will Not Do, Mr Rattigan."

== Film adaptation ==
The play was adapted into a 1955 film The Man Who Loved Redheads.

== Bibliography ==
- David Pattie. Modern British Playwriting: The 1950s: Voices, Documents, New Interpretations. 2013.
