= British Actors Film Company =

British film production company

The British Actors Film Company was a British film production company that operated between 1916 and 1923 during the Silent era. It involved a consortium of prominent stage actors that included figures such as A.E. Matthews and Leslie Howard. The actors often exchanged their salaries for a share of the profits. Many of its films were made at Bushey Studios to the north of London.

The company's first films were released from 1916 onwards and it recruited prominent film figures such as the director Thomas Bentley who had developed a reputation with the rival Hepworth Company. Following the end of the First World War in 1918, the company had ambitious plans but its reputation was badly dented by a protracted legal case surrounding a 1919 film The Lackey and the Lady which had been rejected by its distributor as being of too poor quality. The company began to struggle, and by 1923 its production side had been swallowed up by the larger Alliance Film Company.

== Selected films ==
- The Real Thing at Last (1916)
- The Lifeguardsman (1916)
- The Labour Leader (1917)
- Daddy (1917)
- Once Upon a Time (1918)
- The Divine Gift (1918)
- The Lackey and the Lady (1919)
- The Lady Clare (1919)
- The Face at the Window (1920)
- The Temptation of Carlton Earle (1923)

== Bibliography ==
- Low, Rachael. History of the British Film, 1918-1929. George Allen & Unwin, 1971.
- Warren, Patricia. British Film Studios: An Illustrated History. Batsford, 2001.
