= Penny Brahms =

British actress (born 1951)

- Born: 1951 (age 74–75); Hampstead, London, England, UK
- Occupations: Actress, model
- Years active: 1966–1972 (film and TV)

Penny Brahms (born Penelope K. Brams in 1951) is a British model and film and television actress whose career was active in the 1960s and 1970s. She co-starred with Joanna Lumley in the 1971 sex comedy Games That Lovers Play.

She was married to the advertising man and author Jeremy Scott, who died in April 2026.

== Selected filmography ==
- At Last the 1948 Show (TV) 1967 – chorus girl
- The Wrong Box (1966) – Twittering Female on Moors (uncredited)
- The Ambushers (1967) – Slaygirl
- Hammerhead (1968) – Frieda
- 2001: A Space Odyssey (1968) – Stewardess #1
- Up Pompeii! (1970, Se1, Ep1).
- The Private Life of Sherlock Holmes (1970) – Girl (uncredited)
- She'll Follow You Anywhere (1971) – Mary Cawfield
- Games That Lovers Play (1971) – Constance
- Percy (1971) – Football Fan (uncredited)
- Bread (1971) – Jan
- Dracula A.D. 1972 (1972) – Hippy Girl (final film role)

== Bibliography ==
- James L. Limbacher. Sexuality in world cinema, Volume 2. Scarecrow Press, 1983.
