= A. E. Matthews =

English actor (1869–1960)

A. E. Matthews OBE
- Born: Alfred Edward Matthews; 22 November 1869; Bridlington, East Riding of Yorkshire, England
- Died: 25 July 1960 (aged 90); Bushey Heath, Hertfordshire, England
- Other name: Matty (nicknamed)
- Occupation: Actor
- Years active: 1900–1960

Alfred Edward Matthews (22 November 1869 – 25 July 1960), known as A. E. Matthews, was an English actor who played numerous character roles on the stage and in film for eight decades. Already middle-aged when films began production, he enjoyed increasing renown from World War II onwards as one of the British cinema's most famous crotchety, and sometimes rascally, old men.

== Early life ==
Matthews was born in Bridlington, East Riding of Yorkshire, England. Nicknamed "Matty", he was christened Alfred Edward Matthews.

He married actress May Blayney, best known for her role as Julie Alardy in Monckton Hoffe's The Little Damozel. The couple had three children, a girl and twin boys.

== Career ==
A prominent stage actor by his mid-40s, Matthews was among several theatre figures who then began a film career during the silent era with the British Actors Film Company, a production company that operated between 1916 and 1923.

Matthews toured during World War II in The First Mrs. Fraser, with Marie Tempest and Barry Morse, and was later cast in the extremely popular films Carry On Admiral, Doctor at Large and Around the World in 80 Days, in which he played a mainstay of the Reform Club.

Matthews's other best-known films include The Life and Death of Colonel Blimp, The Million Pound Note (with Gregory Peck), Inn for Trouble, The Magic Box, The Ghosts of Berkeley Square and Just William's Luck.

In 1951 Matthews was made an Officer of the Order of the British Empire by King George VI, and on 15 August 1951 when aged 81 he was interviewed by Roy Plomley as the guest "castaway" on BBC Radio's long-running Desert Island Discs programme. He was Roy Plomley's 100th castaway.

In his later years, his memory began to decline. Ronald Neame, who directed him in The Million Pound Note (1954) made sure to shoot all his scenes in the mornings because he became confused and forgetful in the afternoons.

In his 89th year, Matthews made national headlines by sitting for several days and nights on the pavement outside his beautiful Georgian home in Bushey Heath near London, his purpose being to prevent the council from installing a new streetlight, the design of which he felt was totally out of keeping with the neighbourhood and which badly needed improvement. Spike Milligan penned an episode of The Goon Show entitled "The Evils of Bushey Spon" based on the incident. The programme, first broadcast on 17 March 1958, included a guest appearance by Matthews himself at the end of the episode, and this part of the show was ad-libbed as Milligan knew Matthews had never used a script in his life, and wrote blank lines for him. Much laughter was obtained by the larking around of the Goons interaction with their guest.

Shortly afterwards, on 5 May 1958, Matthews appeared on the live BBC TV programme This Is Your Life, a notable feature of which occurred at the end when he was faded out just as he began to speak directly to the television theatre audience. Having regaled audience and viewers throughout the show with highly engaging reminiscences, there were many press and public complaints to the BBC about the fade out. Host Eamonn Andrews recalled in his autobiography that "Matty had been a bit of a hellion all his life, a loveable, unpredictable rebel whose sense of fun was monumental. I knew I had a tough assignment on my hands once the decision was made to present his 'life'. On transmission, he did just about every solitary thing calculated to wreck the show's intricate timing and drive me up the drapes. He snorted, contradicted, interrupted, laughed, and, at one stage, even stretched out on the couch and said he was going to have a snooze.". On the following day, the Yorkshire Post declared that "There has never been a This Is Your Life quite like it", and a Daily Express article titled "Mattie's BBC Fade-Out Angers Viewers" wrote that "This was THE life of the whole series."

Matthews was still working as an actor right up until his death two years later. He died on 25 July 1960 in Bushey Heath, Hertfordshire, aged 90. A blue plaque is displayed on his former home at 38 Little Bushey Lane, WD23 4RN.

In 2008 Greg Knight, the Member of Parliament for the East Riding of Yorkshire constituency, (which includes Matthews's birthplace, Bridlington), launched a successful campaign to have his birthplace recognised with a blue plaque. A special ceremony to commemorate his life and career was held in the town on 22 November 2008, organised and compered by Knight. It was attended by the ventriloquist Ray Alan, who knew Matthews and who spoke about his memories of him.

== Filmography ==
- A Highwayman's Honour (1914 short)
- Wanted: A Widow (1916 short)
- The Real Thing at Last (1916 short) as Murdered
- The Lifeguardsman (1916) as Lt. Tosh
- Once Upon a Time (1918) as Guy Travers
- The Lackey and the Lady (1919)
- Castle of Dreams (1919) as Gerald Sumner
- The Iron Duke (1934) as Lord Hill
- Men Are Not Gods (1936) as Frederick Skeates
- Quiet Wedding (1941) as Arthur Royd
- This England (1941)
- "Pimpernel" Smith (1941) as Earl of Meadowbrook
- The Great Mr. Handel (1942) as Charles Jennens
- Thunder Rock (1942) as Mr. Kirby
- The Life and Death of Colonel Blimp (1943) as President of Tribunal
- The Man in Grey (1943) as Auctioneer
- Escape to Danger (1943) as Sir Thomas Leighton
- They Came to a City (1944) as Sir George Gedney
- The Way Ahead (1944) as Colonel Walmsley
- Love Story (1944) as Col. Pitt Smith
- Twilight Hour (1945) as General Fitzhenry
- Flight from Folly (1945) as Neville
- Piccadilly Incident (1946) as Sir Charles Pearson
- The Ghosts of Berkeley Square (1947) as Gen. Bristow
- Just William's Luck (1947) as The Tramp
- William Comes to Town (1948) as Minister for Economic Affairs
- Edward, My Son (1949) as Lord George Trelby
- The Forbidden Street (1949) as Mr. Bly
- Whisky Galore! (1949) as Colonel Linsey-Woolsey
- The Chiltern Hundreds (1949) as Lord Lister
- Landfall (1949) as Air Raid Warden
- Mr Drake's Duck (1951) as Brig. Matthews
- The Galloping Major (1951) as Sir Robert Medleigh
- Laughter in Paradise (1951) as Sir Charles Robson
- The Magic Box (1951) as Old Gentleman
- Castle in the Air (1952) as Blair
- Who Goes There! (1952) as Sir Arthur Cornwall
- Something Money Can't Buy (1952) as Lord Haverstock
- Penny Princess (1952) as Selby
- Made in Heaven (1952) as Hillary Topham
- Meet Mr. Lucifer (1953) as Himself
- Skid Kids (1953) as Man in Taxi
- The Million Pound Note (1954) as Duke of Frognal
- The Weak and the Wicked (1954) as Harry Wicks, Mabel's beau
- Happy Ever After (1954) as General O'Leary
- Aunt Clara (1954) as Simon Hilton
- Miss Tulip Stays the Night (1955) as Mr. Potts
- Jumping for Joy (1956) as Lord Reginald Cranfield
- Loser Takes All (1956) as Elderly Man in Casino
- Around the World in 80 Days (1956) as Reform Club member
- Three Men in a Boat (1956) as Crabtree, 1st Old Gentleman
- The Square (1957 short)
- Doctor at Large (1957) as Duke of Skye and Lewes
- Carry On Admiral (1957) as Adm. Sir Maximillian Godfrey, K.C.B.
- The Royalty (1957) (BBC TV series)
  – Episode 1 as Lord Charters
- The Sky Larks (1958) (BBC TV series)
  – Episode 9: "Find the Lady" as Vice Adml. Sir Geoffrey Wiggin-Fanshawe
- How Say You? (1959) (BBC TV drama) as Mr. Peebles
- Inn for Trouble (1960) as Sir Hector Gore-Blandish (final film role)

== Selected stage appearances ==
- Lady Huntworth's Experiment by R.C. Carton (1900)
- Peg o' My Heart by J. Hartley Manners (1916)
- Bulldog Drummond by Gerald du Maurier (1921)
- The Happy Husband by Harrison Owen (1927)
- Spring Meeting by Molly Keane (1938)
- They Came to a City by J.B. Priestley (1943)
- But for the Grace of God by Frederick Lonsdale (1946)
- The Chiltern Hundreds by William Douglas Home (1947)
- The Manor of Northstead by William Douglas Home (1954)
