= H. M. Brock =

English painter

H. M. Brock in 1926

Henry Matthew Brock (11 July 1875 – 21 July 1960) was a British illustrator and landscape painter of the late nineteenth and early twentieth century. He was one of four artist brothers, all of them illustrators, who worked together in their family studio in Cambridge.

== Biography ==
Born in Cambridge in England, H. M. Brock was one of four sons of Edmund Brock (1841–1921), a specialist reader in oriental languages for the Cambridge University Press, and his wife Mary Ann Louise (1836–1901) (née Peagram). H. M. Brock was the younger brother of the better-known artist Charles Edmund Brock, with whom he shared a studio from 1894. H. M. Brock studied at the Cambridge School of Art. Like his brother, he contributed to Punch magazine.

While Charles Edward Brock painted in oils and was elected a member of the British Institution, H. M. Brock worked in advertising as well as in book illustration. For example, he illustrated Charles Dickens' Great Expectations, and produced four colour plates for a 1935 edition of A Christmas Carol. In addition, Brock was one of two artists (the other being Joseph Simpson) who contributed illustrations to Arthur Conan Doyle's 1911 Sherlock Holmes story, "The Adventure of the Red Circle". H.M. Brock provided illustrations for Susan Coolidge's What Katy Did at Home and at School (Seely and Co., 1911). He illustrated several books for T. N. Foulis. Brock was a frequent exhibitor. (Note: Brock exhibited as follows: five works at the Royal Birmingham Society of Artists, four works at the Glasgow Institute of the Fine Arts, 16 works at the Walker Art Gallery, Liverpool, 12 works at the Royal Academy, 48 works at the Royal Institute of Painters in Water Colours, and three works at the Royal Scottish Academy.)

Most of Brock's illustrations were for classic Victorian and Edwardian fiction. He also did a great deal of work for the D'Oyly Carte Opera Company for whom he produced posters and other advertising materials. During his artistic career, H. M. Brock regularly exhibited his drawings and watercolours at the Royal Academy and the Walker Art Gallery in Liverpool. He became a full member of the Royal Institute of Painters in Watercolours in 1907, and joined the newly formed Society of Graphic Art in 1921.

From the 1930s on he worked in comics, drawing "The Mystery of Study 13" for Sparkler (1937), "Breed of the Brudenells" for Knockout (1949), and an adaptation of Lorna Doone for Princess (1960).

On 7 September 1912 at Hampstead Brock married his cousin, Doris Joan Pegram, the daughter of the sculptor Henry Alfred Pegram, brother of the illustrator Fred Pegram. H. M. Brock died in the Evelyn Nursing Home in Cambridge in July 1960 aged 85. In his will he left £7,961 13s. 5d. to his widow, Doris Joan Brock.

The University of Reading has an H. M. Brock Collection, which is made up of some 2000 books in which Brock's work was published, many periodical volumes and parts, ephemera such as cigarette cards, and pictures, including over 70 original drawings.

== Gallery ==
H. M. Brock's 1919 poster for The Sorcerer

Illustration of the ghost scene from Ruddigore (1921)
