= The Lost Leader =

The Lost Leader may refer to:

- The Lost Leader (poem), an 1845 poem by Robert Browning
- The Lost Leader (radio play), a 1934 Australian radio drama
- The Lost Leader, a 2008 collection of poetry by Mick Imlah
- The Lost Leader, a 1918 play by Lennox Robinson

== See also ==
- A Lost Leader (disambiguation)
