= A Lost Leader =

A Lost Leader may refer to:

- A Lost Leader (novel), a 1906 novel by E. Phillips Oppenheim
  - A Lost Leader (film), a 1922 film directed by George Ridgwell, based on the novel
