= The Brocks of Cambridge =

English family of artists in Cambridge

The Brocks were a family of artists in Cambridge at the end of the Victorian Era, throughout the Edwardian era and the Interwar period. The four brothers were professional painters and illustrators. Two brothers (Charles Edmund and Henry Matthew) gained a large reputation with their illustrations for the works of Jane Austen and other English classics. One brother secured an honours degree in mathematics, a huge achievement at the time for someone from a lower-middle-class background. The three sisters had a much lower profile, in accordance with the social norms of the time. At least one of the sisters was a capable artist and poet, but it is not clear to what extent she earned her living from her art. The biographer of the family, Clifford Michael Kelly, started out with the intention of writing just about Charles and Henry, the most famous of them, but realised that all the siblings worked together and supported each other. (Note: However, he mentions Alice only in passing, leaves her out in his count of brothers and sisters, ignores Bertha, and makes only a few references to Katherine.)

== The parents ==
Edmund Brock (third quarter of 1840 – 3 April 1921) is listed in the 1861 census as a bootmaker, boarding with Henry Stone, a bootmaker with three employees, in Islington, London. Edmund married Mary Ann Louise Pegram (1835 – third quarter 1912) at Regent's Park Chapel on 23 February 1867. She was the daughter of Thomas Weeley (Note: This is sometimes given as Wesley, but a number of primary sources and Kelly give it as Weeley.) Pegram (c. 1811 – fourth quarter of 1893), whom the census report to have the occupation of barrister's clerk in 1851, a photographic artist in 1861, and a photographer in 1871. The Pegams were an artistic family, and one of Mary Ann's nephews was the sculptor Henry Alfred Pegram RA (27 July 1862 – 25 March 1937). The illustrator Fred Pegram RI (19 December 1870 – 23 August 1937), and his brother, the sculptor and medallist Alfred Bertram Pegram (17 January 1873 – 14 January 1941) were also her nephews.

Edmund Brock must have been very able, as by the mid-1860s he was a member of the Early English Text Society, and was publishing his own work with the Society. The British Library show that among the works he translated or edited individually were:

- 1865 The Grammatical Forms of Southern English, ab. A.D. 1220-30, occurring in the Ancren Riwle
- 1871 Morte Arthure, or, The Death of Arthur (1871) a new edition

He also worked with together with other scholars on the Canterbury Tales and other medieval texts. He moved to Cambridge to become a reader in medieval and oriental languages for the Cambridge University Press.

== Education ==
The Brock children attended St Barnabas Church of England infant and junior school. The boys then went on to the Boys Higher Grade School at Paradise Street in Cambridge. (Note: The name Higher Grade referred to the fact that these schools aimed for a higher standard than the existing elementary schools.) The school charged 6d. a week for boys under ten and 9d. a week if they were older. The Cambridge school had a good reputation and qualified for grants from the Science and Art Department (Note: The Science and Art Department was a British Government body, initially a subdivision of the Board of Trade, that was tasked with promoting education in art, science, technology, and design in the UK.) at South Kensington. One feature of the school was the Science Classes, which were held in conjunction with the Science and Art Department in South Kensington with examinations held in May of each year with the papers set by its examiners for the Science classes all over the country. The Brocks seemed to feature every prize day, they were certainly some of the most famous pupils. At the first Old Boy's meeting in April 1907, the third Headmaster, the Ref C. J. Smith said that the Brocks had made the school famous.

While the boys attended the Boys' Higher Grade School on Paradise Street, the girls attended the Girl's Higher Grade school. (Note: Kelly gives the address of the Girls' Higher Grade School as being in Park Street, but A History of the County of Cambridge . . . states that the Girls' Higher Grade School in Eden Street opened in 1875 or 1876 and that the school in Park Street only opened as a Higher Grade School in 1896, when the youngest Brock girl, Bertha, was 17.) The Brocks also studied art at the Cambridge School of Art, and all had some musical training as they all played instruments or sang. They had regular musical evenings, either at friend's houses, or at Henry's house Cranford.

The family members were regular contributors to amateur concerts for good causes, and especially for the social events for the St. Andrew's Street Chapel. Here Charles, Richard, and Thomas played a Haydn Trio while Katharine sang, or Thomas and Katharine singing duets, or other concert contributions.

== The Cambridge School of Art ==
The Brocks' art training was mainly at the Cambridge School of Art. The school is often said to have been founded by William John Beamont in 1858. However, the school already existed as part of the Working Men's College. Beamont, on becoming secretary of the school, fundraised aggressively, gave the school new life and expanded it into a flourishing school of art. (Note: John Ruskin to give the inaugural address for the expanded school, which sometimes leads to Ruskin being credited as the founder of the school.) The school survives today as one of the institutions that evolved over time to become Anglia Ruskin University.

At least five of the Brocks attended the school and won prizes there. Charles was a teacher at the school, and Richard was a pupil-teacher until 1895. The school was affiliated with the Government's Science and Art Department based at South Kensington. While the High School promoted Science, the Cambridge School of Art promoted education in arts and crafts. (Note: There was also a Cambridge and County School of Arts and Crafts, run jointly by the Country Council and Cambridge Borough Council. This too appears to have become part of Anglia Ruskin University via the Cambridgeshire College of Art and Technology.) As part of the effort to promote education in art, the Science and Arts Department awarded three levels of prizes nationally up to 1891: Bronze Medals, The National Book Prize, and Grade 3 Grade. From then on, these prizes were replaced by scholarships, and by local prizes at the schools, usually adjudicated by someone from the department.

To put the value of the prizes into context, in 1893 the school had 196 pupils and a fee income of £201 17s; meaning that the average fee per student was just over £1. The school also depended on a grant from the Science and Art Department and a grant from the Cambridge Borough Council.

Prizes and awards gained by five of the Brocks at the Cambridge School of Art
Year	Charles	Richard	Thomas	Henry	Katharine	Notes
1889		Hon. Men. Best landscape from nature in oil or water colour				
1890	Bronze Medal: Painting of a head from life. 3rd grade: Chalk drawing of a head from life. 3rd grade: Chalk drawing of a figure from the antique. Local prizes: 1st. Best painting or drawing from life, 1st best chalk drawing from the cast.	3rd grade: Chalk drawing of group of models. 3rd grade: Chalk drawing of ornament from the cast. Excellent and prize: Shaded drawing of Models. Excellent and prize: Shaded drawing from the cast. Local prize: 2nd best chalk drawing from the cast.		Excellent and prize: Perspective		(Note: Charles' Bronze Medal was the first national medal that the school had won since 1871.)
1891	Two Bronze Medals: Paintings of heads from life. 3rd grade: Painting from the antique and anatomical studies. Excellent and prize: Painting from still life	3rd grade: Studies of architectural order and construction of ornament. Excellent and prize: Perspective (theory and practice)		Excellent and prize: Free hand drawing,. Excellent and prize: Model drawing.		(Note: Charles won bronze medals for each of two portraits that were displayed at South Kensington.)
1892	Local prize: Hon. Award. Painting from life.	Local prize: Design (£1)		Local prize: (joint first) Outline from cast (10s.). Success in examinations in advanced subjects (12s.)		(Note: There were no more national prizes, apart from scholarships and specific competitions, and local prizes became more important.)
1893				Local prize: Chalk drawing from the cast (£1)	Local prize: Work in Evening Classes (7s. 6d.)	
1894				Free Studentship awarded by South Kensington. Local Prizes: 1st Drawing or painting from life (£1). Landscape painting from nature (£1). Design (£1). 2nd Drawing of a figure from the antique (10s.). 1st Drawing of a head from the antique (£1).	Local Prize: For sets of Meritorious Work (5s). For success in Examinations (8s.)	
1895		Local Prize: (equal place with Henry) Drawing and painting from life (£1 1s. each)		Second free studentship awarded by South Kensington. A Queen's Book Prize in the national competition for four panels representing the elements. Local Prize: (equal place with Richard) Drawing and painting from life (£1 1s. each)	Local prizes: Set of studies of flowers from nature. Success in examinations.	
1896				No data available, but it would appear from comments in 1897 that Henry got another free studentship.		
1897			Local prize: Drawing or painting from life (£1 1s.) Drawing from the antique (£1 1s.) Hon. Men. Monochrome painting from the cast in water colour. Success in examinations (7s. 6d.)	Free studentship again awarded by South Kensington. Local prize: Design (£1 1s.) Local prize: Hon. Men. Design		(Note: Thomas had been studying for his degree until 1895, and there is no data on prizes and awards in 1896.)
1898			Local prizes: 1st Drawing or painting from life. 1st Drawing from the antique.			
1899			Local prize: Hon. Men. Drawing from the antique			

== Religion and politics ==
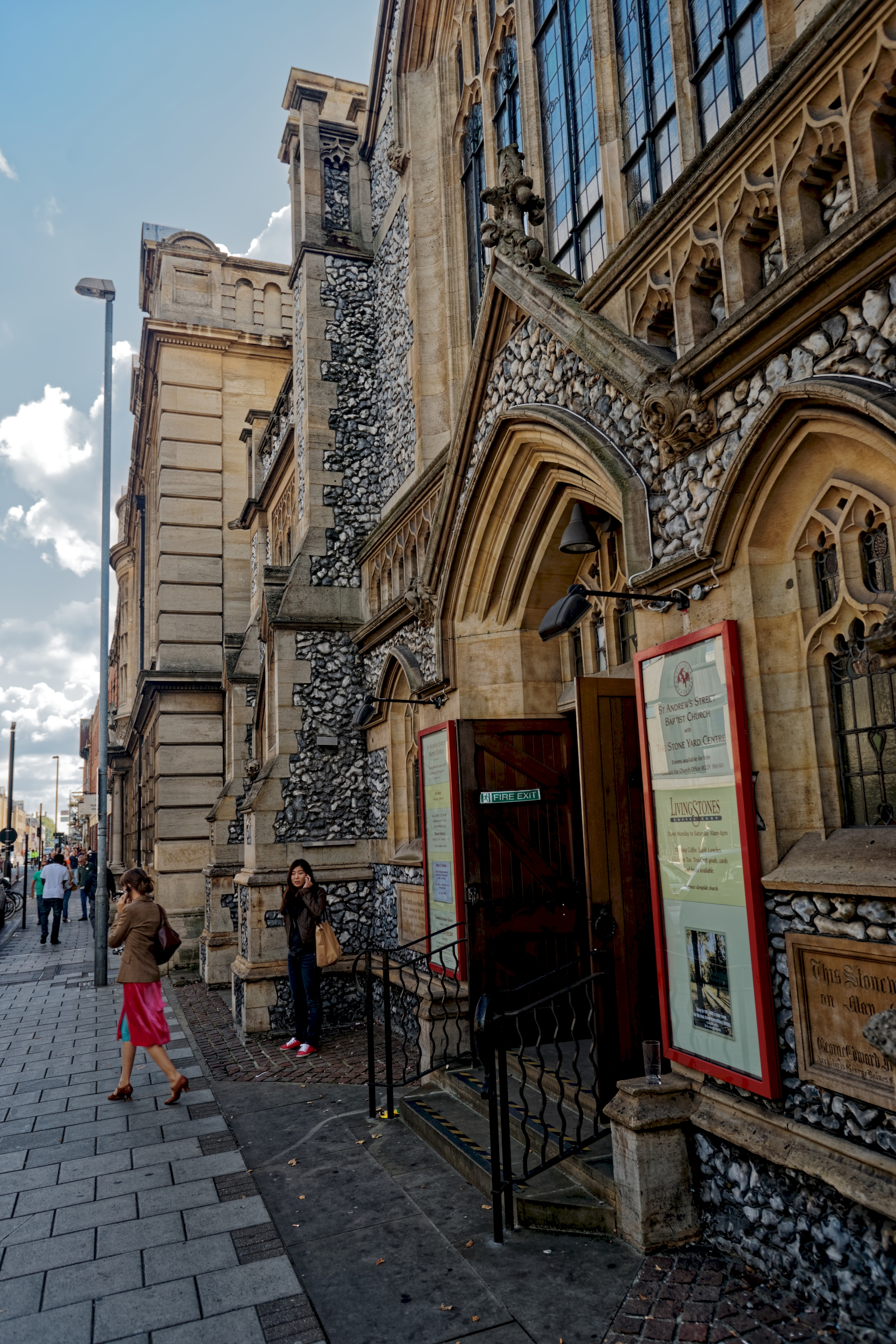
The Baptist Church in St. Andrew's Street that the Brocks attended

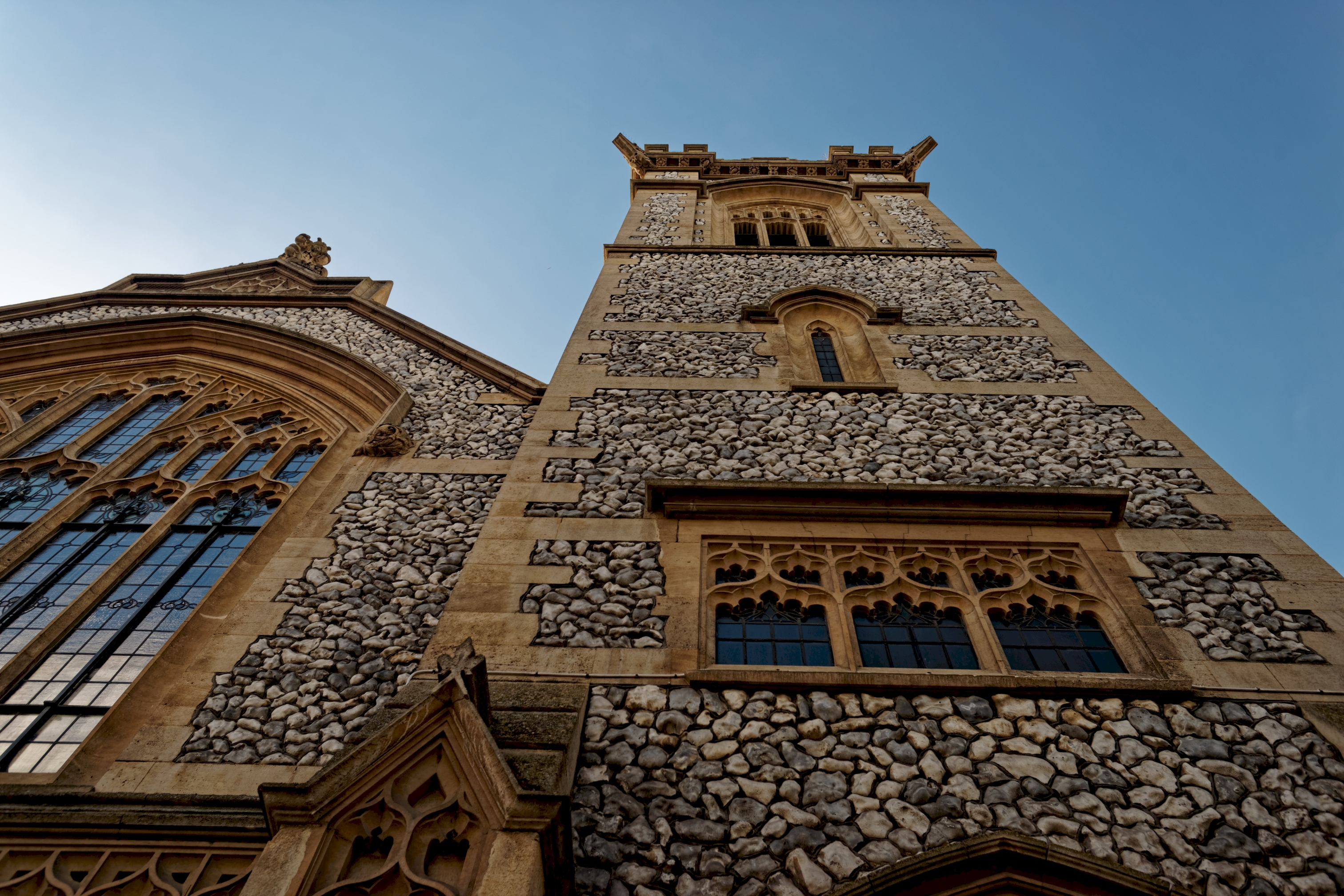
Front elevation of the church, above the ground floor level

All of the Brocks were involved with the St. Andrew's Street Baptist Chapel. Worship had begun in a former stable and granary on the site in 1721. This was replaced by a larger chapel in 1764, and gain in 1836. The present building was designed by the architects George and Reginald Palmer Baines in 1903. The Brocks had helped with fund raising for the building of the new Chapel in 1903. Bertha and Katharine manned stalls at the Puritan Bazaar in the Guildhall to raise money for the new chapel, while the brothers performed in the concert. All four brothers, and Charles' wife were at the church to receive the Free Church Summer School in August 1907. Katharine was the president of the Girls Guild at St. Andrews. As noted above, the Brocks were frequent contributors to social functions and concerts at St. Andrew's. Thomas was a member of the Robert Hall Baptist student society, which met at St. Andrews.

In politics the family were Liberal. Charles was an Assenter for the nomination of the Liberal candidate in the 1906. General Election of 1906 Edmund and three of his sons were recorded as attending the Guildhall meeting for the Liberal Party candidate in 1909. The brothers were members of the Liberal Club, with an address in Downing Street in Cambridge. Thomas played for the club in the Cambridge Billiard League. and was one of the chief subscribers for a cash presentation for club's caretaker when he retired in 1920.

== The family home ==
After their marriage, the Edmund and Mary Ann Brock moved first to Leighton Road, Kentish Town, North London where Alice was born in (1868). This was only the first home for the family. They lived at:

- Hampden Road, Holloway, London, where Charles was born in 1870
- 7 Cornwall Terrace, Friern Barnet, North London, where Richard was born in 1871
- Coronation Street, Cambridge, where Thomas was born in 1872
- 4 Perowne Street, Cambridge, where the remaining three children were born in 1875, 1876, 1879
- 10 Tenison Street, which was their address in September 1888, when Henry was awarded the junior Science and Art Scholarship.
- 4 North Terrace, Cambridge
- 3 Barrie Villas, Abbey Road, 1889
- 14 Brunswick Walk in 1894
- Arundine House, 35, Madingley Road, sometime around 1898. This was an address that would house family member for the next seventy years. (Note: The electoral register shows Henry's daughters at this address in 1966, and it was the address given for Margaret when she died in 1967.)

Arundine House was a large three story detached house. The front of the house is not symmetrical, with the leftmost third of the house looking as if it were attached to the initial symmetrical design for the right-most two thirds. There is a three-storey annex at the rear of the house, which may have been built as an extension. It is not clear when Arundine House was built, but a building was already on the site when the Ordnance Survey surveyed the area in 1886.

The adjoining property at 33 Madingley Road, on the corner with Wilberforce Road, was known as Field Cottage, and was taken by the Richard and his wife in 1925. They were still living there in 1935, but had left by 1938. Field Cottage was still in use in 1960, but the address does not appear on the 1966 electoral register. The site is now occupied by a terrace of houses facing onto Wilberforce Road. While Arundine house was still a single unit in 1939, the electoral registers show that it was divided into three flats by 1950, with flat one being rented out and flats two and three being taken by members of the family.

== The studio ==
The huge (Note: The Studio seems to be about 7 m by 13 m in area and is nearly as tall as the house.) studio in the back garden was built by the Brocks. There was a building, smaller than the studio, on the site of the studio in 1901 when the Ordnance Survey revised the map, but by the 1925 survey the Studio was in its current format. This is separate from the house, but has a roofed-in connection to it. The most startling aspect of the studio is the large lantern north-light, which is itself nearly two floors high.

The Brocks built the studio. All four brothers worked together in this studio, (Note: Percy Bradshaw described the four brothers as working in a large old world studio . . . in a Jane Austen atmosphere) with Charles and Henry returning to it by day even after they had married and moved out of the main house. The studio was heated by a big 'jumbo' stove which impressed Katharine's daughter Barbara.

One feature of the studio, was the collection of period costumes and furniture that Charles and Henry maintained there, these, together with the costume prints and fashion plates of the Regency period helped to ensure the accuracy of their illustrations of authors such as Jane Austen. They sometimes had clothes especially made to match those of a particular period for their models. Their knowledge of antiques led in part to their being asked by Walter Mallett to help illustrate the 6th edition of the Illustrated history of furniture, from the earliest to the present time. (1906) by Frederick Litchfield (1850–1930). This edition had 86 more pages and 100 more illustrations than the 5th edition of 1903.

== The Cranford School ==
The 'Cranford School' of illustration was not so much a 'school' with a common training, but more of a style. It was named for the 1891 Macmillian reissue of Elizabeth Cleghorn Gaskell's Cranford by Hugh Thomson. The style was a nostalgic, affectionate and slightly whimsical approach to historical themes. Thomson's illustration in the book inaugurated a Cranford School distinguished by graphic nostalgia for a philistinism that was no more. The members of the school had all been fired by the literature, art, costume or atmosphere of England in the eighteenth century and became dealers in nostalgia on a very large scale. It was a style of illustration harking back to pre-industrial rural England, which specialized in the nostalgic recreation of a by-gone golden era before the ravages of industrialization. In reality, it was only the introduction of photo-mechanical reproduction of drawings instead of wood engravings that enabled the fine pen lines distinctive of the school.

Charles and Henry were both members of the 'Cranford School'. It is probably no accident that the house Charles' moved to after his marriage in 1902, at Grange Road, Cambridge, was named 'Cranford'. Although Richard drew in the same style, he can hardly be called a member of the school as when he turned to illustration in 1920, he concentrated on contemporary topics rather than harking back to The Regency and Georgian eras. The Brock children's maternal cousin Fred Pegram RI, was also a member of the school.

== The Brock children ==
=== Alice Emma (1868–1896) ===
Alice Emma Brock was born at 139 Leighton Road, Kentish Town, North London, on 1 January 1886. She was both the eldest of the Brock children and the shortest lived of them, dying at twenty-eight. She has left very few traces. She died in Great Yarmouth, (Note: Great Yarmouth is probably the nearest sea-side town to Cambridge by the then main-line rail network.) Norfolk on 24 July 1896. She died from peritonitis exhaustion at East View, (Note: Presumably a guest house, as the name suggests a house looking out over the sea, as Cliff Hill offers some good seaward views. Gorleston is on the south bank of the mouth of the River Yare.) Cliff Hill, Gorleston, Great Yarmouth. Her brother Thomas was with her when she died.

=== Charles Edmund (1870–1938) ===
Charles Edmund Brock RI was the eldest, and the most successful, of the Brock brothers. He was born at the family home at Hampden Road, Holloway, London, England on Saturday 5 February 1870. Like his brothers, Charles was educated first at St Barnabas junior and infant school, before moving to the Boys' Higher Grade School which all of this brothers attended in their turn. C. J. Smith, the third headmaster of the Higher Grade School noted that the Brocks were the most famous of its pupils, and that early drawings and paintings by Charles were among his most prized possessions. Charles did not feature in prize days at the school as much as his younger brothers did, but where he did shine was at the Cambridge School of Art. Here he won prizes for painting, chalk drawing, painting and drawing from life etc.

Charles had at least some art training from the talented Cambridge sculptor Henry Wiles (1838 – 11 August 1930) who was a near neighbour of the Brocks when they lived in North Terrace. There is no evidence of Charles doing any sculpture, and he did do portraits of Henry Wiles and his father, the stone-mason John Wiles (1812–1908).

Charles also attended the Cambridge School of Art, as did his three brothers, and at least one sister (Katharine). On 25 September 1902, Charles married Annie Dudley Smith (13 September 1879 – 15 December 1959) at the St. Andrew's Street Baptist Chapel. On returning from their honeymoon, the couple lived at Cranford at 38 Grange Road, Cambridge, where he was to remain until his death. The couple had no children.

Kirkpatrick lists nearly 270 books or sets of books (such as the 30 volume Thackeray) that were illustrated by Brock. This was only part of his output. He also illustrated magazines, and painted portraits, mostly of leading Cambridge academics.

Charles served as the executor for his father's small estate of £142, after the latter's death on 3 April 1921. Charles, who had been in poor health for some time, died on 38 February 1938, in Cranford, the house he had lived in since his marriage. His estate was valued at £2,458. His widow moved into 15 Hughes Place, Cambridge with her sister-in-law Bertha and her brother-in-law Thomas. Thomas died at the end of 1939, survived by three of his siblings, Richard, Henry, and Katharine. Charles's widow, Annie Dudley, survived him by twenty-one years, dying on 15 December 1959.

==== Punch illustrations by Charles ====
The following medical-themed Punch illustrations are by courtesy of the Wellcome Collection. Charles had 109 illustrations published in Punch between 6 February 1901 and 30 March 1910.

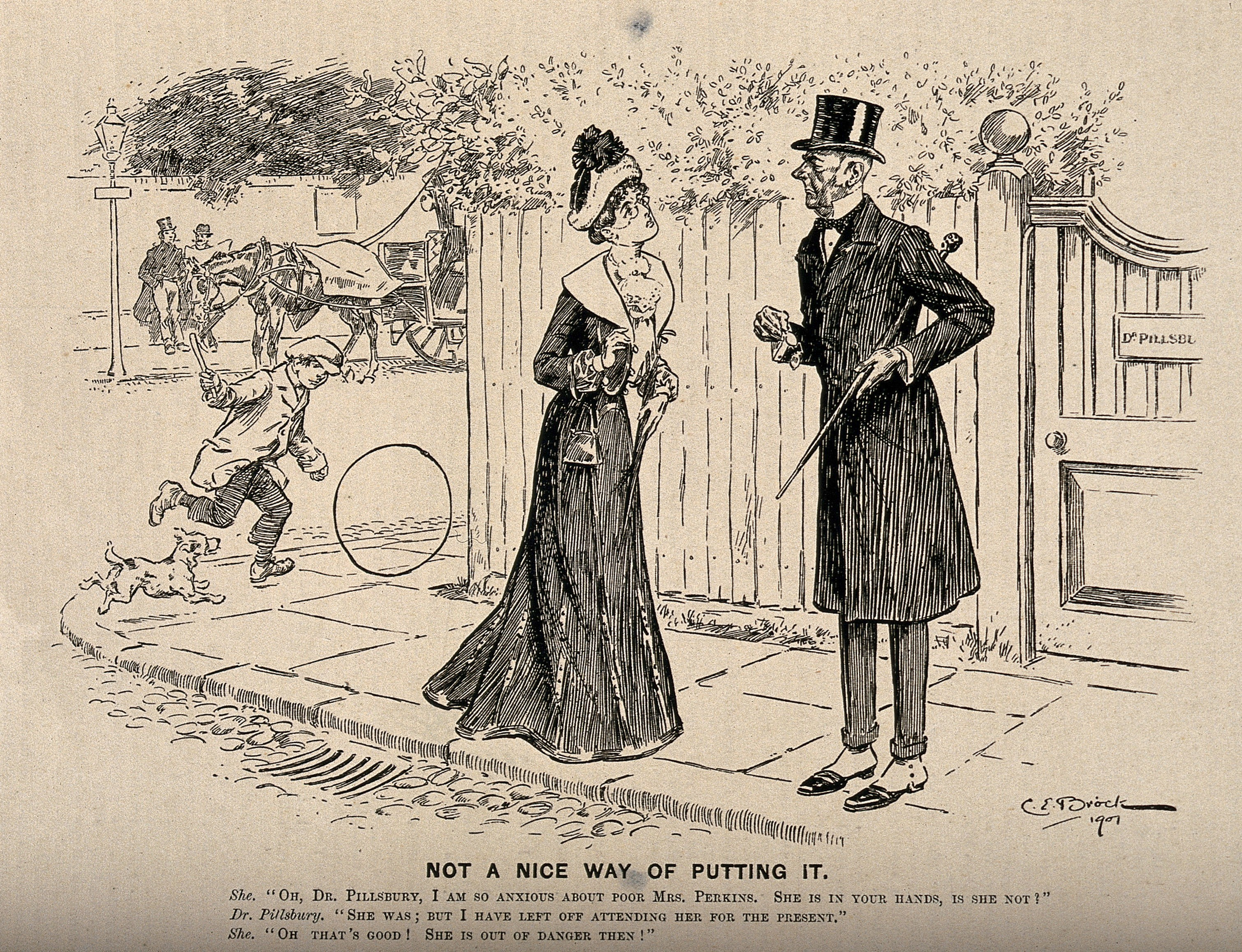

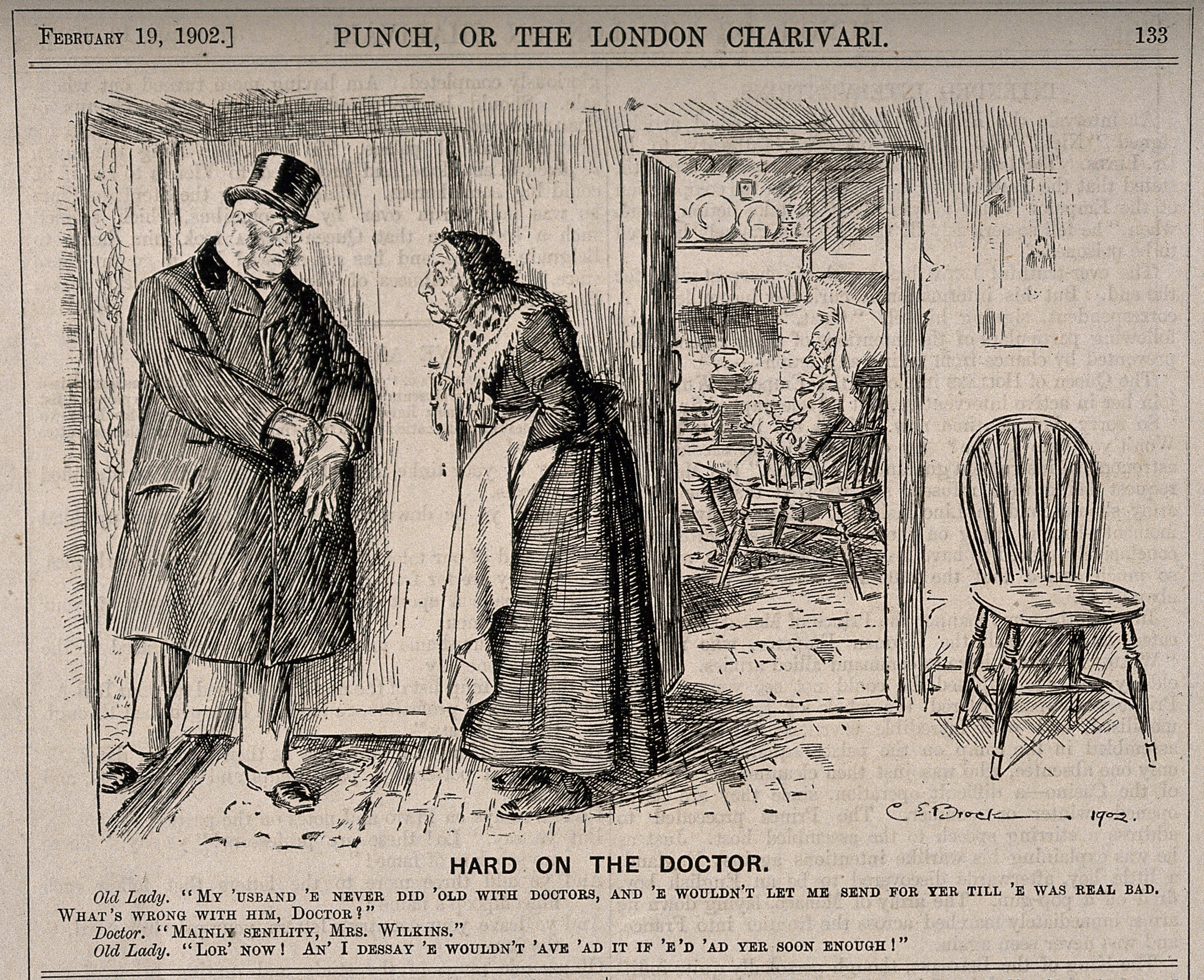

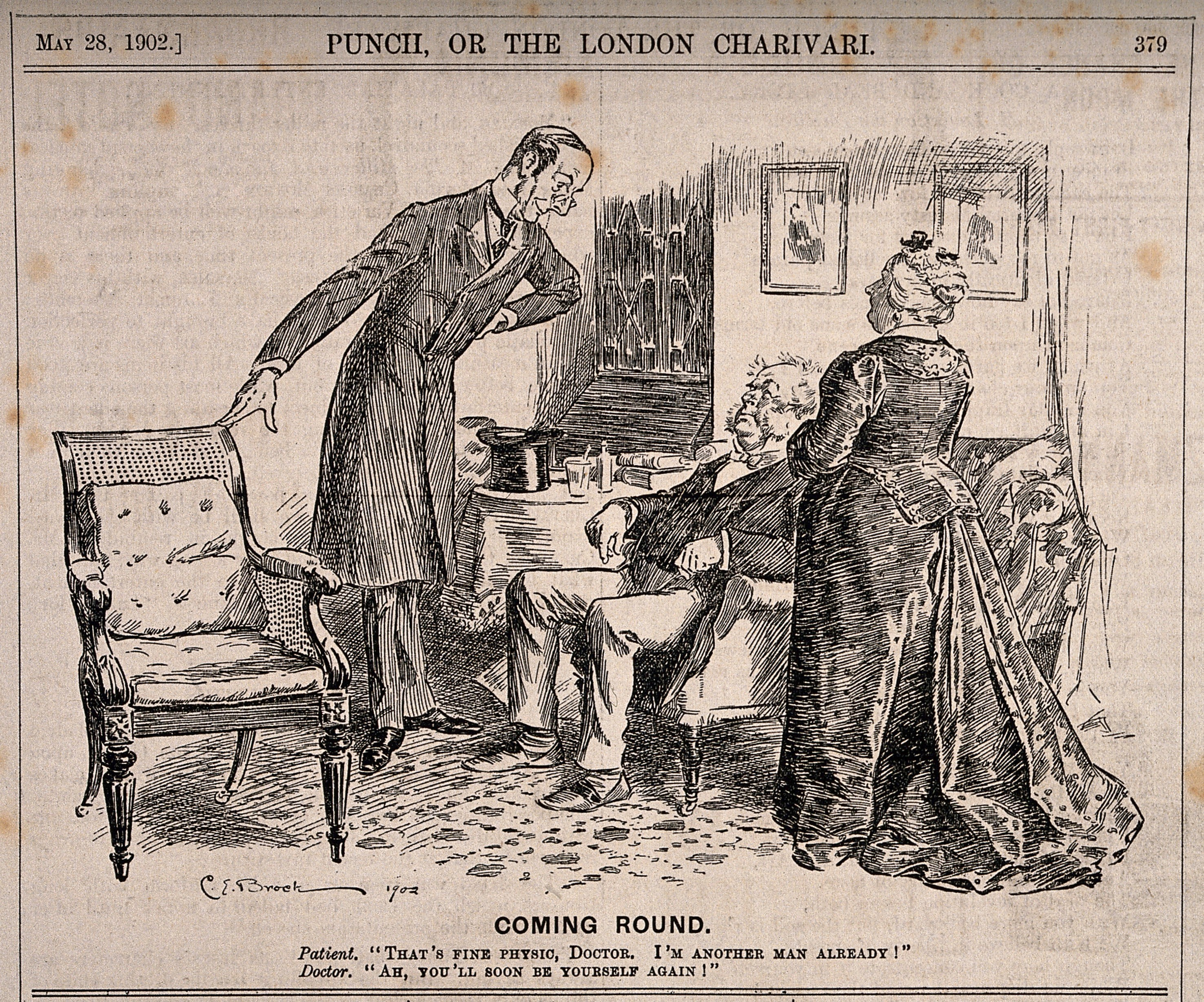

=== Richard Henry (1871–1943) ===
Richard Henry "Dick" Brock was born on Friday, 21 July 1871, at Colney Hatch, in London. His family moved to Cambridge shortly after his birth. Like his brothers he attended St Barnabas, and then the Higher Grade Boys' School. At the Higher Grade Boys' School, he was a science scholar for 1889–1890. (Note: This was presumably a scholarship awarded by the Department of Science and Art.) He also attended the Cambridge School of Art where he won a whole range of national prizes. By 1891, the census shows that Richard was not only a student but also a teacher (a pupil-teacher) at the Cambridge Art School. He continued in this role until 1895, when the Committee of the School of Art noted that they had lost his services.

Richard did some illustration for The Infant's Magazine and The Family Friend in 1897, but Kirkpatrick states that he then concentrated on painting for the next 20 years. Holland states that Richard concentrated on painting, earning a modest income from local landscapes, mostly in oils. He only exhibited Kelly says that Richard undoubtedly preferred to paint cows and horses in meadows by the Cam to any other subject. However, Kelly states the from 1908 onwards, the Wells Gardner, Darton & Co.'s Prize Annual always carried his drawings in black and white, often up to the 30 drawings, and that he also contributed illustrations to same company's Chatterbox Annual.

Richard was an accomplished musician, playing not only the violin and cello, but also the double base. Richard was not just a casual player, but played with the Cambridge Orchestral Society, and was elected a member of the Society's committee in 1903.

Richard was a relatively frequent exhibitor. (Note: Brock exhibited as follows: 18 works at the Royal Birmingham Society of Artists, 19 works at the Walker Art Gallery, Liverpool, one work at the Manchester City Art Gallery, eight works at the Royal Academy, three works at the Royal Society of British Artists, eight works at the Royal Institute of Painters in Water Colours, and one work at the Royal Institute of Oil Painters.) In 1916 Richard began contribution to Tatler and Punch, and he had four illustrations published in Punch from 22 March 1916 – 11 April 1917. About this time also he began to contribute sporadically to various periodicals including:

- Chums
- Printer's Pie
- Outward Bound
- The Boy's Own Paper
- The Boys' Magazine
- Chatterbox
- The Wide World Magazine
- The Happy Mag.
- The Detective Magazine
- The Red Magazine
- The Scout
- The Golden Mag.

Richard married Mary Cooke (27 November 1882 – ), a schoolmistress, at the Independent Chapel, Hanworth Road, Hounslow, London on 25 August 1917. The couple appear never to have had any children. In 1918, Richard appears to have applied for an exemption from National Service, as he later withdrew this on the grounds that he was engaged in War Work as a volunteer. While Richard at 45 was too old for conscription when it was first introduced in 1916, (Note: The Military Service Act 1916 introduced conscription in Great Britain for all healthy males from 19 to 40 years of age.) this changed in 1918. The Military Service (No. 2) Act 1918 extended the age limits to 18 to 51, bringing Richard, at 47, into the net.

While Kirkpatrick states that Richard and Mary remained in the family home, Arundine House, until 1938, the electoral registers show that they moved into the house next door, Field Cottage in 1925 and was still there in 1935. Richard worked in the studio with his three brothers. Richard began to illustrate children's books in earnest in 1920, starting with Three Girls on a Ranch by Bessie Marchant, and went on to illustrate at least 80 books in total. Many of these were girl's stories, but he also illustrated many annuals.

Kirkpatrick states that Richard seems to have stopped illustrating periodicals in 1932, and books in c. 1940. By 1939 Richard and Mary were running a boarding house in Hastings, and subsequently moved to Hounslow in London in 1940. (Note: Kirkpatrick notes that Richard and Mary stopped advertising the boarding house after June 1940. In fact, they were still advertising it in July, but by then, the emergency regulations concerning coastal areas would have prevented anyone staying at the guest-house who was not already a Hasting's resident, and the beaches were closed-off and mined.) Richard dies at 32 Bulstrode Road of heart disease on 11 June 1943.

Holland states that Richard's illustrations lacked the skill and vigour of his brother Harry's illustrations. Kelly states that his drawings were not up to the standards of those of Charles or Henry.

==== Punch illustrations by Richard ====
Richard only published four sketches (as the illustrations with a punchline were called) in Punch, three in 1916 and one in 1917. All of them refer to the war in one way or other. The 1917 sketch is an example of the way in which Punch illustrators depicted the Land Girls. Kelly says that the drawings show the Richard was clearly happier drawing animals rather than people.

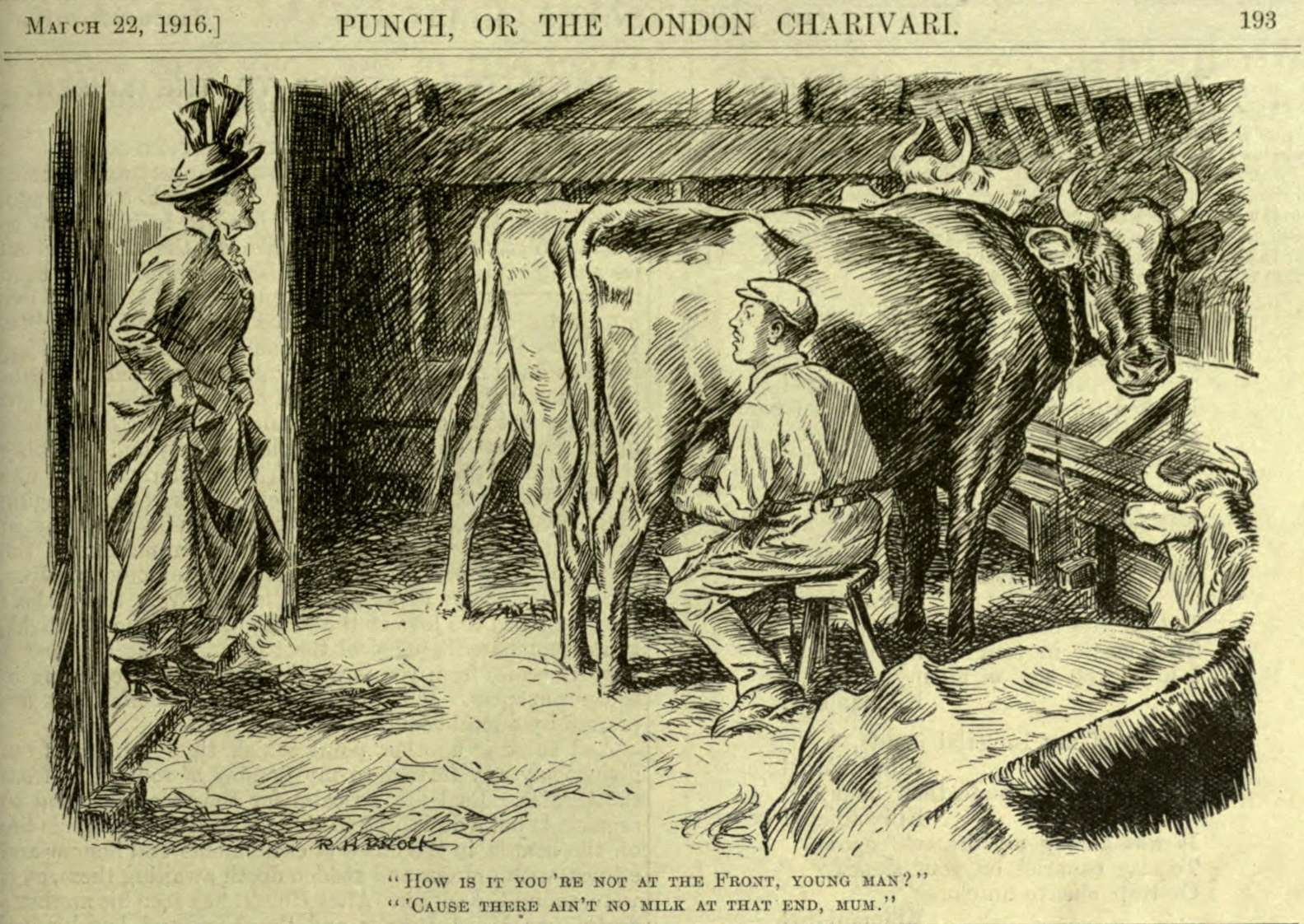

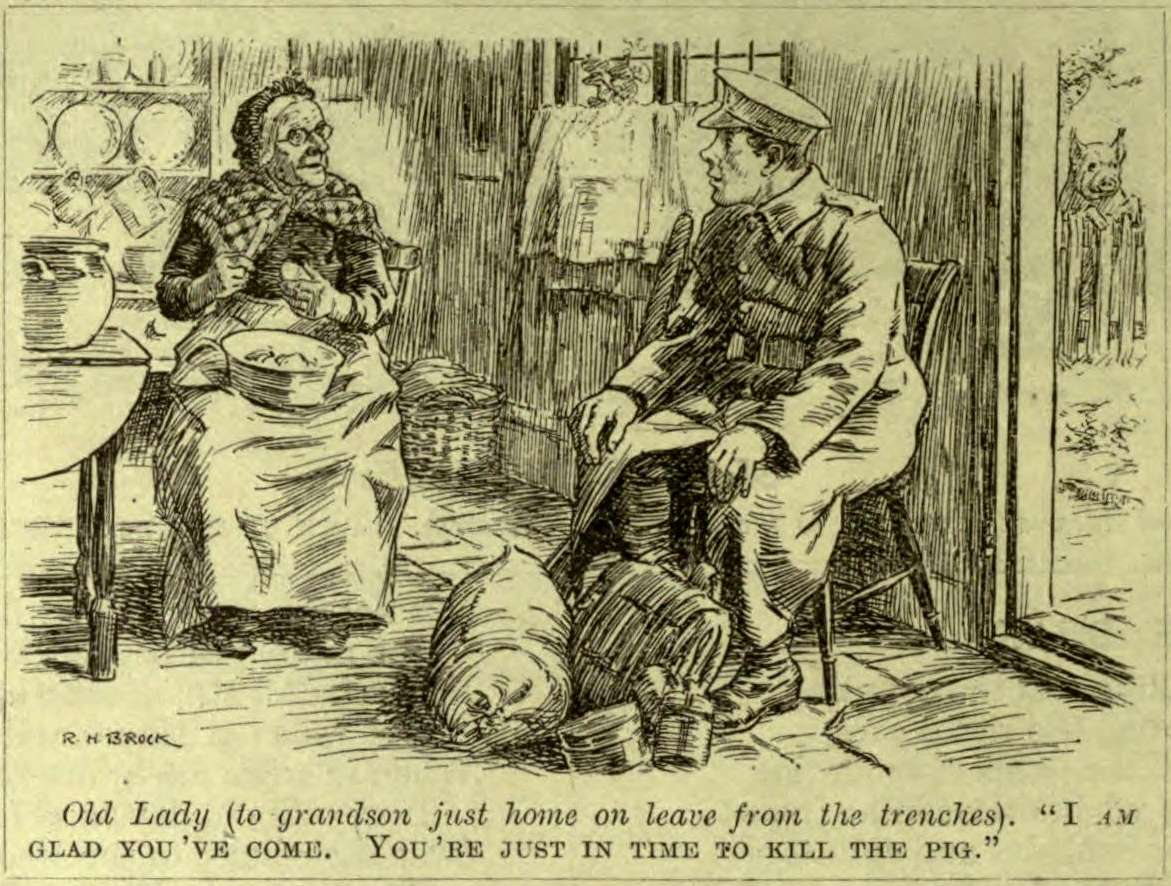

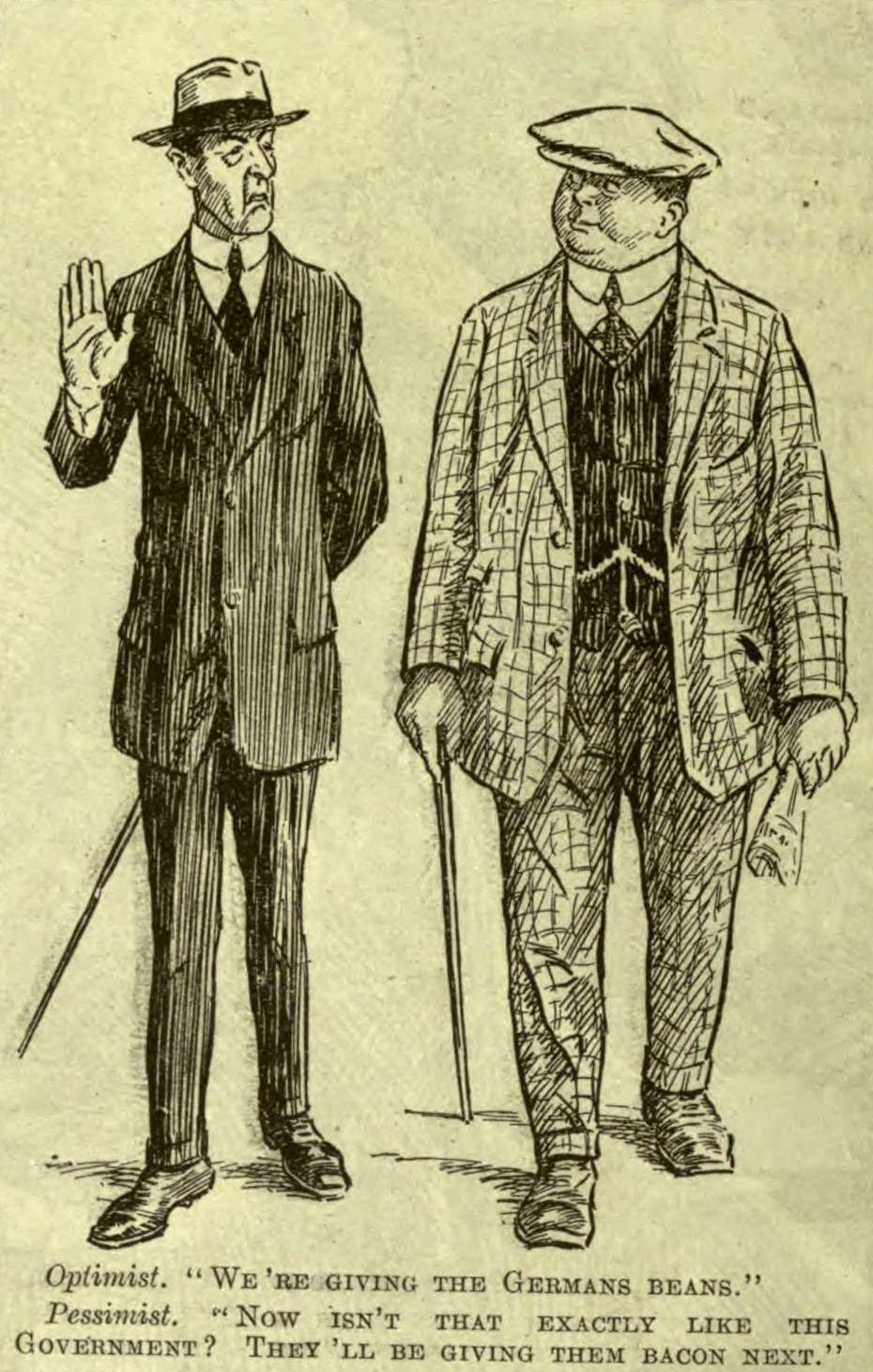

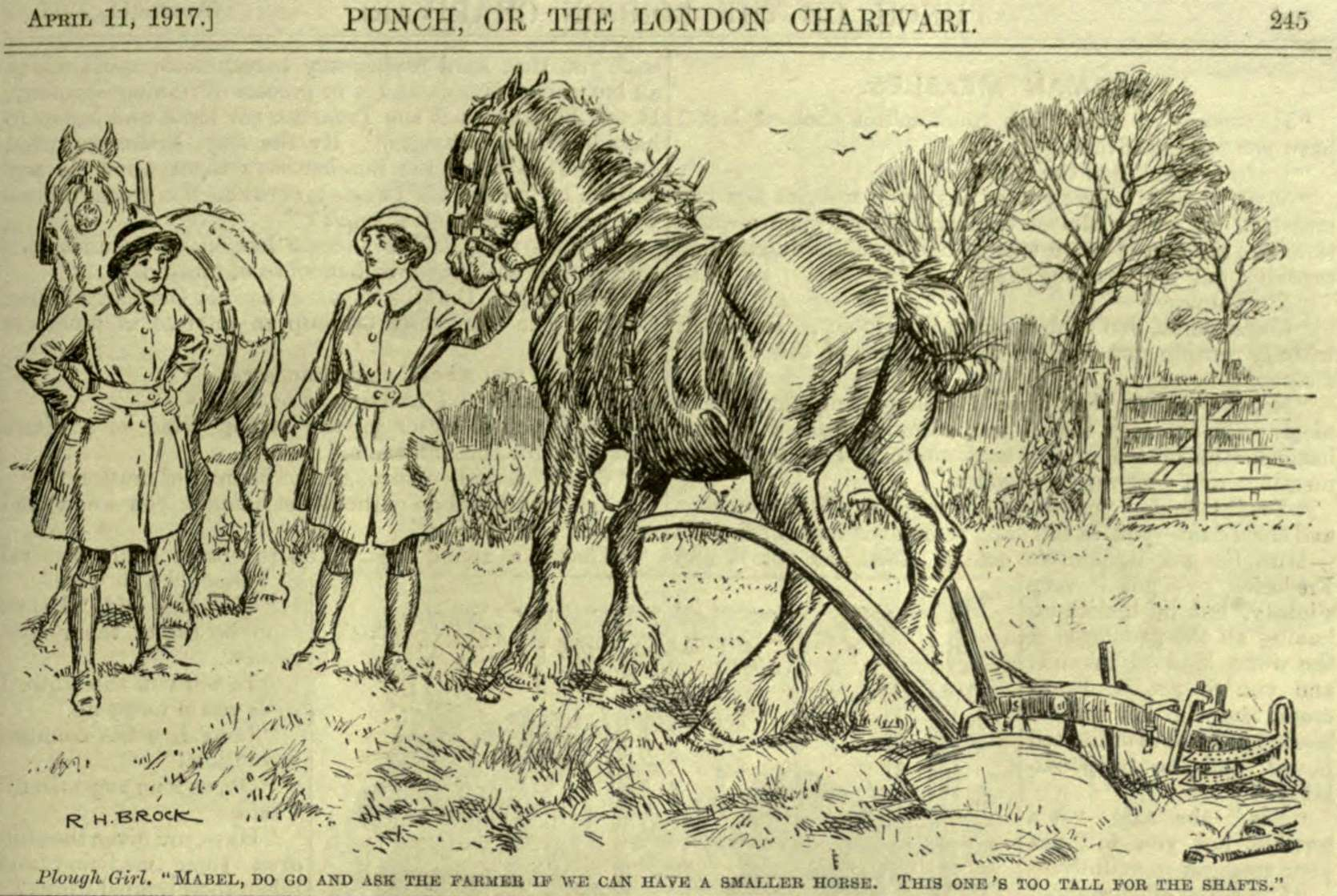

=== Thomas Alfred (1872–1939) ===
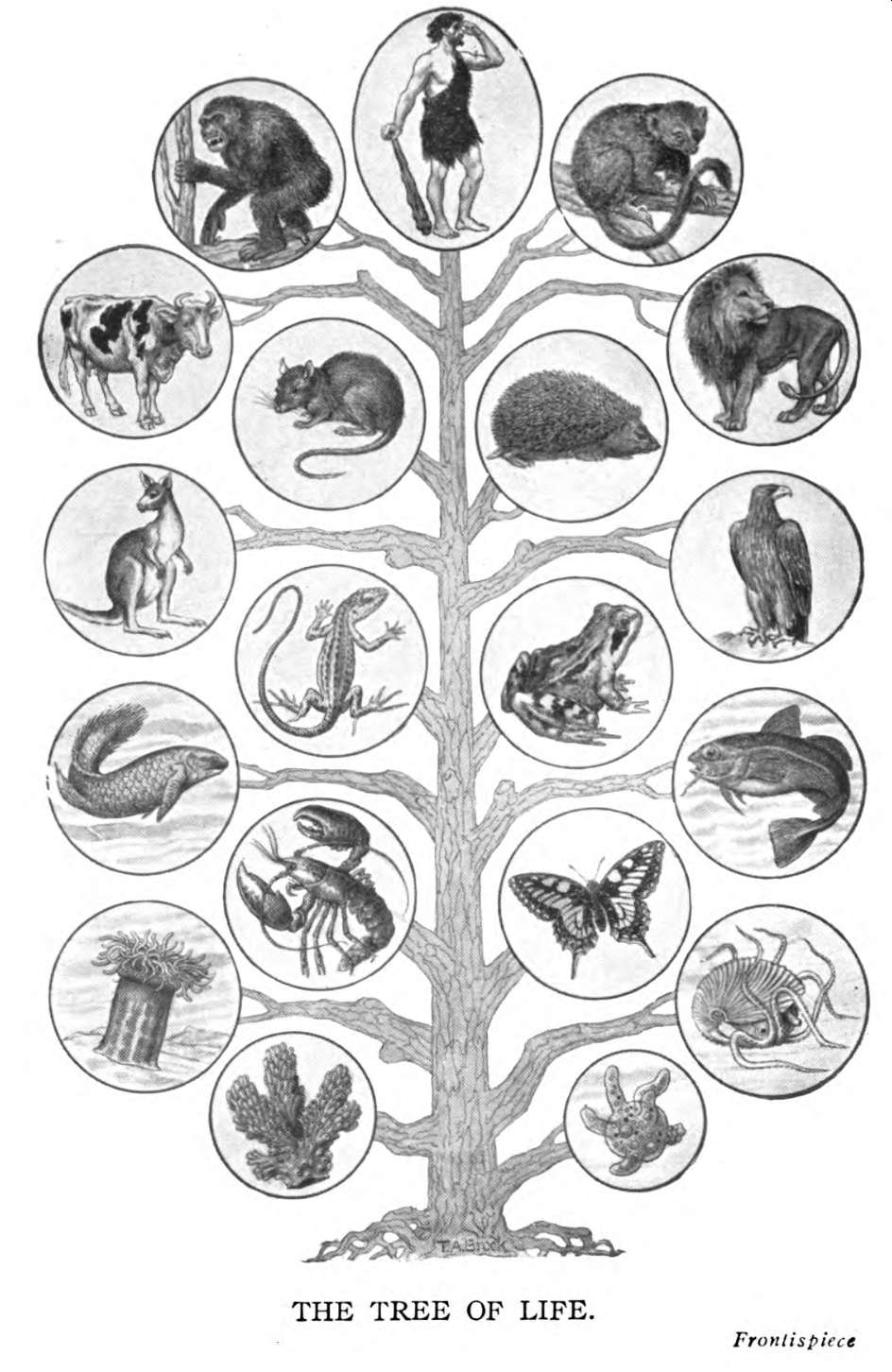
A rare children's book illustration by T. A. Brock

Thomas Alfred was born on Sunday, 15 December 1872, the fourth child of his parents and the first to be born since their move to Cambridge. Like his brothers he was educated at the Higher Grade School in Cambridge, where he was a star pupil. While he was in Form 1b he was top of the prize list for that form. He also took the Mapping Prize and the Leeke Prize for his year. (Note: Presumably the Mapping Prize given by Mr Papworth was for map work. The donor here may have been Wyatt Papworth, an architect and surveyor with an interest in technical education. It is not clear from the context what the Leeke prizes were. Perhaps they were prizes for mathematics instituted by Edward Tucker Leeke who had been Second Wrangler (Second best in Maths in the year) when he graduated from Cambridge.)

Two years later Thomas took the prize for attendance another for exceeding the standard in Class 1a.

The following year his mathematical bent was on show when he achieved a First Class in stage 3 mathematics. Thomas gained the reputation of being the best mathematician that the Higher Grade School ever had.

Thomas won a sizarship, i.e. at least a partial scholarship to study mathematics at St. John's College in Cambridge, being admitted there on 13 October 1892. He graduated with an honours B. A. degree in mathematics in 1895, being 25th Wrangler. He was awarded an M. A. degree in 1899. He was the only one of his siblings to attend university.

Some sources refer to Richard as the forgotten Brock brother of the three Brock brothers, being far less known than Charles or Henry. When Thomas is mentioned at all, it is usually to say that he became a mathematician. However, Newbolt states that there were four Brock brothers working as illustrators of which Charles and Henry were the best known.

Throughout his life Thomas described himself as an artist and draftsman:

- In the 1901 census, he described himself as a Draughtsman of Geological Plates.
- In the 1911 census, he gave his profession as: Artist (Palaeontographical Draughtsman). By now he was living at Arundine House where he shared a studio with his three brothers. His illustrations of fossils were appearing regularly in the Monograph of the Palaeontographical Society.
- in the 1939 Register, he gave his profession as Artist: Illustrator of Scientific Books.

While his brothers worked at easels, Thomas's workstation was at a microscope, as he used to draw illustrations of microscope slides and microscopic creatures and structures for text-books and journals.

In 1904 Thomas won £40 as second prize in the Daily Chronicle cartoon Competition. Despite this win, Thomas did not join Charles, Henry, or Richard in drawing for Punch but he was the principal source of the jokes that his brothers drew for Punch.

Thomas played a full part in social life in Cambridge. He was a key member of the YMCA's Literary and Debating society. He also played Ping Pong, and was an officer for the Chess and Draughts club. He was a member of the local authority sub-committee that managed the School of Arts and Crafts.

While all of the Brocks seem to have been involved in the Baptist Chapel at St Andrew's street, Thomas and Katharine seem to have been the most involved. Thomas was also a member of the Robert Hall Society, a Baptist student society established by the celebrated classical scholar T. R. Glover and named for the Baptist Robert Hall who had ministered in Cambridge. The society met at the St Andrew's Street Chapel, and was doing so even 60 years later. The society was the first of many Baptist student societies that eventually coalesced into the Baptist Students' Federation.

The eldest of the Brock children, Alice Emma, died on 24 July 1896. Thomas was present at her death in Great Yarmouth. Thomas had gained his B. A. the previous year and was presumably working on his M. A. He was living at home at 14 Brunswick Walk. He left home at 3:30 on 21 December for a short walk, but did not return. His family advertised for any information about him four days later. It is not clear what happened and when he returned.

Thomas never married. Sometime in 1938 or 1939, Thomas and Bertha, who were recorded in the 1935 electoral register as living at Arundine House, moved to 15 Howes Place, Cambridge, where they shared a house with Annie, Charles' widow. Bertha died there on 28 February 1939. Thomas served as the executor for her will, which named him as Thomas Alfred Brock, artist. Thomas did not long survive Bertha, dying on 20 October 1939, after a short illness, at the house he was sharing with Annie. He was buried in the same plot as Charles and Bertha at Histon Road Cemetery, Cambridge.

==== Technical illustrations by Thomas ====
The following illustration by Thomas were from the Monograph of the Palaeontographical Society Volume 63 in 1909. Thomas contributed many illustrations to the monograph from 1900 on. Cambridge University Press recently reissued a classic text on Fossil Plants which features at least one illustration by Thomas.

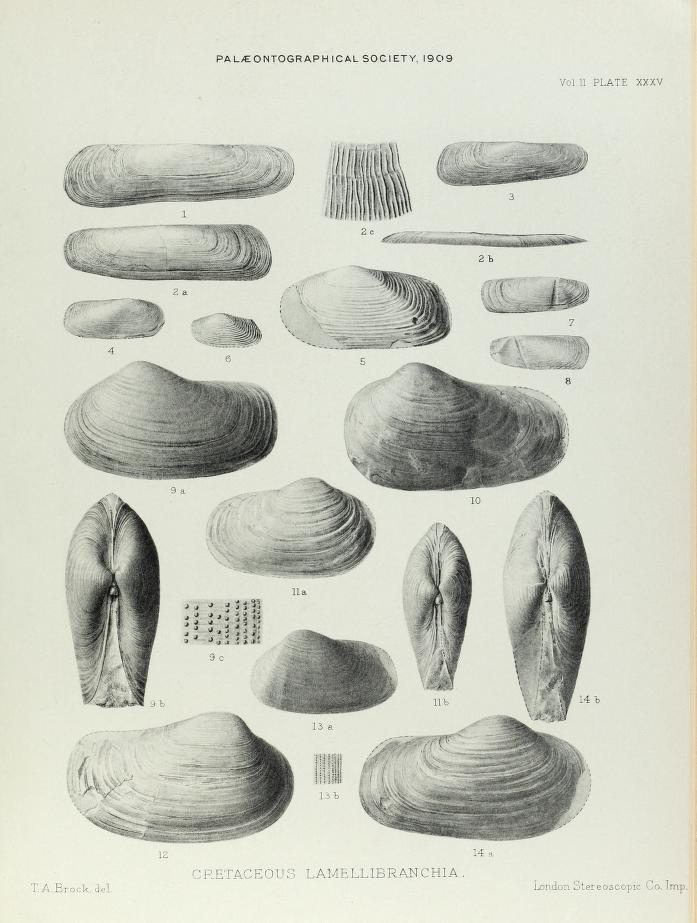

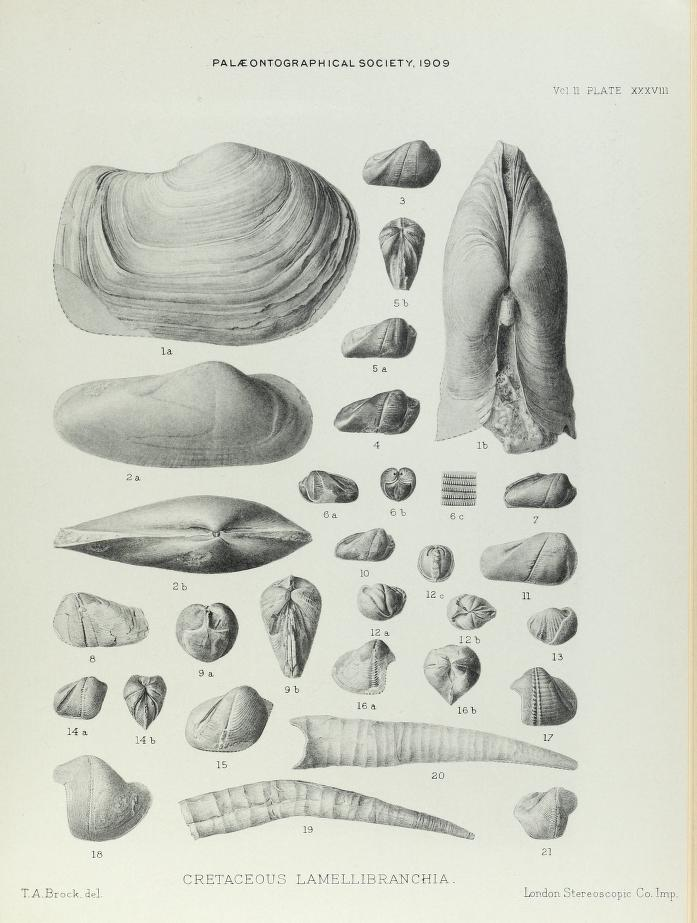

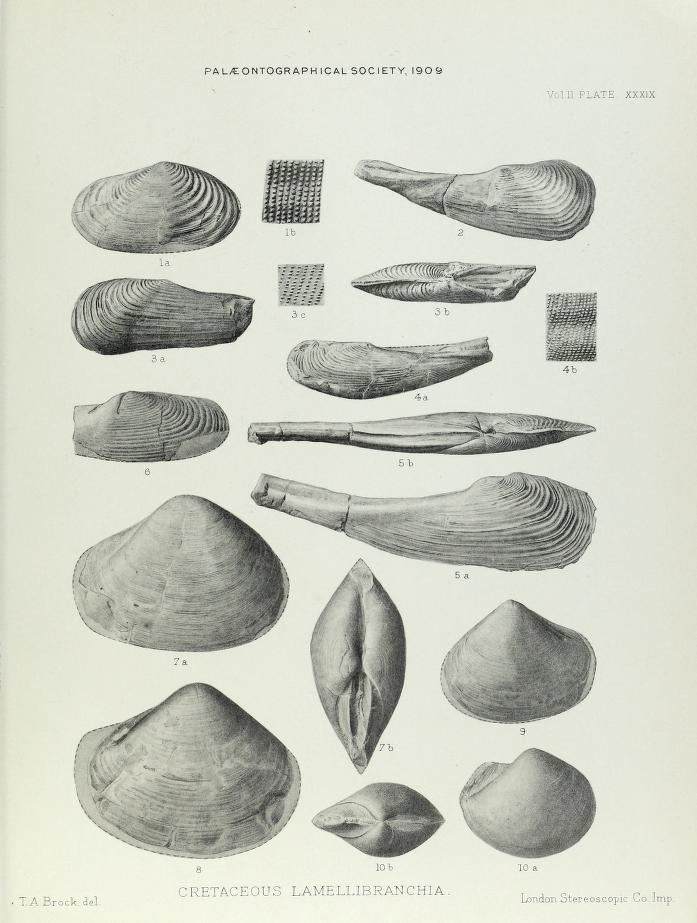

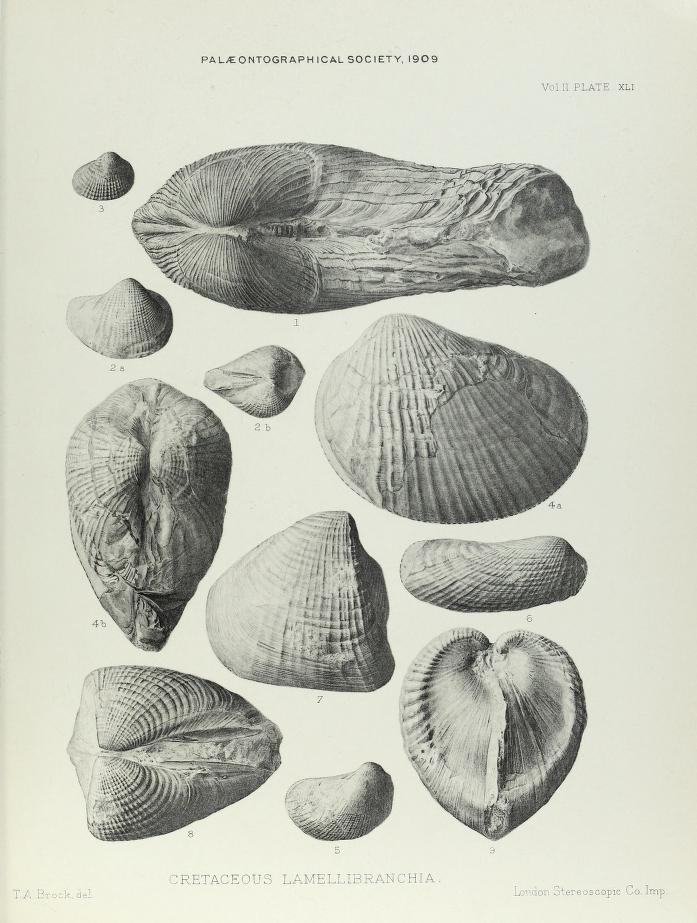

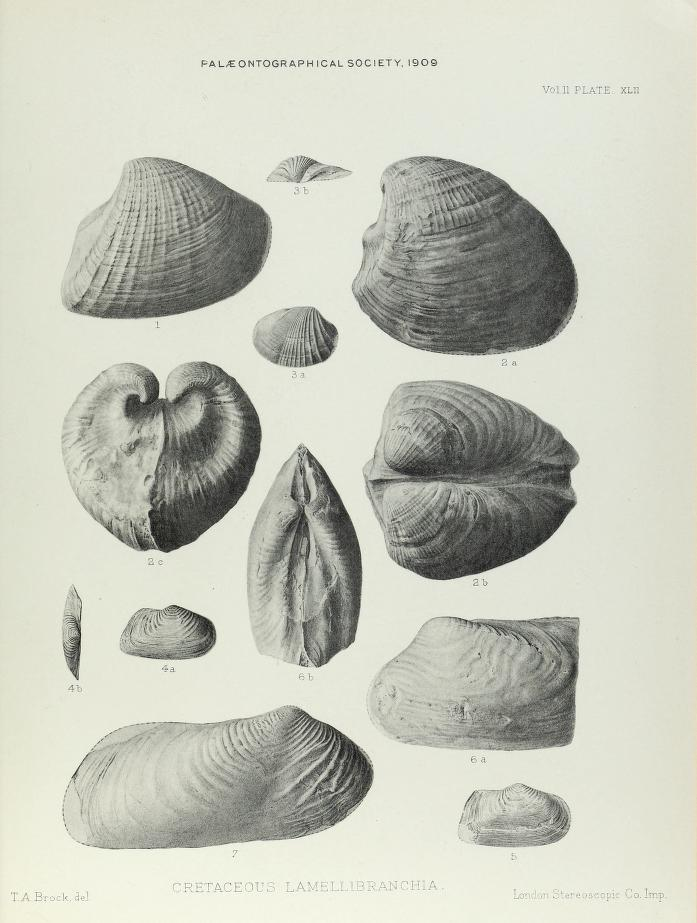

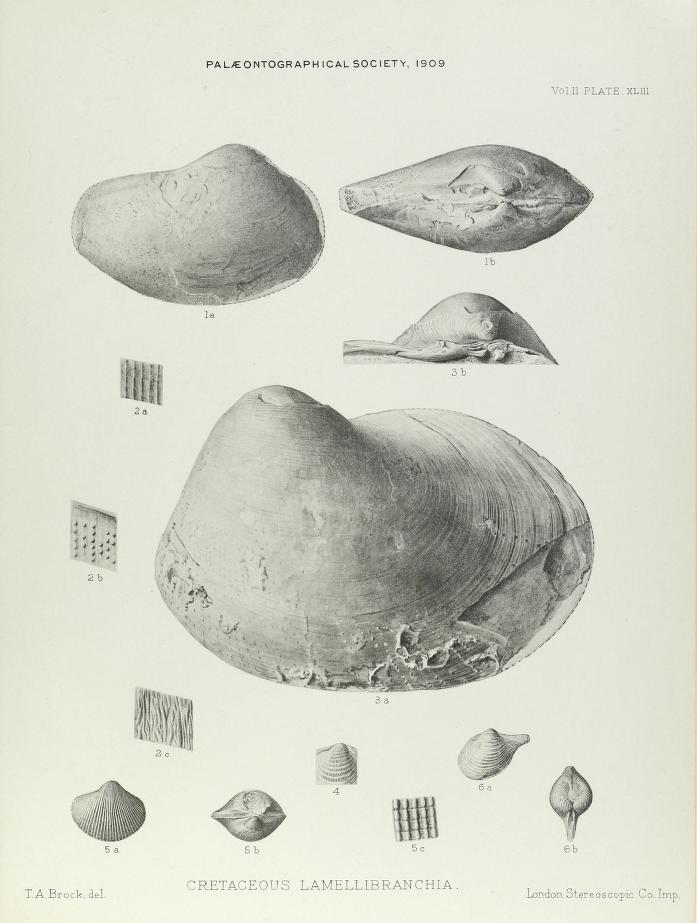

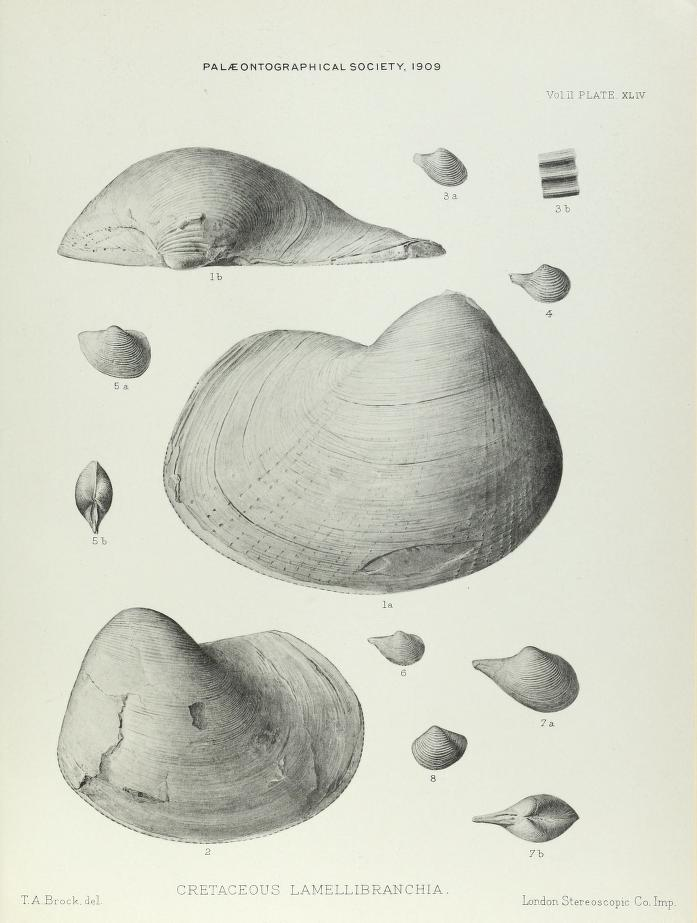

=== Henry Matthew (1875–1960) ===
Henry Matthew "Harry" Brock RI was born on Sunday, 11 July 1875. He was the most prolific illustrator of the Brocks, and one of the most prolific illustrators of his generation. He was the longest living of the Brock brothers, dying at the age of 85. Of his siblings, only Katharine, who lived to 91, was longer living. Kelly includes in the plates in his book a photograph of Henry working away at his easel at 78 years of age.

Like his siblings he was educated first at St. Barnabas, and like his brothers he also attended the Higher Grade Boys' School. Here he was a regular prize winner. When he attended the Cambridge School of Art, he was repeatedly awarded a free studentship by the Science and Art Department at South Kensington.

His first book illustration appears to have been a collaborative effort with Charles for a history reader by Macmillan. This was followed by 40 illustrations for Frederick Marryat's Japhet in Search of a father (Macmillan, London. 1885). From then on he was illustrating books and magazines almost up until his death.

Henry married Doris Joan Pegram (12 June 1886 – 1 November 1979 at St. Paul's in Hampstead on 7 September 1912. Doris was the eldest daughter of the Henry's cousin, sculptor Henry Alfred Pegram and Alice Lambert (born 13 January 1865), described as an artist's model in the 1881 census. Both Houfe and Kirkpatrick state that Doris was the sister of illustrator Fred Pegram. but close examination of the census returns show that Thomas Weely Pegram was Richard's maternal grandfather, Fred's paternal grandfather, and Doris's paternal great-grandfather. Therefore, Doris was a daughter of Fred's first cousin, and Henry was Fred's first cousin. (Note: Doris was the first cousin, once removed, of both Richard and Fred.)

The couple lived at a house that Henry had designed at "Woodstock", 63 Storey's Way, in Cambridge. After the Second World War, the couple move back to Arundine House, which had now been divided into three apartments. They lived in Flat 2 and Flat 3 with their two daughters. The couple had three children:

- Margaret Marion Brock (12 November 1913 – 3 January 1967) She attended the Perse School for Girls in Cambridge. Marion was heavily involved with the Women's Institute in Cambridge. Marion never married and she was still living in one of the Arundine house flats when she died suddenly and unexpectedly in Addenbrookes Hospital, Cambridge) on 3 January 1967.
- Joan Penelope Brock (11 February 1917 – 21 September 1992) Like her sister she attended the Perse School for Girls. Joan was working for a firm of picture-framers in London when she returned to look after her ageing mother.
- Bevis Henry Brock (22 February 1921 – 7 November 2005) Bevis attended The Leys School and then Clare College, Cambridge to study medicine, and went on to take his clinical training at King's College Hospital and eventually qualified as an orthopaedic surgeon. He married Margaret Dorothy Cave (5 May 1919 – 29 May 1992), the superintending physiotherapist at Kings. Unfortunately, Dorothy contracted rubella while she was pregnant, and Christopher Bevis Brock (27 November 1946 – ) was born deaf, dumb, and blind. (Note: These are the terms which Margaret herself used to describe her son, with the later addition of educationally subnormal.) Margaret founded the Rubella Group charity, which was later renamed to Sense. Margaret got an OBE for her work with the charity, and she published a biography of Christopher Christopher: A Silent Life (Macmillan, London. 1975).

The couple had one other child, a daughter, Elizabeth A Brock (26 August 1950) who followed in her mother's footsteps by training as a physiotherapist, but contracted Multiple Sclerosis and died in her forties. After Margaret dies, he married a long-serving sister in the Salisbury hospitals, but she also predeceased him.

The Brocks were so much in demand that they employed no agent until after the First World War. Illustrated gift books were in decline after the war and were finally extinguished by the financial crash of 1929 – 1930. Over the course of his life, Henry illustrated over 550 books. Some of these books were illustrated in collaboration with others, but it still represents an enormous workload, especially when all of his other work is taken into account, not just the 415 illustrations for Punch but all of the illustrations for magazines and serial stories.

Henry was living at the Arundine House address (in flat 2 of 35 Madingley Road) when he died on 21 July 1960. His eyesight had been worsening since the Second World War, and his daughter-in-law reported him as making, with difficulty, a sketch of her deaf, dumb, and blind son, and then saying that it was questionable as to which of them had the worse eyesight. Henry's sight continued to deteriorate as he grew older. Doris lives on until 1 November 1979, and was one of the principle informants for the biography of the Brocks by Kelly.

==== Punch illustrations by Henry ====
The following medical-themed Punch illustrations are by courtesy of the Wellcome Collection. Henry had 415 illustrations published in Punch from 19 July 1905 to 6 March 1940.

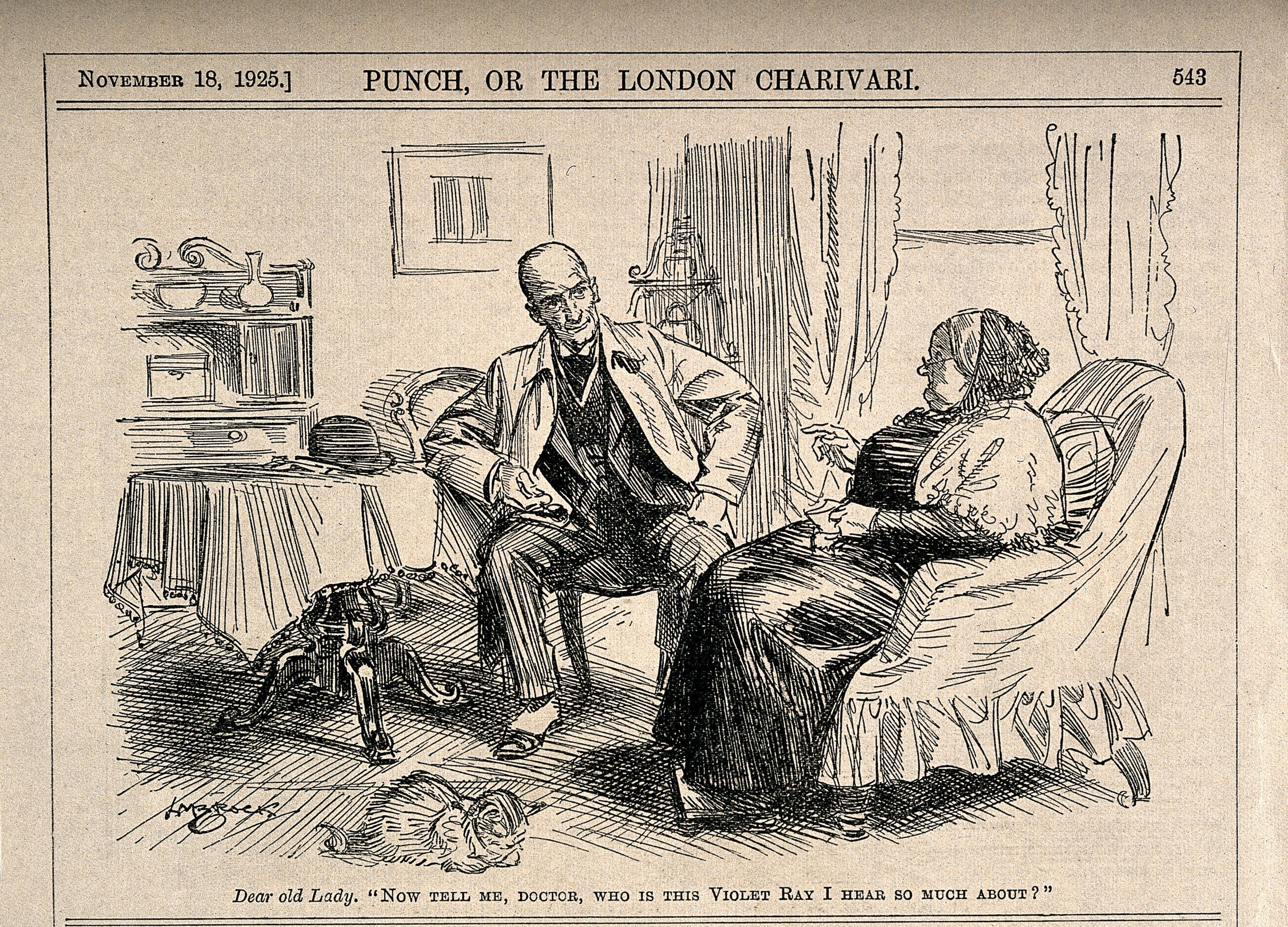

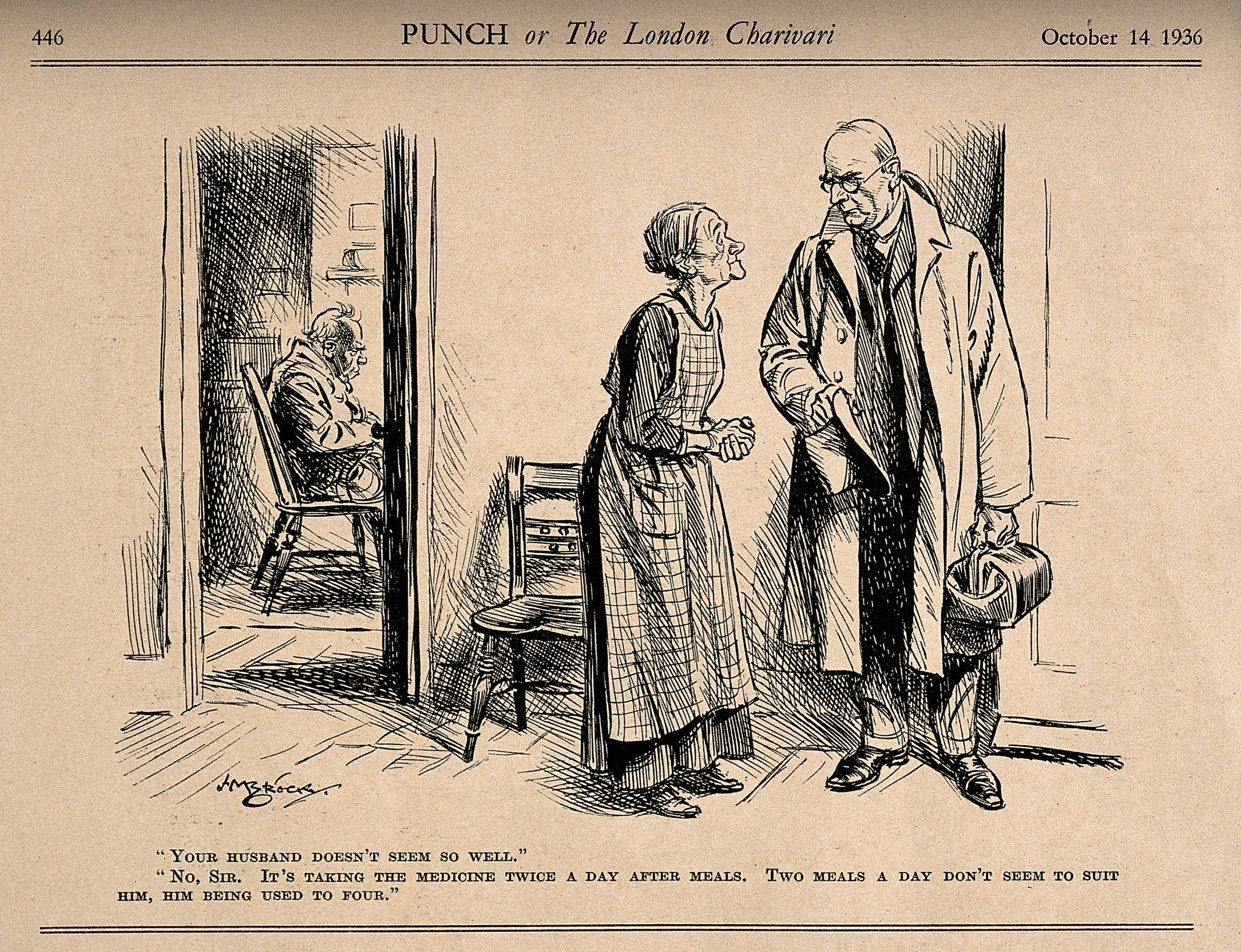

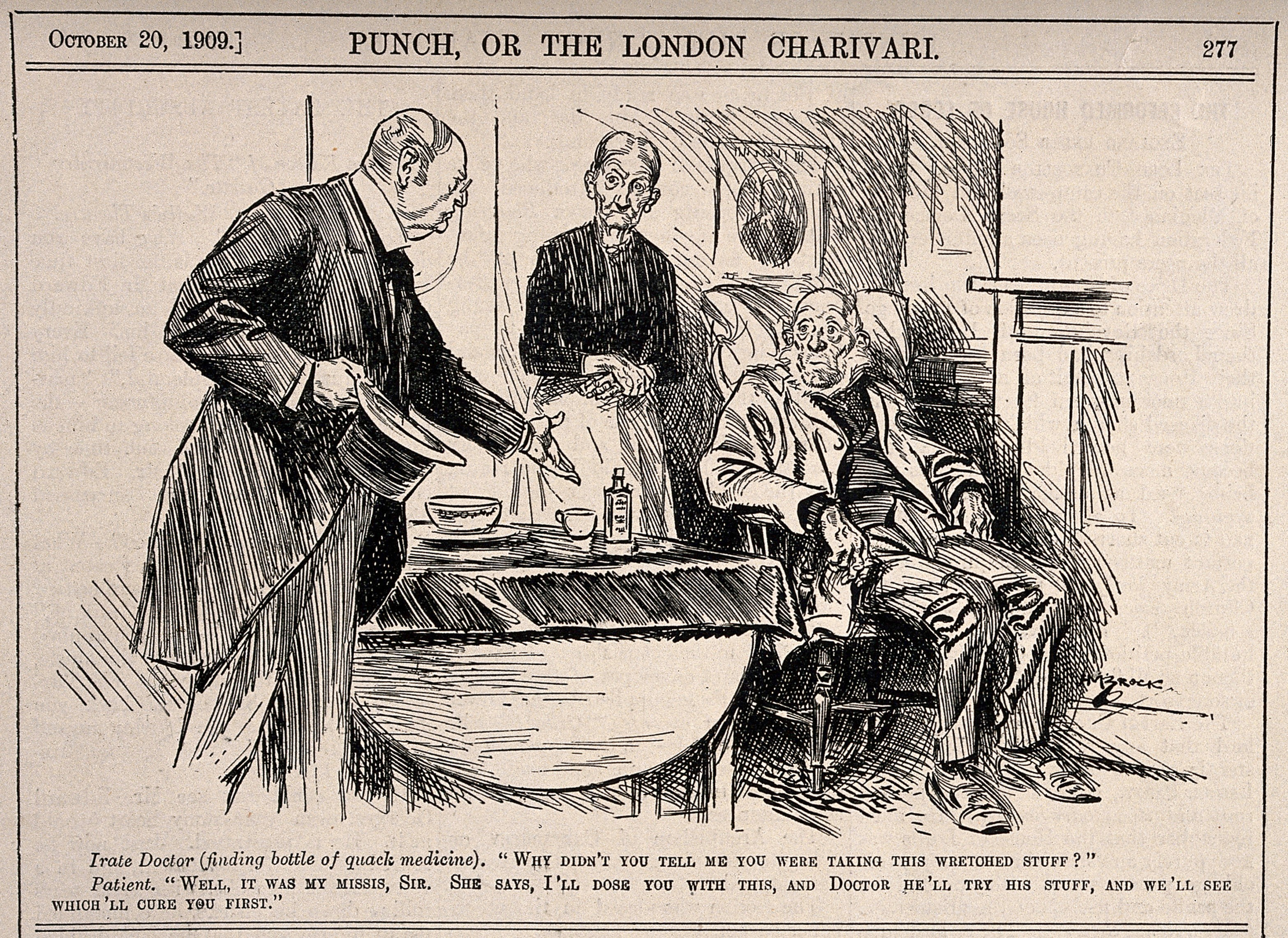

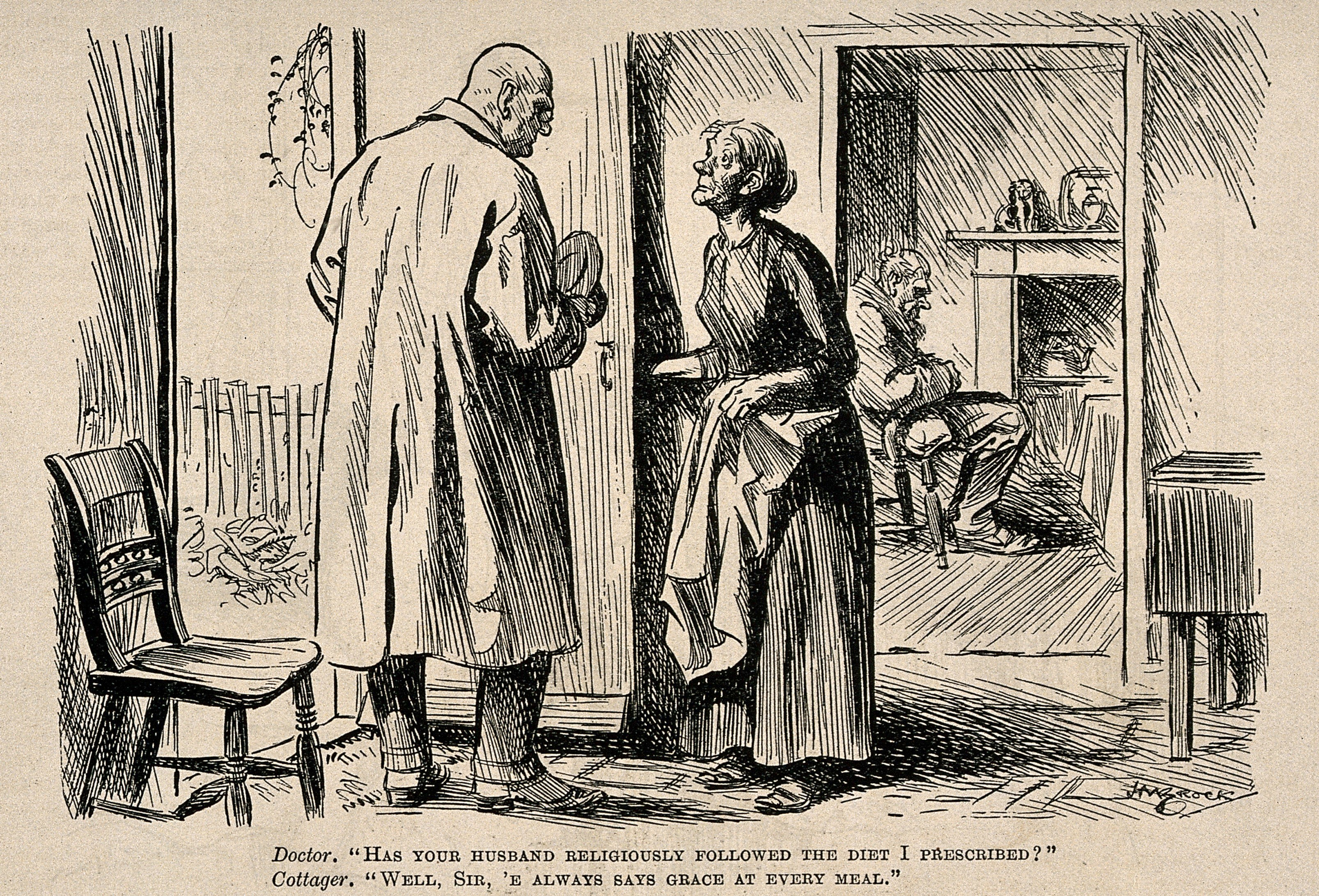

=== Katharine Alison (1876–1967) ===
Katherine Alison "Kate" Brock was born on Sunday, 10 December 1876. She attended the Girl's Higher Grade school. She has some artistic ability as she took 1st Class in Model Drawing at the Cambridge School of Art in 1893, and also passed Geometrical Drawing. In 1895 she won prizes both for a study of flowers from nature and a prize for success in examinations at the School of Art. Katharine might have become an artist like her brothers, but as Kelly notes, in the manner of the time she stayed at home as the mainstay of the household as her mother grew old and infirm. (Note: The 1911 census shows that household included a sick-nurse, presumably for Katharine's mother, who died in 1912, but was ill enough to require a sick nurse in 1911.)

Katharine was very involved with the Chapel on St. Andrew's Street, Cambridge. She was the president of the St. Andrew's Girls Guild, supported fundraising efforts, and was a regular performer at social functions, manning a stall at the 1903 Puritan Bazaar with her sister Bertha and featuring in the concert afterwards with Charles and Thomas. Katharine not only did the sweets with her sister-in-law Annie Dudley, but also contributed to the evening concert at the sale of work for the Baptist Missionary Society in 1908. Katharine sang at the function on 12 March 1909, together with Gertrude Alice Struggles, who later married Katharine's brother-in-law, Dudley James Smith, who played in a quartet that evening with his future wife, and with Katharine's brother Thomas.

Katharine wrote poetry and saw it published in magazines, and newspapers.

Katharine married her brother-in-law, Harold Lindsey Smith (31 May 1880 – 29 September 1961), a bookseller's assistant dealing with overseas correspondence, in the third quarter of 1911, nine years after her brother Charles had married Harold's sister Annie Dudley. Like the Brocks, the Smiths were a close family and, after the death of the third sibling Dudley James Smith (18 December 1883 – 18 August 1917) in Flanders during World War I, the electoral register shows Harold and Katharine lived next door to his widow Gertrude Alice (Struggles) (4 October 1888 – 14 August 1974). (Note: As a member of the middle-class, Gertude qualified for an "alternative pension" worth twice the normal pension, through the system which took pre-war earnings into account in determining the size of a soldier's pension.)

Harold and Katharine had two daughters, Alison Lindsey (24 July 1912 – 26 March 2006), who married Arthur Harvey, an engineer, and Barbara Noel (25 December 1913 – 31 July 2000), a poet who published at least four volumes of poetry. Barbara married the mathematician Bernard Scott (27 Aug 1915 – 7 November 1993). in Cambridge, England, during the third quarter of 1939. The couple had four sons and the marriage was dissolved in 1972. (Note: Scott had changed his name from Schultz in 1939. His family were Jewish fur and skin merchants in Golders Green in London. He worked on code breaking at Bletchley Park during the Second World War. He was the founding Professor of Mathematics at Sussex University, from 1962 to 1980.) Barbara died in Burgess Hill, West Sussex on 31 July 2000, and was cremated in Cambridge on 16 August 2000, with her family taking away the ashes. Barbara's son Colin Richard and his wife Diane were her executors, and her son Godfrey Peter, then living in Ann Arbor Michigan, as her literary executor.

Katharine died in Lewes, Sussex on 31 December 1967. She was the last and the longest lived of the seven Brock children. She was cremated at the Cambridge City Council's crematorium at Dry Drayton on 5 January 1968 and her ashes were scattered in the crematorium garden.

==== Example of a poem by Katharine Alison Brock ====
This poem, "The Long Night", by Katharine, appeared in the Sunday Magazine and was republished in several newspapers.

Night spreads her cool, dark wings o'er all the land,
And under them I fain would fall asleep;
Fain would find rest for weary heart and hand,
And eyes that now unwilling vigil keep.

Yet, o'er and o'er, the doings of the day
With wearying insistence fill the brain;
And hour by hour the long night steals away,
And still I wake, and seek for sleep in vain.

The window shows square of lesser dark,
And frames a space of star-besprinkled sky;
So small a space, and yet how many a spark,
Each spark a world, gleams there before mine eye.

Countless they seem, yet, thinking to beguile
Some of the tedious moments left of night,
Idly I undertake the task, and while
I know it hopeless, count those points of light.

When lo! it slowly dawns upon mind
That this is sunlight creeping o'er the bed
And I, no longer weary, wake to find
Sleep was guest, all unknown till she fled.

=== Bertha Matilda (1879–1939) ===
Bertha Matilda was born at 4 Perowne Street, Cambridge on Sunday 7 December 1879. She was the baby of the family, but very little is known about her.

The Electoral Register shows Bertha and Thomas both living at Arundine House in 1935, but at the time of her death she was living at 15 Howes Place, Cambridge, again with Thomas. Charles's Widow was also at that address in 1939. Bertha died there, after a short illness, on 28 February 1939, and was buried in Histon Road cemetery together with Charles, who died 12 months before her and Thomas who died 8 months after her.
