= Henry Alfred Pegram =

British sculptor (1862–1937)

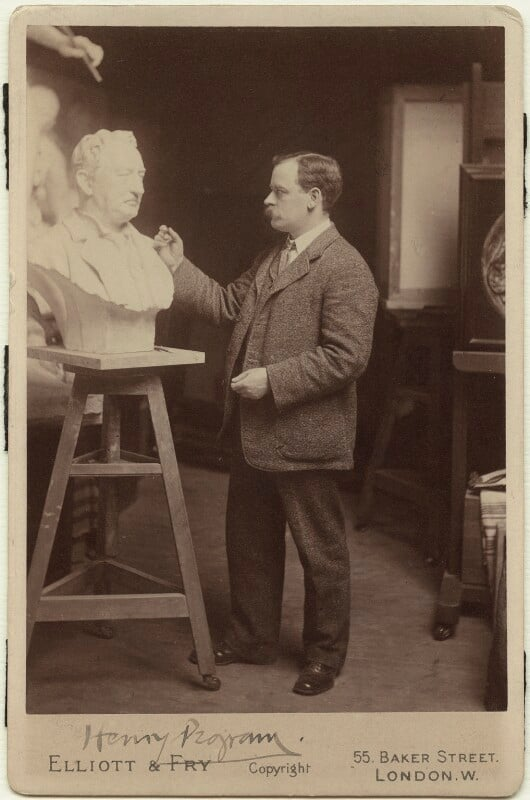
Pegram c. 1903

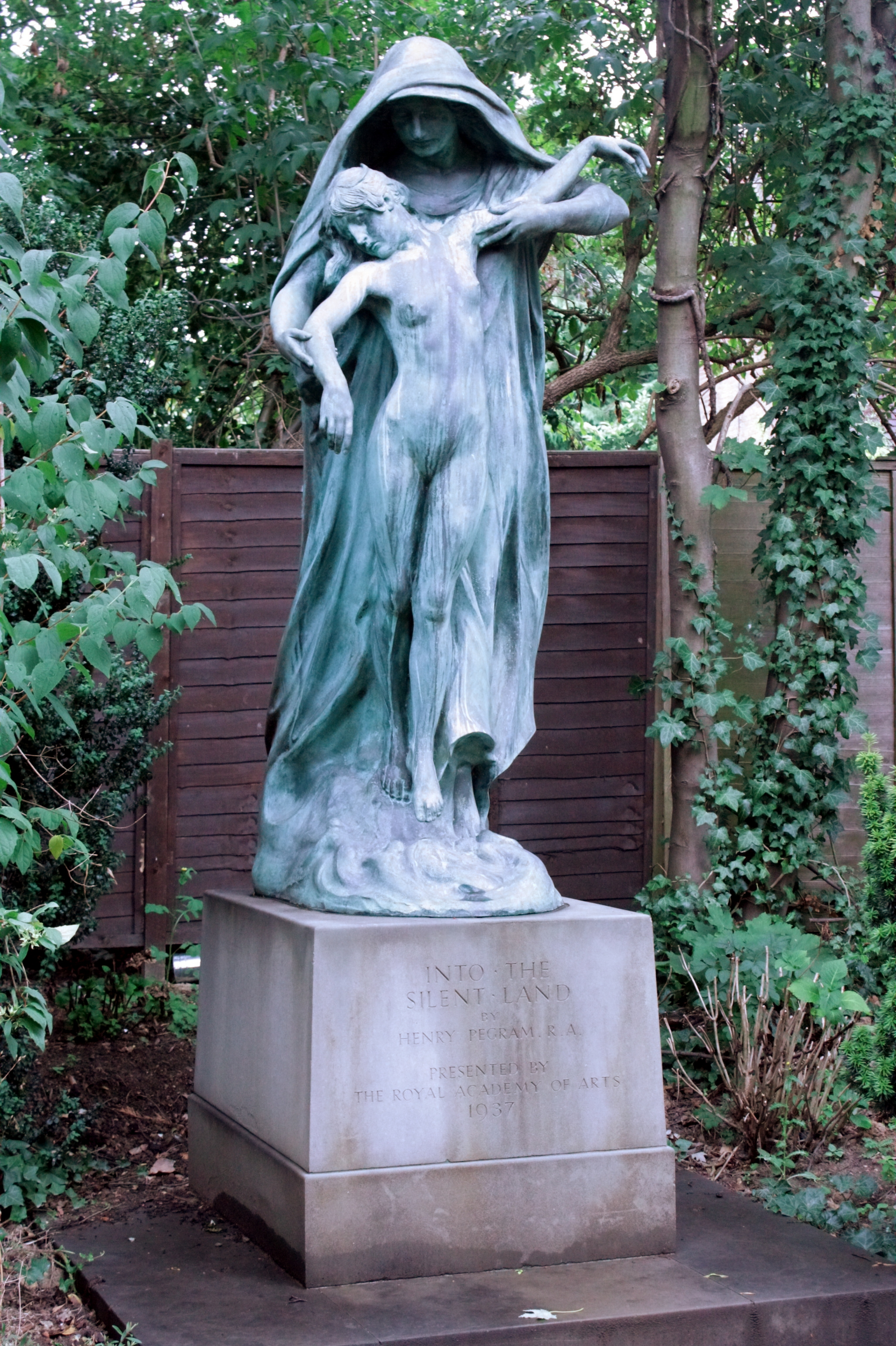
Into the Silent Land by Henry Pegram, Golders Green Crematorium

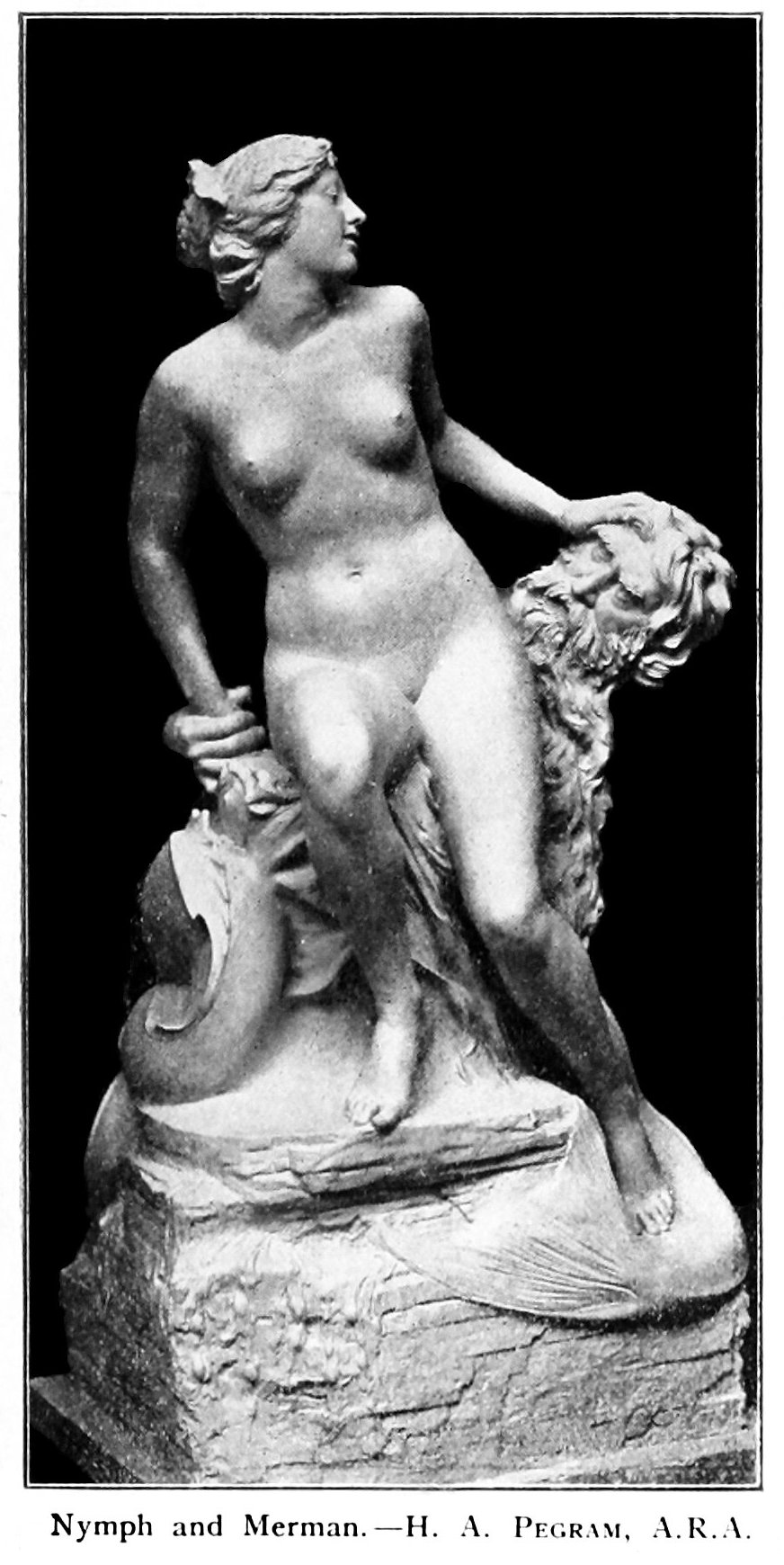
Pegram's Nymph and Merman

Henry Alfred Pegram RA (27 July 1862 – 26 March 1937) was a British sculptor and exponent of the New Sculpture movement.

== Life ==
Pegram was born in London and received his first artistic education at the West London School of Art. Already in 1881 and in 1883 he won prizes at the National Art Competitions. In 1881, he entered the Royal Academy schools, where he again won prizes in 1882, 1884, and 1886. In 1887 he left the school and worked until 1891 as assistant to Hamo Thornycroft. He became a member of the Art Workers' Guild in 1890, an Associate of the Royal Academy in 1904 and finally a Royal Academician in 1922. From 1890, Pegram was commissioned for numerous building decorations and statues. In 1913, he was one of the ten sculptors selected to work on the city hall of Cardiff, for which he sculpted the figure of Llewelyn the Last.

Pegram was a cousin to the Brocks of Cambridge, a family with four brothers who worked as painters and illustrators in a large studio at their family home in Cambridge. His eldest daughter, Doris Joan Pegram (12 June 1886 – 1 November 1979), married one of the brothers, the artist and illustrator H. M. Brock RI (11 July 1875 – 21 July 1960) on 7 September 1912. The illustrator Fred Pegram RI (19 December 1870 – 23 August 1937), and his brother, the sculptor and medallist Alfred Bertram Pegram (17 January 1873 – 14 January 1941) were first cousins to both Henry Alfred and the Brocks.

Henry Alfred Pegram died of a cerebral haemorrhage, on 26 March 1937 in his home, 72 Belsize Park Gardens, Belsize Park, Hampstead, London.

== Prizes ==
- Bronze medal at the Paris International Exhibition of 1889 (for Death Liberating a Prisoner)
- Gold medal at Dresden, 1897 (for The Last Song)
- Silver medal at the Paris International Exhibition of 1900 (for a life-size plaster cast of Sibylla Fatidica, a marble version was presented in 1904 to the Tate.)

== Selected works ==
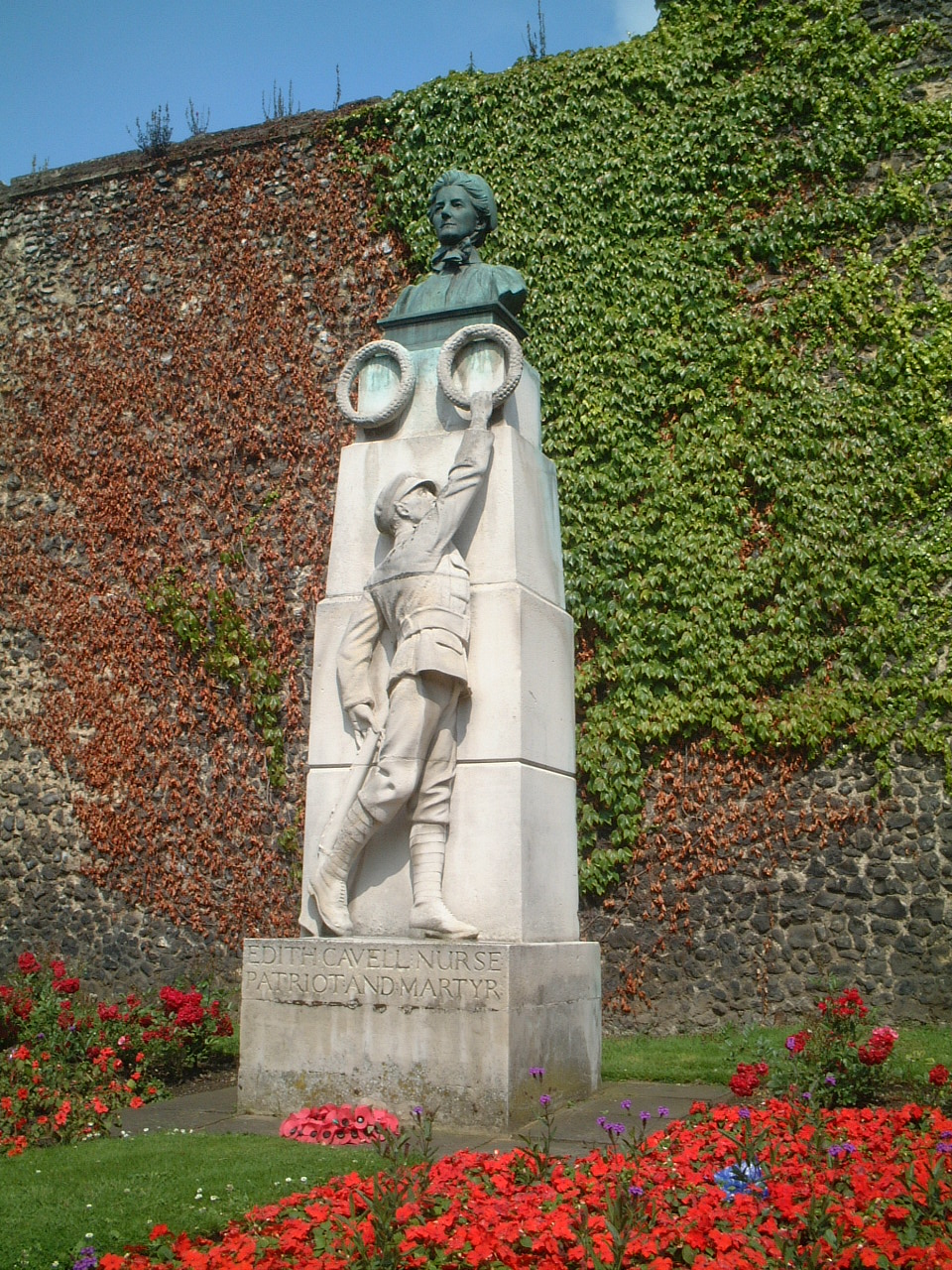
Edith Cavell monument at Norwich Cathedral

- Industry and Britannica, entrance of the Imperial Institute, London. (1891–1892)
- Ignis Fatuus or Misleading Light (1889).
- The Last Song (1897).
- Bronze candelabra in St. Paul's, London (1897).
- Sibylla Fatidica (1900–1904).
- Monument to Ninon Michaelis at Kensal Green Cemetery (approx 1901).
- Reliefs at St Paul's Girls' School, Brook Green. (1903)
- "The Bather" friezes at Buckingham Gate no. 20, Westminster, London (now the High Commission of Eswatini).
- Statue of Thomas Browne in Norwich (1905).
- Into the Silent Land (1905). Gifted to Golders Green Crematorium by the Royal Society of Arts in 1937
- By the Waters of Babylon (1906).
- Statue of Sir John Logan Campbell in Auckland (unveiled 24 May 1906).
- Stone frieze at the Aston Webb building of the Birmingham University (1907).
- Statue of Cecil Rhodes in Cape Town (1910).
- Oriel College, Oxford, Rhodes Building, group of seven statues including Rhodes, Edward VII and George V (1911)
- Nereus and Galatea (1911).
- Chance (1913).
- Figure of Llewelyn the Last at Cardiff City Hall.
- Ophelia and the River Gods (1914).
- Edith Cavell monument in Norwich (1917).
- Victory on the War memorial at Cunard building, Liverpool.
- Hylas (1922), installed in 1933 in the Rose garden, Regent's Park, London.
- Preston Cenotaph in Market Square, Preston, Lancashire (1926).
- Statue of Sir Robert Hart in Shanghai.
