= A Cornish Romance =

1912 British film by Sidney Northcote

- Directed by: Sidney Northcote
- Written by: Harold Brett
- Starring: Wallett Waller; Dorothy Foster; O'Neill Farrell; Sidney Northcote
- Production company: British and Colonial Kinematograph Company
- Release date: May 1912
- Running time: 1 reel
- Country: United Kingdom
- Language: Silent

A Cornish Romance is a 1912 British silent crime thriller film directed by Sidney Northcote and starring Wallett Waller, Dorothy Foster and O'Neil Farrell.

== Cast ==
- Wallett Waller as Sir Ralph Chetwynd
- Dorothy Foster as Sybilla Chetwynd
- O'Neil Farrell as Jules Marx
- Sidney Northcote as Dark Davey
- Ruth Sampson as Miss Barton
- Fred Percy
