= Stable Companions =

1922 film

- Directed by: Albert Ward
- Written by: Walter Summers
- Produced by: G.B. Samuelson
- Starring: Clive Brook; Lillian Hall-Davis; Robert English; Arthur Pusey
- Production company: G.B. Samuelson Productions
- Distributed by: Jury Films
- Release date: June 1922
- Running time: 5,960 feet
- Country: United Kingdom
- Languages: Silent; English intertitles

Stable Companions is a 1922 British silent sports film directed by Albert Ward and starring Clive Brook, Lillian Hall-Davis and Robert English. It is set in the world of horse racing.

== Cast ==
- Clive Brook as James Pilkington
- Lillian Hall-Davis
- Robert English as Sir Horace Pilkington
- Arthur Pusey
- Fred Mason
- James Wigham
- Thomas Walters

== See also ==
- List of films about horses
- List of films about horse racing

== Bibliography ==
- Low, Rachael. History of the British Film, 1918-1929. George Allen & Unwin, 1971.
