= Fred Pegram =

English illustrator and cartoonist (1870–1937)

1926 photograph of Fred Pegram by Howard Coster

Frederick Pegram (19 December 1870 – 23 August 1937) was an English illustrator and cartoonist who produced work for The Pall Mall Gazette, Punch Magazine, The Idler, Illustrated London News, The Tatler, and The Daily Chronicle. He studied under Fred Brown and spent some time in Paris. He also painted, drew pencil portraits, did watercolours, used chalk and pastel, and produced etchings. He became one of the most consistent of magazine illustrators.

== Biography ==
The son of Alfred Pegram, a cabinet maker, Frederick enrolled at the Westminster School of Art aged 15. Among his fellow students were Henry Tonks, Aubrey Beardsley and Maurice Greiffenhagen. Pegram served as Special Constable at Buckingham Palace during World War I. His draughtsmanship was widely acclaimed and he produced the artwork for Mackintosh's Toffee advertisements, Player's, Ronuk Wax Polish, Selfridges, and some versions of the iconic Kodak Girl. Between 1889 and 1904 he exhibited regularly at the Royal Academy, and in 1925 was elected a member of the Royal Institute of Painters in Watercolours, where he was a frequent exhibitor. (Note: Pegram exhibited as follows: one work at the Chenil and New Chenil Galleries, eight works at the Connell & Sons Gallery, 14 works at the Glasgow Institute of the Fine Arts, one work at the International Society of Sculptors, Painters and Gravers, four works at the Walker Art Gallery, Liverpool, four works at the Royal Society of Portrait Painters, eight works at the Royal Academy, and 45 works at the Royal Institute of Painters in Water Colours.) He also designed posters for the Underground Group. In 1918 he moved into one of 15 artist's studios that were known as 'The Avenue', located at 76 Fulham Road.

One of the most enjoyable experiences I have had was under the hospitable roof of Mr. Hall Caine, when I went to make the sketches for 'The Manxman' illustrations, which appeared in 'The Queen', in which paper the novel was first published. The popular novelist is a host par excellence, and I had a very good time.

— Fred Pegram

He died from lung cancer on 23 August 1937.

The sculptor and medallist Alfred Bertram Pegram (17 January 1873 – 14 January 1941) was one of Frederick's younger brothers. Frederick and Alfred were cousins to the four Brock brothers, all illustrators, who worked together in their studio in Cambridge. Frederick, Alfred, and the Brock brothers were all first cousins to the sculptor Henry Alfred Pegram.

== Books illustrated ==
The following is not an exhaustive list.

- Sybil, or The Two Nations by Benjamin Disraeli, Macmillan and Co. (London, 1895)
- Mr Midshipman Easy by Captain Frederick Marryat, Macmillan and Co. (London, 1896) as part of their decorative gilt-fiction series
- Poor Jack by Captain Frederick Marryat, Macmillan and Co. (London, 1897/1899)
- Masterman Ready, or the Wreck of the Pacific by Captain Frederick Marryat, Macmillan and Co. (London, 1897 edition, featuring 39 full-page line illustrations)
- At the Rising of the Moon: Irish Stories and Studies by Frank Mathew, Christopher (London, 1898)
- London's World Fair by Charles Pascoe, (London, 1898).
- The Orange Girl by Walter Besant, Chatto & Windus (London, 1899)
- Martin Chuzzlewit by Charles Dickens, Blackie & Son Imperial Edition (London, 1900)
- Tea-table Talk by Jerome K. Jerome, Hutchinson & Co. (London, 1903)
- The Bride of Lammermoor by Sir Walter Scott, Macmillan and Co. (London, 1903)
- A Lost Leader by E. Phillips Oppenheim, Ward, Lock & Co. (London, 1906)
- The Missioner by E. Phillips Oppenheim, Ward, Lock & Co. (London, 1907)
- Marriage à la Mode by Mrs. Humphry Ward, Doubleday, Page & Company (New York/London, 1909)

== Gallery ==
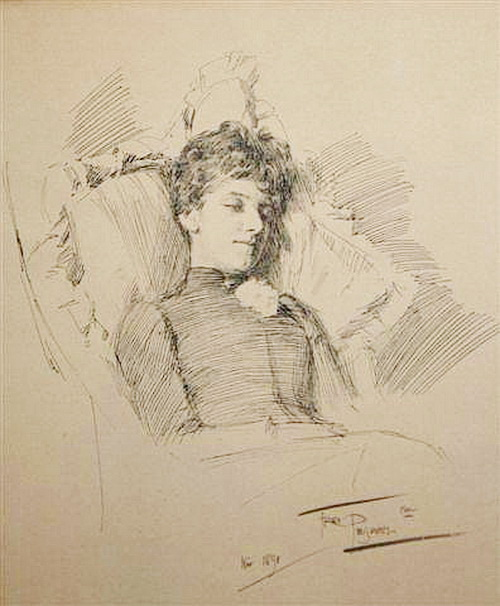
The Artist's Wife, 1891

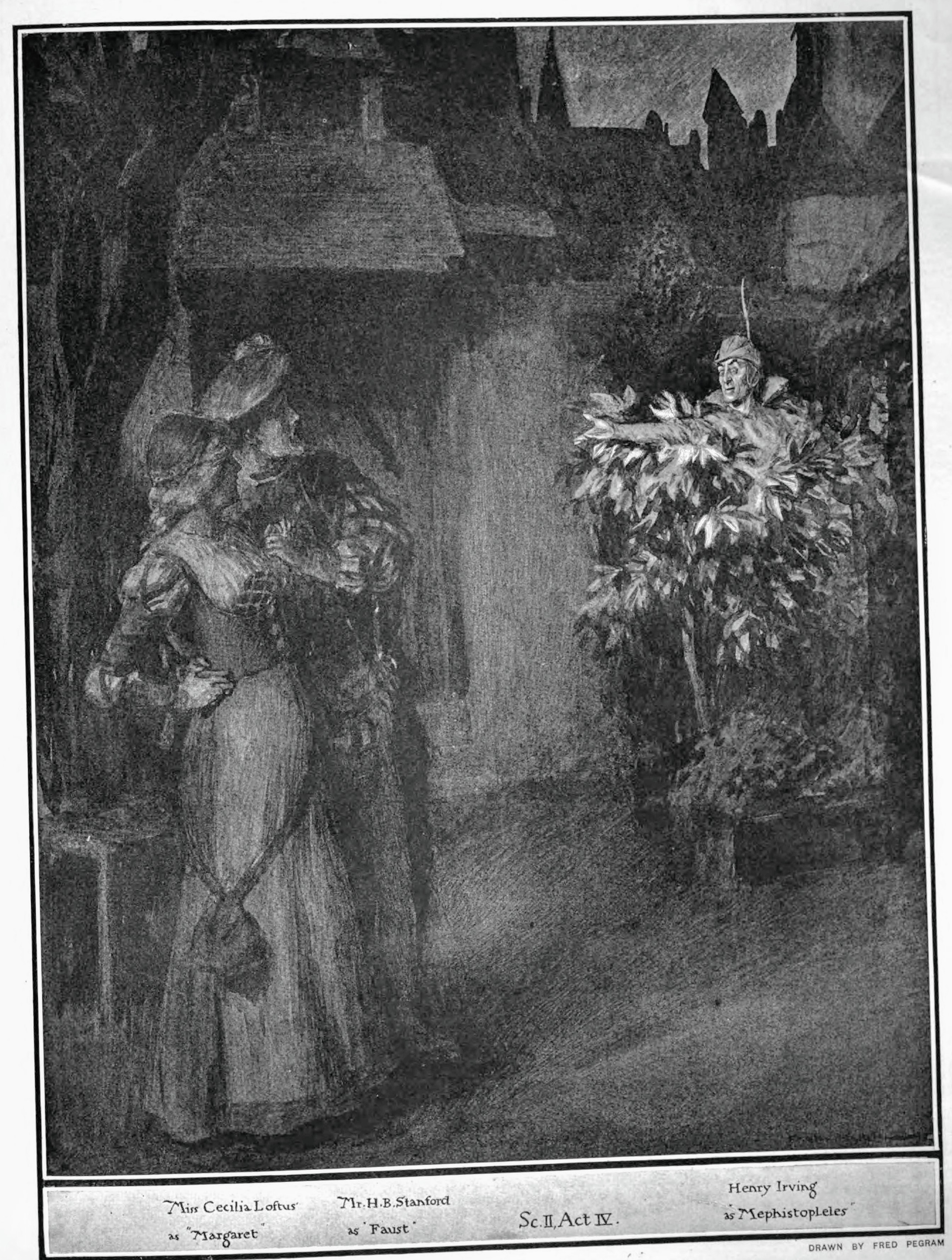
The garden scene in Faust, Act II, Scene IV, at the Lyceum Theatre, London, 1902

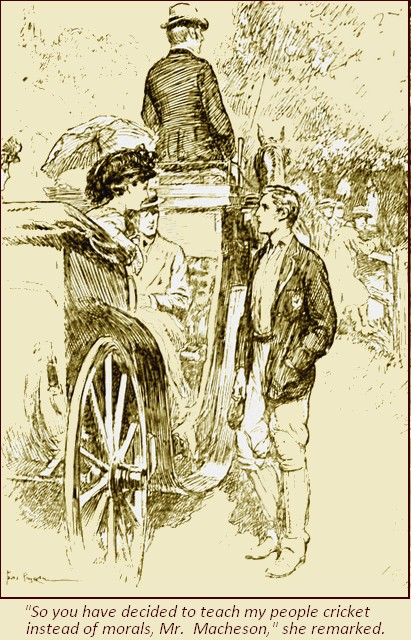
Illustration from The Missioner by E. Phillips Oppenheim, first UK book edition: Ward, Lock & Co., London, 1908

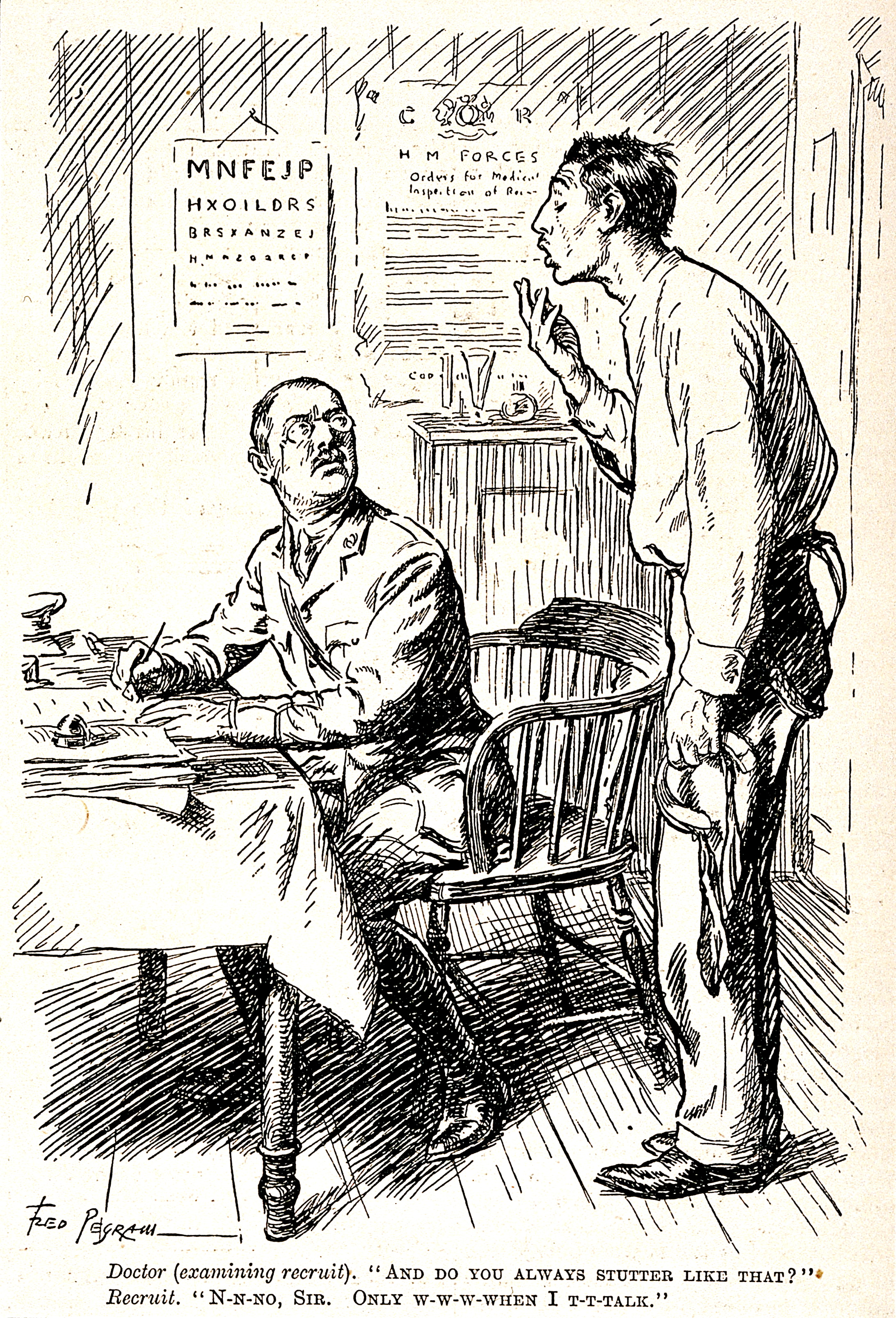
A doctor examines a military recruit suffering from a speech disorder, wood engraving, 1916

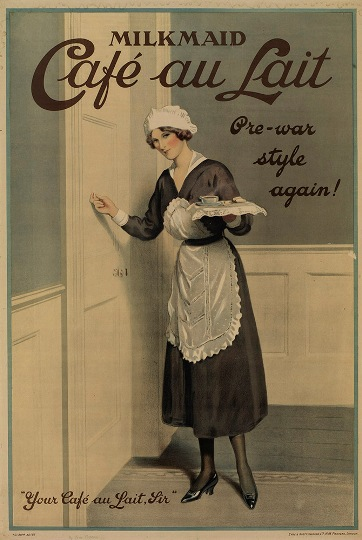
Advertisement for "Cafe au Lait", 1921

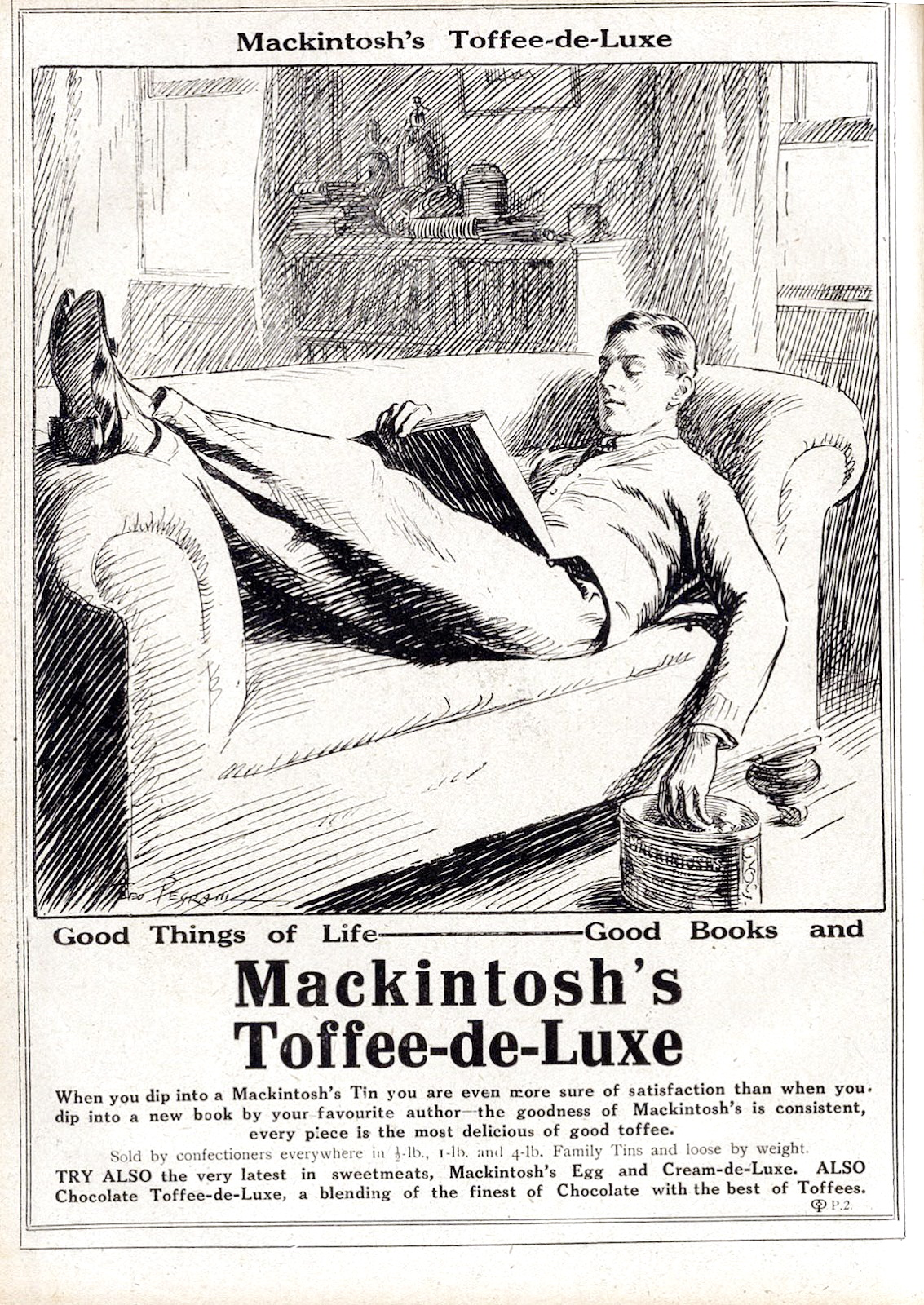
Advertisement for Mackintosh's "Toffee-de-Luxe", 1921

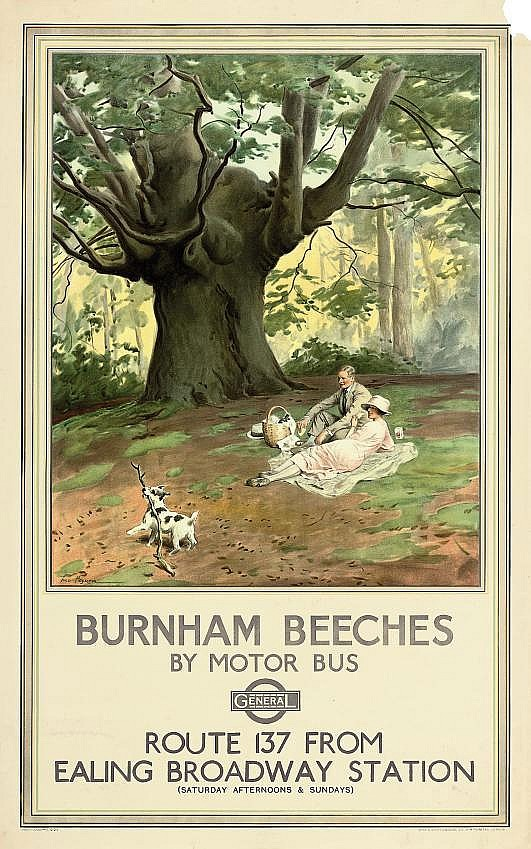
Burnham Beeches by Motor Bus, lithograph in colours, printed by Eyre & Spottiswoode Ltd., London, 1923
