= A Lost Leader (novel) =

1906 novel by E. Phillips Oppenheim

- First US edition
- Author: E. Phillips Oppenheim
- Language: English
- Genre: Drama
- Publisher: Ward, Lock; Little, Brown (US)
- Publication date: 1906
- Publication place: United Kingdom
- Media type: Print

A Lost Leader is a 1906 politically-themed novel by British writer E. Phillips Oppenheim. Later better known for his thrillers, it was one of several novels Oppenheim wrote at the time centred on "social political life". In it, a potential Liberal Party politician, Lawrence Mannering, is lured back from his country estate to London to revive the party's fortunes.

== Adaptation ==
In 1922 it was adapted into a British silent film of the same title directed by George Ridgwell and starring Robert English, Dorothy Fane and George Bellamy.

== Bibliography ==
- Goble, Alan. The Complete Index to Literary Sources in Film. Walter de Gruyter, 1999.
- Reilly, John M. Twentieth Century Crime & Mystery Writers. Springer, 2015.
- Server, Lee. Encyclopedia of Pulp Fiction Writers. Infobase Publishing, 2014.
