= A Lost Leader (film) =

1922 British silent drama film

- Directed by: George Ridgwell
- Written by: William J. Elliott
- Based on: A Lost Leader by E. Phillips Oppenheim
- Starring: Robert English; Dorothy Fane; George Bellamy
- Production company: Stoll Pictures
- Distributed by: Stoll Pictures
- Release date: September 1922
- Running time: 77 minutes
- Country: United Kingdom
- Languages: Silent; English intertitles

A Lost Leader is a 1922 British silent drama film directed by George Ridgwell and starring Robert English, Dorothy Fane, and George Bellamy. It is based on the 1906 novel of the same title by E. Phillips Oppenheim.

== Cast ==
- Robert English as Lawrence Mannering
- Dorothy Fane as Duchess Berenice
- Lily Iris as Blanche Fillimore
- Lionel d'Aragon as Sir Leslie Borrowden
- George Bellamy as John Fardell
- Teddy Arundell as Henry Rochester
- Cecil Ward as Lord Redford

== Bibliography ==
- Goble, Alan. The Complete Index to Literary Sources in Film. Walter de Gruyter, 1999.
- Low, Rachael. The History of British Film (Volume 3): The History of the British Film 1914 - 1918. Routledge, 2013.
