= Robert English (actor) =

British actor (1878?–1941)

Robert English was a British actor born 2 December 1878 (though IBDB gives the year as 1874).

Robert English was born in Cheltenham, Gloucester, England, UK. He served in the South African War and also in World War I. He held the D.S.O. and Croix de Guerre and retired as Lieutenant Colonel, which helped him play military roles in a number of films. He played rugby (he was six feet two inches) and was in the Gloucester County cricket team.

In 1920 he started work in British silent films and later went on to talkies.

He died on 18 August 1941 in London.

== Partial filmography ==
- The Fruitful Vine (1921)
- The Four Feathers (1921)
- The Broken Road (1921)
- The Crimson Circle (1922)
- Stable Companions (1922)
- A Lost Leader (1922)
- The Truants (1922)
- Guy Fawkes (1923)
- Out to Win (1923)
- This Freedom (1923)
- Monte Carlo (1925)
- A Woman Redeemed (1927)
- A Knight in London (1929)
- The American Prisoner (1929)
- A Honeymoon Adventure (1931)
- Commissionaire (1933)
- Honeymoon for Three (1935) as Herbert Denver
- Guilty Melody (1936)
- The Secret of Stamboul (1936)
- Educated Evans (1936)
- Waterloo (1937)
- Sam Small Leaves Town (1937)
- The Song of the Road (1937)
- Talking Feet (1937)
- Mrs. Pym of Scotland Yard (1940)
