= Dorothy Fane (actress) =

British actress (1889–1976)

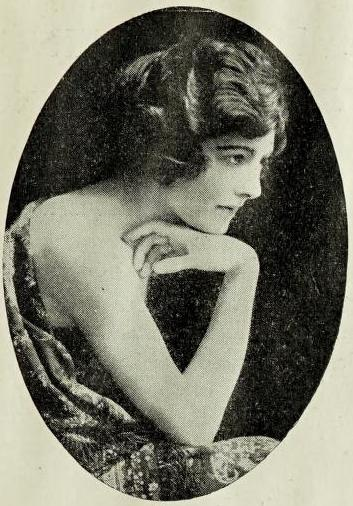
- Dorothy Fane, from a 1922 publication.
- Born: 1889; United Kingdom
- Died: 1976 (aged 86–87)
- Years active: 1916–32 (films)

Dorothy Fane (1889–1976), nee Foster, was a British actress. She is sometimes credited as Dorothy Fayne. Fane appeared frequently in the British theatre and silent films.

== Selected filmography ==
=== Dorothy Foster ===
- Hamlet (1912)
- The Gentleman Ranker (1912)
- The Fishergirl of Cornwall (1912)
- A Cornish Romance (1912)
- Lieutenant Daring and the Labour Riots (1913)

=== Dorothy Fane ===
- The Picture of Dorian Gray (1916)
- The Bigamist (1916)
- The Flag Lieutenant (1919)
- The Pride of the Fancy (1920) - Hilda Douglas
- In the Night (1920) - Estelle
- Daniel Deronda (1921) - Gwendolen Harleith
- Corinthian Jack (1921) - Lady Barbara
- The Harper's Mystery (1921)
- Married Life (1921)
- The Princess of New York (1921)- Violet Meretham
- Laughter and Tears (1921) - Countess Maltakoff
- The Bonnie Brier Bush (1921) - Kate Carnegie
- The Lonely Lady of Grosvenor Square (1922) - Anne-Marie Marney
- Bulldog Drummond (1922)
- Creation (1922)
- A Lost Leader (1922)
- The Loves of Mary, Queen of Scots (1923) - Mary Beaton
- Lights of London (1923) - Belle
- The Vortex (1928) - Helen Saville
- Threads (1932)
- The Innocents of Chicago (1932)

== Bibliography ==
- Kear, Lynn & King, James. Evelyn Brent: The Life and Films of Hollywood's Lady Crook. McFarland & Co, 2009.
