= The Great Impersonation =

The Great Impersonation may refer to:

- The Great Impersonation (novel), a 1920 novel by the British writer E. Phillips Oppenheim
- The Great Impersonation (1921 film), an American silent film adaptation
- The Great Impersonation (1935 film), an American film adaptation
- The Great Impersonation (1942 film), an American film adaptation
