= Golden Web =

Golden Web may refer to:

- The Golden Web (novel), 1910 mystery novel by E. Phillips Oppenheim,
- The Golden Web (1920 film), British silent mystery film
- The Golden Web (1926 film), American silent mystery film
- Golden Web (company), Ghanaian company
