= Bernard Brown =

Bernard Brown may refer to:

- Bernard B. Brown (1898–1981), American sound engineer and composer
- Bernard Brown (actor) (born 1933), British actor

== See also ==
- The Mystery of Mr. Bernard Brown (novel), an 1896 novel by E. Phillips Oppenheim
- The Mystery of Mr. Bernard Brown (film), a 1921 film adaptation directed by Sinclair Hill
