= The Mystery of Mr. Bernard Brown =

The Mystery of Mr. Bernard Brown may refer to:

- The Mystery of Mr. Bernard Brown (novel), an 1896 novel by E. Phillips Oppenheim
- The Mystery of Mr. Bernard Brown (film), a 1921 film adaptation directed by Sinclair Hill
