= The Great Impersonation (1935 film) =

1935 film by Alan Crosland

- Directed by: Alan Crosland
- Written by: Eve Greene; Frank Wead
- Based on: The Great Impersonation by E. Phillips Oppenheim
- Produced by: Edmund Grainger
- Starring: Edmund Lowe; Valerie Hobson; Wera Engels; Murray Kinnell
- Cinematography: Milton R. Krasner
- Edited by: Philip Cahn
- Music by: Heinz Roemheld; Clifford Vaughan
- Production company: Universal Pictures
- Distributed by: Universal Pictures
- Release date: December 9, 1935
- Running time: 68 minutes
- Country: United States
- Language: English

The Great Impersonation is a 1935 Universal Pictures American drama film directed by Alan Crosland and starring Edmund Lowe, Valerie Hobson and Wera Engels. It was adapted from the 1920 novel The Great Impersonation by E. Phillips Oppenheim. The film bears some aesthetic similarities to the Universal horror films of the 1930s. Two other film versions of the story were produced with the same title in 1921 and 1942.

== Plot ==
Before World War I, Sir Everard Dominey, a drunken upper-class Englishman, encounters an old acquaintance, the sinister German arms dealer Baron Leopold von Ragostein, in Africa. The two men are identical, and von Ragostein plans to kill his doppelgänger and take his place in British high society, where he will be able to further his arms business and spy on Britain for the Germans. He arranges the murder with his associates.

When von Ragostein returns to London, assuming the identity of Dominey, he encounters the German aristocrat Stephanie Elderstrom, who is certain that she recognizes him as her former lover. Although von Ragostein's associates attempt to pay her to remain silent, she remains convinced that something is amiss. When von Ragostein reaches Donimey Hall, Dominey's wife is certain that it is Dominey. Gradually, doubts begin to emerge about the true identity of the man who has come home.

== Cast ==
- Edmund Lowe as Sir Everard Dominey/Baron Leopold von Ragostein
- Valerie Hobson as Eleanor Dominey
- Wera Engels as Princess Stephanie Elderstrom
- Murray Kinnell as Seaman
- Henry Mollison as Eddie Pelham
- Esther Dale as Mrs. Unthank
- Brandon Hurst as Middleton
- Ivan F. Simpson as Doctor Harrison
- Spring Byington as Duchess Caroline
- Lumsden Hare as Duke Henry
- Charles Waldron as Sir Ivan Brunn
- Leonard Mudie as Mangan
- Claude King as Sir Gerald Hume
- Frank Reicher as Doctor Trenk
- Harry Allen as Perkins
- Lowden Adams as Waiter
- Frank Benson as English Farmer
- Robert Bolder as Villager
- Willy Castello as Duval
- Edward Cooper as Butler
- David Dunbar as English Farmer
- Dwight Frye as Roger Unthank
- Nan Grey as Middleton's Daughter
- Virginia Hammond as Lady Hume
- Henry Kolker as Doctor Schmidt
- Priscilla Lawson as Maid
- Adolph Milar as German
- Thomas R. Mills as Bartender
- Pat O'Hara as Chauffeur
- John Powers as Policeman
- Tom Ricketts as Villager
- Violet Seaton as Nurse
- Leonid Snegoff as Wolff
- Larry Steers as Army Officer
- Frank Terry as Villager
- Douglas Wood as Nobleman
- Harry Worth as Hugo

== Bibliography ==
- Weaver, Tom & Brunas, Michael & Brunas, John. Universal Horrors: The Studio's Classic Films, 1931-1946. McFarland & Company, 2007.
