= The Passionate Quest =

1926 film

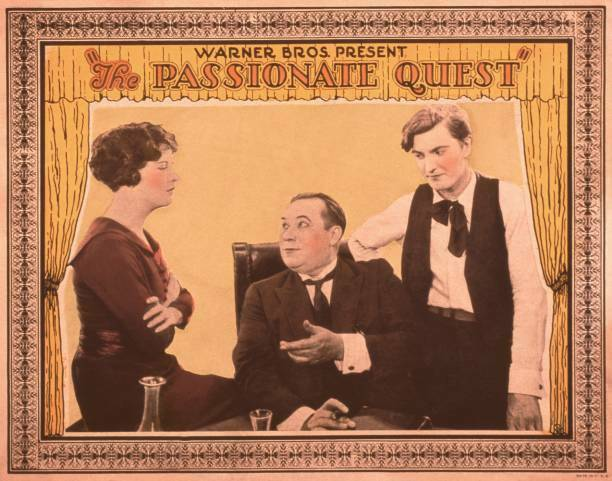
- Lobby card
- Directed by: J. Stuart Blackton
- Screenplay by: Marian Constance Blackton
- Based on: The Passionate Quest by E. Phillips Oppenheim
- Produced by: J. Stuart Blackton
- Starring: May McAvoy; Willard Louis; Louise Fazenda
- Cinematography: Nicholas Musuraca
- Production company: Warner Bros.
- Distributed by: Warner Bros.
- Release date: July 10, 1926
- Running time: 70 minutes
- Country: United States
- Language: Silent (English intertitles)

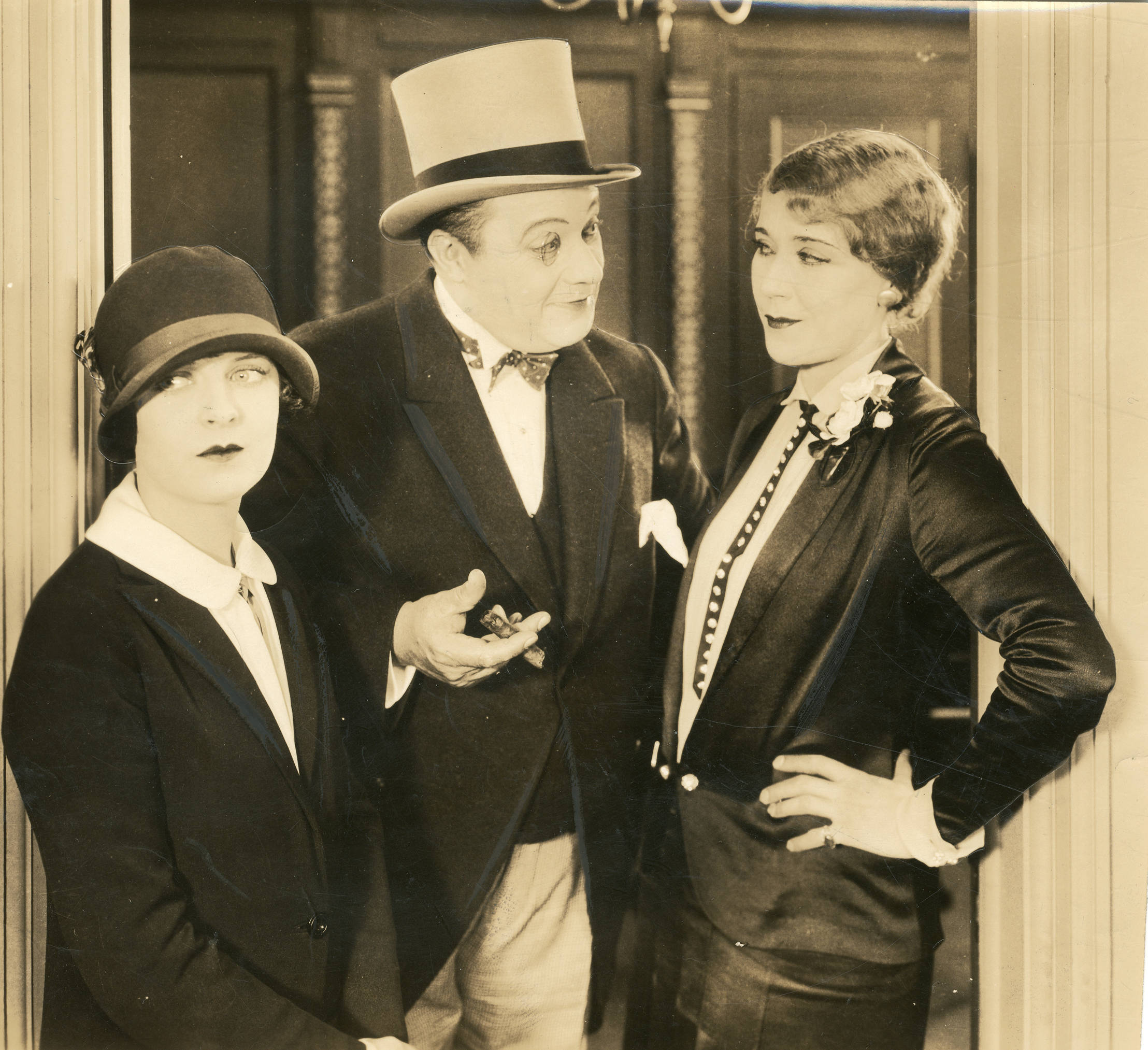
The Passionate Quest film still, 1926

The Passionate Quest is a 1926 American silent drama film directed by J. Stuart Blackton and written by Marian Constance Blackton. It is based on the 1924 novel The Passionate Quest by E. Phillips Oppenheim. The film stars May McAvoy, Willard Louis, Louise Fazenda, Gardner James, Jane Winton, and Holmes Herbert. The film was released by Warner Bros. on July 10, 1926. The film is extant at the Library of Congress and EYE Institut Filmmuseum.

== Cast ==
- May McAvoy as Rosina Vonet
- Willard Louis as Matthew Garner
- Louise Fazenda as Madame Mathilde
- Gardner James as Philip Garth
- Jane Winton as The Leading Lady
- Holmes Herbert as Erwen
- DeWitt Jennings as Benjamin Stone
- Vera Lewis as Mrs. Gardner
- Nora Cecil as Mrs. Flint
- Frank Butler as Lord 'Reggie' Towers
- Charles A. Stevenson as Rossil
- William Herford as Bone
