= Prodigals of Monte Carlo =

1926 novel

- First US edition
- Author: E. Phillips Oppenheim
- Language: English
- Genre: Romance
- Publisher: Hodder and Stoughton; Little, Brown (US)
- Publication date: 1926
- Publication place: United Kingdom
- Media type: Print

Prodigals of Monte Carlo is a 1926 romance novel by the British writer E. Phillips Oppenheim. It marked a departure from the usual style for Oppenheim who was better known for his thriller, mystery and adventure novels.

== Synopsis ==
After discovering from his doctor that he only has six months to live, Sir Hargrave Wendever decides to spend the time in Monte Carlo enjoying himself. As a gesture of he invites Betty Oliver and her impoverished artist fiancée to accompany him at his expense.

== Film adaptation ==
It was adapted into the French silent film Monte Carlo directed by Louis Mercanton and starring Carlyle Blackwell and Betty Balfour.

== Bibliography ==
- Braude, Mark. Making Monte Carlo: A History of Speculation and Spectacle. Simon and Schuster, 2017.
- Goble, Alan. The Complete Index to Literary Sources in Film. Walter de Gruyter, 1999.
- Reilly, John M. Twentieth Century Crime & Mystery Writers. Springer, 2015.
