= Jacob's Ladder (Oppenheim novel) =

1921 novel

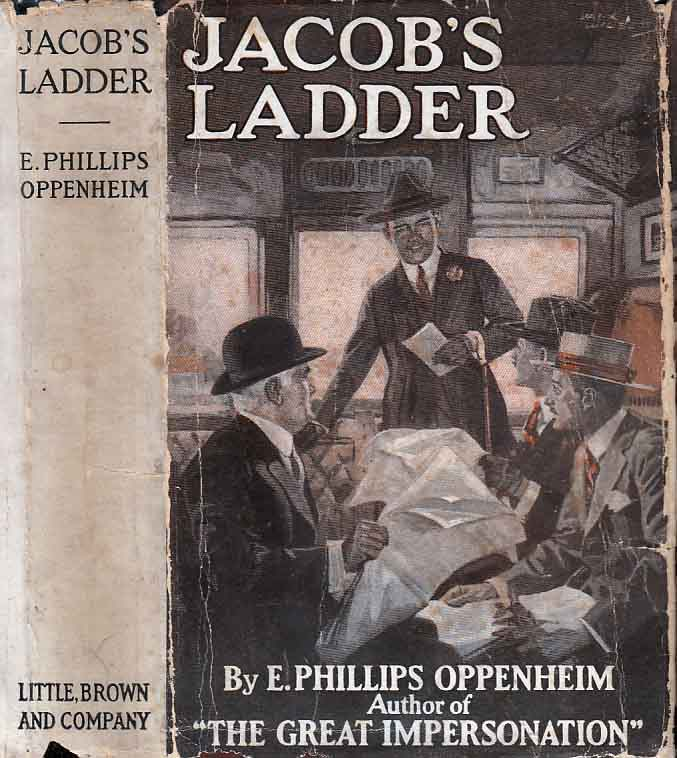
- First US edition
- Author: E. Phillips Oppenheim
- Language: English
- Genre: Thriller
- Publisher: Hodder and Stoughton (UK); Little, Brown (US)
- Publication date: 1921
- Publication place: United Kingdom
- Media type: Print

Jacob's Ladder is a 1921 thriller novel by the British writer E. Phillips Oppenheim. Oppenheim was prolific, bestselling author whose popularity reached its height during the interwar years. The novel was published in America by Little, Brown.

== Synopsis ==
A maligned and bankrupt man rises to become a millionaire, only to face various attempts to swindle him.

== Bibliography ==
- Bloom, Clive. Bestsellers: Popular Fiction since 1900. Springer, 2008.
- Reilly, John M. Twentieth Century Crime & Mystery Writers. Springer, 2015.
- Server, Lee. Encyclopedia of Pulp Fiction Writers. Infobase Publishing, 2014.
- Standish, Robert. The Prince of Storytellers: The Life of E. Phillips Oppenheim. P. Davies, 1957.
