= Sir Adam Disappeared =

1939 novel

- First edition (US)
- Author: E. Phillips Oppenheim
- Language: English
- Genre: Thriller
- Publisher: Hodder and Stoughton (UK); Little, Brown (US)
- Publication date: 1939
- Publication place: United Kingdom
- Media type: Print

Sir Adam Disappeared is a 1939 mystery thriller novel by the British writer E. Phillips Oppenheim. It was published in the United States by Little, Brown.

== Synopsis ==
While waiting for his lunch the elderly millionaire Sir Adam Blockton vanished, apparently without trace.

== Bibliography ==
- Reilly, John M. Twentieth Century Crime & Mystery Writers. Springer, 2015.
- Server, Lee. Encyclopedia of Pulp Fiction Writers. Infobase Publishing, 2014.
