= The Evil Shepherd =

1922 novel

- First US edition
- Author: E. Phillips Oppenheim
- Cover artist: Ernest Fuhr
- Language: English
- Genre: Thriller
- Publisher: Hodder and Stoughton; Little, Brown (US)
- Publication date: 1922
- Publication place: United Kingdom
- Media type: Print

The Evil Shepherd is a 1922 mystery thriller novel by the British writer E. Phillips Oppenheim. It was published in the United States by Little, Brown. Oppenheim was a prolific writer whose novels enjoyed great popularity during the era.

== Synopsis ==
Sir Francis Ledsam is a leading London barrister. He successfully defends Oliver Hilditch who is acquitted of killing his business partner. However it is revealed to Ledsam that Hilditch is in fact guilty. The same night he is murdered and Ledsam takes part in the investigation.

== Bibliography ==
- Neuburg, Victor. The Popular Press Companion to Popular Literature. Popular Press, 1983.
- Reilly, John M. Twentieth Century Crime & Mystery Writers. Springer, 2015.
- Server, Lee. Encyclopedia of Pulp Fiction Writers. Infobase Publishing, 2014.
