= Up the Ladder of Gold =

1931 novel

- First edition (UK)
- Author: E. Phillips Oppenheim
- Language: English
- Genre: Thriller
- Publisher: Hodder and Stoughton; Little, Brown (US)
- Publication date: 1931
- Publication place: United Kingdom
- Media type: Print

Up the Ladder of Gold is a 1931 thriller novel by the British writer E. Phillips Oppenheim. He dedicated the work to the comedy writer P.G. Wodehouse. It represented the apex of Oppenheim's portrayal of the great man as a dynamic force.

== Synopsis ==
An American investor Warren Brand attempts to corner the world market in gold in order to try and force the Great Powers to end any future prospect of war.

== Bibliography ==
- Herbert, Rosemary. Whodunit?: A Who's Who in Crime & Mystery Writing. Oxford University Press, 2003.
- Magill, Frank Northen . Critical Survey of Mystery and Detective Fiction: Authors, Volume 3. Salem Press, 1988.
- Panek, LeRoy. The Special Branch: The British Spy Novel, 1890-1980. Popular Press, 1981.
- Reilly, John M. Twentieth Century Crime & Mystery Writers. Springer, 2015.
