= The Strange Boarders of Palace Crescent =

1934 novel

- First edition (US)
- Author: Edward Phillips Oppenheim
- Cover artist: Arthur Hawkins, Jr. (US)
- Language: English
- Genre: Thriller
- Publisher: Hodder & Stoughton (UK); Little, Brown (US)
- Publication date: 1934
- Publication place: United Kingdom
- Media type: Print

The Strange Boarders of Palace Crescent is a thriller novel by the British writer Edward Phillips Oppenheim, which was first published in 1934. It is set in a boarding house in London.

== Synopsis ==
Struggling young businessman Roger Ferrison takes a room at a boarding house in Hammersmith. At first his fellow boarders are seemingly mundane, but he gradually notices strange happenings culminating in the murder of one of the residents just outside the house.

== Film adaptation ==
In 1938 the story provided a loose basis for the comedy-thriller film Strange Boarders made by Gainsborough Pictures and starring Tom Walls, Renée Saint-Cyr and Googie Withers. Significant alterations were made to the plot and characters.

== Bibliography ==
- Goble, Alan. The Complete Index to Literary Sources in Film. Walter de Gruyter, 1999.
