= The Lion and the Lamb (film) =

1931 film

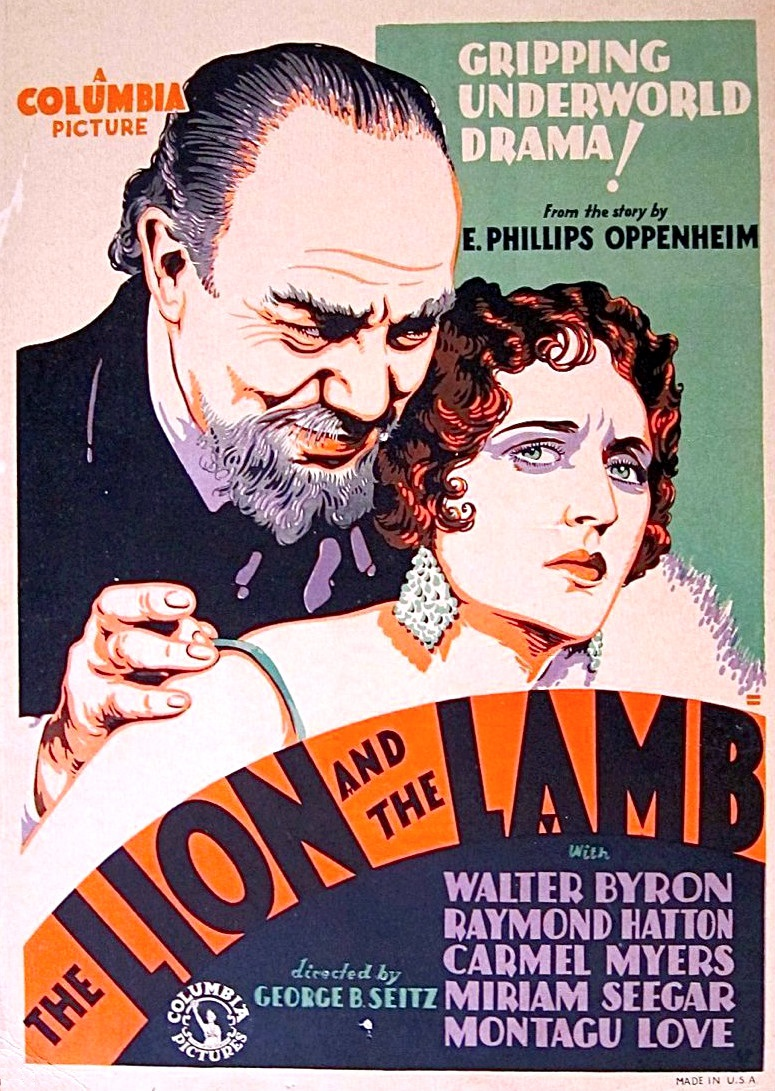
- Film poster
- Directed by: George B. Seitz
- Written by: Matt Taylor
- Based on: The Lion and the Lamb by E. Phillips Oppenheim
- Produced by: Harry Cohn
- Starring: Walter Byron; Carmel Myers; Raymond Hatton; Montagu Love
- Cinematography: Henry Sharp
- Edited by: Gene Milford
- Music by: Sam Perry
- Production company: Columbia Pictures
- Distributed by: Columbia Pictures
- Release date: January 1, 1931
- Running time: 75 minutes
- Country: United States
- Language: English

The Lion and the Lamb is a 1931 American Pre-Code comedy thriller film directed by George B. Seitz and starring Walter Byron, Carmel Myers and Raymond Hatton. It is an adaptation of the 1930 novel of the same title by E. Phillips Oppenheim.

== Plot ==
In London a young man who has recently inherited a title as an Earl encounters a notorious gang known as the Lambs and is blackmailed into joining them due to his fingerprints on a knife used to kill an alleged traitor to the gang.

== Cast ==
- Walter Byron as Dave
- Carmel Myers as Inez
- Raymond Hatton as Muggsy
- Montagu Love as Professor Tottie
- Miriam Seegar as Madge
- Charles K. Gerrard as Bert
- Will Stanton as Ruebin
- Charles Wildish as First Lascar
- Harry Semels as Second Lascar
- Robert Milasch as Lem
- Yorke Sherwood as Wister
- Sidney Bracey as Stanton

== Bibliography ==
- Goble, Alan. The Complete Index to Literary Sources in Film. Walter de Gruyter, 1999.
