= The Cinema Murder =

1919 film by George D. Baker

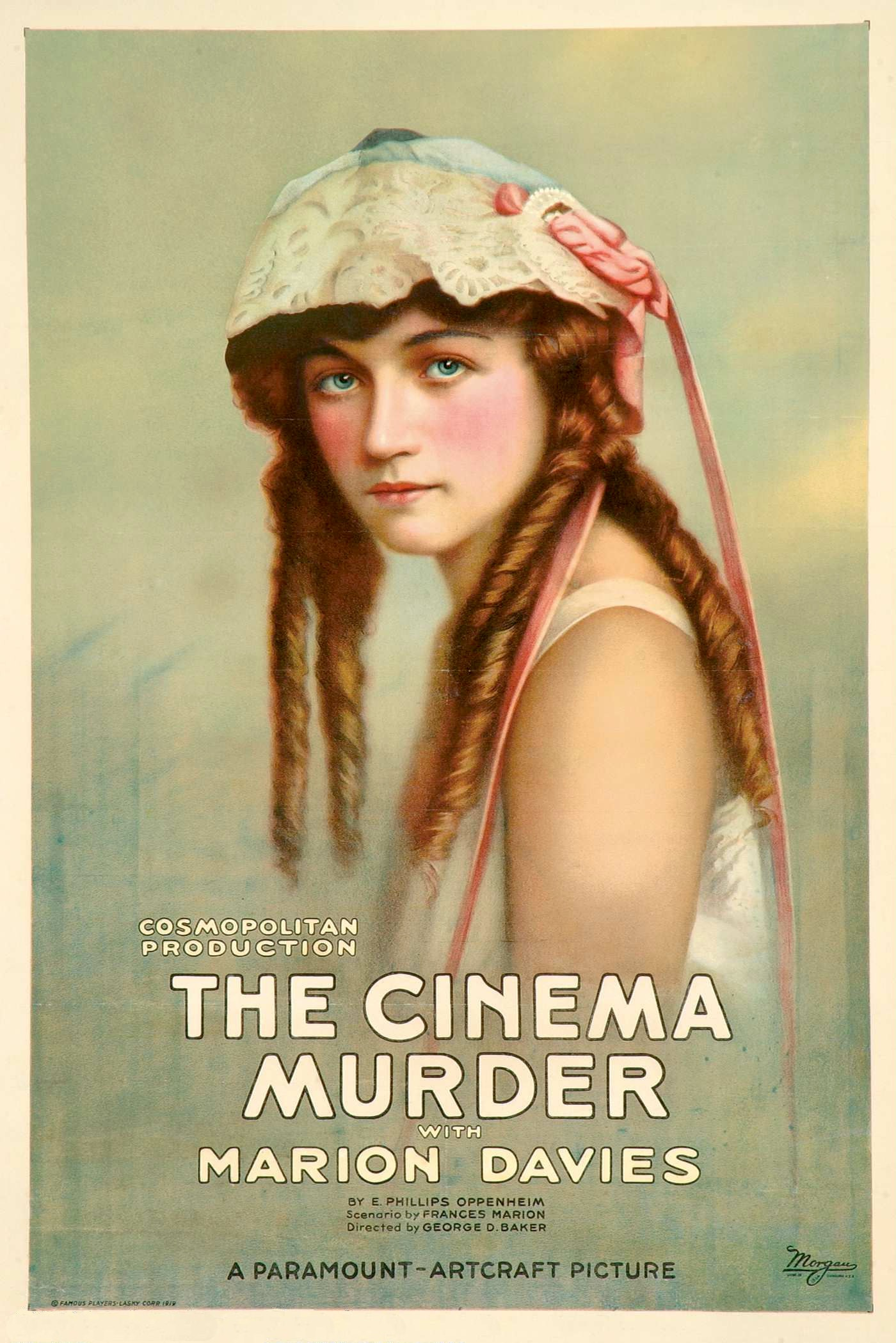
- Directed by: George D. Baker
- Screenplay by: Francis Marion
- Based on: The Cinema Murder: A Novel by E. Phillips Oppenheim
- Starring: Marion Davies; Eulalie Jensen; Anders Randolf; Reginald Barlow
- Cinematography: Harold Rosson
- Production companies: Cosmopolitan Productions; International Film Service
- Distributed by: Famous Players–Lasky Corporation; Paramount-Artcraft Pictures
- Release date: December 14, 1919
- Running time: 6 reels
- Country: United States
- Language: Silent (English intertitles)

The Cinema Murder is a 1919 American silent drama film starring Marion Davies, adapted from the 1917 novel by E. Phillips Oppenheim.

The Cinema Murder is considered to be a lost film.

== Plot ==
As described in a film magazine, Elizabeth Dalston, who is training for a future on the stage, witnesses what appears to be a murder. Horrified, she is not quite clear as to the details, but maintains a strict secrecy. On an ocean liner returning to the United States she becomes acquainted with Philip Romilly, a playwright, who prepares her for her first stage vehicle. The murderer is also a passenger on the ship, but the trip is made without serious adventure. The play opens and is a success, Elizabeth sharing in the calling. Sylvanus Power, whose money made the show possible, lays siege to Elizabeth's affections, but the new star is in love with Philip. Sylvanus then determines to ruin Philip by connecting him to the murder, only to find that the man supposedly killed is alive and well. The film ends with Philip and Elizabeth together.

== Cast ==
- Marion Davies as Elizabeth Dalston
- Peggy Parr as The Fiancée
- Eulalie Jensen as Mrs. Power
- Nigel Barrie as Philip Romilly
- W. Scott Moore as Douglas Romilly
- Anders Randolf as Sylvanus Power
- Reginald Barlow as Power's "Man Friday"
- James Holmes as Power's "Man Saturn"

== Production ==
In her 7th film, Marion Davies starred in this murder mystery, playing an actress who may or may not have witnessed a murder. The Rialto Theater in New York City claimed that this film broke its all-time attendance record with 52,000 tickets sold in one week.

== Reception ==
Critics of the time, especially those of Variety, January 14, 1920, mentioned that this particular movie, which opened at the Rialto, was so packed that at 10:00 PM the movie house owner had to turn people away after an entire day when people had been lined up around the block just to try to get in.

Critics felt that the director, George D. Baker, had done a wonderful job with the adaptation, but did mention that Marion Davies would have done better if the script had actually been written to fit her as opposed to her attempt to act the part in a starring role.

== Bibliography ==
- Title: The Cinema Murder
- Author: Edward Phillips Oppenheim
- Publisher: Little, Brown, 1917
- 309 pages
