= The Million Pound Deposit =

1930 novel

- First edition (UK)
- Author: E. Phillips Oppenheim
- Original title: First US edition
- Language: English
- Genre: Thriller
- Publisher: Hodder and Stoughton; Little, Brown (US)
- Publication date: 1930
- Publication place: United Kingdom
- Media type: Print

The Million Pound Deposit is a 1930 thriller novel by the British writer E. Phillips Oppenheim. It was published in the United States by Little, Brown.

== Synopsis ==
The formula for a revolutionary new synthetic silk is stolen from the company producing it and a ransom demand of a million pounds is sent.

== Bibliography ==
- Howarth, Patrick. Play Up and Play the Game: The Heroes of Popular Fiction. Eyre Methuen, 1973.
- Reilly, John M. Twentieth Century Crime & Mystery Writers. Springer, 2015.
- Server, Lee. Encyclopedia of Pulp Fiction Writers. Infobase Publishing, 2014.
