= The Ostrekoff Jewels =

1932 novel

- First edition (UK)
- Author: E. Phillips Oppenheim
- Language: English
- Genre: Thriller
- Publisher: Hodder and Stoughton; Little, Brown (US)
- Publication date: 1932
- Publication place: United Kingdom
- Media type: Print

The Ostrekoff Jewels is a 1932 thriller novel by the British writer E. Phillips Oppenheim. It was published in the United States by Little, Brown.

== Synopsis ==
In Petrograd during the 1917 Russian Revolution, the doomed Prince and Princess Ostrekoff approach wealthy young American diplomat Wilfred Haven. They ask him to use his diplomatic pouch and now-questionable immunity to smuggle the family's priceless jewels to their daughter, Princess Elizaveta Ostrekoff, who was last known to be in Florence. On his perilous trip, Haven must elude revolutionary Bolshevik agents who claim the jewels for the fledgling Soviet state or who might wish to steal the jewels for their own profit. Along the way, Haven encounters and rescues intrepid Anna Kastellane, whom he alternately relies upon as an ally and distrusts and suspects as a Bolshevik spy.

== Plot ==
=== Book One ===
In 1917 Petrograd, during the chaos of the Russian revolution, Prince Michael and Princess Catherine Ostrekoff appeal to their friend, young American diplomat Wilfred Haven, to smuggle their family jewels to their daughter, Elisaveta. Princess Elisaveta has been living out of Russia for some time, last known studying art in Florence. Haven is charged with tracing her and escorting her safely to London. Aware that arrest warrants have been issued for the following day, the Prince and Princess intend suicide, but wish to secure their jewels, worth £3 million, for their beloved daughter. Privately, the aristocratic couple are hopeful that the wealthy, handsome young diplomat will make a romantic match with their beautiful daughter, whom he has never met.

Haven knows he is violating international protocol by using his diplomatic pouch to smuggle jewels out of Russia. The fledgling Bolshevik government claims all aristocrats' jewels, earned by worker labor, rightfully belong to the people. Bolshevik agents will try to hunt him down to confiscate the famous Ostrekoff jewels. As the Bolsheviks are unlikely to recognize his diplomatic immunity, Haven’s own life is at risk from Russian revolutionaries. Haven accepts the charge and sets off with the jewels in a belt around his waist and a diplomatic satchel attached by a chain to his wrist.

Executions and riots are going on all over Petrograd. Haven is drawn by the loud cries of a woman being attacked by thugs who clearly intend to rape her. Haven rescues Anna Kastellane from a nearby house of ill repute. Although Haven is suspicious that the lovely Anna herself might be a spy, ultimately he gives in to her pleas and allows her to travel with him for protection, seeking a safe route out of Russia.

Haven and Anna join the US embassy staff heading by train for the frontier, but are stopped by Bolsheviks. Haven refuses to open his satchel. He is “arrested” by three “Bolsheviks” who turn out to be loyal Ostrekoff bodyguards, Alexis, Paul, and Ivan, who smuggle him into Poland.

At the former Ostrekoff hunting lodge, near the border in Poland, Haven and the three Ostrekoff bodyguards fight off renegade Bolsheviks for several days until the Bolsheviks are run off by Polish soldiers under Colonel Patinsky. Colonel Patinsky demands the Ostrekoff jewels in return for Haven’s life. Haven manages to trick and overpower Patinsky, leaving him tied up in a secret room of the lodge, unable to alert his Polish soldiers to their escape.

Haven and the three Ostrekoff men reach the relative safety of a luxury Warsaw hotel. Haven is shocked to find the resourceful and now lavishly dressed Anna Kastellane, who has brought his luggage from the train where they parted company. Europe is entangled in WWI and they discuss their options to get to London. Anna is keenly interested in the satchel always chained to Haven’s wrist. Haven is wary of her socialist sympathies, but he is attracted to her in spite of his doubts. He agrees to let her continue to accompany him to London provided she asks him no more about his mission.

At the Warsaw hotel Anna is alarmed to see General Grotzowill, who has previously pestered her for favors. Grotzowill asks Haven about news of Colonel Patinsky and the Polish soldiers who are still missing, but Haven feigns ignorance.

Haven and Anna decide to proceed on their journey by airplane to a neutral country. Anna uses General Grotzowill’s attraction to her to secure a plane to leave Poland, agreeing to the general’s quid pro quo of an evening’s rendezvous with her. Haven is disturbed at the idea of Anna using her charms to gain favors from the womanizer general and continues to have ambivalent feelings toward this mysterious woman with international contacts.

At 3:00 am, Haven and Anna are aloft on a plane to Holland, arranged by General Grotzowill as part of the quid pro quo. When Haven detects the plane is heading East instead of West, they learn that the general instructed the pilot to take them to Odessa if Anna failed to stay the night with him. Colonel Patinsky is revealed to be on the plane, eager for revenge and to relieve Haven of the jewels. Haven is able to overwhelm Patinsky and his cohorts, using their own guns against them.

In Odessa, Anna uses her acquaintance with fellow Bolshevik Serge Zakoff, the current Governor of Odessa, to get access to a plane. Once again, there is treachery and this time resolute Anna rescues the situation by stabbing Haven’s would-be strangler with a knife. Though seriously wounded, Haven manages to land the plane in Norfolk, England.

=== Book Two ===
Haven has been in an English hospital for 17 days recuperating from his injuries. He regains consciousness to find that Anna lingered just long enough to make sure he was out of danger and then absconded with the Ostrekoff jewels and his money.

Haven’s father, Norman Haven, is revealed to be one of the richest men in England, the chairman of a large bank. Wilfred Haven feels honor bound to compensate Princess Elisaveta Ostrekoff for the loss of her family fortune and is ready to pay her the £3 million value if the jewels cannot be recovered.

In London Haven enlists the help of Felix Drayton, a solicitor who acts as a “enquirer agent” (private investigator) to an elite clientele. Drayton suspects that Anna Kastellane will turn over the jewels to the Soviet government at first opportunity and they might ultimately be sold in markets in Amsterdam, London, or New York.

Discussing the situation at the Embassy Club cocktail bar, Haven and Drayton are startled to see Anna Kastellane walk in with several known Russian agents, among them Boris Roussky, formerly of the Russian Embassy, as well as a Romanoff Grand Duke.The presence of a Bolshevik in that group puzzles them. Drayton convinces Haven not to confront Anna yet until they can assess the situation. Drayton has his operatives watching her.

A few minutes later, Haven is astonished to see a beautiful young woman enter the room who bears an amazing resemblance to the late Catherine, Princess Ostrekoff, the mother of Elisaveta Ostrekoff. To Haven, the resemblance can only mean that this is Elisaveta Ostrekoff herself. Her two companions are her guardians, Colonel Oliastransky and his wife. At the direction of Drayton’s staff, the trio have come to meet Felix Drayton. Meanwhile Anna Kastellane and her group have left.

Elisaveta and her guardians admit being short of money and eager to possess the jewels. Haven writes them a check for £1000 and assures them that they will receive the jewels or their monetary value. Elisaveta sets her sights on the handsome young man who can so easily write a check for £3 million.

A week later, Anna Kastellane has an unpleasant meeting with Boris Roussky. He pressures her into continuing the espionage activities for the Communists in Russia and Poland that she now wishes to terminate. He confesses his passion for her, but she remains unmoved. Roussky then demands the Ostrekoff jewels that she took from Wilfred Haven. The jewels being in England could pose a problem for the Soviet government if Elisaveta Ostrekoff should choose to challenge ownership in court.

Anna laughs at his threats and tells him that she stole those jewels for herself and intends to keep them. She accuses him of wanting to keep the jewels to divide with his accomplices. Roussky then proposes cutting her in for a share of the jewels. He warns that a detective is watching her and that the jewels may be forfeit before long if she hesitates. Anna says she will consider the proposition.

Drayton informs Haven that Anna Kastellane has sold one of the Ostrekoff emeralds to a jeweler who is his informant. The threat of pressing charges gives them leverage over her to give up the jewels. Haven confesses his infatuation with Anna and finds it hard to believe she is just a thief.

Haven visits Anna at the address given by Drayton and expresses disappointment that she stole the jewels and his money and left him penniless at the hospital. She shrugs it off, saying he is wealthy and that he knew she was a spy. He urges her to break off with her Bolshevik comrades. Haven confesses his love for her and wants to marry her. He doesn’t care about her past and will help her get out of whatever trouble she is in. He is willing to have her turn over the Ostrekoff jewels to the Soviets and himself pay Elisaveta Ostrekoff the value of the jewels. Anna returns his love, looks favorably at the idea of marriage, and says that her past may not be as bad as he believes. Haven invites Anna to meet Elisaveta Ostrekoff, her associates, and Drayton that evening at a dinner party.

Anna receives another visit from Roussky, telling her that she needs to report to Ivan Slakoff, their superior, and the committee to defend herself against charges that she has betrayed her Bolshevik comrades. Before the committee, Anna denies the theft of the jewels but admits that she wishes to resign from the service. She has lost the Utopian idealism of the early days and become disgusted by the atrocities committed in the name of freedom by those in authority. Slakoff informs her that her name is on a list of four traitors to be executed. Slakoff hands Anna a pardon and tells her the state will not bargain for property it considers to belong to the people whose sweat and blood paid for the jewels. He excuses her “treachery” on the grounds of the service already rendered to the state. He leaves it to her conscience to give up the jewels. Anna is touched by Slakoff’s attitude and says she will likely do his bidding. After the meeting, Roussky proposes to Anna that she marry him and they keep the jewels and set up on their own in another country. Anna refuses. Roussky is subsequently killed for treachery by those he would betray.

The Ostrekoff jewels are returned anonymously to Wilfred Haven. At that evening’s dinner party, he spreads the jewels out on the table before the claimant, Elisaveta Ostrekoff, and other guests. Anna Kastellane arrives with Ivan Slakoff. Anna informs Haven that she has repented her indiscretion in taking the jewels from him. She asserts that by turning over the jewels to Elisaveta Ostrekoff, his trust is ended. As the claimant “Elisaveta” moves to take possession, Anna reveals that SHE, known as Anna Kastellane, is the real Princess Elisaveta Ostrekoff. As a college student she had allied to the socialist cause and taken the pseudonym “Anna Kastellane.” The imposter Elisaveta, actually named Vera, is her half-sister, borne in secret from an affair by the Princess Catherine Ostrekoff, their mother, while the Prince had been away at the Russo-Japanese war. The real Elisaveta had been unaware of Vera’s existence. The Oliastranskys, Vera’s guardians, admit the impersonation. They had embezzled the £100,000 settled for Vera’s support and plotted to claim the Ostrekoff inheritance, knowing the real Princess Elisaveta was missing.

Anna now declares that she wishes to be known by her real name, Elisaveta Ostrekoff. She has decided to sell the jewels to a syndicate for £3.5 million and divide £500,000 between Vera and herself. The rest will go to Ivan Slakoff, whom she believes to be an honest man, for the cause of Russian progress.

Wilfred Haven declares that, whether Anna or Elisaveta, she will have no money worries married to him. Elisaveta responds that she does indeed intend to marry him. Drayton expresses admiration for Vera, saying she can vamp him if she likes.

== Bibliography ==
- Magill, Frank Northen. Critical Survey of Mystery and Detective Fiction: Authors, Volume 1. Salem Press, 1988.
- Reilly, John M. Twentieth Century Crime & Mystery Writers. Springer, 2015.
- Server, Lee. Encyclopedia of Pulp Fiction Writers. Infobase Publishing, 2014.
