= The Ex-Duke =

1924 novel by E. Phillips Oppenheim

- Author: E. Phillips Oppenheim
- Language: English
- Genre: Drama
- Publisher: Hodder & Stoughton
- Publication date: 1924
- Publication place: United Kingdom
- Media type: Print

The Ex-Duke (US title The interloper) is a 1924 thriller novel by the British author E. Phillips Oppenheim.

== Film adaptation ==
In 1926 the novel was adapted into the American silent film Prince of Tempters directed by Lothar Mendes and starring Lois Moran, Ben Lyon, Lya De Putti.

== Bibliography ==
- Goble, Alan. The Complete Index to Literary Sources in Film. Walter de Gruyter, 199
