= The Man Without Nerves (novel) =

1934 novel

- First edition (US)
- Author: E. Phillips Oppenheim
- Language: English
- Genre: Thriller
- Publisher: Hodder and Stoughton (UK); Little, Brown (US)
- Publication date: 1934
- Publication place: United Kingdom
- Media type: Print

The Man Without Nerves is a 1934 mystery thriller novel by the British writer E. Phillips Oppenheim. It is also known by the alternative title The Bank Manager, the title under which it was first published in London. As with many of the author's work it features elements of high finance, this time alongside the more tranquil world of London's suburbs with golf courses and tennis clubs.

== Synopsis ==
In the prosperous small town of Sandywayes in Surrey a group of financiers and businessmen commute to London everyday on the train. They are rocked by the news that one of their circle has committed suicide having apparently run out of money. His bank manager's and fellow commuter's evidence confirms the verdict of suicide at the inquest. But two more financiers also die in suspicious circumstances, also having apparently lost fortunes by betting on the stock markets. Yet a persistent young man who has moved into Sandywayes, claiming to be gathering material for a novel, pesters the bank manager with questions about the mysterious deaths. Added to the mix are the local aristocrat, a foreign countess and painter and a Scotland Yard detective.

== Bibliography ==
- Michie, Ranald. War On Wealth, The: Fact And Fiction In British Finance Since 1800. World Scientific, 2023.
- Reilly, John M. Twentieth Century Crime & Mystery Writers. Springer, 2015.
- Server, Lee. Encyclopedia of Pulp Fiction Writers. Infobase Publishing, 2014.
