= Sisters of Eve =

1928 silent film

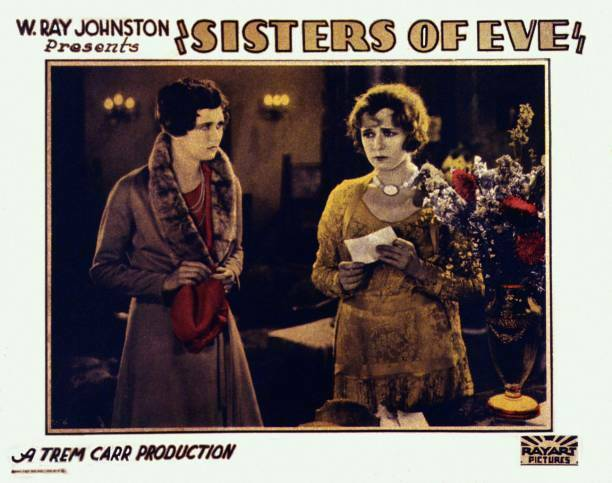
- Directed by: Scott Pembroke
- Written by: Arthur Hoerl
- Based on: The Temptation of Tavernake by E. Phillips Oppenheim
- Produced by: Trem Carr; W. Ray Johnston
- Starring: Anita Stewart; Betty Blythe; Creighton Hale
- Cinematography: Hap Depew
- Edited by: J.S. Harrington
- Production company: Trem Carr Pictures
- Distributed by: Rayart Pictures
- Release date: September 1928
- Running time: 60 minutes
- Country: United States
- Languages: Silent; English intertitles

Sisters of Eve is a 1928 American silent mystery film directed by Scott Pembroke and starring Anita Stewart, Betty Blythe and Creighton Hale. It is based on the 1911 novel The Temptation of Tavernake by E. Phillips Oppenheim.

== Cast ==
- Anita Stewart as Beatrice Franklin
- Betty Blythe as Mrs. Wenham Gardner
- Creighton Hale as Leonard Tavernake
- Harold Nelson as Prof. Franklin
- Francis Ford as Pritchard
- Charles King as Wenam Gardner/Jerry Gardner
- Mae Busch

== Bibliography ==
- Goble, Alan. The Complete Index to Literary Sources in Film. Walter de Gruyter, 1999.
