= Monte Carlo (1925 film) =

1925 film directed by Louis Mercanton

- Carlyle Blackwell, Jean-Louis Allibert and Betty Balfour
- Directed by: Louis Mercanton
- Written by: Louis Mercanton
- Based on: Prodigals of Monte Carlo by E. Phillips Oppenheim
- Produced by: A.C. Bromhead; R.C. Bromhead
- Starring: Carlyle Blackwell; Betty Balfour; Rachel Devirys
- Cinematography: Léon Wladimir Batifol
- Production company: Phocea Film
- Distributed by: Phocéa Location
- Release date: 18 December 1925
- Country: France
- Languages: Silent; French intertitles

Monte Carlo is a 1925 French silent drama film directed by Louis Mercanton and starring Carlyle Blackwell, Betty Balfour and Rachel Devirys. The film is based on the novel Prodigals of Monte Carlo by E. Phillips Oppenheim. The casting of Blackwell and Balfour in leading roles was intended to give the film appeal in the British market.

== Cast ==
- Carlyle Blackwell as Sir Hargrave Wendever
- Betty Balfour as Betty Oliver
- Rachel Devirys as Madame de Fontanes
- Jean-Louis Allibert as Robert Hewitt
- Charles Lamy as Marquis de Villiers
- Jean Aymé as Senor Trentino
- Georges Térof as Wilson
- Louis Kerly as Brandon
- Noblet as Lord Pellingham
- Henriette Clairval-Terof as Janitor
- Robert English as Sir Philip Gorse
- Lane as Gregory Marston

== Bibliography ==
- Goble, Alan. The Complete Index to Literary Sources in Film. Walter de Gruyter, 1999.
