= The Temptation of Tavernake =

1911 novel by E. Phillips Oppenheim

- 1913 edition (UK)
- Author: E. Phillips Oppenheim
- Language: English
- Genre: Thriller
- Publisher: Hodder and Stoughton (UK); Little, Brown (US)
- Publication date: 1911
- Publication place: United Kingdom
- Media type: Print

The Temptation of Tavernake is a 1911 novel by the British writer E. Phillips Oppenheim.

== Adaption ==
In 1928 it was adapted into the silent film Sisters of Eve directed by Scott Pembroke and starring Anita Stewart, Betty Blythe and Creighton Hale.

== Bibliography ==
- Goble, Alan. The Complete Index to Literary Sources in Film. Walter de Gruyter, 199
- Reilly, John M. Twentieth Century Crime & Mystery Writers. Springer, 2015.
