= Last Train Out =

1940 novel

- First edition (US)
- Author: E. Phillips Oppenheim
- Language: English
- Genre: Thriller
- Publisher: Hodder & Stoughton (UK); Little, Brown (US); McClelland & Stewart (CAN)
- Publication date: 1940
- Publication place: United Kingdom
- Media type: Print

Last Train Out is a 1940 thriller novel by the British writer E. Phillips Oppenheim. A prolific and popular writer since the Victorian era, it was one of his final works and takes place in the build-up to and early stages of the Second World War. It was notable for its sympathetic portrayal of all the Jewish characters, from an author who had in the past sometimes relied on more negative Jewish stereotypes.

== Synopsis ==
Shortly before the Anschluss British diplomat Sir Phillip Mildenhall encounters the banker and art collector Leopold Benjamin in Vienna. Benjamin manages to smuggle out his precious works before the Nazis arrive and then disappears. Mildenhall helps several Austrian Jews escape the country. Later the two men meet up again in Paris shortly before the city's fall to German force in 1940.

== Bibliography ==
- Carter, Ian. Railways and Culture in Britain: The Epitome of Modernity. Manchester University Press, 2001.
- Reilly, John M. Twentieth Century Crime & Mystery Writers. Springer, 2015.
- Turnbull, Malcolm J. Victims Or Villains: Jewish Images in Classic English Detective Fiction. Popular Press, 1998.
