= Mr. Grex of Monte Carlo =

1915 film

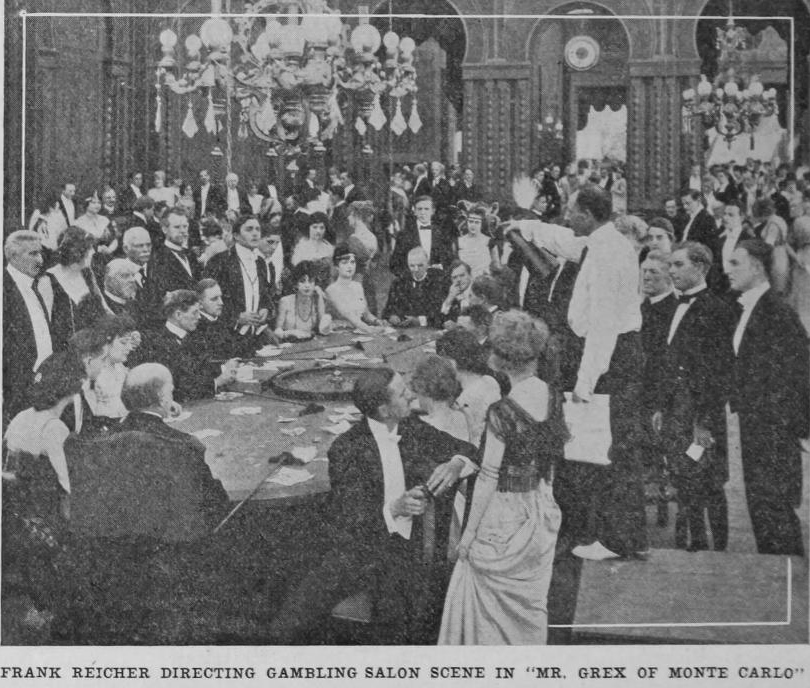
- Directed by: Frank Reicher
- Screenplay by: Marion Fairfax
- Based on: Mr. Grex of Monte Carlo by E. Phillips Oppenheim
- Produced by: Jesse L. Lasky
- Starring: Theodore Roberts; Dorothy Davenport; Carlyle Blackwell; James Neill; Horace B. Carpenter; Frank Elliott
- Cinematography: Walter Stradling
- Production company: Jesse L. Lasky Feature Play Company
- Distributed by: Paramount Pictures
- Release date: December 2, 1915
- Running time: 50 minutes
- Country: United States
- Language: Silent (English intertitles)

Mr. Grex of Monte Carlo is a surviving 1915 American silent drama film directed by Frank Reicher and written by Marion Fairfax and E. Phillips Oppenheim. The film stars Theodore Roberts, Dorothy Davenport, Carlyle Blackwell, James Neill, Horace B. Carpenter and Frank Elliott. The film was released on December 2, 1915, by Paramount Pictures. It is based on the novel of the same title by E. Phillips Oppenheim.

The film is preserved at the Library of Congress and BFI National Film and Television archive.

== Synopsis ==
Shortly before the First World War, representatives of several different countries including the American millionaire Richard Lane and British secret service agent Lord Huntersley gather in Monte Carlo at the behest of a Russian Grand Duke living incognito as Mr. Grex. He plans to negotiate a secret pact between the various Great Powers. Matters are complicated when the American falls in love with the Grand Duke's daughter Feodora.

== Cast ==
- Theodore Roberts as Mr. Grex
- Dorothy Davenport as Grand Duchess Feodora
- Carlyle Blackwell as Richard Lane
- James Neill as Herr Selingman
- Horace B. Carpenter as Mons. Pitou
- Frank Elliott as Lord Huntersley
- John McDermott as Ernest
- Robert Gray as David
- Gertrude Kellar as Lady Wibourn
- Lucien Littlefield as The Rag Picker
