= Miss Brown of X.Y.O. =

1927 novel

- First edition (UK)
- Author: E. Phillips Oppenheim
- Language: English
- Genre: Thriller
- Publisher: Hodder and Stoughton; Little, Brown (US)
- Publication date: 1927
- Publication place: United Kingdom
- Media type: Print

Miss Brown of X. Y. O. is a 1927 mystery thriller novel by the British writer E. Phillips Oppenheim. It was notable amongst thrillers of the time for its use of an everyday female character as heroine.

== Synopsis ==
Miss Brown, a respectable London-based typist, is walking through the fog-covered streets of Kensington when she is urgently called in to type down a letter for Colonel Dessiter who has just killed a foreign spy and has been shot himself in the process. The message reveals an anarchistic plot to plunge Europe into a fresh war.

== Bibliography ==
- Betz, Phyllis M. Reading the Cozy Mystery: Critical Essays on an Underappreciated Subgenre. McFarland, 2021.
- Ehland, Christoph & Wachter, Cornelia. Middlebrow and Gender, 1890-1945. BRILL, 2016.
- Reilly, John M. Twentieth Century Crime & Mystery Writers. Springer, 2015.
