= The Great Prince Shan =

1924 film

- Directed by: A.E. Coleby
- Based on: The Great Prince Shan by E. Phillips Oppenheim
- Starring: Sessue Hayakawa; Ivy Duke; Tsuru Aoki; Valia
- Production company: Stoll Pictures
- Distributed by: Stoll Pictures
- Release date: May 1924 (UK)
- Running time: 86 minutes
- Country: United Kingdom
- Languages: Silent; English intertitles

The Great Prince Shan is a 1924 British silent drama film directed by A.E. Coleby and featuring Sessue Hayakawa, Ivy Duke, Tsuru Aoki, Valia, David Hawthorne, Fred Raynham and Henry Vibart in important roles. The film is adapted from the 1922 novel of the same title by E. Phillips Oppenheim. It was made at Cricklewood Studios by Stoll Pictures, the largest British production company of the era. Location shooting took place on the French Riviera. It was one of two films former Hollywood star Hayakawa made for Stoll along with Sen Yan's Devotion released later the same year.

== Plot ==
The father of a young aristocratic woman is assassinated and she is reluctant to marry a cultured, reserved and brilliant Prince Shan, graduate of Oxford and Harvard, but becomes his mistress.

== Cast ==
- Sessue Hayakawa as Prince Shan
- Ivy Duke as Lady Maggie Trent
- Tsuru Aoki as Nita
- Valia as Nadia Karetsky
- David Hawthorne as Nigel Dorminster
- Fred Raynham as Immelmann
- Henry Vibart as Earl of Dorminster
- Henry Nicholls-Bates as Gilbert Jenson
- A.E. Coleby as Prime Minister

== Bibliography ==
- Jill Nelmes. An Introduction to Film Studies. Psychology Press, 2003.
