= Mr. Grex of Monte Carlo (novel) =

1915 novel

- Author: E. Phillips Oppenheim
- Language: English
- Genre: Spy
- Publisher: Methuen (UK); Little, Brown & Co (US)
- Publication date: 1915
- Publication place: United Kingdom
- Media type: Print

Mr. Grex of Monte Carlo is a 1915 spy novel by the British writer E. Phillips Oppenheim. The action takes place in Monaco, a favourite setting in the author's novels. Oppenheim was a pioneer of the modern spy genre, often giving his works a glamorous international setting. Although published in 1915, it was likely to have been written in 1914.

== Film adaptation ==
The same year it was made into an American silent film of the same title directed by Frank Reicher and starring Theodore Roberts, Dorothy Davenport and Carlyle Blackwell. It was produced by Paramount Pictures.

== Bibliography ==
- Britton, Wesley Alan. Beyond Bond: Spies in Fiction and Film. Greenwood Publishing Group, 2005.
- Goble, Alan. The Complete Index to Literary Sources in Film. Walter de Gruyter, 1999.
- Reilly, John M. Twentieth Century Crime & Mystery Writers. Springer, 2015.
- Standish, Robert. The Prince of Storytellers: The Life of E. Phillips Oppenheim. P. Davies, 1957.
- Woods, Brett F. Neutral Ground: A Political History of Espionage Fiction. Algora Publishing, 2008.
