= The Passionate Quest (novel) =

1924 novel by E. Phillips Oppenheim

- First US edition
- Author: E. Phillips Oppenheim
- Language: English
- Genre: Drama
- Publisher: Hodder & Stoughton (UK); Little, Brown (US)
- Publication date: 1924
- Publication place: United Kingdom
- Media type: Print

The Passionate Quest is a 1924 novel by the British writer E. Phillips Oppenheim.

== Adaption ==
In 1926 it was adapted into an American silent film of the same title directed by J. Stuart Blackton and starring May McAvoy, Willard Louis, Louise Fazenda.

== Bibliography ==
- Goble, Alan. The Complete Index to Literary Sources in Film. Walter de Gruyter, 199
