= The Inevitable Millionaires =

1923 novel

- First edition (US)
- Author: E. Phillips Oppenheim
- Language: English
- Genre: Comedy
- Publisher: Hodder and Stoughton (UK); Little, Brown (US)
- Publication date: 1923
- Publication place: United Kingdom
- Media type: Print

The Inevitable Millionaires is a 1923 comedy novel by the British writer E. Phillips Oppenheim. It was published in the United States by Boston's Little, Brown in 1925.

== Synopsis ==
Two respectable middle-aged brothers working as merchants in the City of London discover that they have a net worth of a million pounds and abandon their formerly conservative lifestyle to live it up in accordance with the instructions of their late father. Attempt after attempt to lose money goes wrong as their investments in a musical comedy, a golf club and other risky ventures turn them enormous promise. Eventually they decide to offer marriage so that they can be sued for breach of promise.

== Adaptation ==
It was adapted into the 1926 American silent film Millionaires directed by Herman C. Raymaker and starring George Sidney, Louise Fazenda and Vera Gordon. The film shifted the setting from London to New York.

== Bibliography ==
- Goble, Alan. The Complete Index to Literary Sources in Film. Walter de Gruyter, 1999.
- Reilly, John M. Twentieth Century Crime & Mystery Writers. Springer, 2015.
