= Prince of Tempters =

1926 film by Lothar Mendes

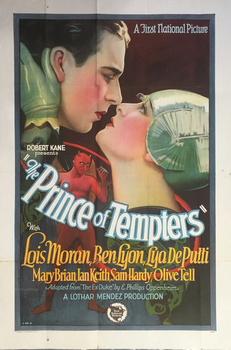
- Theatrical poster held by Federation University Historical Collection
- Directed by: Lothar Mendes
- Written by: Paul Bern
- Based on: The Ex-Duke by E. Phillips Oppenheim
- Produced by: Robert Kane
- Starring: Lois Moran; Ben Lyon; Lya De Putti; Ian Keith
- Cinematography: Ernest Haller
- Production company: Robert Kane Productions
- Distributed by: First National Pictures
- Release date: October 17, 1926
- Running time: 82 minutes
- Country: United States
- Language: Silent (English intertitles)

Prince of Tempters is a 1926 American silent romance film directed by Lothar Mendes and starring Lois Moran, Ben Lyon, and Lya De Putti. It is based on the 1924 novel The Ex-Duke by the British writer E. Phillips Oppenheim.

== Plot ==
While in Italy, the Duke of Chatsfield clandestinely marries a peasant woman, and they have a son named Francis. After the parents pass away following their separation, Francis is raised in a monastery. Upon reaching the age of 20, Francis takes his final vows. Meanwhile, his uncle, a duke, discovers that Francis is the rightful heir to the dukedom. With a dispensation granted by the Pope, Francis assumes the title. In London, Mario, a destitute novice posing as Baron Giordano, seeks to wed Monica, Francis' attractive cousin. To eliminate his competition, Mario recruits Dolores, his former lover, to entrap Francis. Despite falling prey to Dolores' tactics, Francis falls in love with Monica during a visit to his relatives, and they become engaged. However, Monica breaks off the engagement upon learning of Dolores' affections for Francis. Disheartened, Francis returns to London and engages in a series of flirtations. Upon discovering Monica's acceptance of Mario's proposal, Francis returns to the monastery. Dolores reveals Mario's deceit to Monica before taking her own life, leading to the reconciliation of the lovers.

== Cast ==
- Lois Moran as Monica
- Ben Lyon as Francis
- Lya De Putti as Dolores
- Ian Keith as Mario Ambrosio, later Baron Humberto Giordano
- Mary Brian as Mary
- Olive Tell as Duchess of Chatsfield
- Sam Hardy as Apollo Beneventa
- Henry Vibart as Duke of Chatsfield
- Judith Vosselli as Signora Wembley
- Fraser Coalter as Lawyer
- J. Barney Sherry as Papal Secretary
- Jeanne Carpenter as Flower girl

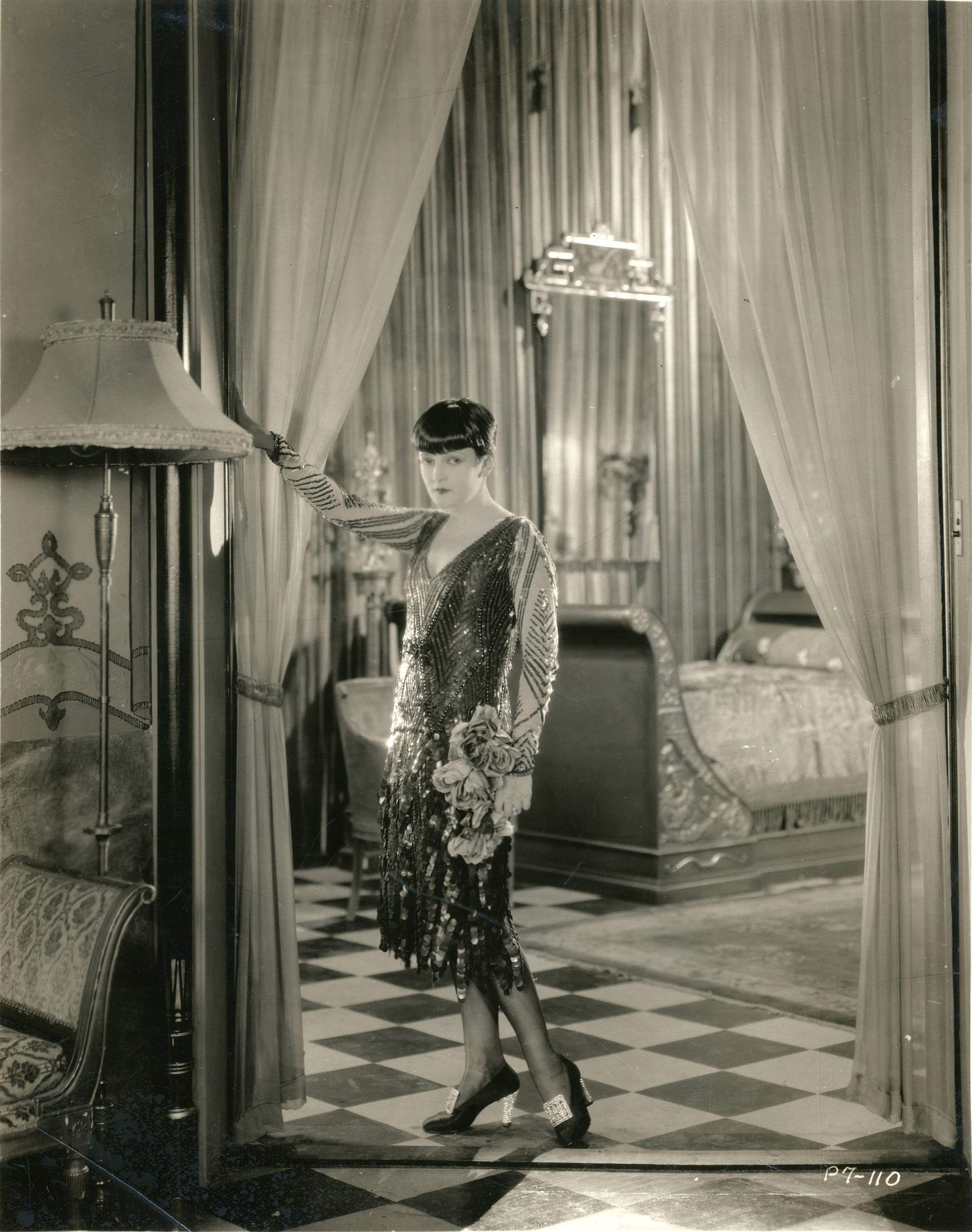
Still with Lya De Putti.

== Production ==
The film was made at the Cosmopolitan Studios in New York. It was the first film made in America by the German director Lothar Mendes, who married Dorothy Mackaill while working on the production.

== Preservation ==
A copy of this film is held at the Museum of Modern Art, New York.

== Bibliography ==
- Koszarski, Richard. Hollywood on the Hudson: Film and Television in New York from Griffith to Sarnoff. Rutgers University Press, 2008.
