= The Golden Beast =

1926 novel

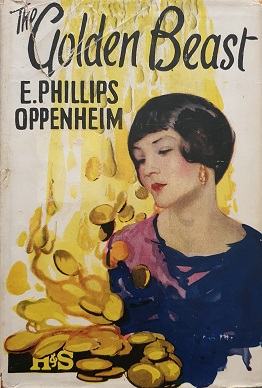
- First edition (UK)
- Author: E. Phillips Oppenheim
- Language: English
- Genre: Thriller
- Publisher: Hodder and Stoughton (UK); Little, Brown (US)
- Publication date: 1926
- Publication place: United Kingdom
- Media type: Print

The Golden Beast is a 1926 mystery thriller novel by the British writer E. Phillips Oppenheim. Oppenheim was prolific, bestselling author whose popularity reached its height during the interwar years. The novel was published in America by Little, Brown.

== Synopsis ==
After the accidental death of his son, Lord Honerton forcefully secures the execution of the gamekeeper who had struck him after objecting to his making love to his daughter. A curse seems to fall on the family, owners of a Norfolk country estate, and many years later the youngest son of the family disappears without trace - baffling the efforts of Scotland Yard to find him.

== Bibliography ==
- Reilly, John M. Twentieth Century Crime & Mystery Writers. Springer, 2015.
- Server, Lee. Encyclopedia of Pulp Fiction Writers. Infobase Publishing, 2014.
- Standish, Robert. The Prince of Storytellers: The Life of E. Phillips Oppenheim. P. Davies, 1957.
