= Strange Boarders =

1938 film

- Theatrical release poster
- Directed by: Herbert Mason
- Written by: Sidney Gilliat; A. R. Rawlinson
- Based on: The Strange Boarders of Palace Crescent by E. Phillips Oppenheim
- Produced by: Edward Black
- Starring: Tom Walls; Renée Saint-Cyr; Googie Withers; Ronald Adam
- Cinematography: Jack E. Cox
- Edited by: Michael Gordon
- Music by: Charles Williams
- Production company: Gainsborough Pictures
- Distributed by: General Film Distributors
- Release dates: May 1938 (UK); 1 August 1938 (U.S.)
- Running time: 74 minutes
- Country: United Kingdom
- Language: English

Strange Boarders is a 1938 British comedy thriller film, directed by Herbert Mason, produced by Edward Black and written by Sidney Gilliat and A. R. Rawlinson. It stars Tom Walls, Renée Saint-Cyr, Googie Withers and Ronald Adam. The film is an adaptation of the 1934 espionage novel The Strange Boarders of Palace Crescent by E. Phillips Oppenheim, and was well received by critics. It was produced by Gainsborough Pictures and distributed by General Film Distributors.

Strange Boarders was released to cinemas in the United Kingdom in May 1938.

== Plot ==
A seemingly innocuous and respectable elderly lady is knocked down and critically injured by a bus on a London street. When the police search her handbag to find out her identity, they are astonished to discover a series of top secret military blueprints. The secret service are alerted and arrive at the hospital to question her, but she laughs in their faces before quietly dying.

The man for the job is top secret service agent Tommy Blythe (Walls), who happens to be on honeymoon with new wife Louise (Saint-Cyr). He is summoned back to London under conditions of absolute secrecy, not allowed to divulge any details even to Louise, who naturally does not believe his unconvincing cover story and jumps to the conclusion that he is having an affair.

Enquiries lead to the Notting Hill boarding house where the dead woman lived and Tommy takes a room there incognito to try to infiltrate what is assumed to be a nest of spies. Louise follows him to London and confronts him, and he is forced against orders to take her into his confidence. She also takes a room and the couple pretend not to know each other, giving their names as a Mr. Bullock and a Miss Heffer. Together they set about the task of observing and investigating the sundry assortment of fellow lodgers, knowing that some are completely innocent while others harbour dark and treacherous secrets which threaten the very nation. From the grasping landlady Mrs. Dewar (Irene Handl) and the meek maid Elsie (Withers), through to fellow boarders including a blind man (Adam), a Boer War colonel and his wife apparently in retirement, a travelling salesman, a scatty old biddy and a merchant of Argentinian meat, all come under suspicion before the wily pair of sleuths manage to untangle the web of lies and false leads to reveal who in the household is or is not a traitor.

== Cast ==
- Tom Walls as Tommy Blythe
- Renée Saint-Cyr as Louise Blythe
- Googie Withers as Elsie
- Ronald Adam as Barstow
- C. V. France as Col. Lionel Anstruther
- Nina Boucicault as Mrs. Anstruther
- Martita Hunt as Miss Pitter
- C. Denier Warren as Fry
- Irene Handl as Mrs. Dewar
- Marda Vanne as Mrs. Greatorex
- Leon M. Lion as Luke
- Arthur Goullet as Señor Torres
- George Curzon as Sir Charles
- Tyrell Davis as Hayes
- Bryan Powley as George Gateshead

== Production ==
Filming took place in Pinewood Studios with sets designed by the art director Walter Murton.

== Reception ==
The Los Angeles Times described it as "a long series of laughs as well as thrills".

Halliwell's Film & Video Guide described the film as "[quite an] engaging comedy-thriller in the Hitchcock mould, with entertaining performances and incidents."

David Parkinson in Radio Times said "The spy thriller meets the bedroom farce in this sprightly British suspense comedy.

== Bibliography ==
- Leitch, Thomas and Poague, Lehand. (2011). A Companion to Alfred Hitchcock. John Wiley & Sons
- Walker, John. (ed). (1998). Halliwell's Film & Video Guide 1998. HarperCollins Entertainment. 13th edition
