= The Great Impersonation (1942 film) =

1942 film by John Rawlins

- Directed by: John Rawlins
- Written by: Scott Darling
- Based on: The Great Impersonation by E. Phillips Oppenheim
- Produced by: Paul Malvern
- Starring: Ralph Bellamy; Evelyn Ankers; Aubrey Mather; Edward Norris
- Cinematography: George Robinson
- Edited by: Russell F. Schoengarth
- Production company: Universal Pictures
- Distributed by: Universal Pictures
- Release date: December 18, 1942
- Running time: 70 minutes
- Country: United States
- Language: English

The Great Impersonation is a 1942 American thriller film directed by John Rawlins and starring Ralph Bellamy, Evelyn Ankers and Aubrey Mather. It is an adaptation of the 1920 novel The Great Impersonation by Edward Phillips Oppenheim with the setting moved from the early 1910s of the novel to the Second World War. It was made by Universal Pictures and was a remake of their 1935 film of the same name.

== Plot ==
Sir Edward Dominey and Baron Leopold von Ragenstein, who are spitting images of each other, have known one another since their days at Eton College in England. The story picks up as Dominey is found severely ill in the Dakar jungle and is brought into his old college buddy's camp, where he heals from his injuries. One night, when Dominey and Ragenstein are in the jungle camp together, England declares war on Germany, and they conclude that they are now each other's enemies. Ragenstein orders his right-hand man, Dr. Schmidt, to kill Dominey, and sets out on a long journey to London to impersonate Dominey and spy for the Third Reich.

Some time later, the German High Command sanctions Ragenstein's mission to go undercover into Britain and infiltrate the English upper ranks. His first task is to find out the defense plans for the English channel. He meets with another German agent, Frederick Seamon, who is a native Brit. Ragenstein sets out to get the plans from a relative to Dominey's wife, Sir Ronald Clayfair, who is the British Minister of Home Defense. By pure chance, Dominey's wife, Lady Muriel Ingram Dominey, spots Ragenstein, whom she believes to be her husband, at a restaurant in London. Lady Muriel introduces Ragenstein to Sir Ronald, who invites him to dinner. At the dinner, Sir Ronald offers him a position with the Home Defense. Unfortunately, Ragenstein is recognized by an old friend and mistress, Baroness Stephanie Idenbraum, whom he has to socialize with to avoid suspicion. Lady Muriel sees Ragenstein with the baroness and confronts him about it. Ragenstein makes up a story and tells Lady Muriel that the baroness just mistook him for another man. Captain Francois Bardinet of the French Consulate, who is a guest at the dinner, claims that the baroness' husband was killed in a duel a few years ago by an unidentified, mysterious lover.

Lady Muriel is still baffled by her husband's new and improved behavior. It turns out that Bardinet is a German spy who has had an affair with Lady Muriel. Seamon tells Bardinet to step back and let Ragenstein court his "wife" so that they can get their hands on the plans. Bardinet gets jealous and sabotages Ragenstein's relationship with Lady Muriel, telling her that he has seen him court the baroness on a previous occasion. The suspicious Lady Muriel talks to Sir Ronald, but he tells her to keep up appearances until they can determine if Dominey is who he says he is.

The information about Dominey's relations with the baroness reaches the British intelligence, and Ragenstein is brought in for questioning. His real identity is disclosed, and he is arrested as a spy and impostor. Ragenstein still manages to convince Sir Ronald that he is the real Dominey by telling old family stories and claiming that he has killed Ragenstein. He also claims to have infiltrated the German High Command and convinced them that the British aristocracy supports Hitler.

The German High Command decides to send a high-level emissary to Britain to visit Dominey at his summer estate in Scotland. Ragenstein delivers the plans to Seamon, to be brought back to Germany by submarine. This time around, the baroness and Bardinet are both suspicious about Ragenstein really being himself, but Seamon assures them they are being paranoid and jealous of his accomplishments. However, they are right in their suspicions.

When Dominey arrives in Berlin, he receives a warm welcome as Ragenstein. The Germans send Rudolf Hess to Dominey's estate to meet with the English aristocracy in support of Hitler. He is arrested upon arrival, and orders are given to arrest the baroness and Bardinet as well. Just before they are apprehended, they manage to send a radio message to Berlin, saying they have been double-crossed by Dominey.

Dominey manages to sneak across the border to France and avoid being arrested by Gestapo. He returns to London to be reunited with his wife.

== Cast ==
- Ralph Bellamy as Sir Edward Dominey/Baron Leopold von Ragenstein
- Evelyn Ankers as Lady Muriel Dominey
- Aubrey Mather as Sir Ronald Clayfair
- Edward Norris as Captain Francois Bardinet
- Kaaren Verne as Baroness Stephanie Idenbraum
- Henry Daniell as Frederick Seamon
- Ludwig Stössel as Doctor Schmidt
- Mary Forbes as Lady Leslie Clayfair
- Rex Evans as Sir Tristram
- Charles Coleman as Mangan
- Rudolph Anders as Karl Hofmann
- Val Stanton as English Porter (uncredited)
- Charles Irwin as Yardly
- Frederick Vogeding as Colonel Stengel
- Victor Zimmerman as Curt

== Bibliography ==
- Weaver, Tom & Brunas, Michael & Brunas, John. Universal Horrors: The Studio's Classic Films, 1931-1946. McFarland & Company, 2007.
