= The Spy Paramount =

1934 novel

- First edition
- Author: E. Phillips Oppenheim
- Cover artist: Bip Pares
- Language: English
- Genre: Spy Thriller
- Publisher: Hodder and Stoughton; Little, Brown (US)
- Publication date: 1934
- Publication place: United Kingdom
- Media type: Print

The Spy Paramount is a 1934 spy thriller novel by the British writer E. Phillips Oppenheim. It was republished in 2014 by British Library Publishing.

== Synopsis ==
An American Martin Fawley in Rome is recruited by Fascist Italy's spy chief General Berati to go undercover in a mission that takes him to Nice and Monte Carlo. Fawley, a veteran of the First World War is eager to take part in a plan that will try and secure world peace and prevent any future war.

== Bibliography ==
- Reilly, John M. Twentieth Century Crime & Mystery Writers. Springer, 2015.
- Simonetti, Paolo & Rossi, Umberto. Dream Tonight of Peacock Tails: Essays on the Fiftieth Anniversary of Thomas Pynchon’s V. Cambridge Scholars Publishing, 2015.
