= The Lion and the Lamb (novel) =

1930 novel

- First edition (UK)
- Author: E. Phillips Oppenheim
- Language: English
- Genre: Mystery Thriller
- Publisher: Hodder & Stoughton (UK); Little, Brown (US)
- Publication date: 1930
- Publication place: United Kingdom
- Media type: Print

The Lion and the Lamb is a 1930 mystery thriller novel by the British writer E. Phillips Oppenheim.

== Synopsis ==
A young man from a notable family joins a gang of criminals in London, who leave him to take the rap for one of their jobs gone wrong. When he comes out of prison he is now Lord Newberry, with money and a large estate, due to the death of his father. He sets out to have his revenge against the gang who set him up.

== Film adaptation ==
In 1931 it was made into the film The Lion and the Lamb directed by George B. Seitz and starring Walter Byron, Carmel Myers and Montagu Love. It was produced by the Hollywood studio Columbia Pictures.

== Bibliography ==
- Goble, Alan. The Complete Index to Literary Sources in Film. Walter de Gruyter, 1999.
- Reilly, John M. Twentieth Century Crime & Mystery Writers. Springer, 2015.
