= The Great Prince Shan (novel) =

1922 novel by E. Phillips Oppenheim

- First US edition
- Author: E. Phillips Oppenheim
- Language: English
- Genre: Thriller
- Publisher: Hodder & Stoughton (UK); Little, Brown (US)
- Publication date: 1922
- Publication place: United Kingdom
- Media type: Print

The Great Prince Shan is a 1922 thriller novel by E. Phillips Oppenheim.

== Adaptation ==
In 1922, the columnist 'Lucette' described, and critiqued, the book thus:

With scene laid in the year 1934, in an England whose navy and army have almost disappeared and where the Briton puts his faith in peaceful, commercial enterprises and the League of Nations, Phillips Oppenheim has built his latest story... It is, of course, well told, chatty, witty, and the tale of how catastrophe is averted is cleverly unfolded. Not, perhaps, quite as good as others from the same pen, but not a volume to be passed over, for all that.

In 1924 it was adapted by Stoll Pictures into a film The Great Prince Shan directed by A. E. Coleby and starring Sessue Hayakawa.

== Bibliography ==
- Bleiler, Everett Franklin. Science-fiction, the Early Years: A Full Description of More Than 3,000 Science-fiction Stories from Earliest Times to the Appearance of the Genre Magazines in 1930 : with Author, Title, and Motif Indexes. Kent State University Press, 1990.
- Goble, Alan. The Complete Index to Literary Sources in Film. Walter de Gruyter, 199
