= Mysterious Mr. Sabin =

1898 novel

- 1905 Little Brown edition
- Author: E. Phillips Oppenheim
- Language: English
- Genre: Thriller
- Publisher: Ward, Lock; Little, Brown (US)
- Publication date: 1898
- Publication place: United Kingdom
- Media type: Print

Mysterious Mr. Sabin is an 1898 spy thriller novel by the British writer E. Phillips Oppenheim. It was the first spy novel by Oppenheim, a genre which he came to dominate during the First World War and interwar era. Revolving around a plot of a Frenchman selling British military secrets it became a bestseller, establishing him as a popular writer. It has been described as the novel "that launched Oppenheim's career of xenophobic espionage fantasy". It contains elements of invasion fiction, a common genre theme at the time.

== Synopsis ==
A ruthless French criminal mastermind, Sabin plots to restore the French monarchy and place his niece Hélène on the throne. To accomplish this he steals various military secrets in a complex plan that involves a German invasion of Britain. He is thwarted by a young Englishman Lord Wolfenden who eventually ends up marrying Hélène.

== Bibliography ==
- Miskimmin, Esme. 100 British Crime Writers. Springer Nature, 2020.
- Panek, LeRoy. The Special Branch: The British Spy Novel, 1890-1980. Popular Press, 1981.
- Reilly, John M. Twentieth Century Crime & Mystery Writers. Springer, 2015.
- Wark, Wesley K. Spy Fiction, Spy Films and Real Intelligence. Routledge, 2013.
- Server, Lee. Encyclopedia of Pulp Fiction Writers. Infobase Publishing, 2014.
- Sutherland, John. The Longman Companion to Victorian Fiction. Routledge, 2014.
