= Millionaires (film) =

1926 film

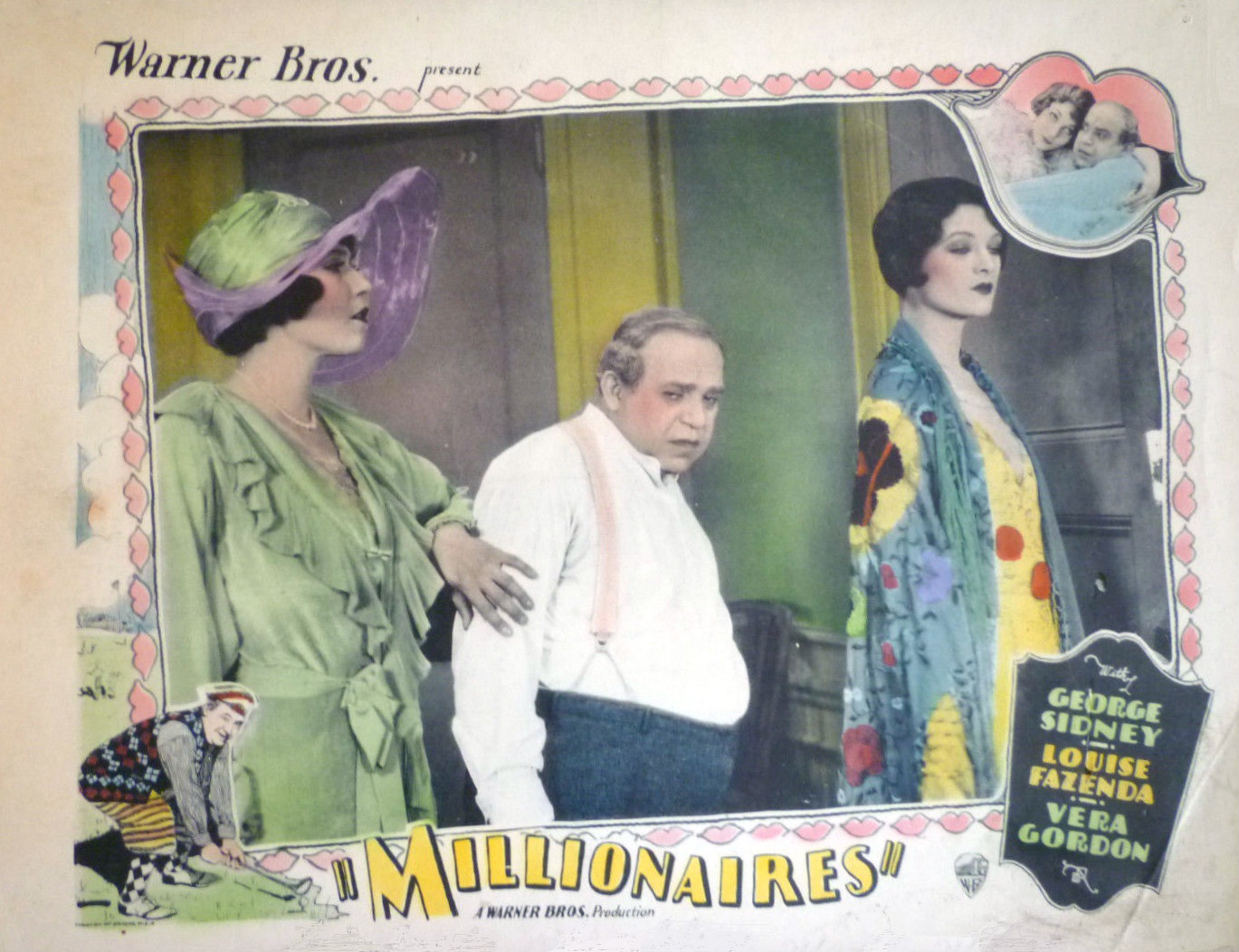
- Lobby card
- Directed by: Herman C. Raymaker
- Screenplay by: Edward Clark; C. Graham Baker; Raymond L. Schrock
- Based on: The Inevitable Millionaires by E. Phillips Oppenheim
- Starring: George Sidney; Louise Fazenda; Vera Gordon; Nat Carr; Helene Costello; Arthur Lubin
- Cinematography: Byron Haskin; Frank Kesson
- Production company: Warner Bros.
- Distributed by: Warner Bros.
- Release date: October 1, 1926
- Running time: 70 minutes
- Country: United States
- Language: English

Millionaires is a lost 1926 American comedy film directed by Herman C. Raymaker and written by Edward Clark, C. Graham Baker and Raymond L. Schrock. It is based on the 1923 novel The Inevitable Millionaires by E. Phillips Oppenheim. The film stars George Sidney, Louise Fazenda, Vera Gordon, Nat Carr, Helene Costello and Arthur Lubin. The film was released by Warner Bros. on October 1, 1926.

The film version switched the novel's setting from London to New York's East Side where a struggling Jewish tailor suddenly makes a fortune in oil stock and attempts to move up in the world socially with his newfound wealth.

== Cast ==
- George Sidney as Meyer Rubens
- Louise Fazenda as Reba, Esther's Sister
- Vera Gordon as Esther Rubens
- Nat Carr as Maurice
- Helene Costello as Ida
- Arthur Lubin as Lew
- Jane Winton as Lottie
- Otto Hoffman as Detective
- William H. Strauss as Helper in Meyer's Tailor Shop
