= The Golden Web (novel) =

1910 novel

- First Edition (US)
- Author: E. Phillips Oppenheim
- Language: English
- Genre: Mystery
- Publisher: Hodder and Stoughton (UK); Little, Brown & Co (US)
- Publication date: 1910
- Publication place: United Kingdom
- Media type: Print

The Golden Web is a 1910 mystery novel by the British writer E. Phillips Oppenheim, written using the pen name Anthony Partridge. It was first serialised in Ainslee's Magazine before being published in book form the following year in Britain and America respectively.

== Film adaptations ==
It was made into a 1920 British silent film The Golden Web directed by Geoffrey Malins and starring Milton Rosmer. A 1926 American silent remake of the same title was directed by Walter Lang and featured Lillian Rich, Huntley Gordon, Lawford Davidson.

== Bibliography ==
- Goble, Alan. The Complete Index to Literary Sources in Film. Walter de Gruyter, 1999.
- Reilly, John M. Twentieth Century Crime & Mystery Writers. Springer, 2015.
- Standish, Robert. The Prince of Storytellers: The Life of E. Phillips Oppenheim. P. Davies, 1957.
- Wlaschin, Ken. Silent Mystery and Detective Movies: A Comprehensive Filmography. McFarland, 2009.
