= The Golden Web (1920 film) =

1920 film

- Directed by: Geoffrey Malins
- Written by: Milton Rosmer
- Based on: The Golden Web by E. Phillips Oppenheim
- Starring: Milton Rosmer; Ena Beaumont
- Production company: Garrick Pictures
- Distributed by: Anchor Distributors
- Release date: September 1920
- Country: United Kingdom
- Languages: Silent; English intertitles

The Golden Web is a 1920 British silent mystery film directed by Geoffrey Malins and starring Milton Rosmer and Ena Beaumont. It is based on the 1910 novel The Golden Web by the British writer E. Phillips Oppenheim, later adapted into a 1926 American film of the same title.

== Cast ==
- Milton Rosmer as Sterling Deans
- Ena Beaumont as Winifred Rowan
- Victor Robson as Sinclair
- Nina Munro as Rosalie

== Bibliography ==
- Goble, Alan. The Complete Index to Literary Sources in Film. Walter de Gruyter, 1999.
- Low, Rachael. The History of the British Film 1918-1929. George Allen & Unwin, 1971.
- Wlaschin, Ken. Silent Mystery and Detective Movies: A Comprehensive Filmography. McFarland, 2009.
