= The Great Impersonation (1921 film) =

1921 film by George Melford

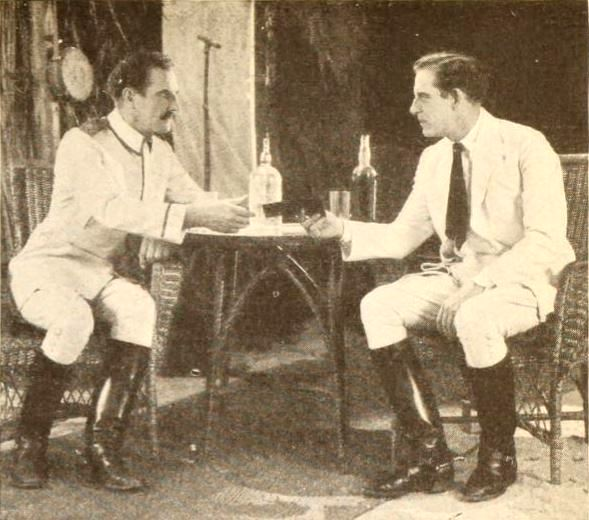
- Still with James Kirkwood, who played both a German spy and English gentleman with similar appearances
- Directed by: George Melford
- Screenplay by: Monte M. Katterjohn
- Based on: The Great Impersonation by E. Phillips Oppenheim
- Produced by: Jesse L. Lasky
- Starring: James Kirkwood, Sr. Ann Forrest; Winter Hall; Truly Shattuck; Fontaine La Rue; Alan Hale, Sr. Bertram Johns
- Cinematography: William Marshall
- Production company: Famous Players–Lasky Corporation
- Distributed by: Paramount Pictures
- Release date: October 9, 1921
- Running time: 70 minutes
- Country: United States
- Language: Silent (English intertitles)

The Great Impersonation is a 1921 American silent drama film directed by George Melford and written by Monte M. Katterjohn and E. Phillips Oppenheim. The film stars James Kirkwood, Sr., Ann Forrest, Winter Hall, Truly Shattuck, Fontaine La Rue, Alan Hale, Sr., and Bertram Johns. The film was released on October 9, 1921, by Paramount Pictures. It is not known whether the film currently survives, which suggests that it is a lost film.

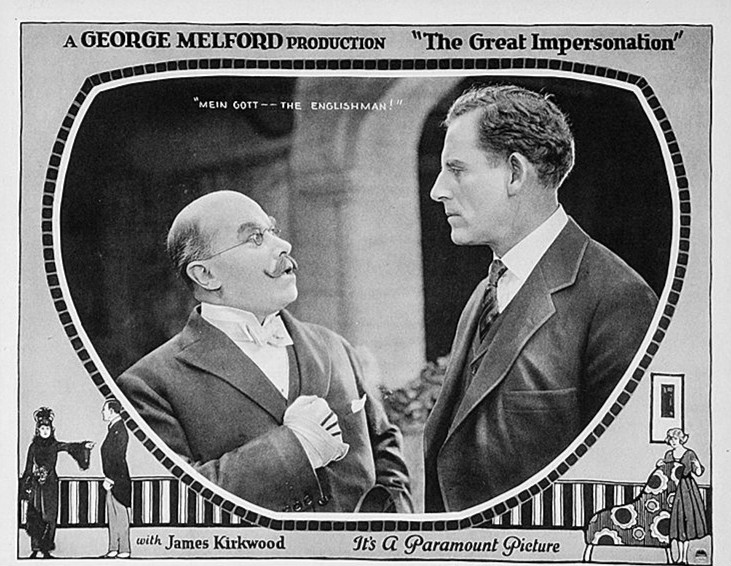
Lobby card

== Plot ==
The film is an adaptation of E. Phillips Oppenheim's 1920 novel of the same name, which follows a German spy who attempts to impersonate an English aristocrat.

== Cast ==
- James Kirkwood, Sr. as Sir Everard Dominey / Leopold von Ragastein
- Ann Forrest as Rosamond Dominey
- Winter Hall as Duke of Oxford
- Truly Shattuck as Duchess of Oxford
- Fontaine La Rue as Princess Eiderstrom
- Alan Hale, Sr. as Gustave Seimann
- Bertram Johns as Dr. Eddy Pelham
- William Burress as Dr. Hugo Schmidt
- Cecil Holland as Roger Unthank
- Tempe Pigott as Mrs. Unthank
- Lawrence Grant as Emperor William of Germany
- Louis Dumar as Prince Eiderstrom
- Frederick Vroom as Prince Terniloff
- Florence Midgley as Princess Terniloff
