= E. Phillips Oppenheim =

English novelist (1866–1946)

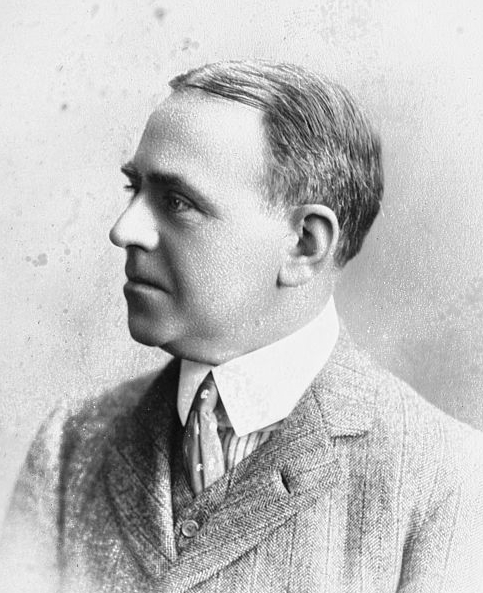
- Edward Phillips Oppenheim
- Born: Edward Phillips Oppenheim; 22 October 1866; Tottenham, London, England
- Died: 3 February 1946 (aged 79); St. Peter Port, Guernsey, Channel Islands, UK
- Occupation: Novelist
- Writing career
- Pen name: Anthony Partridge (5 novels)
- Period: 1887–1943
- Genre: Thriller romances

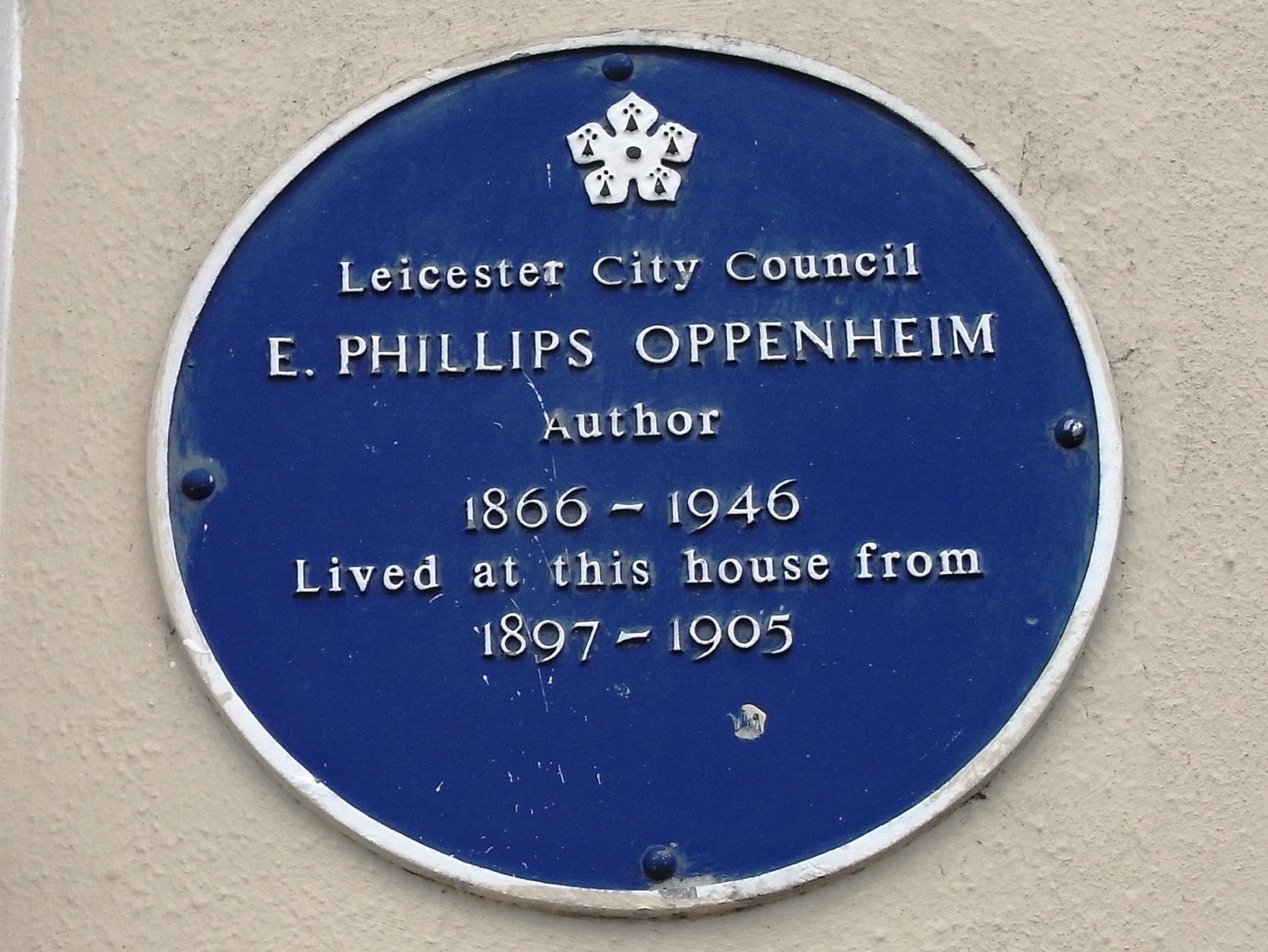
Blue plaque on Oppenheim's house in Evington, Leicester (now The Cedars pub)

Edward Phillips Oppenheim (22 October 1866 – 3 February 1946) was an English novelist, a prolific writer of best-selling genre fiction, featuring glamorous characters, international intrigue and fast action. Notably easy to read, they were viewed as popular entertainments. He was featured on the cover of Time magazine in 1927.

== Biography ==
Edward Phillips Oppenheim was born 22 October 1866 in Tottenham, London, the son of Henrietta Susannah Temperley Budd and Edward John Oppenheim, a leather merchant. (Note: The Oppenheim family immigrated to England four generations earlier. He reported overhearing a Frenchman referring to him as a "naturalized Hun" and commented: "'A naturalized Hun' with three generations of English-born ancestors behind him!" An ancestor, Ludwig von Oppenheim, was expelled from Germany in the 18th century.) After attending Wyggeston Grammar School until the sixth form in 1883, his family's finances forced him to withdraw and he worked in his father's business for almost twenty years. His father subsidized the publication of his first novel, which proved just successful enough to break even. He published five of his novels between 1908 and 1912 under the pseudonym "Anthony Partridge".

Around 1900, Julien Stevens Ulman (1865–1920), a wealthy New York leather merchant who enjoyed Oppenheim's books, bought the leather works and made him a salaried director to support his writing career. (Note: Ulman went into the leather business in 1890 and in a few years became "head of one of the largest and most successful houses engaged in that trade, having valuable connections with all foreign countries and doing an extensive exporting business".)

He quickly found a successful formula and established his reputation. In 1913, John Buchan, launching his career as a suspense novelist, called Oppenheim "my master in fiction" and "the greatest Jewish writer since Isaiah". (Note: In his memoirs, Oppenheim mentions that when first married and living in Leicester he "became a sidesman at the Parish Church". In the Anglican Church, a sidesman assists the church warden with greeting parishioners, seating arrangements, and collections.) As early as that year, his publishers were bringing out new editions of some of his earlier works to meet, in the words of one trade publication, "the insatiable demand of the public for more stories by him". It added: "Readers of the author's recent books will find these first stories of life sketches full of interest, their very crudeness being positively amusing in light of his present finished craftsmanship." (Note: The reissued works included The World's Greatest Snare (1900) and The Survivor (1901).)

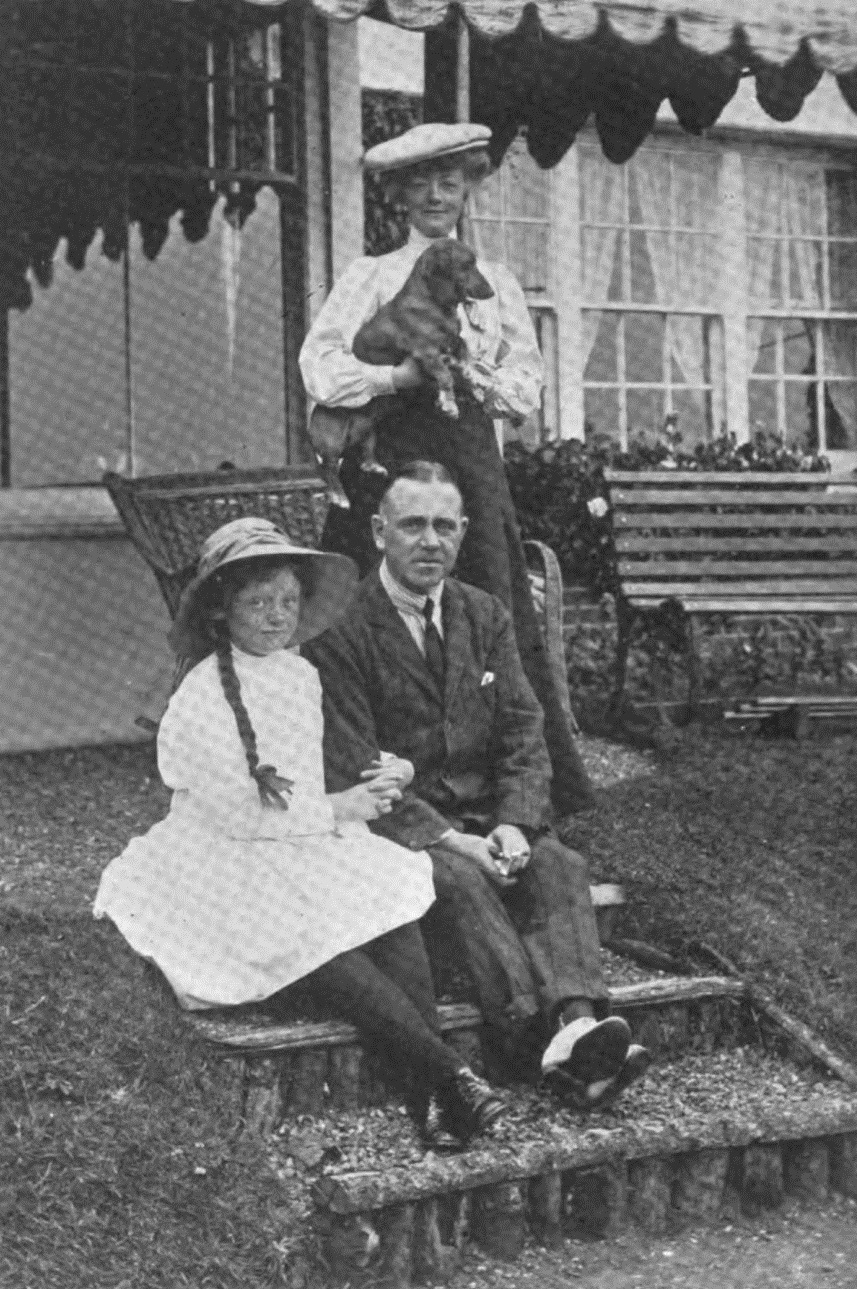
Oppenheim with his wife and daughter

In 1892 Oppenheim married an American, Elise Clara Hopkins of Easthampton, Massachusetts. They lived in Evington, Leicestershire in what is now The Cedars pub until the First World War and had one daughter. (Note: Their daughter Geraldine married John Nowell Downes, known as Nowell, and they in turn had at least one son. Geraldine survived her parents.) During that war he worked for the Ministry of Information.

He described his method in 1922: "I create one more or less interesting personality, try to think of some dramatic situation in which he or she might be placed, and use that as the opening of a nebulous chain of events." He never used an outline: "My characters would resent it." When he needed villains for his diplomatic and political intrigues he drew on Prussian militarists and anarchists, enough for one reviewer to lament "the baldness of his propaganda". For example, in A People's Man (1915), a socialist discovers that his movement is secretly run by German spies.

A 1927 review in The New York Times said he "numbers his admirers in the hundreds of thousands and has one or more of his books on a prominent shelf in almost every home one enters". He appeared on the cover of Time magazine on 12 September of that same year.

Reviews for his work treated them as entertainments with only a slight relationship to the mystery genre. In 1933, a review of Crooks in the Sunshine explained that "Mr. Oppenheim's crooks are so polished that they have no difficulty in moving in the very best society.... There is very little mystery in this book, but there is dress-suit crime galore." In 1936, a review of A Magnificent Hoax, his one hundredth novel, (Note: Miss Brown of X.Y.O. was described as his one hundredth work in 1927.) said: "The hoax is on the reader, who is led, through nearly 300 pages, only to find that nothing very terrible has happened. The explanation takes a bit of believing, but since it extricates several very nice people from what looks like a nasty mess, one is willing to let that pass." The Shy Plutocrat, published early in World War II, was "a good tale to take your mind off your worries". Readers came to expect familiar themes, "the peculiar Oppenheim blend of dispatch-box atmosphere, femmes fatales, double traitors, and a tight plot". In mid-career, The Great Impersonation (1920) was called "his best work".

Along with dozens of novel and short story collections, he produced an autobiography, The Pool of Memory, in 1942.

Oppenheim's literary success enabled him to buy a villa on the French riviera and a yacht, then a house in Guernsey, (Note: Oppenheim in his memoirs explains that they chose Guernsey because its climate was better for his health than anyplace in England.) though he lost access to this during the Second World War. He regained the house, Le Vauquiedor Manor in St. Martins, after the war and died there on 3 February 1946. His wife died there on 25 November.

An assessment that appeared in The New York Times upon his death said: "As he recalls in his pleasant and modest autobiography, all his books were easy to write. They were equally easy to read, especially on a summer vacation, when escapist literature is most welcome." He composed by dictating to a secretary and once produced seven works in a single year. His social set included the characters that populated his novels, where he created "a glamorous world of international intrigue, romance and plushy society galloping along in swift action and suspense". One academic study calls him "a talented entertainer".

== Writings ==
=== Novels ===
Oppenheim produced more than 100 novels between 1887 and 1943. They include:

- Expiation (1887)
- Curate and Fiend (1889)
- A Lawyer's Romance (1890)
- A Monk of Cruta (1894)
- The Tragedy of a Week (1894)
- The Peer and the Woman (1895)
- A Daughter of the Marionis (To Win the Love He Sought) (1895)
- False Evidence (1896)
- The Modern Prometheus (1896)
- The Mystery of Mr. Bernard Brown (The New Tenant) (1896)
- The Wooing of Fortune (1896)
- The Postmaster of Market Deignton (1897)
- The Amazing Judgment (1897)
- Mysterious Mr. Sabin (1898)
- A Daughter of Astrea (1898)
- As a Man Lives [a.k.a. The Yellow House] (1898)
- Mr. Marx's Secret (1899)
- The Man and His Kingdom (1899)
- One Little Thread of Life (1899)
- The World's Great Snare (1900)
- A Millionaire of Yesterday (1900)
- The Survivor (1901)
- Enoch Strone [a.k.a. A Master of Men] (1901)
- A Sleeping Memory [a.k.a. The Great Awakening] (1902) (*filmed 1917)
- The Traitors (1902)
- A Prince of Sinners (1903)
- The Yellow Crayon (1903)
- The Betrayal (1904)
- Anna the Adventuress (1904)
- A Maker of History (1905)
- The Master Mummer (1905)
- A Lost Leader (1906)
- The Tragedy of Adrea [a.k.a. A Monk of Cruta] (1906)
- The Malefactor [a.k.a. Mr. Wingrave, Millionaire] (1906) (*filmed 1919)
- Berenice (1907)
- The Avenger [a.k.a. The Conspirators] (1907)
- The Great Secret [a.k.a. The Secret] (1908)
- The Governors (1908)
- The Distributors [a.k.a. Ghosts of Society] (1908) (as Anthony Partridge)
- The Missioner (1908)
- The Kingdom of Earth [a.k.a. The Black Watcher] (1909) (as Anthony Partridge)
- Jeanne of the Marshes (1909)
- The Illustrious Prince (1910)
- Passers-By (1910) (as Anthony Partridge)
- The Lost Ambassador [a.k.a. The Missing Delora] (1910)
- The Golden Web (1911) (as Anthony Partridge)
- The Moving Finger [a.k.a. A Falling Star] (1911)
- Havoc (1911)
- The Temptation of Tavernake [a.k.a. The Tempting of Tavernake] (1911)
- The Court of St. Simon (1912) (as Anthony Partridge)
- The Lighted Way (1912)
- The Mischief Maker (1913)
- The Double Life of Mr. Alfred Burton (1913)
- The Way of These Women (1914)
- A People's Man (1914)
- The Vanished Messenger (1914)
- The Black Box (1915)
- The Double Traitor (1915)
- Mr. Grex of Monte Carlo (1915)
- The Kingdom of the Blind (1916)
- The Hillman (1917)
- The Cinema Murder [a.k.a. The Other Romilly] (1917) (*filmed 1920)
- The Pawns Count (1918)
- The Zeppelin's Passenger [a.k.a. Mr. Lessingham Goes Home] (1918)
- The Wicked Marquis (1919)
- The Box with Broken Seals [a.k.a. The Strange Case of Mr. Jocelyn Thew] (1919)
- The Curious Quest [a.k.a. The Amazing Quest of Mr. Ernest Bliss] (1919)
- The Great Impersonation (1920)
- The Devil's Paw (1920)
- The Profiteers (1921)
- Jacob's Ladder (1921)
- Nobody's Man (1921)
- The Evil Shepherd (1922)
- The Great Prince Shan (1922)
- The Inevitable Millionaires (1923)
- The Mystery Road (1923)
- The Wrath to Come (1924)
- The Passionate Quest (1924)
- Stolen Idols (1925)
- Gabriel Samara, Peacemaker (1925)
- The Golden Beast (1926)
- Prodigals of Monte Carlo (1926)
- Harvey Garrard's Crime (1926)
- The Interloper [a.k.a. The Ex-Duke] (1927)
- Miss Brown of X.Y.O. (1927)
- The Light Beyond (1928)
- The Fortunate Wayfarer (1928)
- Matorni's Vineyard (1928)
- The Treasure House of Martin Hews (1929)
- The Glenlitten Murder (1929)
- The Million Pound Deposit (1930)
- The Lion and the Lamb (1930)
- Up the Ladder of Gold (1931)
- Simple Peter Cradd (1931)
- The Man from Sing Sing [a.k.a. Moran Chambers Smiled] (1932)
- The Ostrekoff Jewels (1932)
- Murder at Monte Carlo (1933)
- Jeremiah and the Princess (1933)
- The Gallows of Chance (1934)
- The Man Without Nerves [a.k.a. The Bank Manager] (1934)
- The Strange Boarders of Palace Crescent (1934)
- The Spy Paramount (1934)
- The Battle of Basinghall Street (1935)
- Floating Peril [a.k.a. The Bird of Paradise] (1936)
- The Magnificent Hoax [a.k.a. Judy of Bunter's Buildings] (1936)
- The Dumb Gods Speak (1937)
- Envoy Extraordinary (1937)
- The Mayor on Horseback (1937)
- The Colossus of Arcadia (1938)
- The Spymaster (1938)
- And Still I Cheat the Gallows (1939)
- Sir Adam Disappeared (1939)
- Exit a Dictator (1939)
- The Strangers' Gate (1939)
- Last Train Out (1940)
- The Shy Plutocrat (1941)
- Mr. Mirakel (1943)

=== Short story collections ===
Most of Oppenheim's 38 collections of short stories, 27 of which have been published in the United States, are series with sustained interest in which one group of characters appears throughout. In 2004 and 2014, Stark House Press published two collections of previously uncollected Oppenheim stories, edited by Daniel Paul Morrison, perhaps the foremost collector of works by Oppenheim. Secrets and Sovereigns: The Uncollected Stories of E. Phillips Oppenheim appeared in 2004, with a biographical introduction and collector's bibliography by Morrison. And then in 2014, Ghosts and Gamblers: The Further Uncollected Stories of E. Phillips Oppeneheim was published by Stark House Press.

- The Long Arm of Mannister [a.k.a. The Long Arm] (1908)
- Peter Ruff and the Double-Four [a.k.a. The Double Four] (1912)
- For the Queen (1912)
- Those Other Days (1912)
- Mr. Laxworthy's Adventures (1913)
- The Amazing Partnership (1914)
- The Game of Liberty [a.k.a. An Amiable Charlatan] (1915)
- Mysteries of the Riviera (1916)
- Aaron Rodd, Diviner (1920)
- Ambrose Lavendale, Diplomat (1920)
- Hon. Algernon Knox, Detective (1920)
- The Seven Conundrums (1923)
- Michael's Evil Deeds (1923)
- The Terrible Hobby of Sir Joseph Londe (1924)
- The Adventures of Mr. Joseph P. Cray (1925)
- Madame [a.k.a. Madame and Her Twelve Virgins] (1925)
- The Little Gentleman from Okehampstead (1926)
- The Channay Syndicate (1927)
- Mr. Billingham, the Marquis and Madelon (1927)
- Nicholas Goade, Detective (1927)
- The Exploits of Pudgy Pete (1928)
- Chronicles of Melhampton (1928)
- The Human Chase (1929)
- Jennerton & Co. (1929)
- What Happened to Forester (1929)
- Slane's Long Shots (1930)
- Gangster's Glory [a.k.a. Inspector Dickens Retires] (1931)
- Sinners Beware (1931)
- Crooks in the Sunshine (1932)
- The Ex-Detective (1933)
- General Besserley's Puzzle Box (1935)
- Advice Limited (1936)
- Ask Miss Mott (1936)
- Curious Happenings to the Rooke Legatees (1937)
- A Pulpit in the Grill Room (1938)
- General Besserley's Second Puzzle Box (1939)
- The Milan Grill Room (1940)
- The Grassleyes Mystery (1940)

== Film adaptations ==
- The Black Box (1915)
- Mr. Grex of Monte Carlo (1915)
- The Master Mummer (1915)
- The Game of Liberty (1916), also released as Under Suspicion
- The World's Great Snare (1916)
- Master of Men (1917)
- The Hillman, filmed as In the Balance (1917); Behold This Woman (1924)
- The Court of St. Simon, filmed as The Silent Master (1917)
- The Great Awakening, filmed under its American title A Sleeping Memory (1917)
- Mr Wingrave, Millionaire (a.k.a. The Malefactor), filmed as The Test of Honor (1919)
- The Double Life of Mr. Alfred Burton (1919)
- The Illustrious Prince (1919)
- The Long Arm, filmed under its American title The Long Arm of Mannister (1919)
- The Other Romilly, filmed under its American title The Cinema Murder (1920)
- The Golden Web, filmed twice The Golden Web (1920); and again as The Golden Web (1926)
- The Mystery of Mr. Bernard Brown (1921)
- The Mystery Road (1921)
- Jeanne of the Marshes, filmed as Behind Masks (1921)
- The Great Impersonation, filmed three times: as a 1921 silent film, then again in 1935 and in 1942
- A Lost Leader (1922)
- The Missioner (1922)
- Expiation (1922)
- False Evidence (1922)
- The Great Prince Shan (1924)
- Prodigals of Monte Carlo as Monte Carlo (1925)
- The Passionate Quest (1926)
- The Ex-Duke, filmed as Prince of Tempters (1926)
- The Inevitable Millionaires, filmed as Millionaires (1926)
- The Temptation of Tavernake, filmed as Sisters of Eve (1928)
- The Lion and the Lamb (1931)
- The Strange Boarders of Palace Crescent, filmed as Strange Boarders (1936)
- The Amazing Quest of Mr Ernest Bliss (1920), also filmed as The Amazing Quest of Ernest Bliss (1936)
