= The Golden Web (1926 film) =

1926 film

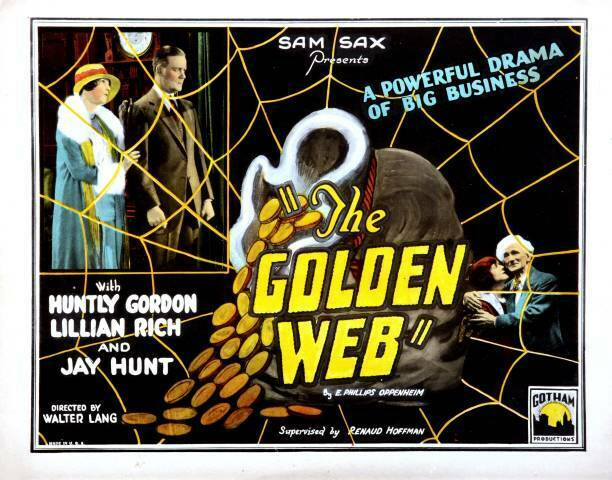
- Lobby card
- Directed by: Walter Lang
- Written by: James Bell Smith
- Based on: The Golden Web by E. Phillips Oppenheim
- Produced by: Renaud Hoffman; Samuel Sax
- Starring: Lillian Rich; Huntley Gordon; Lawford Davidson
- Cinematography: Ray June
- Production company: Gotham Pictures
- Distributed by: Lumas Film Corporation
- Release date: September 1, 1926
- Running time: 64 minutes
- Country: United States
- Language: Silent (English intertitles)

The Golden Web is a 1926 American silent mystery film directed by Walter Lang and starring Lillian Rich, Huntley Gordon and Lawford Davidson. The cast also features Boris Karloff before he established himself as a horror star. It is based on the 1910 novel The Golden Web by the British writer E. Phillips Oppenheim. A previous British film adaptation of the novel was produced in 1920.

== Plot ==
As described in a film magazine, a man loses the deed to a mine he has purchased, and is blackmailed by the finder. John Rowan, the original owner of the mine offers to secure the deed, but is arrested when the blackmailer is found dead. Rowan's daughter Ruth steals the deed from the office of the District Attorney, and the present owner of the mine marries her to atone for her father’s predicament. The husband captures the blackmailer’s crony, who confesses to the murder. The father is freed and Ruth rescued as she is about to leap from a cliff at the hour of the execution.

== Cast ==
- Lillian Rich as Ruth Rowan
- Huntley Gordon as Roland Deane
- Jay Hunt as John Rowan
- Lawford Davidson as George Sisk
- Boris Karloff as Dave Sinclair
- Nora Hayden as Miss Philbury
- Syd Crossley as Butler
- Joe Moore as Office Boy

== Preservation ==
With no prints of The Golden Web located in any film archives, it is a lost film.

== See also ==
- List of lost films
- Boris Karloff filmography

== Bibliography ==
- Connelly, Robert B. The Silents: Silent Feature Films, 1910-36, Volume 40, Issue 2. December Press, 1998.
- Langman, Larry. American Film Cycles: The Silent Era. Greenwood Publishing, 1998.
- Munden, Kenneth White. The American Film Institute Catalog of Motion Pictures Produced in the United States, Part 1. University of California Press, 1997.
- Wlaschin, Ken. Silent Mystery and Detective Movies: A Comprehensive Filmography. McFarland, 2009.
