= The Mystery of Mr. Bernard Brown (film) =

1921 film

- Directed by: Sinclair Hill
- Written by: Sinclair Hill
- Starring: Ruby Miller; Annie Esmond; Clifford Heatherley
- Cinematography: John Mackenzie
- Production company: Stoll Pictures
- Distributed by: Stoll Pictures
- Release date: November 1921
- Country: United Kingdom
- Languages: Silent; English intertitles

The Mystery of Mr. Bernard Brown is a 1921 British silent mystery film directed by Sinclair Hill and starring Ruby Miller, Annie Esmond and Clifford Heatherley. It was made by Stoll Pictures, and based on an 1896 novel The Mystery of Mr. Bernard Brown by E. Phillips Oppenheim.

== Plot summary ==
When the fiancée of a squire's daughter is killed, suspicion falls on a novelist.

== Cast ==
- Ruby Miller as Helen Thirwell
- Pardoe Woodman as Bernard Brown
- Clifford Heatherley as Sir Alan Beaumerville
- Annie Esmond as Lady Thirwell
- Ivy King as Rachel Kynaston
- Lewis Dayton as Sir Geoffrey Kynaston
- Frank Petley as Benjamin Levy
- Teddy Arundell as Guy Thirwell
- Norma Whalley as Mrs. Martival

== Bibliography ==
- Low, Rachael. History of the British Film, 1918-1929. George Allen & Unwin, 1971.
