= The Mystery of Mr. Bernard Brown (novel) =

1896 novel by E. Phillips Oppenheim

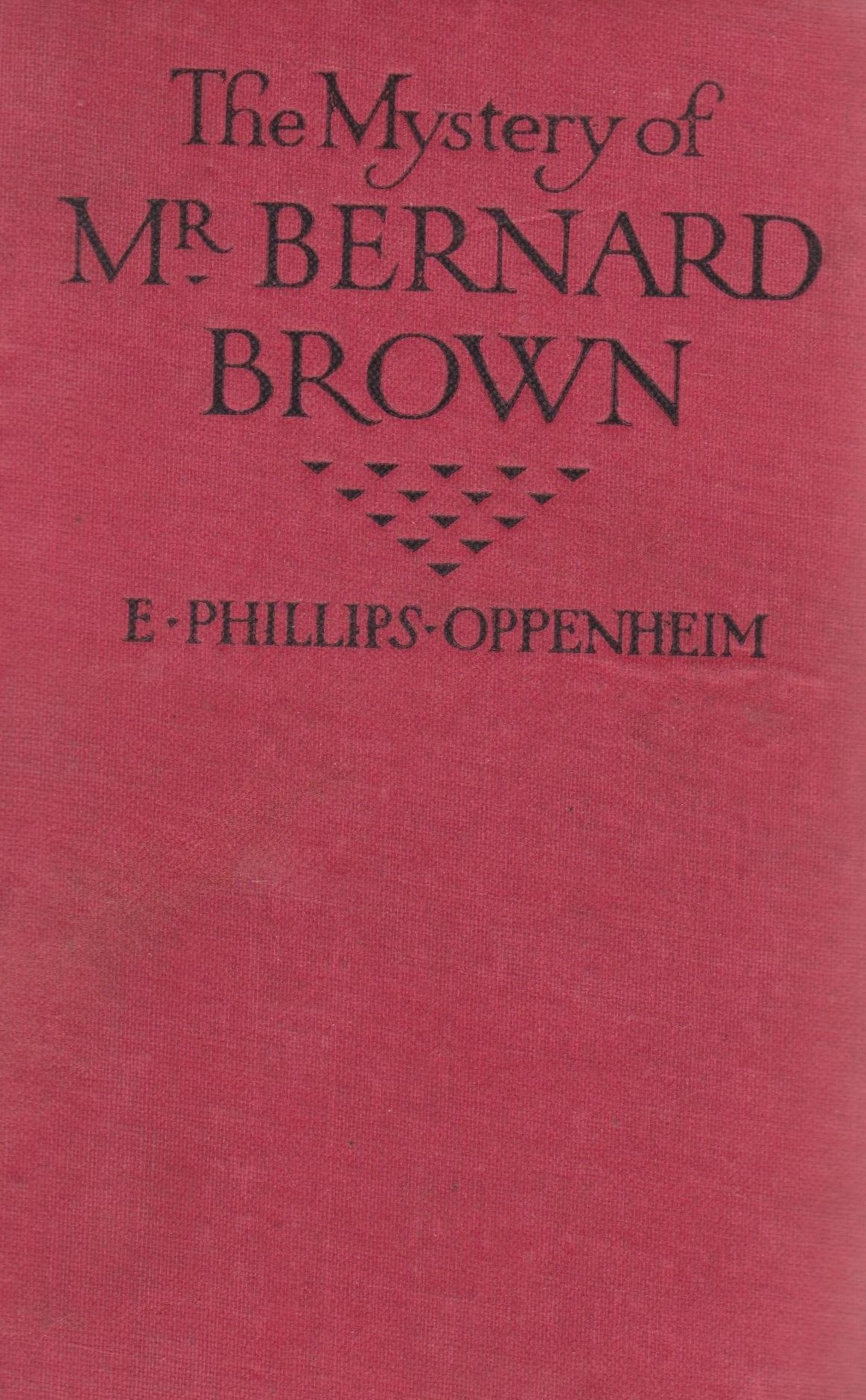
- Title page for The Mystery of Mr. Bernard Brown (1920 edition)
- Author: E. Phillips Oppenheim
- Language: English
- Genre: Drama; Crime
- Publication date: 1896
- Publication place: United Kingdom
- Media type: Print

The Mystery of Mr. Bernard Brown is an 1896 novel by the British writer E. Phillips Oppenheim. Following the apparent murder of a man, a novelist comes under suspicion.

== Film adaptation ==
In 1921 the novel was turned in a film The Mystery of Mr. Bernard Brown directed by Sinclair Hill. It was made by Stoll Pictures, the largest British studio of the era.

== Bibliography ==
- Low, Rachael. History of the British Film, 1918-1929. George Allen & Unwin, 1971.
