= The Great Impersonation (novel) =

Novel by E. Phillips Oppenheim

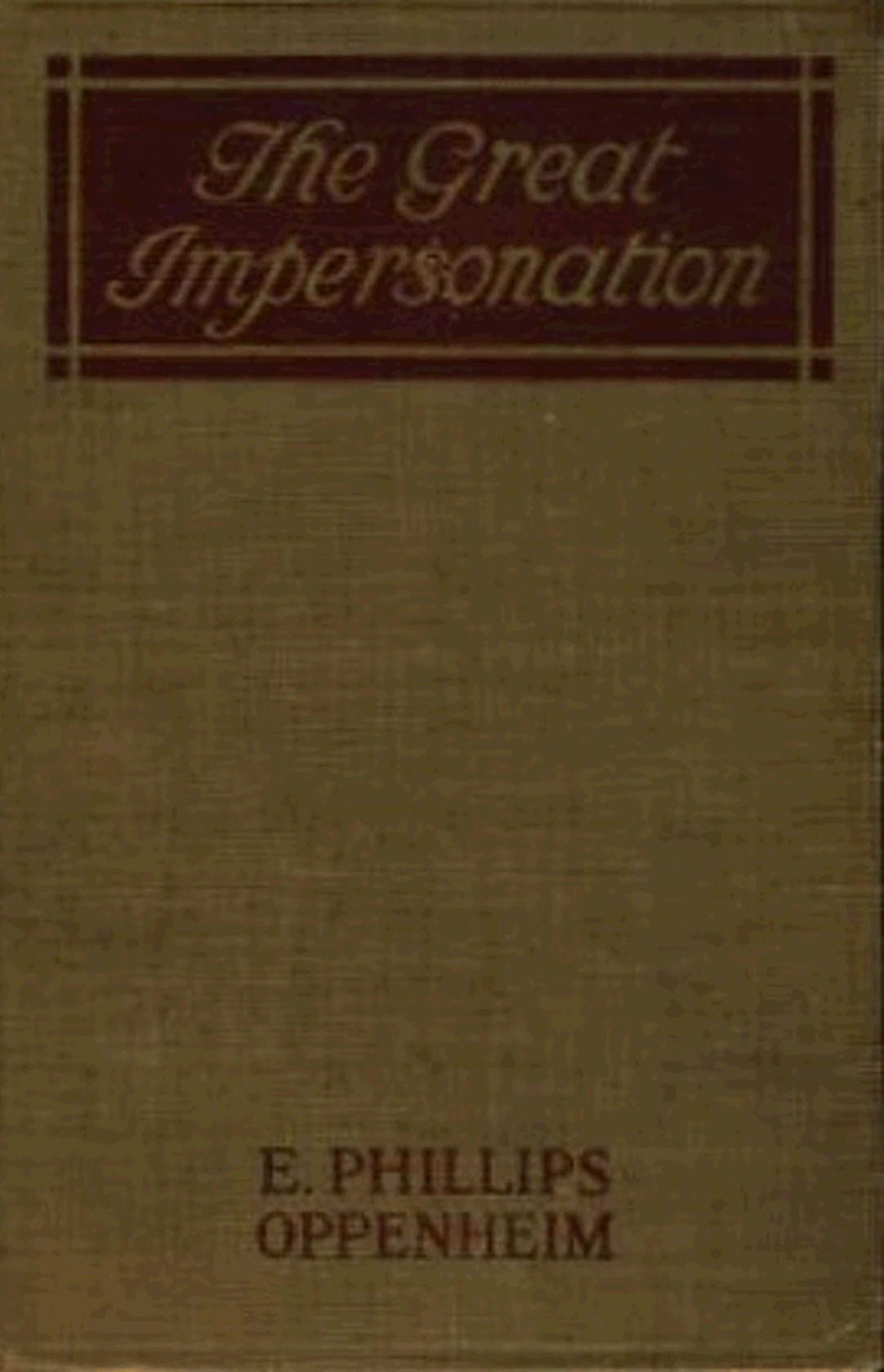
- First edition
- Author: E. Phillips Oppenheim
- Genre: Mystery, Novel
- Publisher: A.L. Burt Company with Little, Brown & Company
- Publication date: 1920
- Publication place: United Kingdom
- Media type: Print (hardback and paperback)
- Pages: 322 (1920 First Edition)
- ISBN: 978-1514855201

The Great Impersonation is a mystery novel written by E. Phillips Oppenheim and published in 1920. German Leopold von Ragastein meets his doppelganger, Englishman Everard Dominey, in Africa, and plans to murder him and steal his identity to spy on English high society just prior to World War I. However, doubts of the returned Dominey's true identity begin to arise in this tale of romance, political intrigue, and a (literally) haunting past.

== Plot summary ==
In German East Africa, Englishman Everard Dominey awakens to his doppelganger host, German Leopold von Ragastein. They spend the night drinking and sharing their dark pasts. The next day, Leopold and Dr. Schmidt devise a plan to make Everard disappear in the wilderness so that Leopold can assume his identity and fulfill his mission for the German government. The story then shifts abruptly to England. The reader follows the story of Everard without knowing if Leopold is posing as Everard or not.

In London, Everard settles into his former life. His wife, Lady Rosamund Dominey, believes that Everard killed Roger Unthank, his rival for her attentions, just before leaving for Africa; Roger has not been seen since Everard's departure. Princess Stephanie Eiderstrom believes at first sight that Everard is actually Leopold and threatens to expose him unless he agrees to a rendezvous with her. Everard speaks with Mr. Seaman and reveals that Leopold had been banished to Africa for killing a Hungarian prince, the husband of his lover Princess Eiderstrom.

Everard sends Seaman to inform the princess that they cannot meet until he has accomplished his mission disguised as Everard. Seaman, in turn, tells Everard that his mission is to monitor the German Ambassador, Prince Terniloff. Princess Eiderstrom informs Terniloff that Everard is Leopold in disguise. Prince Terniloff hopes that Leopold's mission is designed to maintain international peace and he assures the Prince that that is so.

At the Dominey estate, Mrs. Unthank accuses Everard of murdering her son, a murder Rosamund wants to avenge by killing her husband. She thinks Roger's ghost haunts the manor weekly. That night, Everard wakes to discover his wife holding a knife to his throat and she flees. She summons him to her room the next day; she has lost her desire to kill him, but cannot understand why. Everard visits her doctor, who explains that Mrs. Unthank is bad for Rosamund's health. He says that Rosamund's sanity depends on Everard's actions alone. Rosamund is sent to a mental hospital.

Mr. Seaman tells Everard that he has been summoned to meet with Kaiser Wilhelm II. Everard confronts Mrs. Unthank and makes her leave the manor. In Germany, the Kaiser reminds Everard of Germany's intention to start a war, insists that he stay close to Terniloff, and promises to rescind his exile if his mission in England succeeds.

Back in England, Princess Eiderstrom brings Everard a letter from the Kaiser, who insists that Everard marry her. He refuses because it would reveal his identity and because he loves Rosamund, who just returned from the mental hospital after ten years away. Rosamund now believes that the Everard is not her real husband.

Everard and a hunting party explore Black Wood and find that the ghost has left tracks. Prince Terniloff and Princess Eiderstrom continue to berate Everard about his role as spy. A message from Dr. Schmidt announces that the real Everard may be alive. Seaman immediately recognises the messenger as the spy Johann Wolff and wonders why a German spy would check up on them. Wolff disappears in the night.

Princess Eiderstrom tells Everard that she faces only an unfeeling simulacrum of Leopold. Mr. Seaman persuades her to maintain her silence, and she vows to leave for Africa. Seaman also believes that Wolff was abducted, and he leaves for London to investigate.

Six months later, Everard and Rosamund dine together in London, where Seaman has summoned Everard. She loves her husband but believes he loved her more than the returned Everard. Seaman tells them that English spies probably took Wolff and shows Everard a map of the Kaiser’s dream of a German European empire and tells him that their goal is to keep England out of the coming war until France falls. Seaman gives Everard the map for safekeeping.

World War I begins. The Ambassador calls Everard to apologise for being wrong in believing that Germany would not start a war. He gives Everard his memoirs of his experience in England. Everard then goes to Rosamund and tells her that he regrets to inform her that he must fight for his country.

Everard commissions a group of lumberjacks to destroy Black Wood, and Mrs. Unthank watches them. Everard accuses her of driving his wife to insanity, creating the howling ghost of Roger Unthank, and victimising an attempted murderer. She questions his identity. Everard spends the night outside his own house, waiting for the ghost of Roger Unthank. It appears, and Everard discovers that the howling, haunting ghost of Roger Unthank was a half-mad Roger Unthank. He is not dead, but has been hiding in Black Wood and terrorising the Domineys with the help of his mother.

Seaman returns from London. Princess Eiderstrom returns from Africa with Doctor Schmidt, who immediately recognises Everard as the original Everard Dominey. Everard reveals that he killed Leopold von Ragastein when he learned of his plan. He is the reason Wolff disappeared – Wolff knew the truth and was trying to inform Seaman – and he has delivered both the map and the memoirs to the English government. Seaman and Schmidt are arrested, Eiderstrom leaves in disgrace, and Everard is left with his wife, who now acknowledges him as her true husband.

== Characters ==
=== Major characters ===
- Everard Dominey – a thirty-six-year-old English baronet with a history of debt, drunkenness, and violence
- Leopold von Ragastein – full title Major-General Baron Leopold von Ragastein, currently exiled because he killed his ex-lover's husband
- Rosamund Dominey – the insane wife of Everard Dominey, renowned for her youth and beauty
- Princess Stephanie Eiderstrom – a Hungarian Princess and Leopold von Ragastein's ex-lover
- Mr. Seaman – German spy, partner of the returned Everard Dominey

=== Minor characters ===
- Roger Unthank – the missing (presumed dead) rival of Everard Dominey
- Duke Henry – prominent English politician behind the anti-German movement
- Duchess Caroline – wife of Henry, cousin of Everard, and high-society hostess
- Ambassador Terniloff – German ambassador to England; works towards peace and understanding between the two nations
- Mrs. Unthank – the mother of Roger Unthank and attendant of Rosamund Dominey
- Dr. Harrison – Rosamund Dominey's live-in doctor
- Johann Wolff – a German spy who disappears halfway through the book

== Themes ==
=== World War I ===
The majority of this novel takes place just before the start of World War I, which takes place in chapter 27. The political intrigues of the novel – the initial spy mission for von Ragastein, the fights between Mr. Seaman and Duke Henry, and the presence of Ambassador Terniloff, among others – are focused entirely on the struggle between the British and the Germans, with Great Britain as the "good" side and Germany the "bad" one.

=== The dark wilderness ===
Another main theme in the book is the metamorphosing capacities of the dark wilderness. Roger Unthank goes to Black Wood after a traumatic event, and returns years later a crazed man. Everard Dominey goes to Africa after a traumatic event, and returns years later a new, reformed man. Both Lady Dominey and Princess Eiderstrom propose, at various points during the impersonation, that their true lovers were left behind in Africa, and what returned is a false similarity.

== Reception and sales ==
The book was so popular in its time that it sold over 1 million copies in 1920 alone, and was the 8th best-selling novel of the year in the United States.

David Lehman called it "escapism on a grand scale" and "far and away the best" of Oppenheim's thriller novels. The Guardian put it on its definitive list of "1000 Novels Everyone Must Read" in 2009, under the "Crime" category.

== Other ==
The book has been adapted to film three times. The first was in 1921, starring James Kirkwood as Everard Dominey/Leopold von Ragastein and directed by George Melford. The second was in 1935, starring Edmund Lowe and directed by Alan Crosland. The last was in 1942, and has significant plot and name changes (mostly to set the story in World War II), Ralph Bellamy stars as Edward Dominey/Leopold von Ragastein, and it is directed by John Rawlins.

This book features real political figure Kaiser Wilhelm II.

The Duke of Worcester is a title that had never actually existed in English gentry. However, the Duke of Beaufort is the modern incarnation of the titles Marquess of Worcester and Earl of Worcester. All but two Dukes of Beaufort have been named Henry, the name of the Duke of Worcester in this book. While this is not a real character or title, there are references to real-life people.
