= Bentley Torcal =

Overview
- Manufacturer: Bentley
- Production: Upcoming
- Assembly: United Kingdom: Crewe (Bentley Crewe)
- Designer: Yasu Jordan Sato

Body and chassis
- Class: E-segment SUV
- Body style: 5-door crossover SUV
- Layout: Dual-motor, all-wheel-drive
- Platform: Premium Platform Electric (PPE)
- Related: Porsche Cayenne Electric

Powertrain
- Electric motor: 2× Permanent Magnet Synchronous Motors
- Power output: 821–888 PS (604–653 kW; 810–876 hp)
- Battery: 113 kWh Lithium-ion Pouch 192 Cells
- Range: 600 km (373 mi) (WLTP)

Dimensions
- Wheelbase: 3,023 mm (119.0 in)
- Length: 5,008 mm (197.2 in)
- Width: 2,025 mm (79.7 in)
- Height: 1,677 mm (66.0 in)
- Kerb weight: 2,700 kg (5,952 lb)

Rear

The Bentley Torcal is an upcoming battery electric E-segment crossover SUV produced by Bentley. It is Bentley's first fully electric vehicle (BEV) and debuted on 23 September 2026.

== History ==
The Torcal was first announced by Bentley as a fully electric "Urban SUV" in late 2025; it was to debut in mid 2026 as Bentley's first fully electric vehicle.

On 6 July 2026, Bentley officially released a teaser alongside the debut date and the Torcal nameplate, which was taken from El Torcal de Antequera, a series of rock formations in Spain.

== Overview ==
The Torcal was officially unveiled on 23 September 2026, slotting below the larger Bentayga as Bentley's second SUV. It rides on the Premium Platform Electric (PPE) and is heavily related to the Porsche Cayenne Electric.

Its exterior features several new design elements, such as rectangular headlights inspired by the Arnage, an illuminated diamond pattern "grille" inspired by the Continental T, thin diamond pattern taillights, and a generally chiseled shape taken from the EXP 15 concept. It is the first Bentley to feature the newly redesigned logo unveiled in 2025.

All models come standard with fully active hydraulic suspension and rear-axle steering.

The interior retains Bentley's typical winged dashboard design, with a variety of hand-crafted materials such as 100 percent merino wool. A curved OLED central touchscreen similar to that of the Porsche Cayenne Electric is used; meanwhile, the passenger screen available on that model is not available. The front seats are 16-way power adjustable with heating, ventilation and massaging features, while the rear seats are power adjustable. It also features power doors, a 28-speaker Naim Audio sound system and a dimmable panoramic sunroof. A synthetic sound recorded using drums is played inside and outside of the vehicle when stationary and in motion.

== Powertrain ==
The Torcal launches with two powertrain options – the Torcal and Torcal S, both of which use a dual-motor all wheel drive configuration. The base model has a total power output of 810 hp (604 kW; 821 PS) and 1,194 N⋅m (881 lb⋅ft) of torque, while the S has 876 hp (653 kW; 888 PS) and 1,350 N⋅m (996 lb⋅ft) of torque, allowing them to accelerate from 0-100 km/h (62 mph) in 3.4 and 2.9 seconds respectively. Using DC fast charging, the Torcal can charge at up to 400 kW, charging from 10%-80% in 16 minutes.
