= Dudley Noble =

Dudley Noble, who started at the Rover Company in 1911 as a motorcycle tester and competition rider, became one of the British automobile industry's pioneering publicists.

He arranged one of the first ever promotional films to be shot, in 1912, of the Rover motorcycle production and testing, ending with a sequence of him accidentally falling off his motorbike in the middle of Kenilworth ford! Many of his Rover publicity exercises, such as racing the Blue Train, passed into motoring legend.

In January 1930, the Rover name hit the world press when a Rover tried to take on Le Train Bleu on its 750-mile run between Calais and Cannes. The idea of racing the Blue Train was very popular with motor enthusiasts, and each new attempt was received with varying expectations of success. Many had already failed on this mammoth challenge. The act to promote the new Rover Light Six in a headline-grabbing campaign was the brainchild of former motorcycle tester and pioneer publicist Dudley Noble, in which a Light Six was to race the Blue Train across France from Calais to St Raphael on the Côte d'Azur. It was a moderately shameless stunt of him, being safe in the knowledge that the average speed of the famous express was no more than about 40 mph once all its stops and detours were taken into account. To beat the train, Noble had to drive more or less non-stop from Calais to the French Riviera. The Rover Light Six averaged 38 mph on its 750 miles journey to beat the train's expected time of just over 20 hours, which gave the Rover team a 20-minute lead over the train. It had been beaten for the first time and the Rover team became celebrities through the Daily Express.

In March 1930, Bentley Boy Woolf Barnato raised the stakes on Rover and its Rover Light Six having raced and beat Le Train Bleu for the first time, to better that record with his 6½ Litre Bentley Speed Six on a bet of 100 Pound Sterling. He drove against the train from Cannes to Calais, then by ferry to Dover and finally London, travelling on public highways, and won; the H. J. Mulliner-bodied formal saloon he drove during the race as well as a streamlined fastback "Sportsman Coupe" by Gurney Nutting he took delivery of on 21 May 1930 became known as the Blue Train Bentleys; the latter is regularly mistaken for or erroneously referred to as being the car that raced the Blue Train, while in fact Barnato named it in memory of his race.
