= Bentley EXP 15 =

Body and chassis
- Layout: All-wheel drive
- Platform: Porsche Cayenne Electric platform

Dimensions
- Length: Over 5,000 mm (197 in)

The Bentley EXP 15 is an electric three-door SUV set to be produced by Bentley.
