= Blue Train Races =

Series of races between cars and trains in the early Twentieth Century

The Blue Train Races were a series of record-breaking attempts between automobiles and trains in the late 1920s and early 1930s. It saw a number of motorists and their own or sponsored automobiles race against the Le Train Bleu, a train that ran between Calais and the French Riviera. The rationale to beat the train was to compare the contemporary automotive performance with locomotive dominance; to showcase recent progress achieved by cars regarding reliability, durability, speed and comfort; to promote the cars, their marques and the adventurous persona of their drivers; and to establish automobiles as a viable and aspirational mode of transport for the individual traveller.

== The Blue Train ==
Le Train Bleu (lit. "the blue train"), officially the Calais-Méditerranée Express, was a luxury French night express train which carried wealthy and famous passengers between Calais and the French Riviera from 1922 until 1938. It was colloquially referred to as "le train bleu" in French and the Blue Train in English because of its dark blue sleeping cars, and became formally known as Le Train Bleu after World War II.

It was created by a private French railroad company, the Chemins de fer de Paris à Lyon et à la Méditerranée, or PLM, to take British aristocrats, celebrities and the wealthy to the French Riviera. It made its first journey on December 8, 1922.

The prime season for "le train bleu" was between November and April, when wealthy travellers escaped the British winter to spend their holiday on the French Riviera. It originated at the Gare Maritime in Calais, where it picked up British passengers from the ferries across the English Channel. It departed at 1:00 in the afternoon and went to the Gare du Nord in Paris, then around Paris by the Grande Ceinture line to the Gare de Lyon, where it picked up additional passengers and coaches. It departed Paris early in the evening, and made stops at Dijon, Chalon, and Lyon, before reaching Marseille early in the morning. It then made stops at all the major resort towns of the French Riviera, or Côte d'Azur: St. Raphael, Juan-les-Pins, Antibes, Cannes, Nice, Monaco, and its final destination, Menton, near the Italian border.

== Rover Light Six ==
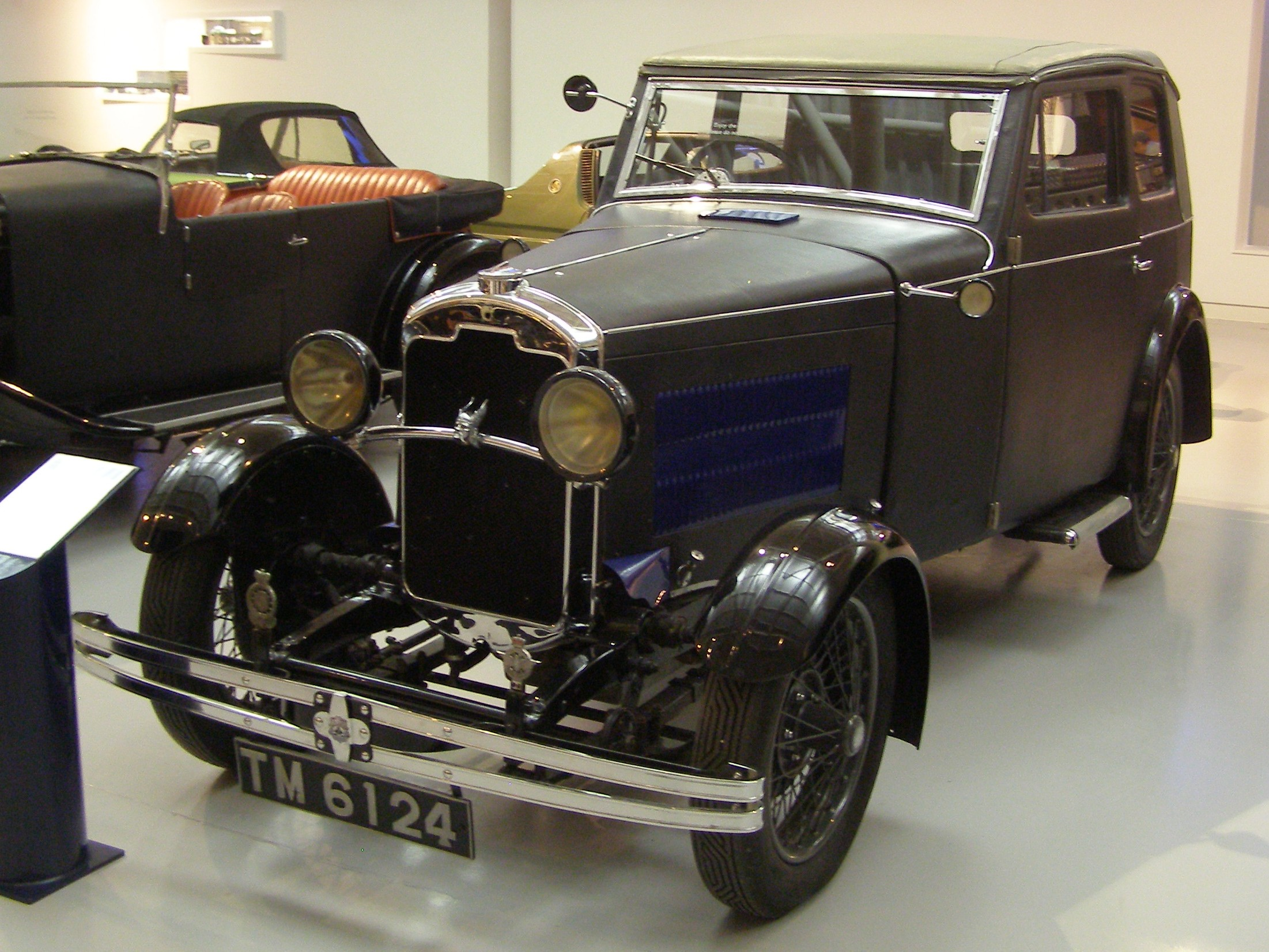
1929 Rover Light Six "Blue Train"

In January 1930, the Rover name was publicised by a race between a Rover and "Le train bleu" on the train's 750-mile (1,210 km) run between Calais and Cannes. The idea of racing the Blue Train was popular with motor enthusiasts, and each new attempt was received with varying expectations of success. Many had already failed this challenge. Former motorcycle tester and pioneer publicist Dudley Noble had the idea to promote the new Rover Light Six by racing it against the Blue Train across France from St. Raphael on the Côte d'Azur to Calais. Noble knew that the average speed of the Blue Train, once all its stops and detours were taken into account, was no more than about 40 mph (64 km/h). To beat the train, Noble had to drive more or less non-stop from St. Raphael to Calais. The Rover Light Six averaged 38 mph (61 km/h) on its 750 miles (1,210 km) journey to beat the train's expected time of just over 20 hours, which gave the Rover team a 20-minute lead over the train. The Blue Train had been beaten for the first time and the Rover team became celebrities through the Daily Express.

== Alvis Silver Eagle ==
In early March 1930, E.J.P. Eugster raced an Alvis Silver Eagle against the Blue Train and beat it to Calais by three hours. Eugster and his co-driver faced rain before Lyon, a problem getting petrol at 00:40h in Lyon, level crossings between Lyon and Versailles, "bad roads" being used as a detour around Paris, and a twenty-minute stop at another level crossing before reaching Calais at 12:15h.

== Bentley Speed Six ==
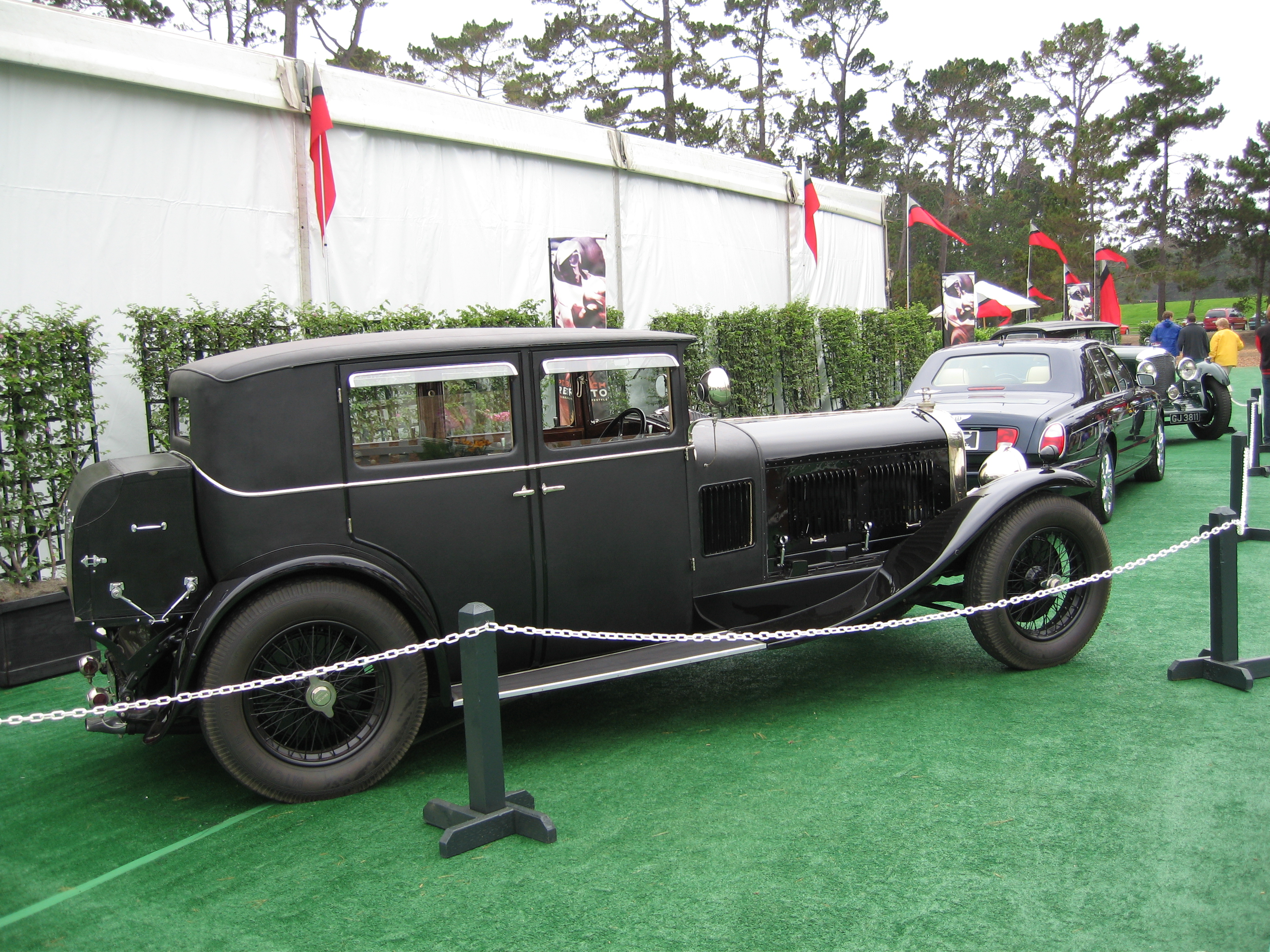
Woolf Barnato's Speed Six H. J. Mulliner saloon, in which he raced against the Blue Train.

In March 1930, at a dinner at the Carlton Hotel in Cannes, talk around the table had swung round to the topic of motor cars; in particular to the advertisement by Rover claiming that its Light Six had gone faster than the famous "Le train bleu" express. Woolf Barnato, chairman of Bentley and winner of the 24 Hours of Le Mans in 1928 and 1929, (Note: Barnato would win at Le Mans again the following June.) contended that just to go faster than the Blue Train was of no special merit. He raised the stakes by arguing that at the wheel of his Bentley Speed Six, he could be at his club in London before the train reached Calais and bet £100 on that challenge.

The next day, 13 March 1930, as the Blue Train steamed out of Cannes station at 17:45, Barnato and his relief driver, amateur golfer Dale Bourn, finished their drinks and drove the Bentley away from the bar at the Carlton. From Lyon onwards they had to battle against heavy rain. At 04:20, in Auxerre, they lost time searching for a refueling rendezvous. Through central France they hit fog, then shortly after Paris they had a burst tyre, requiring the use of their only spare. They reached the dock at Boulogne at 10:30, sailed to England on the cross-Channel packet, and were parking outside The Conservative Club in St. James's Street, London, at 15:20, four minutes before the Blue Train reached Calais, thus winning the bet. The French authorities promptly fined him a sum far greater than his winnings for racing on public roads, and Bentley was excluded from the 1930 Paris Salon for advertising an unauthorized race.

=== The Blue Train Bentley controversy ===
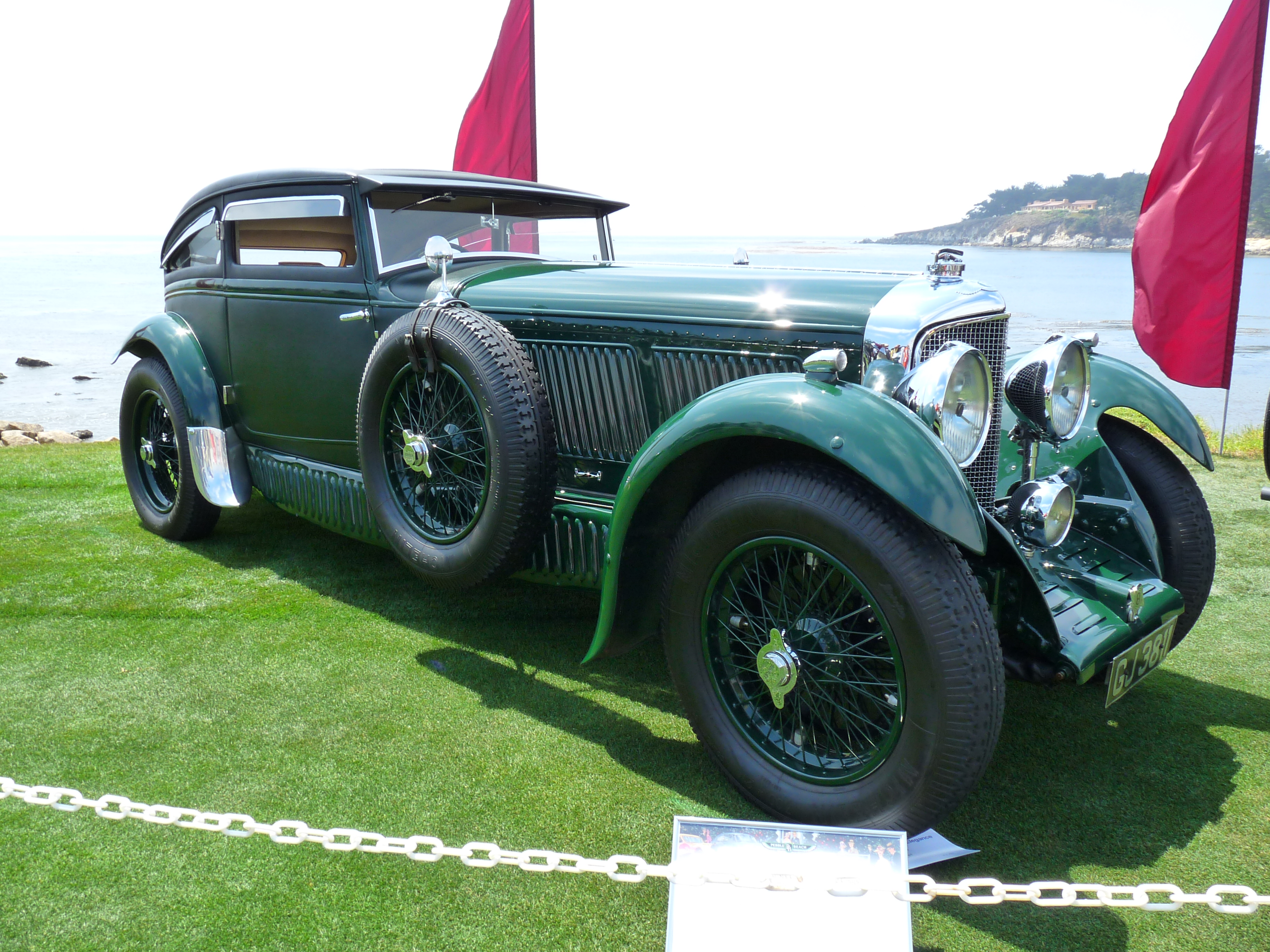
Barnato's Gurney Nutting Sportsman Coupé, often believed to be the car that raced the Blue Train despite being delivered to Barnato weeks after the race.

Barnato drove an H. J. Mulliner-bodied Bentley Speed Six formal saloon during the race, which became known as the Blue Train Bentley. Two months later, on 21 May 1930, he took delivery of a new Bentley Speed Six streamlined fastback "Sportsman Coupe" by Gurney Nutting. Barnato named it the "Blue Train Special" in memory of his race, and it too became commonly referred to as the Blue Train Bentley. The H. J. Mulliner-bodywork was stripped off the original car's chassis to make place for a bespoke replacement, as was common practice for automobiles at that time.

As time passed, the Gurney Nutting-bodied car was regularly mistaken for or erroneously referred to as being the car that had raced the Blue Train. This was reiterated in articles and in Terence Cuneo's painting of the race, which shows the Gurney Nutting coupé just ahead of the train. In 2005 Bentley featured the coupé in the company's promotional material celebrating the race's 75th anniversary.

Careful reading of Barnato's account of the race, published in the 1946 British Racing Drivers' Club review, show that Barnato referred to "my Speed Six saloon," keeping petrol cans in the boot, and having only one spare tyre, while the Sportsman Coupė had no boot and two spare tyres, one on either side of the bonnet. Research efforts by Bruce and Jolene McCaw of Medina, Washington, who bought the Gurney Nutting-built "Blue Train Special", have further exposed and widely publicised the mistake. The original H. J. Mulliner Blue Train Bentley bodywork was also reconstructed, and both cars have been fully restored. They are both currently owned by the McCaws.

== Top Gear Race 'Car vs. Train' ==
The Top Gear television series presented by Jeremy Clarkson, Richard Hammond and James May regularly features various long-distance, "epic", races where Clarkson or one of the other presenters drives a car against other forms of transport.

In a programme aired 9 May 2004, Clarkson drove an Aston Martin DB9 from the Dunsfold studio in Surrey to Monte Carlo against Hammond and May who took the TGV and Eurostar trains. Hammond and May walked 2 miles (3 km) to a bus stop, took a bus to Guildford railway station, train to London Waterloo, then the Eurostar to Gare du Nord, the RER to Gare de Lyon, the TGV to Nice and another train to Monte Carlo.
