= The Colossus of Arcadia =

1938 novel

- First US edition
- Author: E. Phillips Oppenheim
- Language: English
- Genre: Thriller
- Publisher: Hodder and Stoughton (UK); Little, Brown (US)
- Publication date: 1938
- Publication place: United Kingdom
- Media type: Print

The Colossus of Arcadia is a 1938 spy thriller novel by the British writer E. Phillips Oppenheim. Oppenheim enjoyed great popularity in the interwar era for his series of thrillers, often concerning international intrigue. Set in Monaco, a frequent location in the author's novels, it uses passengers arriving and then departing on the Blue Train for its opening and closing chapters.

== Synopsis ==
A variety of travellers arrive in Monte Carlo under the shadow of an expected war between France and Germany. One of them is the heir to a large German banking firm and is under pressure to return to his native country.

== Bibliography ==
- Howarth, Patrick. When the Riviera was Ours. Routledge & K. Paul, 1977.
- Standish, Robert. The Prince of Storytellers: The Life of E. Phillips Oppenheim. P. Davies, 1957.
- Reilly, John M. Twentieth Century Crime & Mystery Writers. Springer, 2015.
