= Bentley =

British luxury automobile manufacturer owned by Volkswagen Group

Bentley Motors Limited
- Formerly: Rolls-Royce Motors Limited (1970–1986); Rolls-Royce Motor Cars Limited (1986–1999); Rolls-Royce & Bentley Motor Cars Limited (1999–2002)
- Type: Subsidiary
- Industry: Automotive
- Founded: 18 January 1919; 107 years ago
- Founders: H. M. Bentley; W. O. Bentley
- Fate: 1931: acquired by Rolls-Royce Limited; 1980: acquired by Vickers; 1998: acquired by Volkswagen Group
- Headquarters: Crewe, United Kingdom
- Area served: Worldwide
- Key people: Frank Walliser (chairman, CEO); John Paul Gregory (Head of Exterior Design); Darren Day (head of interior design)
- Products: Flying Spur; Continental GT; Bentayga
- Production output: ▼10,643 vehicles (2024); 13,560 vehicles (2023); 9,107 vehicles (2012)
- Services: Automobile customisation
- Revenue: ▼€2,650 million (2024); €1,453 million (2012)
- Net income: ▲€8 million (2011); −€245 million (2010)
- Owner: Volkswagen Group (since 1998)
- Number of employees: 3,600 (2013)
- Parent: Audi
- Website: bentleymotors.com

Bentley Motors Limited is a British designer, manufacturer and marketer of luxury cars and SUVs. Headquartered in Crewe, England, the company was founded by W. O. Bentley (1888–1971) in 1919 in Cricklewood, North London, and became widely known for winning the 24 Hours of Le Mans in 1924, 1927, 1928, 1929, 1930, and 2003. Bentley has been a subsidiary of the Volkswagen Group since 1998 and has been consolidated under VW's premium brand arm, Audi, since 2022.

Prominent models extend from the historic sports-racing Bentley 4½ Litre and Bentley Speed Six; the more recent Bentley S Type Continental, Bentley Turbo R, and Bentley Arnage; to its current model line, including the Flying Spur, Continental GT and Bentayga which are marketed worldwide, with China as its largest market as of November 2012.

Today most Bentley models are assembled at the company's Crewe factory, with a small number assembled at Volkswagen's Dresden factory, Germany, and with bodies for the Continental manufactured in Zwickau and for the Bentayga manufactured at the Volkswagen Bratislava Plant.

The joining and eventual separation of Bentley and Rolls-Royce followed a series of mergers and acquisitions, beginning with the 1931 purchase by Rolls-Royce of Bentley, then in receivership. In 1971, Rolls-Royce itself was forced into receivership and the UK government nationalised the company—splitting it into an aerospace company (Rolls-Royce Plc) and an automotive company (Rolls-Royce Motors Limited, including Bentley). Rolls-Royce Motors was subsequently sold to engineering conglomerate Vickers, and in 1998, Vickers sold Rolls-Royce to Volkswagen AG, including Bentley with its name and logos (but not the name "Rolls-Royce").

== Cricklewood (1919–1931) ==
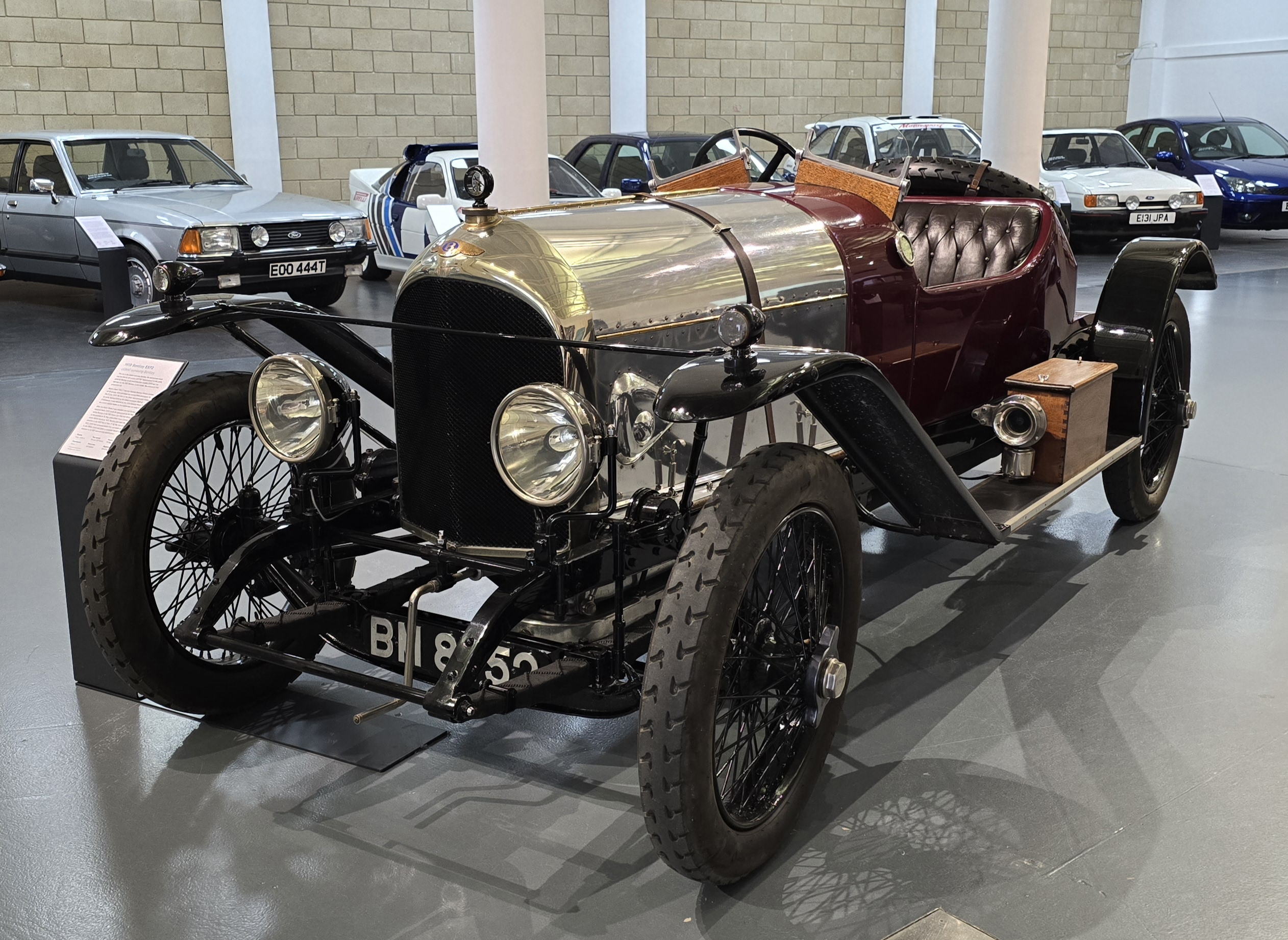
1919 Bentley EXP2 (Experimental nr. 2), the oldest surviving Bentley

Before the First World War, W. O. Bentley and his brother, Horace Millner Bentley, sold French Doriot, Flandrin & Parant (DFP) cars in Cricklewood, North London, but W. O. Bentley wanted to design and build his own cars. At the DFP factory, in 1913, he noticed an aluminium paperweight and thought that aluminium might be a suitable replacement for cast iron to fabricate lighter pistons. The first Bentley aluminium pistons were fitted to Sopwith Camel aero engines during the First World War.

The same day that the Paris Peace Conference started, 18 January 1919, W. O. Bentley founded Bentley Motors (Bentley Motors Ltd was formally registered as a company in August 2019). The first two recruits were draughtsmen: Harry Varley, formerly of Vauxhall Motors and Frederick Tasker Burgess, formerly of Humber Limited where he had been chief designer and responsible for the design of the 1914 TT Humber race cars which had a four-cylinder DOHC engine with four valves per cylinder. It has been suggested that Burgess's principal role at Bentley motors was to turn Bentley's ideas into accurate drawings. The early efforts of the company centred around the creation of a new 3-litre engine, designed by W.O. Bentley, incorporating an overhead camshaft designed by Ex–Royal Flying Corps officer Clive Gallop, who joined Bentley in June 1919. In November the company exhibited a car chassis (with a dummy engine) at the Olympia London Motor Show.. By December the first engine was built and running. Delivery of the first cars was scheduled for June 1920, but development took longer than estimated so the date was extended to September 1921.

The first two cars, EXP1 and EXP2, were used for development purposes, but the third car was sold to South Wales coal mining engineer Ivor Llewelyn, the father of actor Desmond Llewelyn. The durability of the first Bentley cars earned widespread acclaim, and they competed in hill climbs and raced at Brooklands.

Bentley's first major event was the 1922 Indianapolis 500, a race dominated by specialized cars with Duesenberg racing chassis. They entered a modified road car driven by works driver Douglas Hawkes, accompanied by riding mechanic H. S. "Bertie" Browning. Hawkes completed the full 500 miles (800 km) and finished 13th with an average speed of 74.95 miles per hour (120.62 km/h) after starting in 19th position. The team was then rushed back to England to compete in the 1922 RAC Tourist Trophy, in the Isle of Man.

=== Cricklewood Bentleys ===
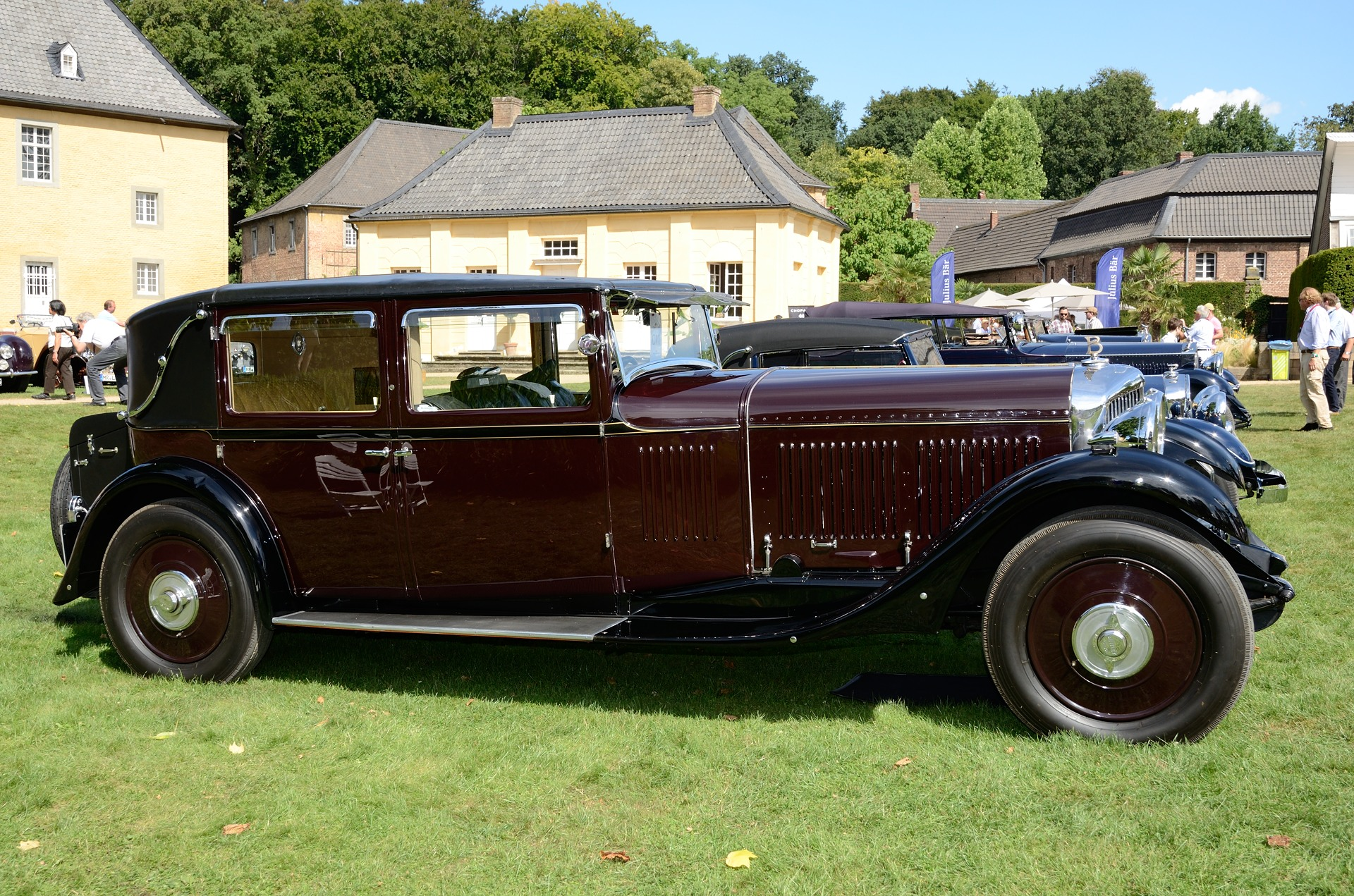
Bentley 8 Litre 4-door sports saloon

- 1921–1929 3-litre
- 1926–1931 6½-litre
- 1927–1931 4½-litre & "Blower Bentley"
- 1928–1931 6½-litre Speed Six
- 1930–1931 8-litre
- 1931 4-litre

The original model was the three-litre, but as customers put heavier saloon bodies on the chassis, a larger six-cylinder 6½-litre model followed in 1926. In 1927 the 4½-litre engine was created by cutting two cylinders from the 6½-litre engine. Installed in a long 3-litre chassis, it was entered into the 1927 24 Hours of Le Mans but crashed out whilst leading the race. Driven by Woolf Barnato and Bernard Rubin a 4½-litre car won Le Mans outright in 1928. Derived from the short-chassis 4½-litre, perhaps the most iconic model of the period is the "Blower Bentley", with its distinctive supercharger projecting forward from the bottom of the grille. Uncharacteristically fragile for a Bentley it was not the reliable workhorse the 4½-litre was, though in 1930 Birkin remarkably finished second in the French Grand Prix at Pau in a stripped-down racing version of the Blower Bentley, behind Philippe Etancelin in a Bugatti Type 35.

The 4½-litre model later became famous in popular media as the vehicle of choice of James Bond in the original novels, but this has been seen only briefly in the films. John Steed in the television series The Avengers also drove a Bentley.

A lighter-weight 6½-litre model, the Bentley Speed Six was introduced in 1928. This was arguably the most successful of all the racing Bentleys, achieving a remarkable 1-2-3-4 finish in the 1929 Le Mans race, and 1-2 the following year (1930).

Launched in 1930, the new 8-litre was so impressively quiet and powerful that when Barnato's money ran out in 1931, and Napier was planning to buy Bentley's business, Rolls-Royce - its identity hidden via an entity called the British Equitable Central Trust - purchased Bentley Motors to prevent it from competing with their most expensive model, the Phantom II, with Henry Royce quoted as saying of the 8-litre, 'We can see in which way it can be better than we are,' and regarding Bentley Motors Ltd, 'The makers are clearly out to capture our trade.'

=== Woolf Barnato acquires control (1926) ===
The early days of the Bentley enterprise were always underfunded, but inspired by the 1924 Le Mans win by John Duff and Frank Clement, and his own success racing Bentley cars at Brooklands, Woolf Barnato, who had inherited a fortune accumulated by his father's South African gold and diamond mines, financed Bentley's business in May 1926. Barnato had incorporated Baromans Ltd in 1922, which existed as his finance and investment vehicle. Via Baromans, Barnato initially invested in excess of £100,000, saving the business and its workforce. A financial reorganisation of the original Bentley company was carried out and all existing creditors paid off for £75,000. Existing shares were devalued from £1 each to just 1 shilling, or 5% of their original value. Barnato held 149,500 of the new shares giving him control of the company and he became chairman. Barnato injected further cash into the business: £35,000 secured by debenture in July 1927; £40,000 in 1928; £25,000 in 1929. With renewed financial input, W. O. Bentley was able to design another generation of cars.

=== The Bentley Boys ===
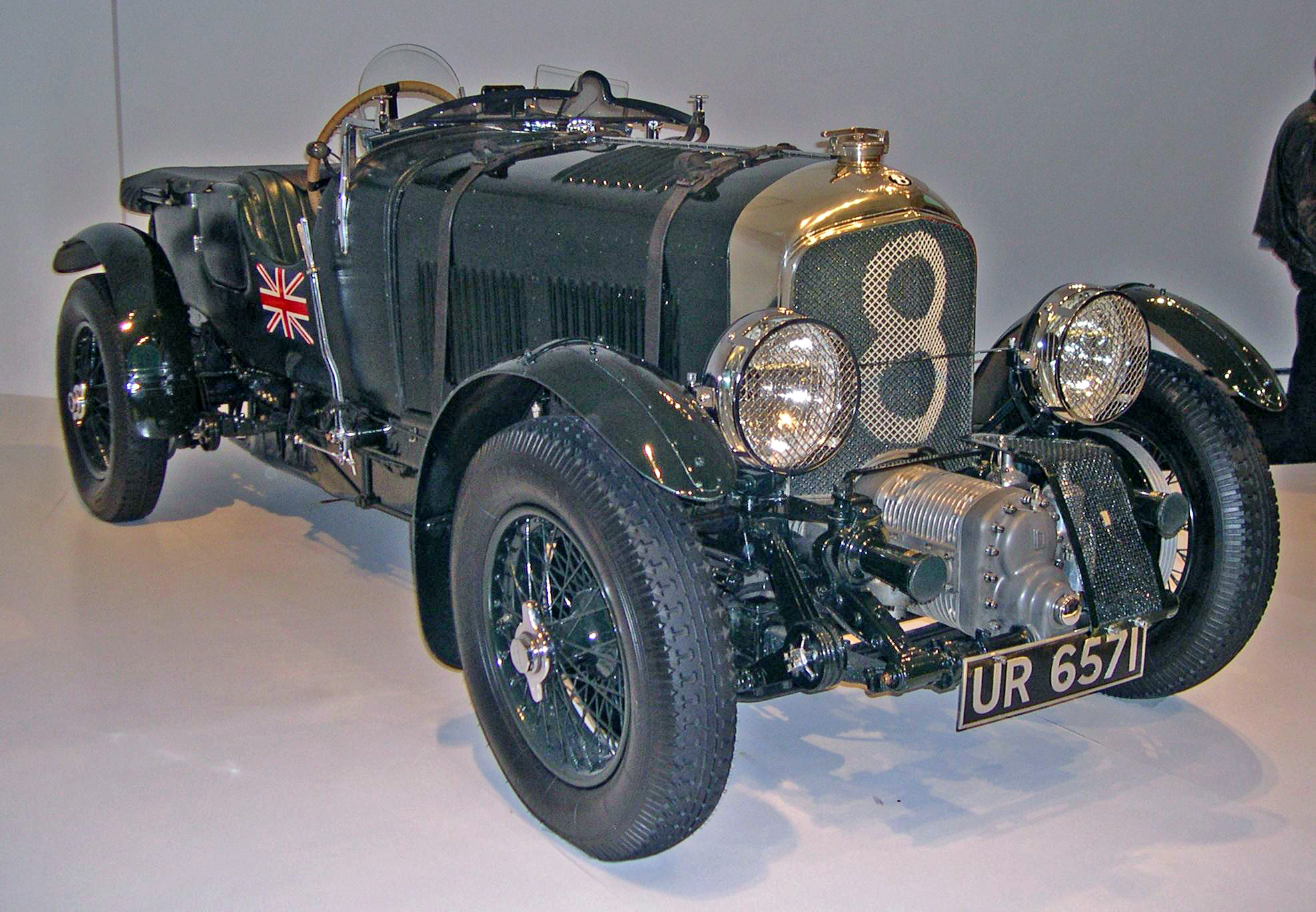
1929 Blower Bentley

The Bentley Boys were a group of British motoring enthusiasts that included Barnato, Sir Henry "Tim" Birkin, steeple chaser George Duller, aviator Glen Kidston, automotive journalist S.C.H. "Sammy" Davis, and Dudley Benjafield. The Bentley Boys favoured Bentley cars. Many were independently wealthy and many had a military background. They kept the marque's reputation for high performance alive; Bentley was noted for its four consecutive victories at the 24 Hours of Le Mans, from 1927 to 1930.

Birkin developed the 4½-litre, lightweight Blower Bentley at Welwyn Garden City in 1929 and produced five racing specials, starting with Bentley Blower No.1 which was optimised for the Brooklands racing circuit. WO Bentley was vehemently against the project, stating that to supercharge its engine was to 'pervert its design and corrupt its performance.' However, Birkin had money available to purchase 50 4½-litre cars, money which Bentley Motors urgently needed. Barnato overruled WO Bentley and Birkin purchased them, adding the superchargers in his own workshop. As predicted by WO Bentley the result was not a success. Undoubtedly fast, the overstressed engine components meant that Blower Bentleys were unreliable. None ever won a race.

Blue Train Races: In March 1930, Barnato raised the stakes on the Rover and its Rover Light Six, which had recently raced and beaten Le Train Bleu from Cannes to Calais. Barnato wagered £100 that he could better that record with his 6½-litre Bentley Speed Six, and that by the time the train arrived in Calais, he would already be in his club in London. Travelling on public highways, he raced the train from Cannes to Calais, then by ferry to Dover, and finally London, and won.

Barnato drove his H.J. Mulliner–bodied formal saloon in the race against the Blue Train. Two months later, on 21 May 1930, he took delivery of a Speed Six with streamlined fastback "sportsman coupé" by Gurney Nutting. Both cars became known as the "Blue Train Bentleys"; the latter is regularly mistaken for, or erroneously referred to as being, the car that raced the Blue Train, while in fact Barnato named it in memory of his race. A painting by Terence Cuneo depicts the Gurney Nutting coupé racing along a road parallel to the Blue Train, which scenario never occurred as the road and railway did not follow the same route and the Gurney Nutting coupé never raced the Blue Train.

=== 24 Hours of Le Mans Grand Prix d'Endurance ===
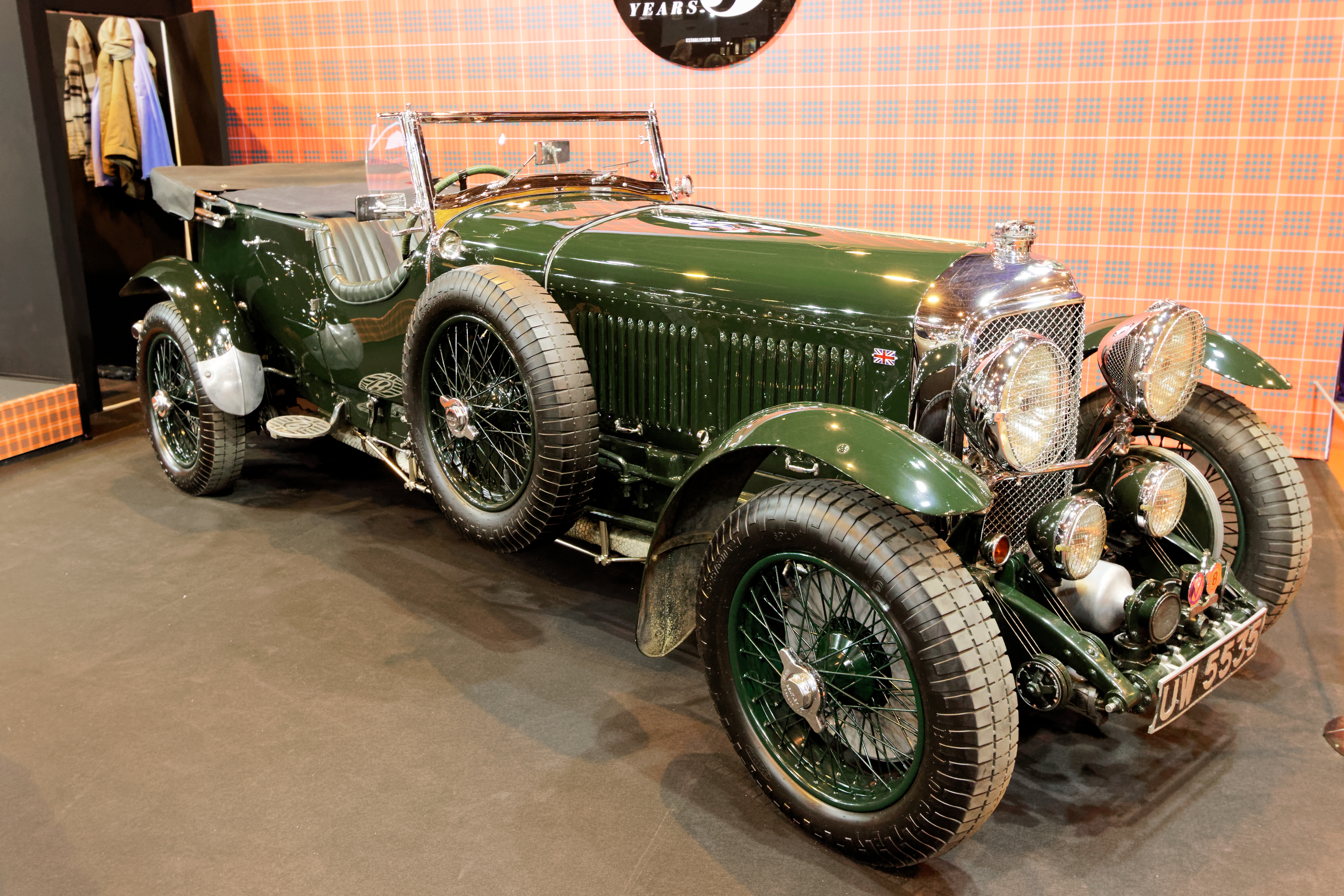
Bentley Speed Six

Bentley had a dominant presence at the 24 Hours of Le Mans during the 1920s and early 1930s, achieving multiple victories with its 3-litre and 4½-litre cars, including the legendary Speed Six.

- 1923 – 4th (private entry, 3-Litre)
- 1924 – 1st (3-Litre, works entry)
- 1925 – did not finish
- 1926 – did not finish
- 1927 – 1st, 15th, 17th (3-Litre)
- 1928 – 1st, 5th (4½-Litre)
- 1929 – 1st (Speed Six); 2nd, 3rd, 4th (4½-Litre)
- 1930 – 1st, 2nd (Speed Six)

Bentley withdrew from motor racing after the 1930 Le Mans, stating that they had “learned enough about speed and reliability.”

=== Additional references ===
- Martin Bennett, Bentley: The Vintage Years, 2009.
- Graham Robson, Bentley: A Legend Reborn, 2013.
- Le Mans race results database

== Liquidation (1931) ==
The Wall Street crash of 1929 and the resulting Great Depression throttled the demand for Bentley's expensive motor cars. In July 1931 two mortgage payments were due which neither the company nor Barnato, the guarantor, were able to meet. On 10 July 1931 a receiver was appointed.

Napier offered to buy Bentley with the purchase to be final in November 1931. Instead, British Central Equitable Trust made a winning sealed bid of £125,000. British Central Equitable Trust later proved to be a front for Rolls-Royce Limited. Not even Bentley himself knew the identity of the purchaser until the deal was completed.

Barnato received £42,000 for his shares in Bentley Motors. In 1934 he was appointed to the board of the new Bentley Motors (1931) Ltd. In the same year Bentley confirmed that it would continue racing.

== Rolls-Royce (1931–1970) ==
=== Derby ===
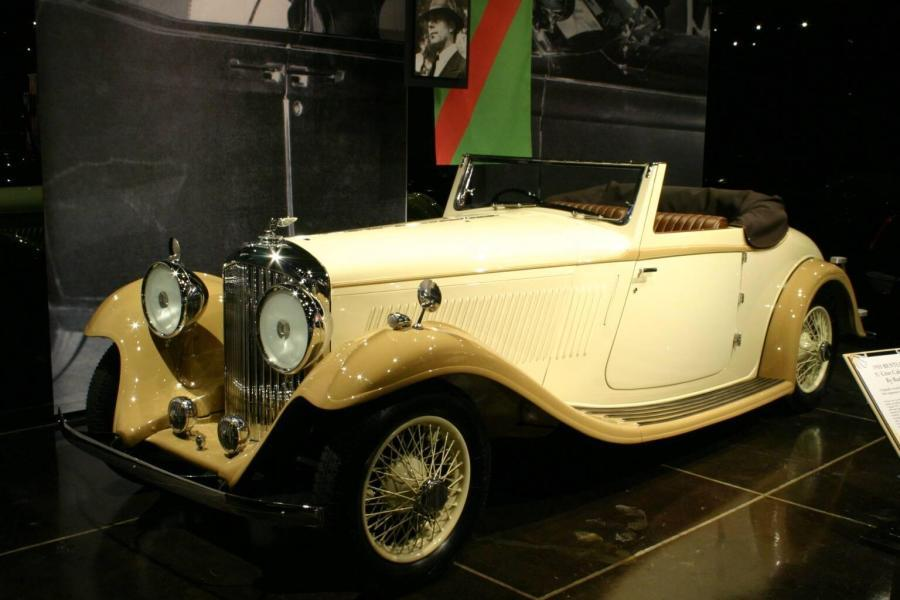
"The silent sports car" 1935 Bentley 3½ litre cabriolet by unknown coachbuilder

Rolls-Royce took over the assets of Bentley Motors (1919) Ltd and formed a subsidiary, Bentley Motors (1931) Ltd. Rolls-Royce had acquired the Bentley showrooms in Cork Street, the service station at Kingsbury, the complex at Cricklewood and the services of Bentley himself. This last was disputed by Napier in court without success. Bentley had neglected to register their trademark so Rolls-Royce immediately did so. They also sold the Cricklewood factory in 1932. Production stopped for two years, before resuming at the Rolls-Royce works in Derby. Unhappy with his role at Rolls-Royce, when his contract expired at the end of April 1935 W. O. Bentley left to join Lagonda.

When the new Bentley 3½ litre appeared in 1933, it was a sporting variant of the Rolls-Royce 20/25, which disappointed some traditional customers yet was well received by many others. W. O. Bentley was reported as saying, "Taking all things into consideration, I would rather own this Bentley than any other car produced under that name". Rolls-Royce's advertisements for the 3 1/2 Litre called it "the silent sports car", a slogan Rolls-Royce continued to use for Bentley cars until the 1950s.

All Bentleys produced from 1931 to 2004 used inherited or shared Rolls-Royce chassis, and adapted Rolls-Royce engines, and are described by critics as badge-engineered Rolls-Royces.

==== Derby Bentleys ====
- 1933–1937 3½-litre
  - 1936–1939 4¼-litre
- 1939–1941 Mark V
  - 1939 Mark V

=== Crewe ===
In preparation for war, Rolls-Royce and the British Government searched for a location for a shadow factory to ensure production of aero-engines. Crewe, with its excellent road and rail links, as well as being located in the North West away from the aerial bombing starting in mainland Europe, was a logical choice. Crewe also had extensive open farming land. Construction of the factory started on a 60-acre area on the potato fields of Merrill's Farm in July 1938, with the first Rolls-Royce Merlin aero-engine rolling off the production line five months later. 25,000 Merlin engines were produced, and at its peak, in 1943 during World War II, the factory employed 10,000 people. With the war in Europe over and the general move towards the then new jet engines, Rolls-Royce concentrated its aero-engine operations at Derby and moved motor car operations to Crewe.

==== Standard Steel saloons ====
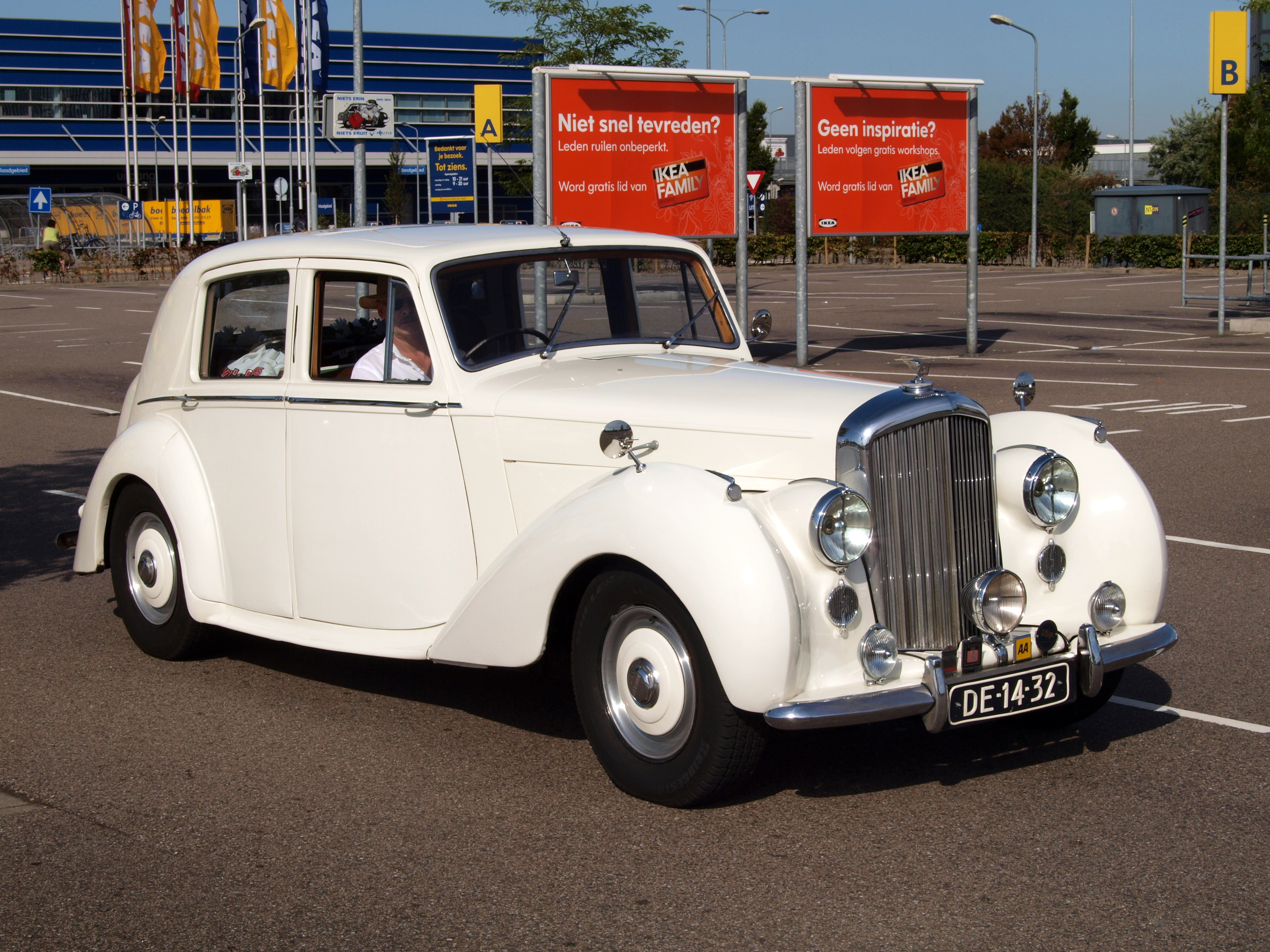
Bentley Mark VI standard steel saloon, the first Bentley supplied by Rolls-Royce with a standard all-steel body

Until some time after World War II, most high-end motorcar manufacturers like Bentley and Rolls-Royce did not supply complete cars. They sold rolling chassis that were near-complete from the instrument panel forward. Each chassis was delivered to the coachbuilder of the buyer's choice. The biggest specialist car dealerships had coachbuilders build standard designs for them which were held in stock awaiting potential buyers.

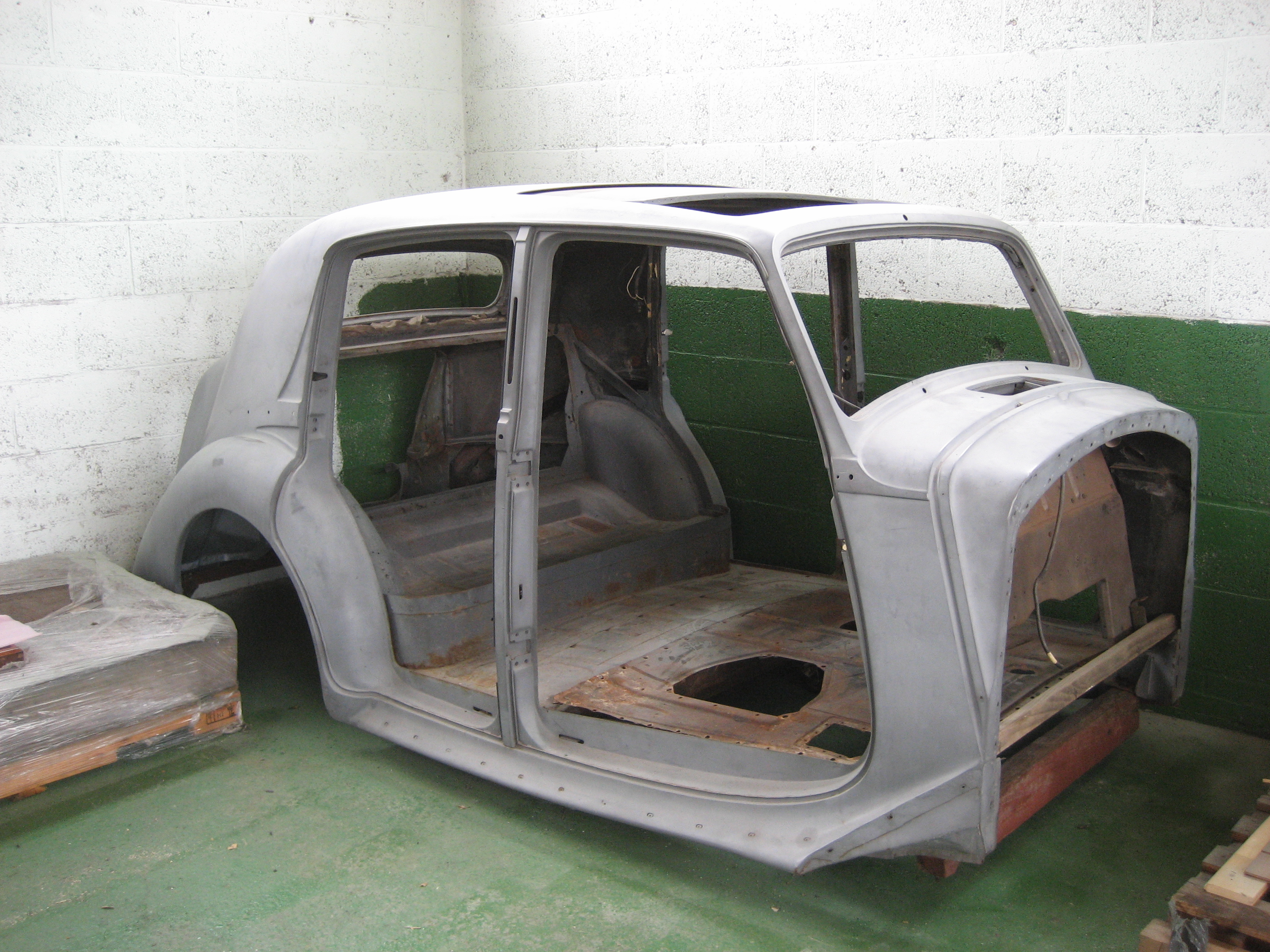
The assembled pressings from Pressed Steel

To meet post-war demand, particularly UK Government pressure to export and earn overseas currency, Rolls-Royce developed an all-steel body using pressings made by Pressed Steel to create a "standard" ready-to-drive complete saloon car. The first steel-bodied model produced was the Bentley Mark VI: these started to emerge from the newly reconfigured Crewe factory early in 1946. Some years later, initially only for export, the Rolls-Royce Silver Dawn was introduced, a standard steel Bentley but with a Rolls-Royce radiator grille for a small extra charge, and this convention continued. Chassis remained available to coachbuilders until the end of production of the Bentley S3, which was replaced for October 1965 by the monocoque construction T series.

==== Bentley Continental ====
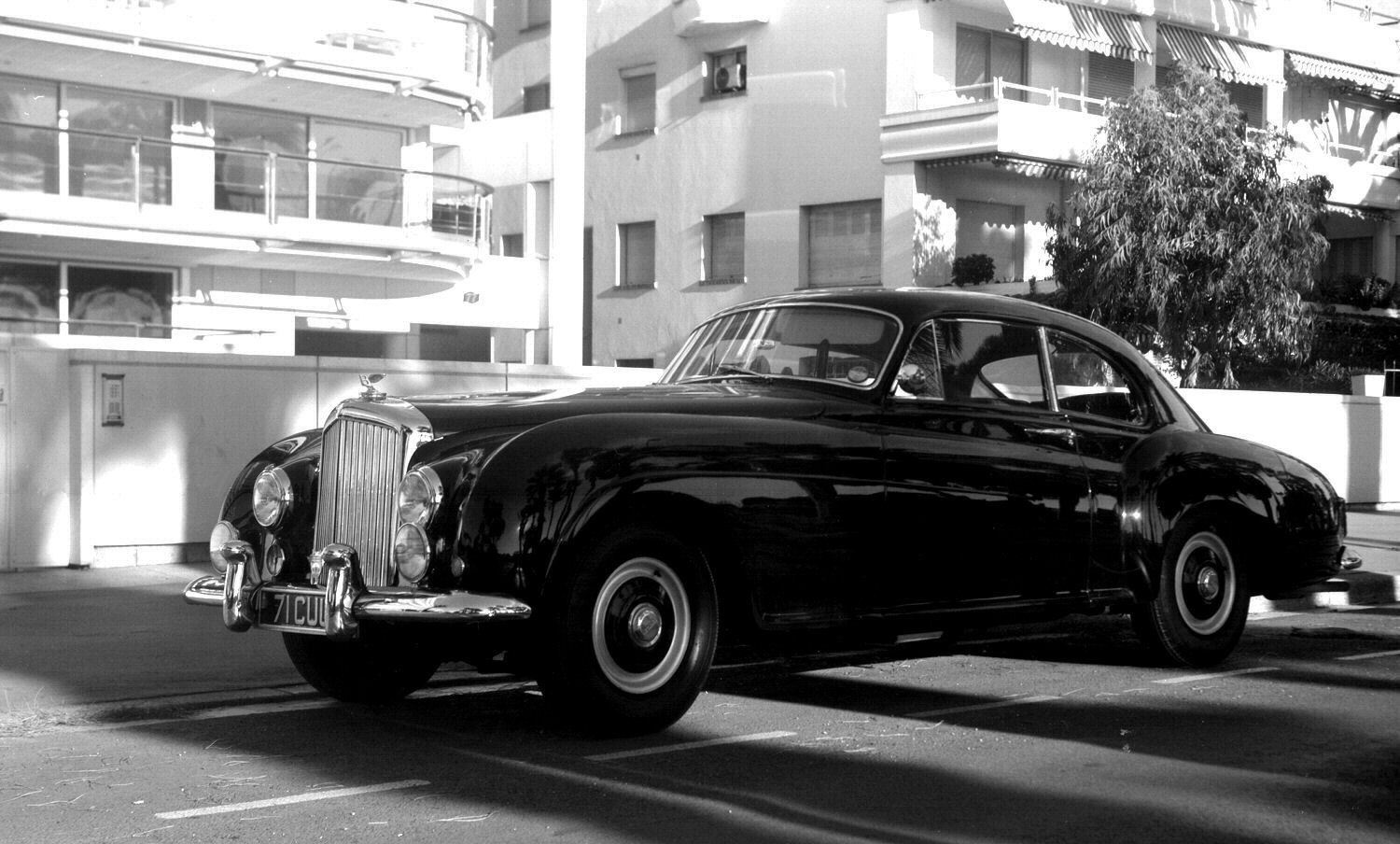
Bentley Continental S, with a fastback coupé body by H. J. Mulliner

The Continental was aimed at the UK market, most cars, 164 plus a prototype, being right-hand drive. The chassis was produced at the Crewe factory and shared many components with the standard R type. Other than the R-Type standard steel saloon, R-Type Continentals were delivered as rolling chassis to the coachbuilder of choice. Coachwork for most of these cars was completed by H. J. Mulliner & Co., which mainly produced them in fastback coupé form. Other coachwork came from Park Ward (London), which built six, later including a drophead coupe version. Franay (Paris) built five, Graber (Wichtrach, Switzerland) built three, one of them later altered by Köng (Basel, Switzerland), and Pininfarina made one. James Young (London) built in 1954 a Sports Saloon for its owner, James Barclay. The early R Type Continental has essentially the same engine as the standard R Type, but with modified carburation, induction and exhaust manifolds, and higher gear ratios. After July 1954 the car was fitted with a more powerful engine, which was bored out to 94.62 mm (3.7 in) (creating a total displacement of 4,887 cc (4.9 L; 298.2 cu in)) and had its compression ratio raised to 7.25:1.

==== Crewe Rolls-Royce Bentleys ====
Bentleys made by Rolls-Royce Ltd. in Crewe

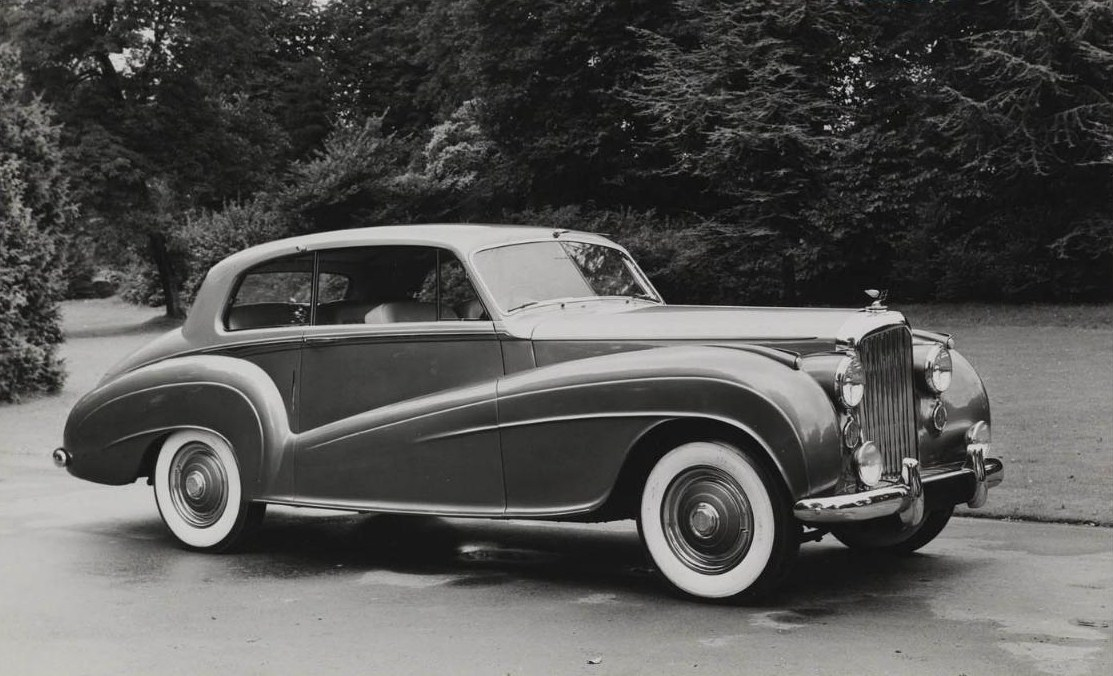
"The silent sports car"
1952 Bentley 4¼ Litre 2-door by H J Mulliner

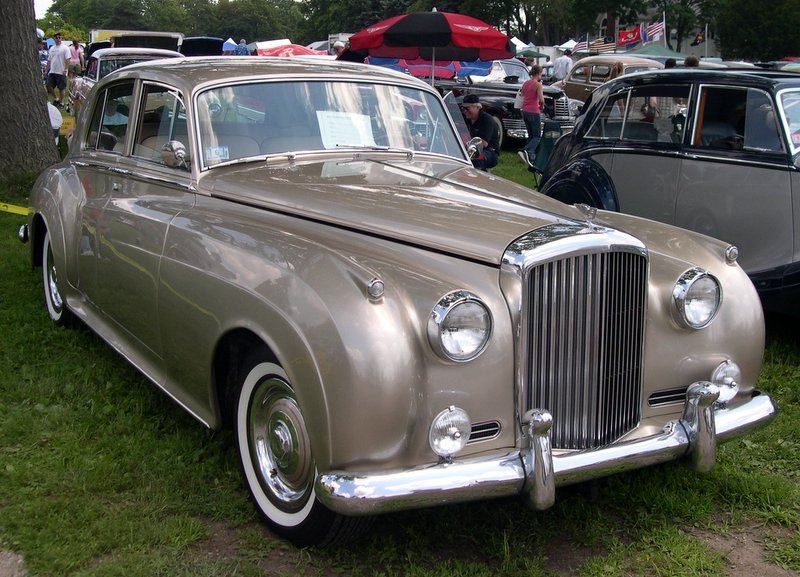
Bentley S series Standard Saloon (S2)

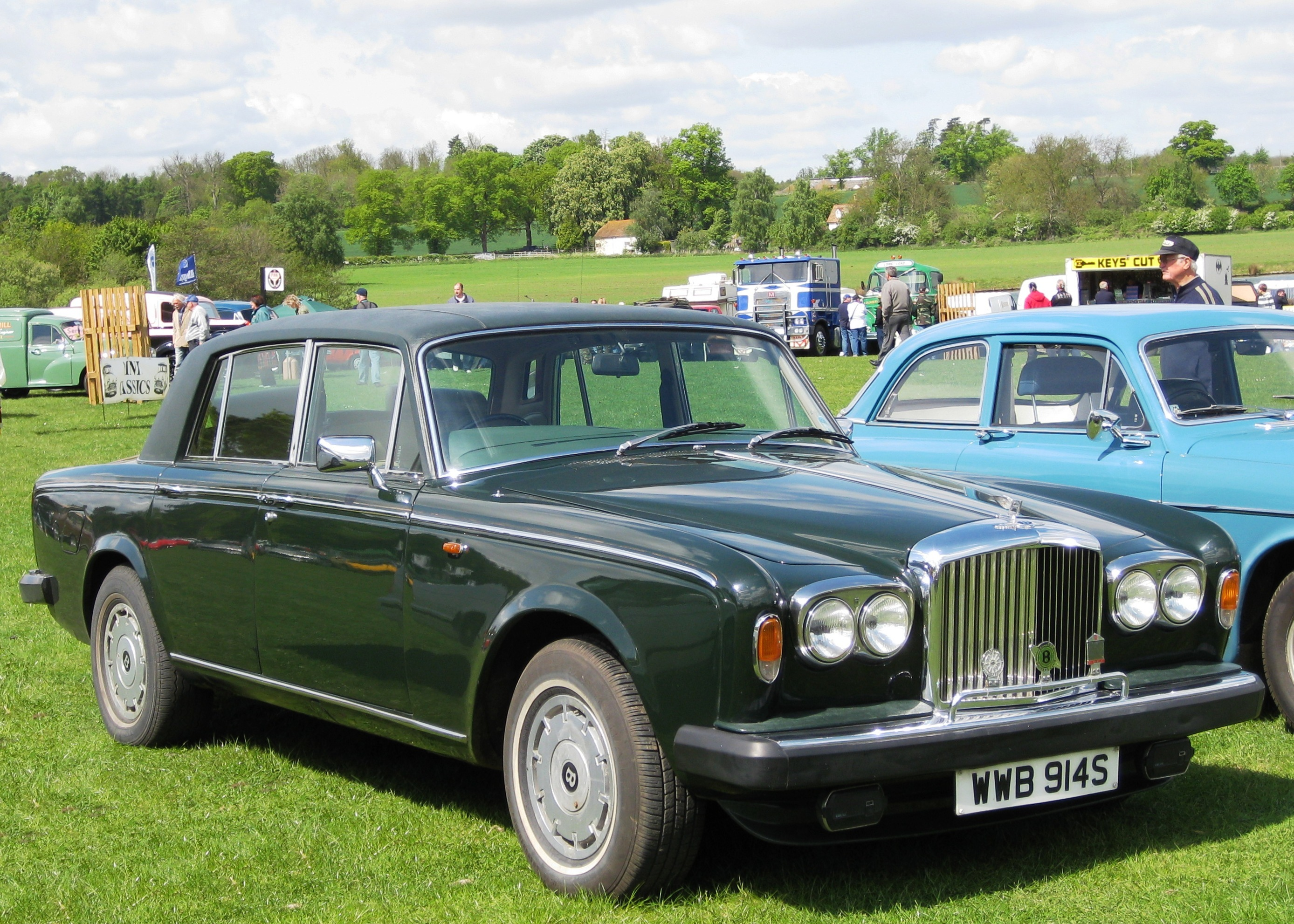
Bentley T-series Standard Saloon (lwb)
- Standard-steel saloon
  - 1946–1952 Mark VI
  - 1952–1955 R Type
- Continental
  - 1952–1955 R Type Continental
- S-series
  - 1955–1959 S1 and Continental
  - 1959–1962 S2 and Continental
  - 1962–1965 S3 and Continental
- T-series
  - 1965–1977 T1
  - 1977–1980 T2
- 1971–1984 Corniche (renamed Continental in 1984)

== Vickers (1970–1998) ==
Problems that Bentley's owner, Rolls-Royce, experienced with development of the RB211 aero engine brought about a financial collapse in 1970.

The motorcar division was made a separate business, Rolls-Royce Motors Limited, which remained independent until bought by Vickers plc in August 1980. By the 1970s and early 1980s Bentley sales had fallen badly; at one point less than 5% of combined production carried the Bentley badge. Under Vickers, Bentley set about regaining its high-performance heritage, typified by the 1980 Mulsanne. Bentley's restored sporting image created a renewed interest in the name and Bentley sales as a proportion of output began to rise. By 1986 the Bentley:Rolls-Royce ratio had reached 40:60; by 1991 it achieved parity.

=== Crewe Vickers Bentleys ===
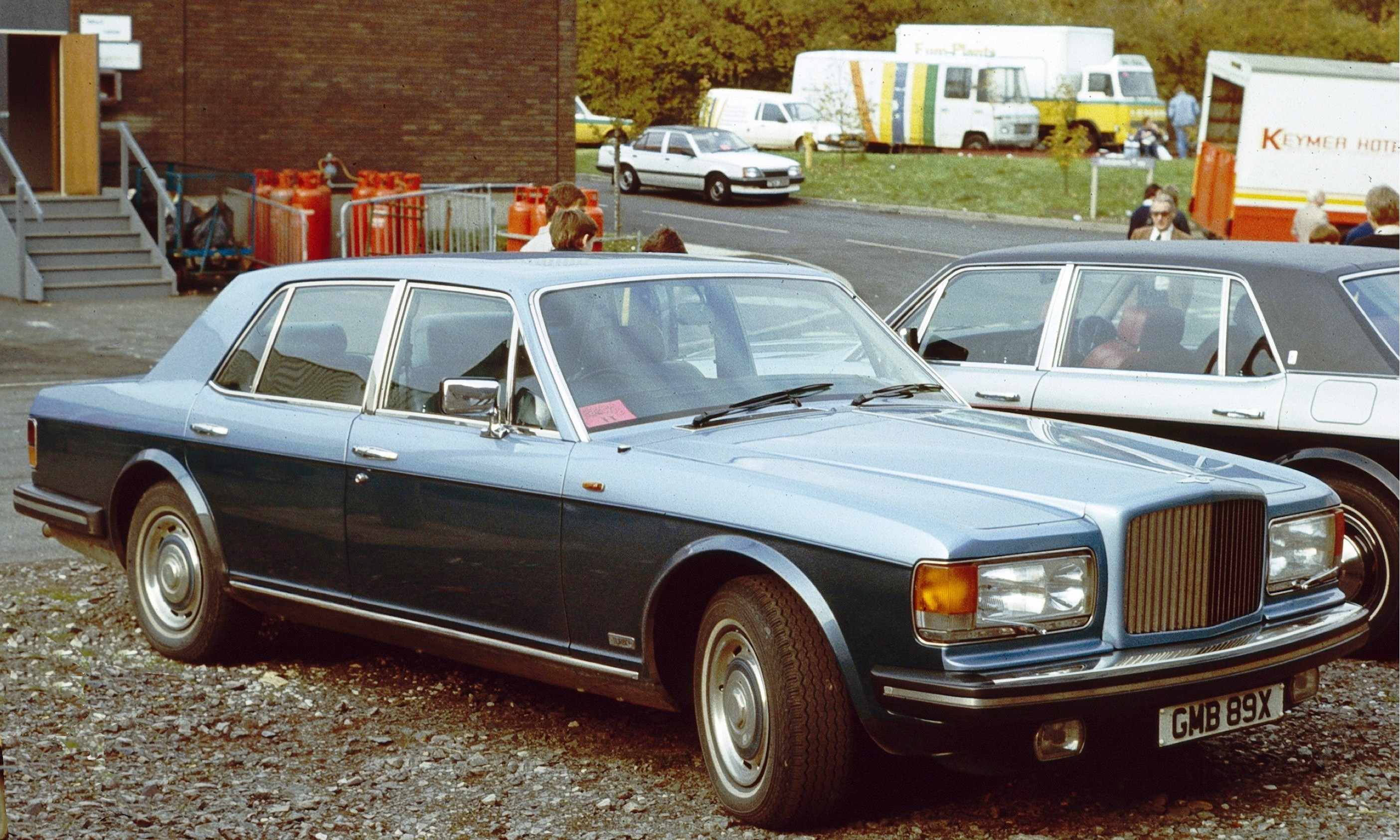
1984 Bentley Mulsanne Turbo

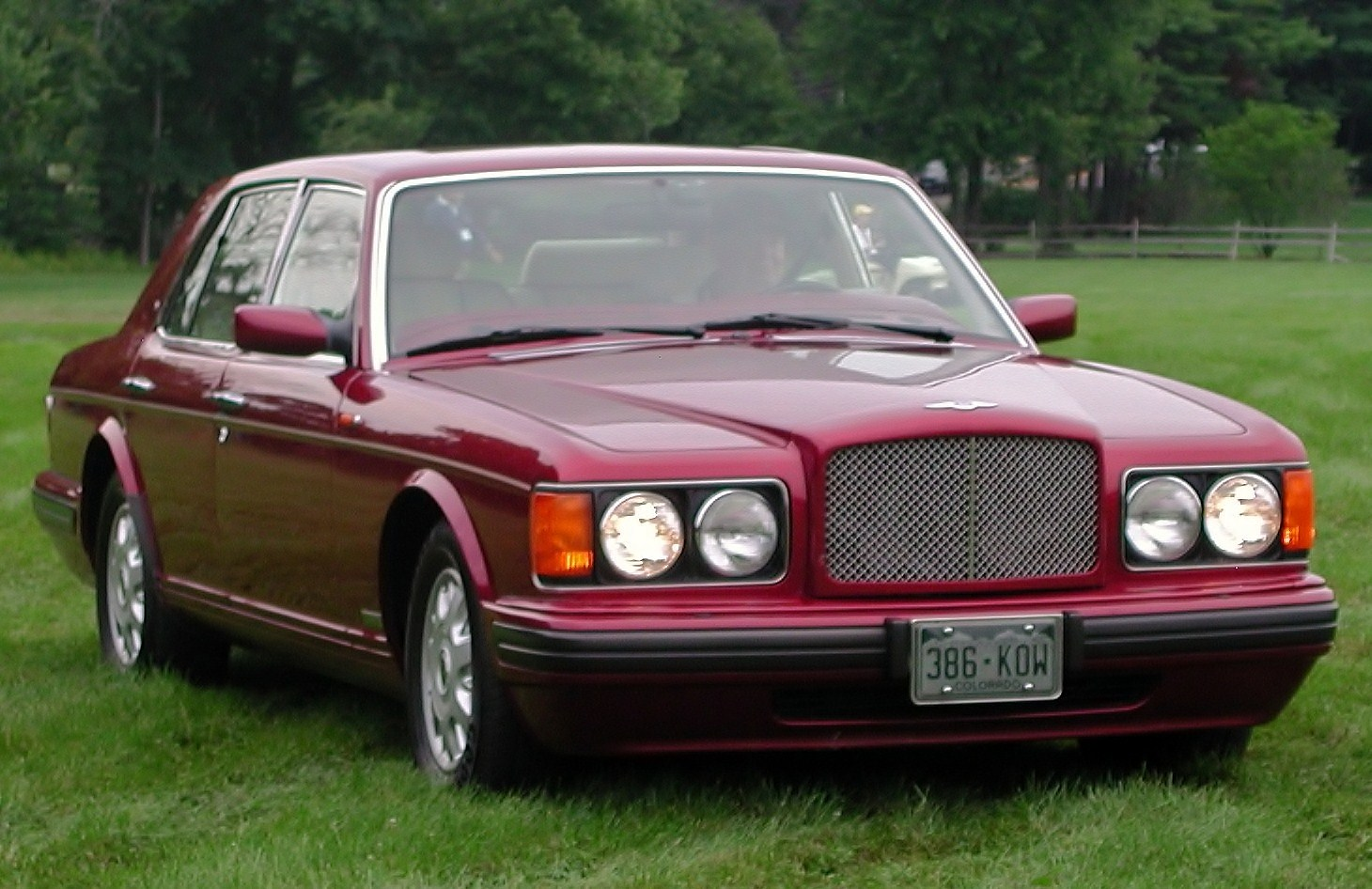
1997 Bentley Brooklands

- 1980–1992 Bentley Mulsanne
  - 1984–1988 Mulsanne L: limousine
  - 1982–1985 Mulsanne Turbo
  - 1987–1992 Mulsanne S
- 1984–1995 Continental: convertible
  - 1992–1995 Continental Turbo
- 1984–1992 Eight: basic model
- 1985–1995 Turbo R: turbocharged performance version
- 1991–2002 Continental R: turbocharged 2-door model
  - 1994–1995 Continental S: intercooled
  - 1996–2002 Continental T
  - 1999–2003 Continental R Mulliner: performance model
- 1992–1998 Brooklands: improved Eight
  - 1996–1998 Brooklands R: performance Brooklands
- 1994–1995 Turbo S: limited-edition sports model
- 1994–1995 Continental S: to order only version of Continental R with features of Turbo S incorporated
- 1995–1997 New Turbo R: updated 96MY Turbo R with revised bumpers, single front door glazing, new door mirrors, spare in trunk, engine cover, new seat design, auto lights, auto wipers etc.
- 1995–2003 Azure: convertible Continental R
- 1996–2002 Continental T: short-wheelbase performance model
- 1997–1998 Turbo RL: "new" Turbo R LWB (Long Wheel Base)
- 1997–1998 Bentley Turbo RT: replacement for the Turbo RL
  - 1997–1998 RT Mulliner: Ultra exclusive performance model

== Volkswagen (1998–present) ==
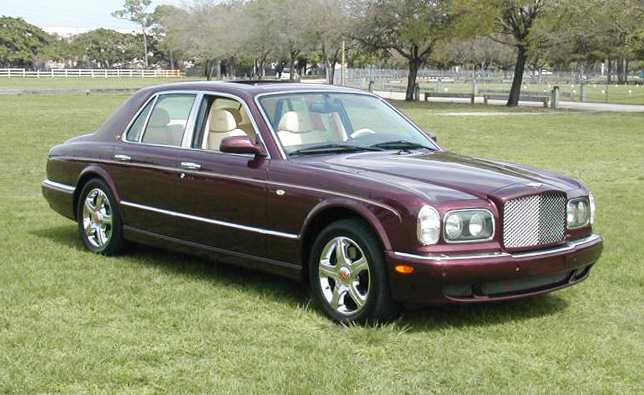
1998 Bentley Arnage T

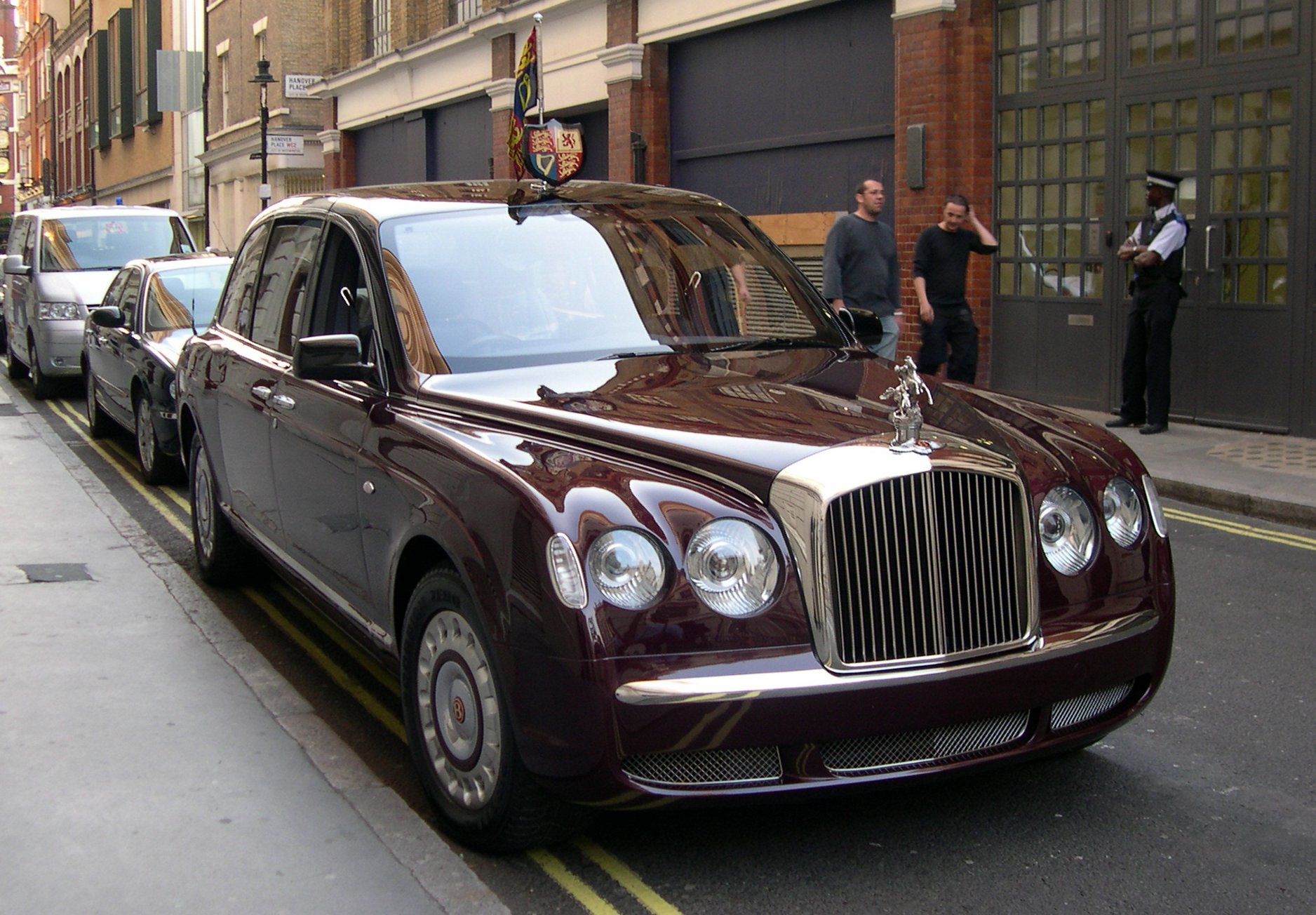
Queen Elizabeth II's Bentley State Limousine

In October 1997, Vickers announced that it had decided to sell Rolls-Royce Motors. BMW AG seemed to be a logical purchaser because BMW already supplied engines and other components for Bentley and Rolls-Royce branded cars and because of BMW and Vickers joint efforts in building aircraft engines. BMW made a final offer of £340m, but was outbid by Volkswagen AG, which offered £430m. Volkswagen AG acquired the vehicle designs, model nameplates, production and administrative facilities, the Spirit of Ecstasy and Rolls-Royce grille shape trademarks, but not the rights to the use of the Rolls-Royce name or logo, which are owned by Rolls-Royce Holdings plc. In 1998, BMW started supplying components for the new range of Rolls-Royce and Bentley cars—notably V8 engines for the Bentley Arnage and V12 engines for the Rolls-Royce Silver Seraph, however, the supply contract allowed BMW to terminate its supply deal with Rolls-Royce with 12 months' notice, which would not be enough time for Volkswagen to re-engineer the cars.

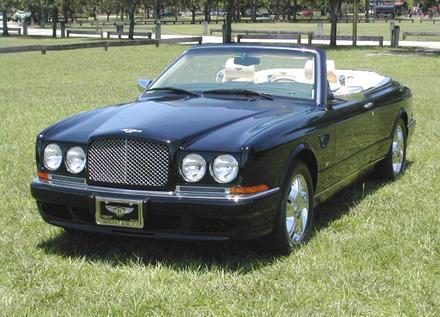
Bentley Azure Mulliner 2003 Final Series

BMW paid Rolls-Royce plc £40m to license the Rolls-Royce name and logo. After negotiations, BMW and Volkswagen AG agreed that, from 1998 to 2002, BMW would continue to supply engines and components and would allow Volkswagen temporary use of the Rolls-Royce name and logo. All BMW engine supply ended in 2003 with the end of Silver Seraph production.

From 1 January 2003 forward, Volkswagen AG would be the sole provider of cars with the "Bentley" marque. BMW established a new legal entity, Rolls-Royce Motor Cars Limited, and built a new administrative headquarters and production facility for Rolls-Royce branded vehicles in Goodwood, West Sussex, England.

=== Investment and company development ===
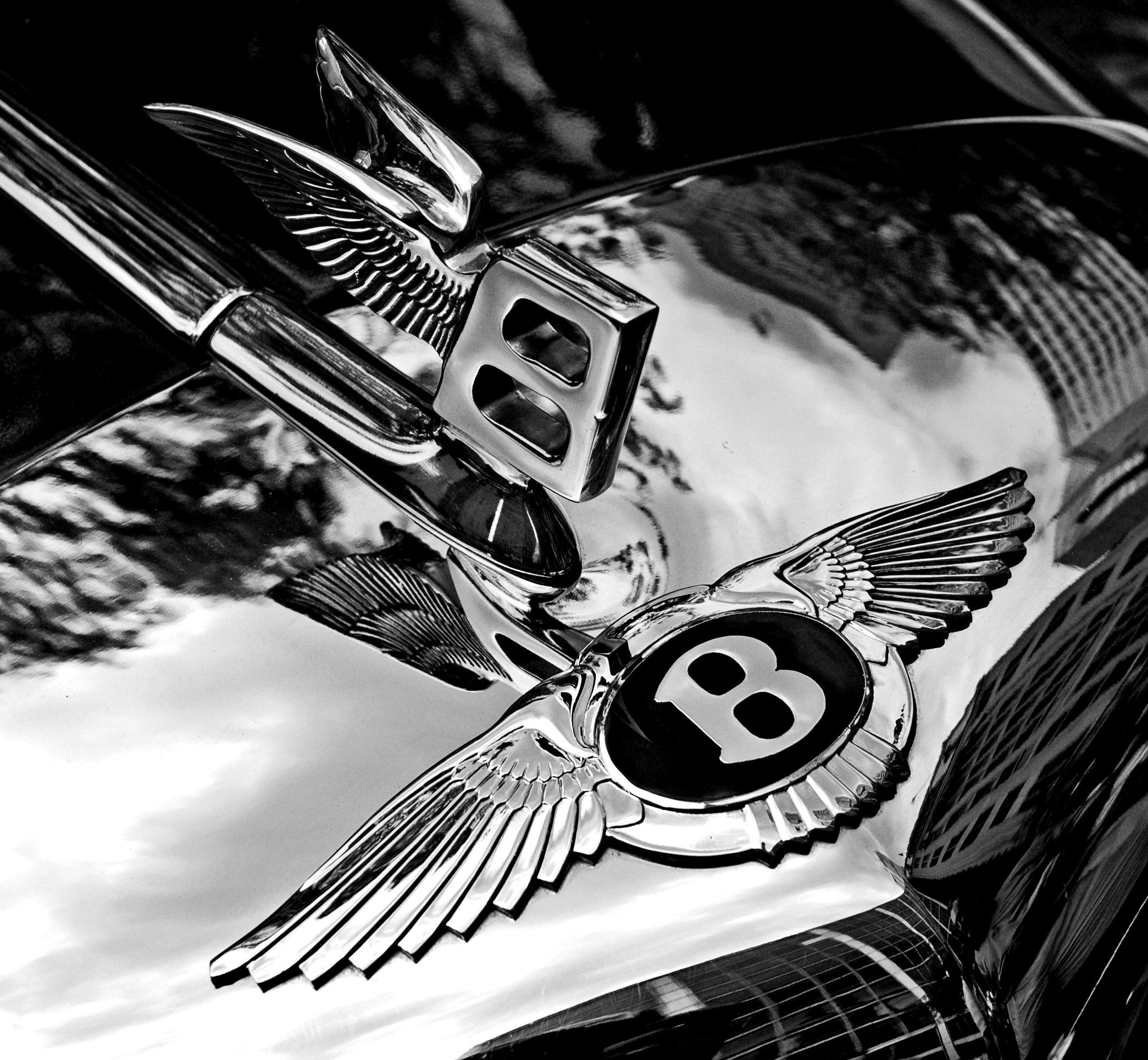
Bentley winged "B" badge bonnet (hood) ornament

After acquiring the business, Volkswagen spent £500 million (about US$845 million) to modernise the Crewe factory and increase production capacity. As of early 2010, there are about 3,500 working at Crewe, compared with about 1,500 in 1998 before being taken over by Volkswagen. It was reported that Volkswagen invested a total of nearly US$2 billion in Bentley and its revival. As a result of upgrading facilities at Crewe the bodywork now arrives fully painted at the Crewe facility for final assembly, with the parts coming from Germany—similarly Rolls-Royce body shells are painted and shipped to the UK for assembly only.

Demand had been so great that the factory at Crewe was unable to meet orders despite an installed capacity of approximately 9,500 vehicles per year; there was a waiting list of over a year for new cars to be delivered. Consequently, part of the production of the new Flying Spur, a four-door version of the Continental GT, was assigned to the Transparent Factory (Germany), where the Volkswagen Phaeton luxury car was also assembled. This arrangement ceased at the end of 2006 after around 1,000 cars, with all car production reverting to the Crewe plant.

Bentley presented Queen Elizabeth II with an official State Limousine in 2002 to celebrate her Golden Jubilee. Production of the two-door convertible Bentley Azure finished in 2003. It was replaced by a large luxury coupé powered by a W12 engine built in Crewe and named Bentley Continental GT.

It was confirmed in April 2005 a four-seat convertible Azure derived from the Arnage Drophead Coupé prototype would begin at Crewe in 2006. By the autumn of 2005, a convertible version of the successful Continental GT, the Continental GTC, was also presented in the autumn of 2005. These two models were launched in late 2006.

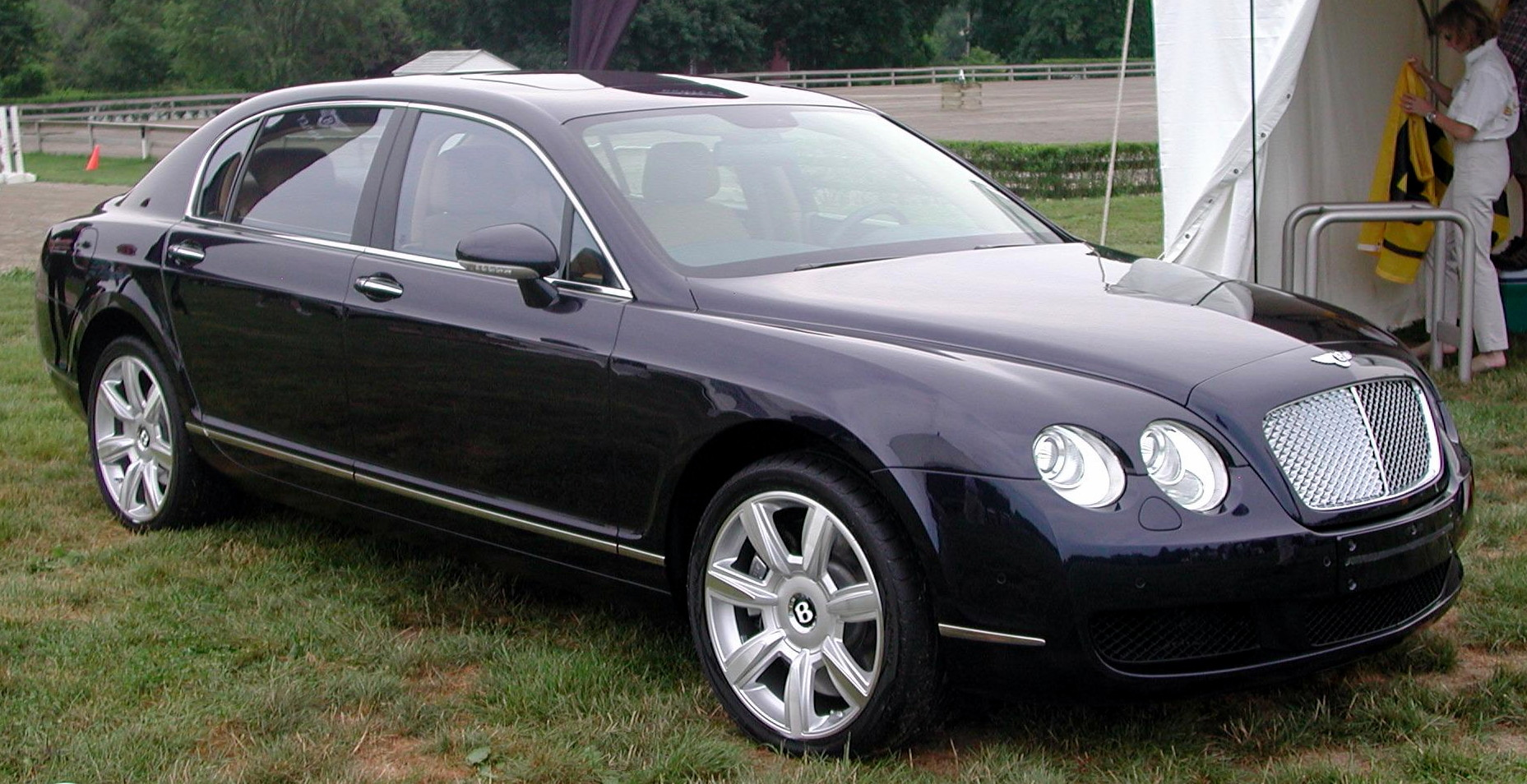
2005 Bentley Continental Flying Spur

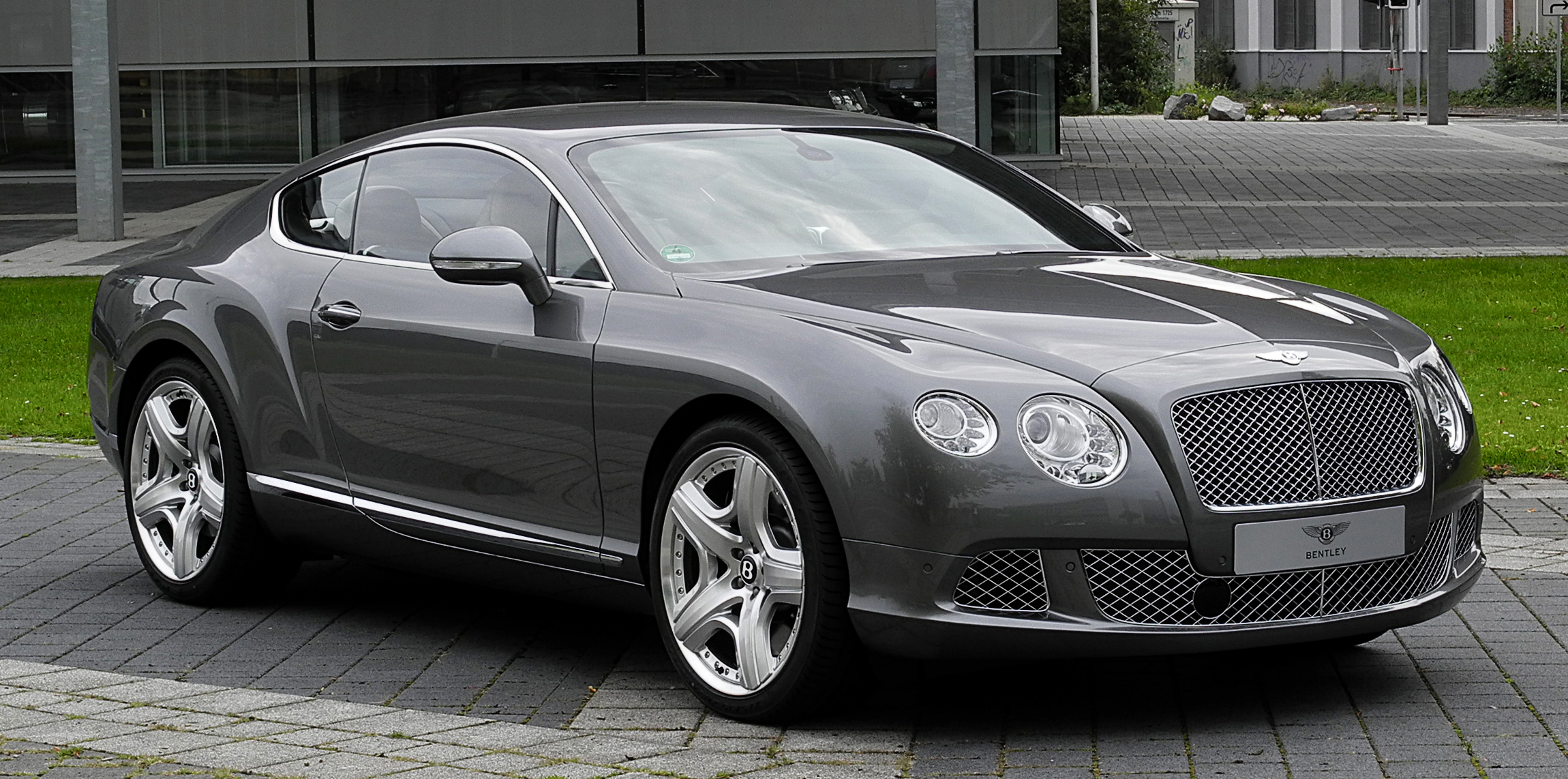
2011 Bentley Continental GT

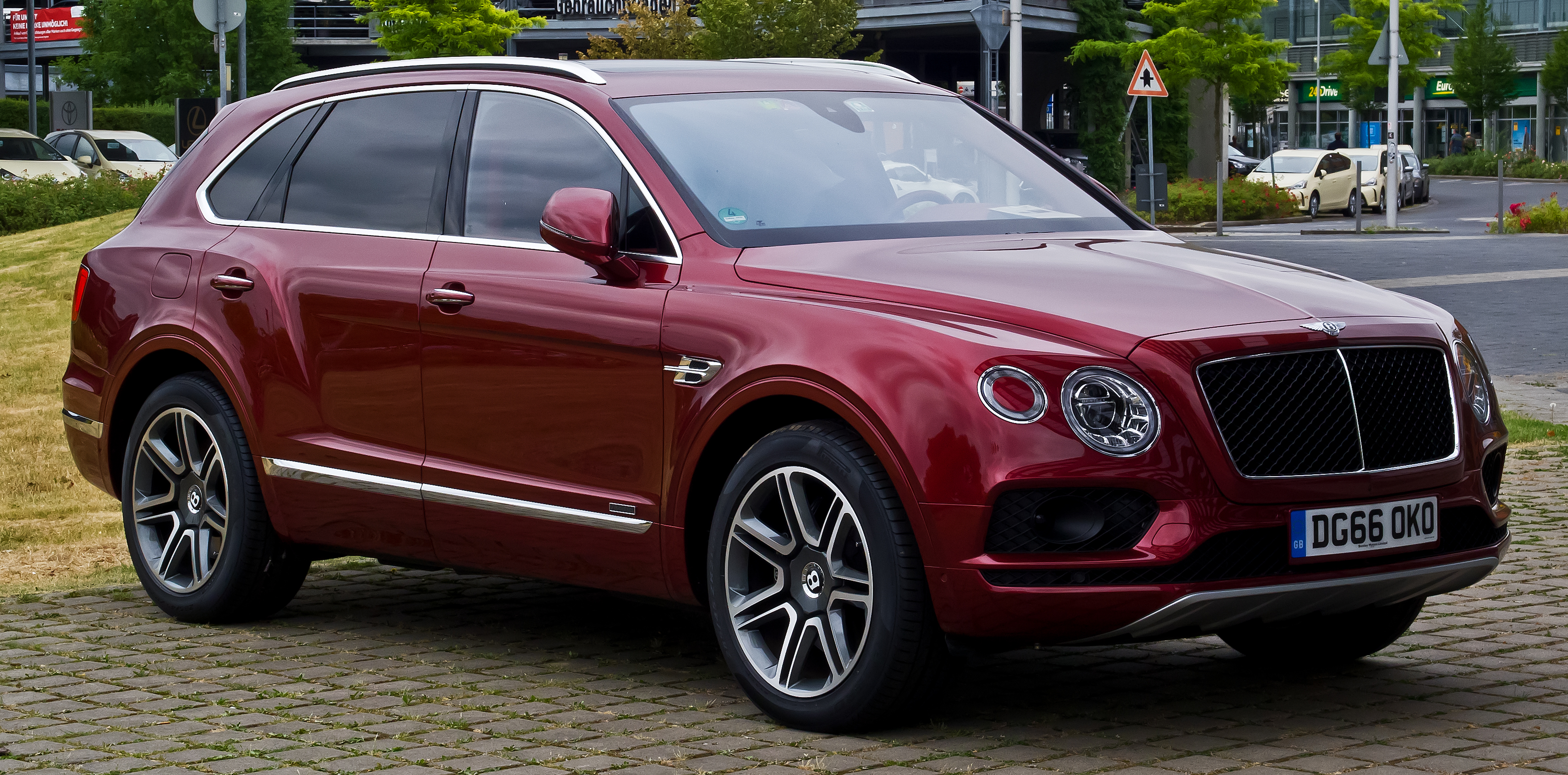
2017 Bentley Bentayga diesel

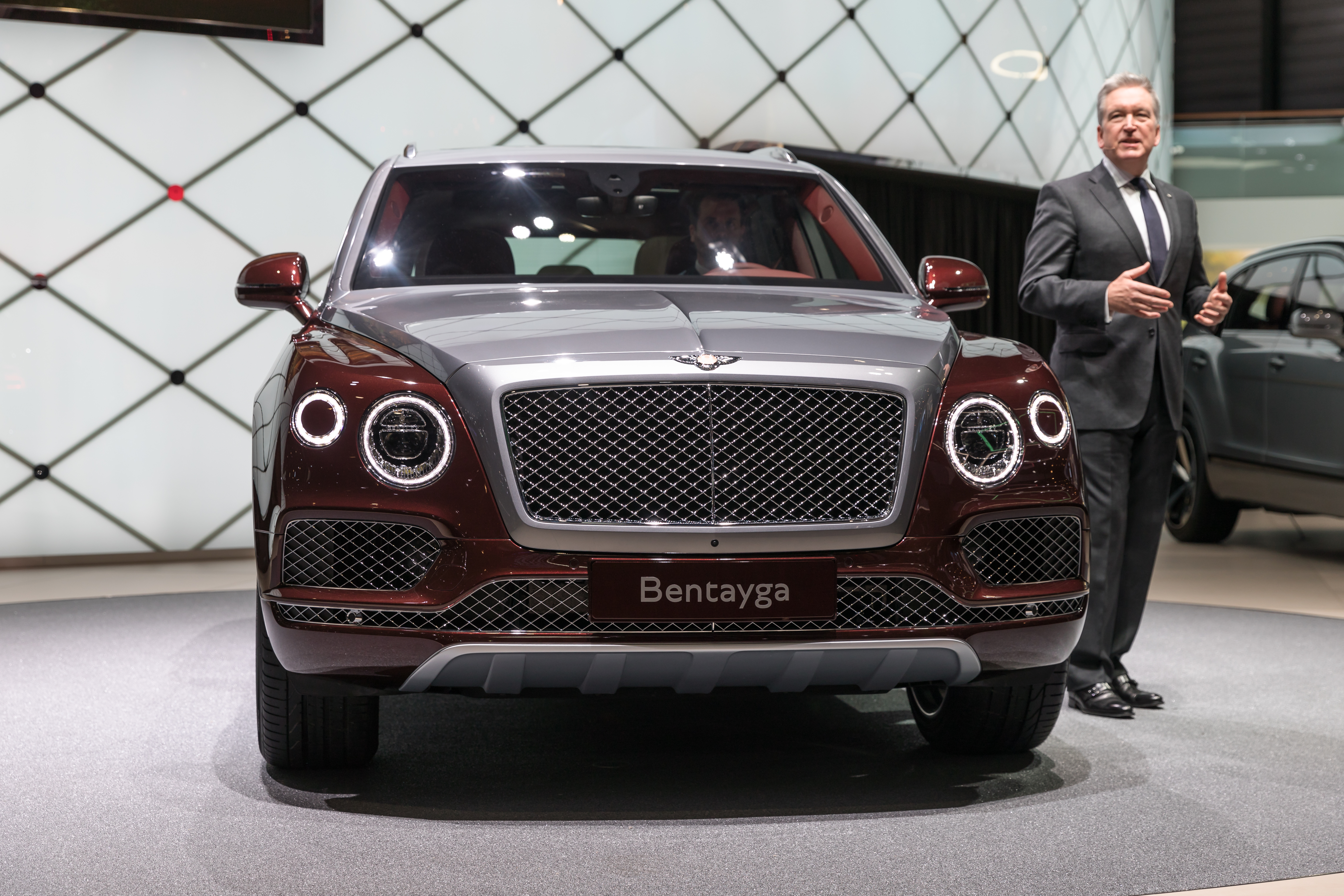
CEO Adrian Hallmark presents the Bentayga Hybrid at Geneva International Motor Show 2018.

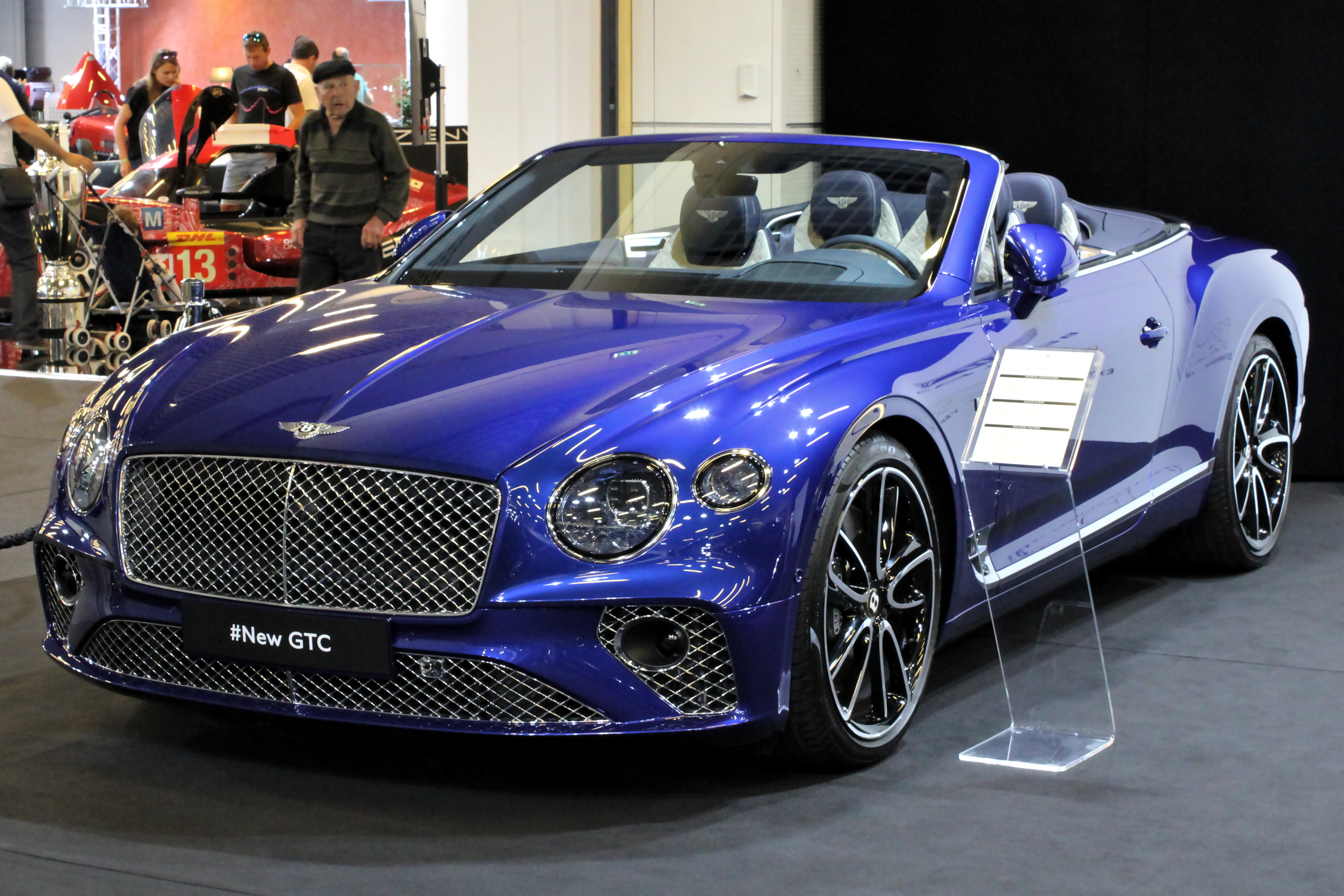
2019 Bentley Continental GTC

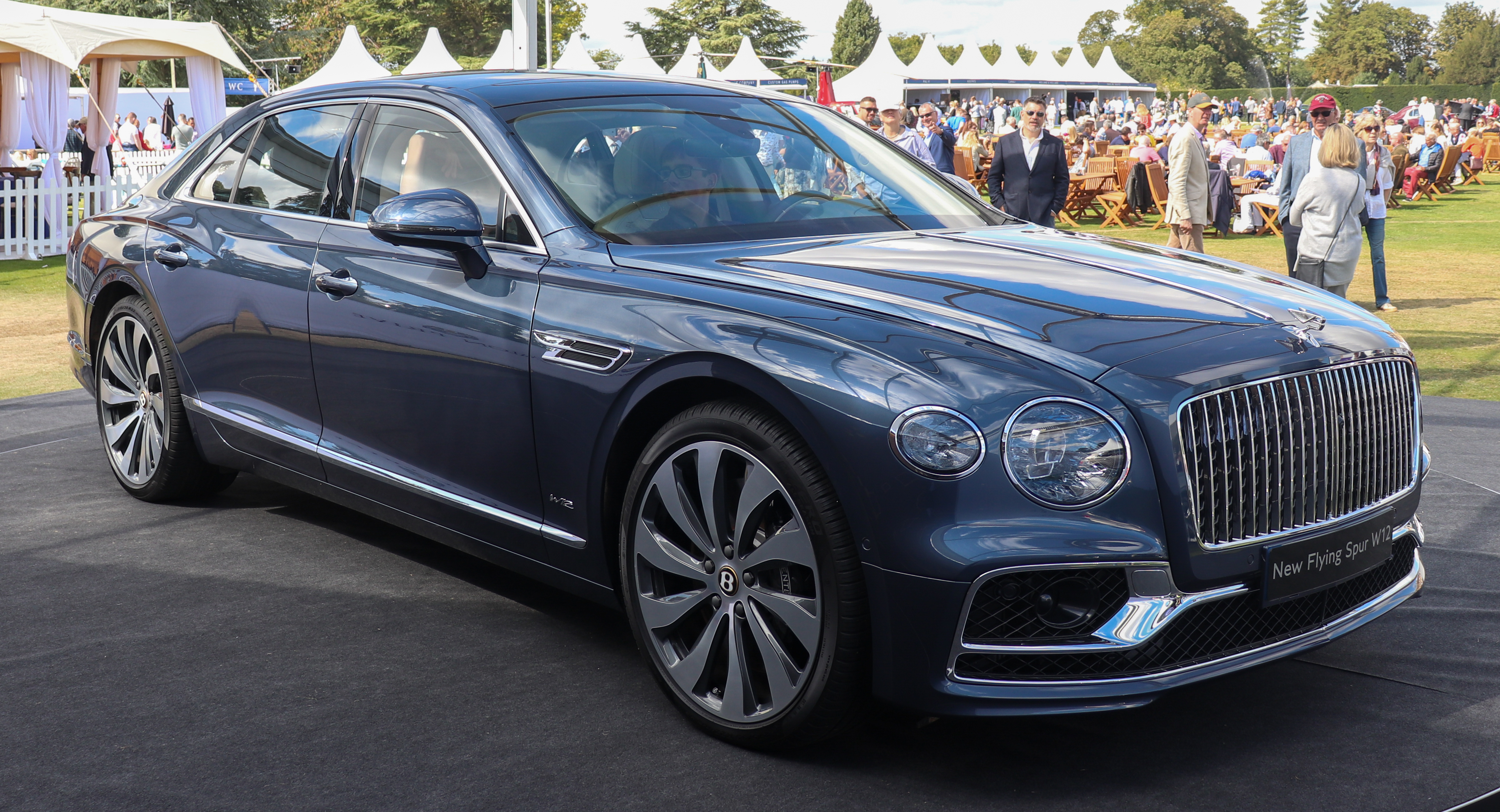
2019 Flying Spur W12

A limited run of a Zagato modified GT was also announced in March 2008, dubbed "GTZ".

A new version of the Bentley Continental was introduced at the 2009 Geneva Motor Show: The Continental Supersports. This new Bentley combines power with environmentally friendly FlexFuel technology, capable of using petrol (gasoline) and biofuel (E85 ethanol).

Bentley sales continued to increase, and in 2005 8,627 were sold worldwide, 3,654 in the United States. In 2007, the 10,000 cars-per-year threshold was broken for the first time with sales of 10,014. For 2007, a record profit of €155 million was also announced. Bentley reported a sale of about 7,600 units in 2008. However, its global sales plunged 50 percent to 4,616 vehicles in 2009 (with the U.S. deliveries dropped 49% to 1,433 vehicles) and it suffered an operating loss of €194 million, compared with an operating profit of €10 million in 2008. As a result of the slump in sales, production at Crewe was shut down during March and April 2009. Though vehicle sales increased by 11% to 5,117 in 2010, operating loss grew by 26% to €245 million. In Autumn 2010, workers at Crewe staged a series of protests over proposal of compulsory work on Fridays and mandatory overtime during the week.

Vehicle sales in 2011 rose 37% to 7,003 vehicles, with the new Continental GT accounting for over one-third of total sales. The current workforce is about 4,000 people.

The business earned a profit in 2011 after two years of losses as a result of the following sales results:

On 23 March 2020, Bentley announced to halt production due to COVID-19 pandemic. In June 2020, Bentley announced that it will cut around 1,000 (one quarter of 4,200) job places in the UK as a result of the COVID-19 pandemic.

On 3 November 2020, Bentley announced that all new cars sold will be electric by 2030. This announcement also follows after the United Kingdom Prime Minister Boris Johnson announced in February 2020 that he approved legislation that will ban and phase out non-electric vehicles (including Hybrid and Plug-in Hybrid vehicles) from the UK by 2030 with hybrids being banned by 2035.

In March 2026, as Bentley continued to invest in electric vehicle production, it announced "an organisational adjustment potentially impacting approximately 275 positions" at its Crewe plant while also reporting an operating profit of £186m on revenue of £2.25bn.

==== Deliveries, profits and staff ====
Year	Profit or loss € million	Staff	Total deliveries	Americas	China	Europe exc UK	UK	Middle East	Asia Pacific	Japan	Other
1998		1500	414								
1999			1001								
2000			1469								
2001			1429								
2002			1157		36						
2003			1017								
2004			7411								
2005			8627	3654	500						4473
2006	+137		9387	4035	175	2024					3153
2007	+155		10014	4196	338	2166	2079				1235
2008	+10		7605								
2009	−194	3500	4616	1433	489		897				1797
2010	−245		5117	1525	910	776	982				924
2011	8	4000	7003	2021	1839	1187	1031	566	249		110
2012	100		8510	2457	2253	1333	1104	815	358	190	
2013	176		10120	3140	2191	1480	1381	1185	452	291	

Sources Volkswagen AG Annual Reports and press releases

Bentley recorded a 31% rise in global sales in FY21 despite shutdowns caused by the global coronavirus pandemic.

==== Production ====
Year	Bentayga	CGT Coupé	CGT Cabrio	Flying Spur	Mulsanne	Arnage	Brooklands	Azure	Continental	Other Bentley	Rolls-Royce	Total
2000						1243		131	93	2	469	1938
2001						1049		205	114	61	352	1781
2002						883		69	50	61	147	1210
2003		107				607		62	16			792
2004		6896				790						7686
2005		4733		4271		556						9560
2006		3611	1742	4042		464		177				10036
2007		2140	4847	2270		357	8	350				9972
2008		2699	2408	1813		277	312	165				7674
2009		1211	722	1358		147	106	93				3637
2010		1735	843	1914	354		6	2				4854
2011		3416	677	2354	1146							7593
2012		3536	2638	1764	1169							9107
2013		3602	2197	3960	1117							10876
2014		3442	2151	4556	884							11033
2015	96	3997	2216	3660	919							10888
2016	5586	2272	1600	1731	628							11817
2017	4849	1345	1468	2295	595							10552
2018	4072	2841	28	1627	547							9115
2019	5232	3903	2760	102	443							12440
2020	3946	1905	1244	3381	127							10603

Sources Volkswagen AG Annual Reports

=== List of CEOs ===
- Current: Frank Steffan Walliser (since June 2024)

=== Previous CEOs ===
- Tony Gott (1998–2002)
- Franz-Josef Paefgen (2002–2011)
- Wolfgang Dürheimer (2011–2012 and 2014–2017)
- Wolfgang Schreiber (2012–2014)
- Adrian Hallmark (2018–2024)

== List of Bentley vehicles ==
Model Name	Introduced	Discontinued	Class
3 Litre	1921	1929	Sports car
3.5 Litre	1933	1939	Luxury car
4 Litre	1931	1931	Luxury car
4 1/2 Litre	1927	1931	Sports car
Speed Six	1926	1930	"Rolling chassis"
8 Litre	1930	1932	Luxury car
Arnage	1998	2009	Luxury car
Azure	1995	2009	Grand tourer
Bentayga	2015		Luxury SUV
Brooklands	1992	2011	Luxury car Grand tourer
Continental	1952		
Continental GT	2003		Grand tourer
Eight	1984	1992	Luxury car
Flying Spur	2005		Luxury car Ultra-luxury car
Mark V	1939	1941	Luxury car
Mark VI	1946	1952	Luxury car
Mulsanne	1980	1992	Luxury car
Mulsanne	2010	2020	Luxury car
R Type	1952	1955	Luxury car
S1	1955	1959	Luxury car
S2	1959	1962	
S3	1962	1965	Luxury car
State Limousine	2002	2002	Luxury car Limousine Official state car
T-Series	1965	1980	Luxury car
Turbo R	1985	1999	

== Crewe Volkswagen Bentleys ==
=== Car models in current production ===
- 2016–present: Bentayga
- 2024–present: Continental GT (Gen 4)
- 2019–present: Flying Spur (Gen 3)
- Upcoming: Torcal

=== Car models formerly in production ===
- 1998–2009: Arnage
- 2003–2011: Continental GT
- 2005–2013: Continental Flying Spur (Gen 1)
- 2006–2009: Azure (Gen 2)
- 2008–2011: Bentley Brooklands (Gen 2)
- 2010–2020: Mulsanne
- 2011–2018: Continental GT (Gen 2)
- 2013–2019: Flying Spur (Gen 2)
- 2018–2024: Continental GT (Gen 3)

=== Special edition car models ===
- 1999: Hunaudières Concept
- 2002: State Limousine

== Motorsport ==
From 2001 to 2003 Bentley entered the 24 Hours of Le Mans, winning the LMGTP class on every occasion with the Bentley Speed 8, in 2003 it also participated in the 12 Hours of Sebring, also winning the race in the LMGTP class. A Bentley Continental GT3 entered by the M-Sport factory team won the Silverstone round of the 2014 Blancpain Endurance Series. This was Bentley's first official entry in a British race since the 1930 RAC Tourist Trophy.

== Logo history ==
Logo 1919 until 1931

Logo until 2025

Logo from 2025

== See also ==
- List of car manufacturers of the United Kingdom

== Bibliography ==
- Feast, Richard (2003). Kidnap of the Flying Lady: How Germany Captured Both Rolls-Royce and Bentley. Motorbooks. ISBN 0-7603-1686-4.
- Frankel, Andrew (2005). Bentley: The Story. Redwood Publishing. ISBN 0-9517751-9-7.
- Parissien, Steven (2013). The Life of the Automobile: A New History of the Motor Car (Hardback). London: Atlantic Books. ISBN 978-1-8488-7705-4.
- Stiefel, Barry L.; Clark, Jennifer (6 December 2019). The Routledge Companion to Automobile Heritage, Culture, and Preservation. Taylor & Francis. ISBN 9780429753428. - Total pages: 406
