= Le Train Bleu =

French luxury night express train

The Calais-Mediterranée Express was a French luxury night express train which operated from 1886 to 2003. It gained international fame as the preferred train of wealthy and famous passengers between Calais and the French Riviera during the interwar period. It was colloquially referred to as Le Train Bleu in French (which became its formal name after World War II) and the Blue Train in English because of its dark-blue sleeping cars.

== History ==
=== Calais Nice Rome Express ===
In December 1883 the Compagnie Internationale des Wagons-Lits (CIWL) created its second luxury train after the Orient Express was introduced in June of that year. Due to contracts between CIWL's competitor, the Pullman Company, and the owner of the Mont Cenis Pass Railway, the Società per le strade ferrate dell'Alta Italia, CIWL could not use the Fréjus Rail Tunnel, so CIWL was forced to use the longer route along the Mediterranean coast. The connection between Paris and Rome was introduced as Calais Nice Rome Express, but it was reduced to Calais Nice Express after only one year. In 1885 several Italian railways merged and CIWL could buy the routes formerly served by Pullman, which made it possible to use the shorter Mont Cenis Railway. The train was to be named Rome Express. In order to serve British customers, the Calais-Mediterranée Express was created in 1886, but it lasted until 1890 before the Rome Express made its first journey.

=== Calais-Méditerranée ===
The Calais-Méditerranée Express was introduced in the 1886/1887 winter timetable. In the winter of 1889/1890 the name was changed to Méditerranée Express, due to the creation of the Club train. At the southern end, the route was extended to San Remo, but the portion north of Paris was taken over by the Club Train. After the introduction of the Rome Express on 15 November 1890, the two trains were combined between Paris and Mâcon. South of Mâcon, the Rome Express continued during the night over the Mont Cenis railway and the Méditerranée Express ran through the Rhone valley to the Côte d'Azur.

Route in France

Route and Timetable 1892
| Southbound | Country | Station | km | Northbound |
|---|---|---|---|---|
Club Train
| 14:55 | United Kingdom | Holborn Viaduct | | 22:47 |
| 15:00 | United Kingdom | London Charing Cross | | 22:43 |
| 15:00 | United Kingdom | London Victoria | | 22:43 |
| 22:47 | France | Paris Nord | | 15:15 |
Méditerrannée Express
| 23:40 | France | Paris Nord | | 14:20 |
| 08:49 | France | Lyon | | 06:06 |
| 14:25 | France | Marseille | | 00:30 |
| 18:18 | France | Cannes | | 20:43 |
| 19:00 | France | Nice | | 20:00 |
| 19:37 | Monaco | Monte Carlo | | 18:52 |
| 20:14 | France | Menton | | 18:36 |
| 20:36 | Italy | Ventimiglia | | 18:14 |

After several breaches of contract by CIWL, the London Chatham & Dover Railway cancelled the contract, and it lasted until 1926 before a new integrated boattrain service was created as Golden Arrow. The Méditerranée Express' northern terminus was Calais again. The service was suspended at the beginning of the First World War.

=== Train Bleu ===
The train bleu ("blue train") service resumed on 16 November 1920 between Paris and Menton with pre-war carriages, operated by the Compagnie Internationale des Wagons-Lits using the Chemins de fer de Paris à Lyon et à la Méditerranée (PLM). The whole route was served again on 9 December 1922. The new Calais-Méditerranée Express was composed of exclusively first-class, new steel carriages (S-cars) built by Leeds Forge Company in England and the CIWL-works in Munich, along with a dining car renowned for its haute cuisine five-course dinners. The "introduction ride" was made by two trains with many invitees and nearly 50 journalists, departing from Calais and Paris bound for Nice. The sleeping cars were painted blue with gold trim. This eventually led to the nickname Blue Train in 1923. This name was taken over soon in English advertisements: "Summer on the French Riviera by the Blue Train".

The height of the season for le train bleu was between November and April, when many travellers escaped the British winter to spend time on the French Riviera. Its terminus was at the Gare Maritime in Calais, where it picked up British passengers from the ferries across the English Channel. It departed at 1:00 in the afternoon and stopped at the Gare du Nord in Paris, then travelled around Paris by the Chemin de fer de Petite Ceinture to the Gare de Lyon, where it picked up additional passengers and coaches. It departed Paris early in the evening, and made stops at Dijon, Châlons, and Lyon, before reaching Marseille early the next morning. It then made further stops at all the major resort towns of the French Riviera, or Côte d'Azur: Saint-Raphaël, Juan-les-Pins, Antibes, Cannes, Nice, Monte-Carlo, before reaching its final destination, Menton, near the Italian border. The sleeping cars had only ten sleeping compartments each, with one attendant assigned to each sleeping car. Early passengers included the Prince of Wales (later King Edward VIII), Charlie Chaplin, designer Coco Chanel, Winston Churchill and writers F. Scott Fitzgerald, Evelyn Waugh and Somerset Maugham.

The Great Depression and the devaluation of the Pound Sterling greatly reduced the number of wealthy British and American travellers going to the Riviera, reducing the two trains to two carriages conveyed with the Golden Arrow between Calais and Paris. After a one and half hour stop the two luxury cars were conveyed further south by the Côte d'Azur Pullman Express. In 1936, the new Popular Front Government in France introduced the paid two-week vacation for French workers. Second-class and third-class sleeping cars were added to the Blue Train to carry middle and working class French people on holiday to the South of France. In 1938, the Popular Front government nationalized the private railway companies in France, including PLM. After 1938, le train bleu was run by the new French national railway company SNCF as an ordinary night express train.

=== 1949–1978 ===
Service was interrupted during the Second World War but resumed in 1949, when the train officially took the name Le Train Bleu. Scheduled airline service began between Paris and Nice in 1945, which took away much of the wealthy clientele. In 1962 the rolling stock was replaced by MU coaches and second class coaches were introduced in the Blue Train. In 1971 the CIWL sold its rolling stock to the national railway companies that operated the trains further on. After 1978, the train added cars with couchettes to attract more middle-class passengers.

=== The end ===
Beginning in the 1980s the night express trains were gradually replaced by the high-speed TGV trains, which cut the length of the journey from Paris to Nice from 20 hours to five, and this effectively ended the era of luxury night trains to the French Riviera. After a long history, Le Train Bleu ceased to exist under that name in September 2003, when SNCF rebranded all of its principal overnight trains as Service Nuit.

The train coaches remained in use until 9 December 2007, by which time the train had lost its dining car and most of its sleeping cars. An overnight train between Paris and Nice continued to run under SNCF's Intercités de Nuit brand, only carrying couchette and reclining seat accommodation and not luxury sleeping cars, but this was discontinued from 9 December 2017 due to withdrawal of funding from the French Government.

However, a Paris-Nice night train has been scheduled to restart on 29 March 2021. As of July 2023, there is a night train to and from Paris Austerlitz to Nice which follows much of the route of Le Train Bleu.

== In art, literature and popular culture ==
In 1924, le train bleu inspired a ballet of the same name, created by Serge Diaghilev and the Ballets Russes, with music by Darius Milhaud, a story by Jean Cocteau, choreography by Bronislava Nijinska, stage design by Henri Laurens, costumes by Coco Chanel and a curtain painted by a 1922 work of Pablo Picasso.

The train was featured in two Hercule Poirot mystery novels by Agatha Christie, The Mystery of the Blue Train (1928), and Three Act Tragedy (1934); the novel The Colossus of Arcadia (1938) by E. Phillips Oppenheim; and the novel Mon ami Maigret (1949) by Georges Simenon.

The Blue Train Races were a series of record-breaking attempts between automobiles and trains in the late 1920s and early 1930s. It saw a number of motorists and their own, or sponsored, automobiles race against "le train bleu". The Blue Train Bentleys, two Bentley Speed Six automobiles owned by "Bentley Boy" Woolf Barnato, were involved in the Blue Train Races.

Philip Marlowe comes around after being knocked unconscious to see a poster advertising "See the French Riviera by The Blue Train" in Raymond Chandler's novel "The Lady in the Lake" (1943).

In 1963, the belle-epoque restaurant at the Gare de Lyon train station in Paris was renamed Le Train Bleu to honor the historic train.

A French television series, Le train bleu s'arrete 13 fois (lit. "The Blue Train Stops 13 times"), appeared on the French channel ORTF between October 8, 1965, and March 11, 1966. It featured one mystery episode for each of the thirteen stops of the Train Bleu between Paris and Menton, based on short stories by Pierre Boileau and Thomas Narcejac.

Bloomingdale's flagship store in New York City operated a restaurant named Le Train Bleu from 1979 to 2016. Named after the legendary train, its interior was a wider version of what the dining car on the original train might have looked like.

The Blue Train is mentioned in the 2022 movie "Downton Abbey: A New Era" (set in 1928) carrying the Grantham family through France to the French Riviera and back. It is also mentioned in the closing scene of the BBC's 2025 version of Agatha Christie's, "Towards Zero".

== See also ==
- List of named passenger trains
