= 1926 in literature =

This article contains information about the literary events and publications of 1926.

== Events ==
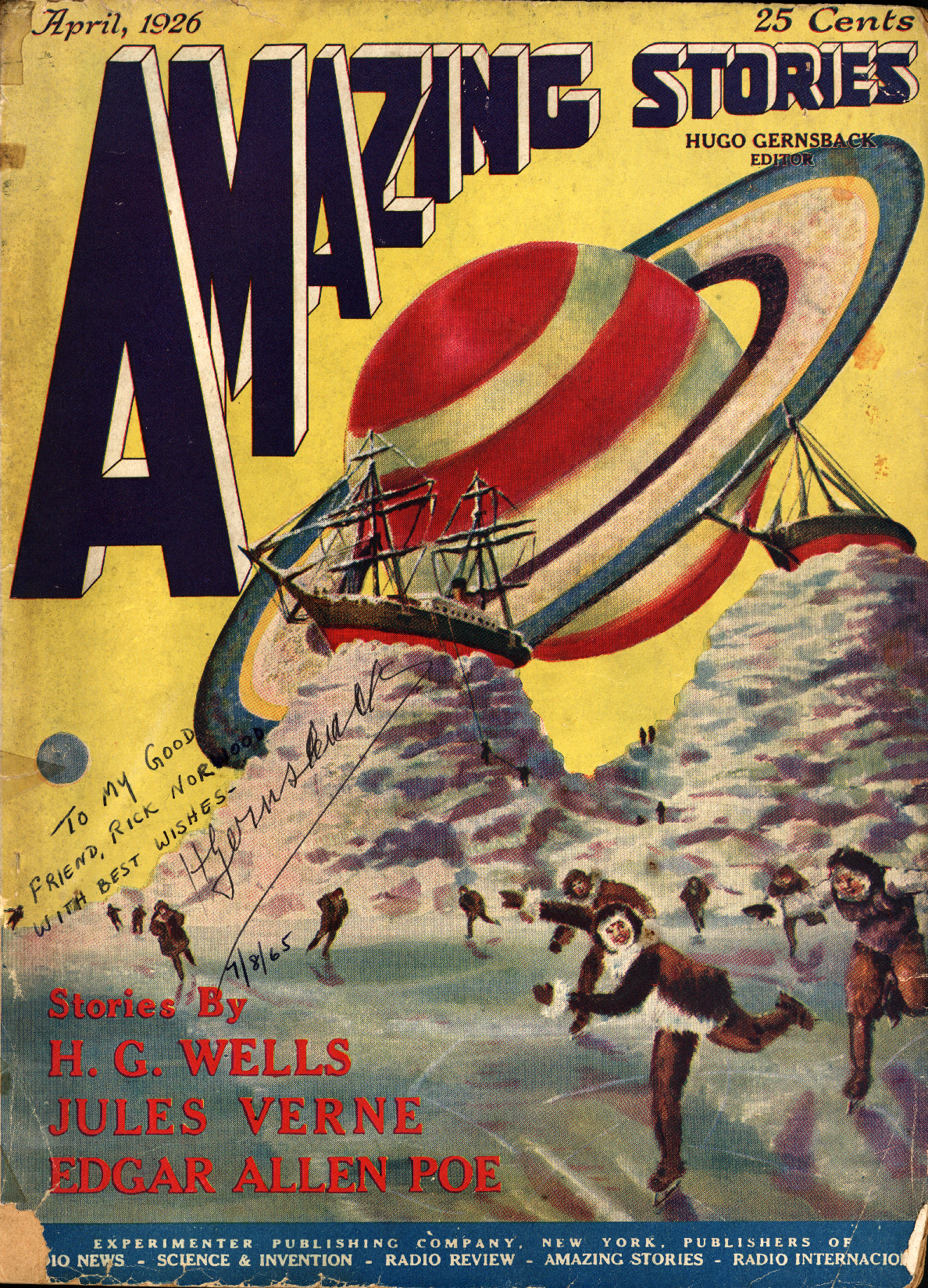
First issue of Amazing Stories, art by Frank R. Paul. This copy was autographed by Hugo Gernsback in 1965.

- February 8 – Seán O'Casey's play The Plough and the Stars opens at the Abbey Theatre, Dublin. At the February 11 performance there is a near-riot: one audience member strikes an actress.
- February 12 – The Irish Free State Minister for Justice, Kevin O'Higgins, appoints a Committee on Evil Literature.
- February 26 – The future English novelist Graham Greene is received into the Catholic Church.
- April 1 – Hugo Gernsback launches his pioneering science fiction magazine Amazing Stories in the United States.
- May 11 – C. S. Lewis and J. R. R. Tolkien first meet in Oxford.
- October 10 – Mikhail Bulgakov's novel The White Guard (Белая гвардия), partly serialized in Rossiya before the magazine's suppression earlier in the year, opens as a dramatic adaptation, The Days of the Turbins, at the Moscow Art Theatre. It is enjoyed by Stalin.
- October 14 – The children's book Winnie-the-Pooh by A. A. Milne first appears, published by Methuen in London.
- November – George Bernard Shaw initially declines the 1925 Nobel Prize in Literature (which is awarded a year later) stating "I can forgive Nobel for inventing dynamite, but only a fiend in human form could have invented the Nobel prize". He later changes his mind and accepts the honour, but refuses to receive the prize money. Shaw recommends that the prize money instead be used to fund the translation of works by Swedish playwright August Strindberg to English.
- December 3 – Disappearance of Agatha Christie: English detective story writer Agatha Christie disappears from her home in Surrey. On December 14 she is found at a Harrogate hotel, staying under her husband's mistress's name.
- December – Thomas Mann begins writing Die Geschichten Jaakobs in Munich, first of the tetralogy Joseph and His Brothers (Joseph und seine Brüder), on which he will work until January 1943.
- unknown dates
  - Antonin Artaud and Roger Vitrac establish the Théatre Alfred-Jarry in Paris to produce surrealist drama.
  - The Bread Loaf Writers' Conference is founded in Middlebury, Vermont.
  - Vsevolod Meyerhold stages an expressionistic production of Gogol's satirical comedy The Government Inspector (Ревизор, 1836) in Moscow.
  - Margaret Mitchell begins the novel Gone with the Wind, which will appear 1936.
  - The remains of the English poet Isaac Rosenberg (killed in battle in 1918) are re-interred at Bailleul Road East Cemetery, Plot V, St. Laurent-Blangy, Pas de Calais, France.
  - Peter Llewelyn Davies establishes the London publishing house Peter Davies Ltd.

== New books ==
=== Fiction ===
- Ion Agârbiceanu – Legea trupului
- Marcel Arland – Monique
- Roberto Arlt – Mad Toy (El juguete rabioso)
- Isaac Babel – Red Cavalry («Конармия», short stories)
- Henry Bellamann – Petenera's Daughter
- Anthony Berkeley – The Wychford Poisoning Case
- Louis Bromfield – Early Autumn
- Edgar Rice Burroughs – The Moon Maid
- Willa Cather – My Mortal Enemy
- Marjorie Bowen – Mistress Nell Gwynne
- G. K. Chesterton – The Incredulity of Father Brown
- Agatha Christie – The Murder of Roger Ackroyd
- J.J. Connington
  - The Dangerfield Talisman
  - Death at Swaythling Court
- Freeman Wills Crofts – The Cheyne Mystery
- James R. Crowell and Samuel C. Hildreth – The Spell of the Turf
- Ramón del Valle-Inclán – Tirano Banderas: novela de tierra caliente (Tyrant Banderas)
- Arthur Conan Doyle – The Land of Mist
- Joseph Jefferson Farjeon – Number 17
- William Faulkner – Soldiers' Pay
- Ronald Firbank – Concerning the Eccentricities of Cardinal Pirelli
- F. Scott Fitzgerald – All the Sad Young Men
- Ford Madox Ford – A Man Could Stand Up (third book of the four-volume Parade's End)
- C. S. Forester – Payment Deferred
- Dion Fortune – The Secrets of Dr. Taverner
- Zona Gale – Preface to Life
- Hugo Gernsback – Ralph 124C 41+ (in book form)
- Ellen Glasgow – The Romantic Comedians
- Ricardo Güiraldes – Don Segundo Sombra
- H. Rider Haggard – The Treasure of the Lake
- Ernest Hemingway
  - The Sun Also Rises
  - The Torrents of Spring
- Harold Heslop – Pod vlastu uglya (Under the Sway of Coal, translation of Goaf)
- Georgette Heyer – These Old Shades
- Sydney Horler – The House of Secrets
- Mikheil Javakhishvili – The White Collar (თეთრი საყელო, Tetri sakelo)
- Franz Kafka – The Castle
- Yasunari Kawabata (川端 康成) – "The Dancing Girl of Izu" (伊豆の踊子, "Izu no odoriko", short story)
- D. H. Lawrence – The Plumed Serpent
- Monteiro Lobato – O Presidente Negro
- Marie Belloc Lowndes – What Really Happened
- Agnes Mure Mackenzie – The Quiet Lady
- Compton Mackenzie – Fairy Gold
- Hope Mirrlees – Lud-in-the-Mist
- George Moore – Ulich and Soracha
- Vladimir Nabokov (as V. Sirin) – Mary («Машенька», Mashen'ka)
- Carola Oman – King Heart
- E. Phillips Oppenheim
  - The Golden Beast
  - Prodigals of Monte Carlo
- Baroness Orczy – The Celestial City
- Cassiano Ricardo – Vamos caçar papagaios
- Grigol Robakidze – The Snake's Skin (გველის პერანგი)
- Sagitta (John Henry Mackay) – Der Puppenjunge (The Pansy; in English as The Hustler)
- Marquis de Sade (died 1814) – Dialogue Between a Priest and a Dying Man (written 1782)
- Dorothy L. Sayers – Clouds of Witness
- Arthur Schnitzler – Dream Story (Traumnovelle)
- Thorne Smith – Topper (aka The Jovial Ghosts)
- Cecil Street – Dr. Priestley's Quest
- A. H. Tammsaare – Tõde ja Õigus (Truth and Justice, begins publication)
- Sylvia Thompson – The Hounds of Spring
- B. Traven – The Death Ship (Das Totenschiff)
- S. S. Van Dine – The Benson Murder Case (the first Philo Vance mystery)
- Henry Wade – The Verdict of You All
- Edgar Wallace
  - The Avenger
  - Barbara on Her Own
  - The Northing Tramp
  - The Terrible People
  - The Yellow Snake
- Sylvia Townsend Warner – Lolly Willowes
- H. G. Wells – The World of William Clissold
- Walter F. White – Flight

=== Children and young people ===
- Angela Brazil – Joan's Best Chum
- Will James – Smoky the Cowhorse
- Zofia Kossak-Szczucka – The Troubles of a Gnome (Kłopoty Kacperka góreckiego skrzata)
- A. A. Milne – Winnie-the-Pooh
- Ruth Plumly Thompson – The Hungry Tiger of Oz (20th in the Oz series overall and the sixth written by her)

=== Drama ===
- Dorothy Brandon – Blind Alley
- Bertolt Brecht – Man Equals Man (Mann ist Mann)
- Mikhail Bulgakov – The Days of the Turbins («Дни Турбиных»)
- G. D. H. Cole – The Striker Stricken
- St. John Greer Ervine – Anthony and Anna
- J. B. Fagan – And So To Bed
- Joseph Jefferson Farjeon – After Dark
- John Galsworthy – Escape
- Patrick Hastings – Scotch Mist
- Zora Neale Hurston – Color Struck (published)
- Seán O'Casey – The Plough and the Stars
- Eden Phillpotts – Blue Comet
- Ben Travers – Rookery Nook
- Sergei Tretyakov – I Want a Baby («Хочу ребёнка»)

=== Poetry ===
- Mário de Andrade – Losango cáqui
- Langston Hughes – The Weary Blues
- Robert McAlmon – The Portrait of a Generation
- Hugh MacDiarmid – A Drunk Man Looks at the Thistle
- Dorothy Parker – Enough Rope
- Vita Sackville-West – The Land

=== Non-fiction ===
- Germán List Arzubide – El movimiento estridentista
- Benedictine Vulgate (begins publication)
- Angela Brazil – My Own Schooldays
- Arthur Conan Doyle – The History of Spiritualism
- H. Rider Haggard – The Days of My Life
- T. E. Lawrence – Seven Pillars of Wisdom
- Otto Schmidt (chief editor) – Great Soviet Encyclopedia (Большая советская энциклопедия, Bolshaya sovetskaya entsiklopediya; begins publication)
- Dan Simonescu – Încercări istorico-literare (Literary and Historical Essays)
- R. H. Tawney – Religion and the Rise of Capitalism
- Helen Thomas – As It Was
- W. B. Yeats – Autobiographies
- Paul Zarifopol – Din registrul ideilor gingașe (A Register of Tender Ideas)
- Alfred Eckhard Zimmern – The Third British Empire

== Births ==
- January 5 – W. D. Snodgrass, American poet (died 2009)
- January 12 – Shumon Miura, Japanese novelist (died 2017)
- January 13 – Michael Bond, English fiction writer and creator of Paddington Bear (died 2017)
- January 14 – Tom Tryon, American actor and novelist (died 1991)
- January 27 – Fritz Spiegl, Austrian-born musician and writer (died 2003)
- February 3 – Richard Yates, American novelist (died 1992)
- February 8 – Neal Cassady, American writer and poet (died 1968)
- February 20 – Richard Matheson, American science fiction writer (died 2013)
- March 3 – James Merrill, American poet (died 1995)
- March 7 – Chemmanam Chacko, Indian poet (died 2018)
- March 24 – Dario Fo, Italian dramatist and actor (died 2016)
- March 27 – Frank O'Hara, American poet (died 1966)
- March 31 – John Fowles, English novelist (died 2005)
- April 3 – Luís de Sttau Monteiro, Portuguese novelist and dramatist (died 1993)
- April 11 – Franz Herre, German biographer (died 2026)
- April 12 – Khozh-Akhmed Bersanov, Chechen ethnographer (died 2018)
- April 13 – Egon Wolff, Chilean dramatist (died 2016)
- April 23
  - J. P. Donleavy, Irish American novelist (died 2017)
  - Éva Janikovszky, Hungarian novelist and children's writer (died 2003)
- April 28 – Harper Lee, American novelist (died 2016)
- April 30 – Edmund Cooper, British poet and author (died 1982)
- May 15 – English twins
  - Anthony Shaffer, dramatist and screenwriter (died 2001)
  - Peter Shaffer, dramatist (died 2016)
- May 21 – Robert Creeley, American author (died 2005)
- June 3 – Allen Ginsberg, American Beat Generation poet (died 1997)
- June 4 – Ain Kaalep, Estonian poet, playwright and critic (died 2020)
- June 8 – David Cairns, British journalist
- June 13
  - Kanam EJ, Malayalam novelist and lyricist (died 1982)
  - Dalmiro Sáenz, Argentinian writer (died 2016)
- June 19 – Giangiacomo Feltrinelli, Italian publisher (died 1972)
- June 25 – Ingeborg Bachmann, Austrian poet, writer, essayist and librettist (died 1973)
- July 7 – Spencer Holst, American writer and storyteller (died 2001)
- July 11 – Frederick Buechner, American author and minister (died 2022)
- July 18 – Elizabeth Jennings, English poet (died 2001)
- August 6 – Elisabeth Beresford, English children's author (died 2010)
- August 12 – Wallace Markfield, American comic novelist (died 2002)
- August 13 – Roy Heath, Guyanese novelist (died 2008)
- August 14
  - Alice Adams, American short story writer (died 1999)
  - René Goscinny, French writer and co-creator of Astérix (died 1977)
- September 3 – Alison Lurie, American novelist and academic (died 2020)
- September 6 – Clancy Sigal, American writer (died 2017)
- September 14 – Michel Butor, French writer (died 2016)
- September 16 – John Knowles, American novelist (died 2001)
- October 2 – Jan Morris, born James Morris, Anglo-Welsh historian and travel writer (died 2020)
- October 15
  - Michel Foucault, French historian of ideas, philosopher and literary critic (died 1984)
  - Evan Hunter, American author and screenwriter (died 2005)
- October 27 – June Arnold, American novelist and publisher (died 1982)
- November 5 – John Berger, English art critic and novelist (died 2017)
- November 11
  - José Manuel Caballero, Spanish novelist and poet (died 2021)
  - Harold Perkin, English social historian (died 2004)
- November 19 – Barry Reckord, Jamaican playwright (died 2011)
- November 20 – John Gardner, English thriller writer (died 2007)
- November 25 – Poul Anderson, American science fiction writer (died 2001)
- December 23 – Robert Bly, American writer (died 2021)

== Deaths ==
- January 14
  - René Boylesve, French author (born 1867)
  - August Sedláček, Czech historian (born 1843)
- January 26 – Bucura Dumbravă, Romanian novelist and spiritualist (malaria, born 1868)
- February 1 – Ishibashi Ningetsu (石橋 忍月), Japanese author and critic (born 1865)
- February 6 – Wolf Wilhelm Friedrich von Baudissin, German theologian (born 1847)
- February 12 – Radu Rosetti, Romanian politician, historical novelist and memoirist (born 1853)
- March 3 – Sir Sidney Lee, English biographer (born 1859)
- May 9 – J. M. Dent, English publisher (born 1849)
- May 21 – Ronald Firbank, English novelist (born 1886)
- May 23 – Sigrid Elmblad, Swedish author and translator (born 1860)
- May 26 – Srečko Kosovel, Slovenian Expressionist poet (meningitis, born 1904)
- June 27 – Addie C. Strong Engle, American author and publisher (born 1845)
- July 8 – Karel Václav Rais, Czech realist novelist (born 1859)
- July 11 – Fran Detela, Slovenian academic and writer (born 1850)
- July 14 – Elisabeth Cavazza, American author, journalist, and music critic (born 1849)
- July 19 – Ada Cambridge, English/Australian writer and poet (born 1844)
- July 22 – John Burland Harris-Burland, British writer (born 1870)
- August 1 – Israel Zangwill, English poet (born 1864)
- October 5 – Javier de Viana, Uruguayan writer (born 1868)
- October 9 – Helena Nyblom, Danish-born poet and writer of fairy tales (born 1843)
- October 11 – Albert Robida, French illustrator and novelist (born 1848)
- November 10 – Lyubov Dostoyevskaya, Russian memoirist (born 1869)
- December 8 – Sarah Doudney, English novelist, children's writer and hymnist (born 1841)
- December 12 – Jean Richepin, French poet, dramatist and novelist (born 1849)
- December 29 – Rainer Maria Rilke, German poet (born 1875)
- unknown date
  - Emma Whitcomb Babcock, American litterateur and author (born 1849)
  - Susanne Vandegrift Moore, American editor and publisher (born 1848)

== Awards ==
- James Tait Black Memorial Prize for fiction: Radclyffe Hall, Adam's Breed
- James Tait Black Memorial Prize for biography: Herbert Brook Workman, John Wyclif: A Study of the English Medieval Church
- Newbery Medal for children's literature: Arthur Bowie Chrisman, Shen of the Sea
- Nobel Prize for Literature: Grazia Deledda
- Pulitzer Prize for Drama: George Kelly, Craig's Wife
- Pulitzer Prize for Poetry: Amy Lowell, What's O'Clock
- Pulitzer Prize for the Novel: Sinclair Lewis, Arrowsmith
- Blindman International Poetry Prize: Ruth Manning-Sanders, The City
