= The Outsider (1931 film) =

1931 film

- Directed by: Harry Lachman
- Written by: Harry Lachman; Alma Reville
- Based on: The Outsider by Dorothy Brandon
- Produced by: Eric Hakim
- Starring: Joan Barry; Harold Huth; Norman McKinnel
- Cinematography: Günther Krampf
- Edited by: Winifred Cooper; Geza Pollatschik
- Music by: W. L. Trytel
- Production companies: Eric Hakim Productions; British International Pictures
- Distributed by: Metro-Goldwyn-Mayer
- Release date: 20 April 1931
- Running time: 93 minutes
- Country: United Kingdom
- Language: English

The Outsider is a 1931 British drama film directed by Harry Lachman and starring Joan Barry, Harold Huth and Norman McKinnel. It was written by Lachman and Alma Reville, based on the 1923 play of the same title by Dorothy Brandon, previously made into an American silent film in 1926. It was made at Elstree Studios with sets designed by Wilfred Arnold. The film was remade in 1939 as The Outsider with George Sanders and Mary Maguire in the leading roles.

The screenplay concerns an unorthodox osteopath who cures one of his patients, the daughter of a fellow doctor.

== Plot ==
Lalage Sturdee, the beautiful young daughter of famous surgeon Joseph Sturdee, is left crippled after treatment by an unqualified bone-setter. She is cured by osteopath Anton Ragatzy, with whom she subsequently falls in love.

== Cast ==
- Joan Barry as Lalage Sturdee
- Harold Huth as Anton Ragatzy
- Norman McKinnel as Jasper Sturdee
- Frank Lawton as Basil Owen
- Mary Clare as Mrs. Coates
- Glenore Pointing as Carol
- Annie Esmond as Pritchard
- Sidney J. Gillett as Dr. Ladd
- Randolph McLeod as Sir Nathan Israel
- Fewlass Llewellyn as Sir Montague Tollemach

== Reception ==
Film Weekly voted Harold Huth's performance the best in a British film in 1931. In its review the paper wrote: "Here's a British film that is a really efficient and entertaining piece of work. It blends a dramatic and unusual story with some really good acting and it does command one's interest. It has faults which lie in the direction of too much speech and an inclination to bombastic melodrama in the dialogue. There is, too, a terribly stagy performance by Norman McKinnel; but, these considerations apart, the film is distinctly one worth seeing."

Kine Weekly wrote: "Medical romantic melodrama presenting a vital tender portrait of faith's inestimable part in the correction of physical infirmity. Its hypothesis is presented in an effective if theatrical frame. The qualified and unqualified do battle and the contest is so arranged as establish compelling emotional conclusions. Character drawing is outstanding, direction sensitive a technical presentation excellent."
