= The Outsider (1926 film) =

1926 film

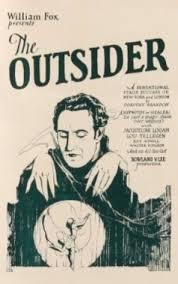
- Directed by: Rowland V. Lee
- Written by: Robert N. Lee (adaptation)
- Based on: The Outsider by Dorothy Brandon
- Produced by: William Fox
- Starring: Jacqueline Logan; Lou Tellegen; Walter Pidgeon
- Cinematography: G.O. Post
- Distributed by: Fox Film Corporation
- Release date: January 17, 1926
- Running time: 60 minutes; 6 reels
- Country: United States
- Language: Silent (English intertitles)

The Outsider is a lost 1926 American 60-minute silent drama film directed by Rowland V. Lee and starring Jacqueline Logan, Lou Tellegen, and Walter Pidgeon. It was based on the 1923 play The Outsider by Dorothy Brandon. The screenplay is set in London and concerns an unorthodox doctor who cures a patient with whom he is in love.

The film was remade as a British sound film in 1931, which was released by Metro Goldwyn Mayer.

== Plot ==
As described in a film magazine review, Leontine Sturdee and her dancing partner Basil Owen tour Hungry. They meet Anton Ragatzy, a mystic faith healer who falls in love with the young woman. When she is injured during an acrobatic dance move, she is taken to London where the doctors pronounce her an incurable cripple. Anton follows her to London where he offers her aid but is denounced by the doctors. Finally he obtains admission to see Leontine. After several failures she is able to rise and walk at his command. Leontine realizes that it was not his healing abilities but their mutual love that wrought the cure.

== Cast ==
- Jacqueline Logan as Leontine Sturdee
- Lou Tellegen as Anton Ragatzy
- Walter Pidgeon as Basil Owen
- Roy Atwell as Jerry Sidon
- Charles Willis Lane as Sir Jasper Sturdee
- Joan Standing as Pritchard
- Gibson Gowland as Shadow
- Bertram Marburgh as Dr. Talley
- Crauford Kent as Dr. Ladd
- Louis Payne as Dr. Helmore

== See also ==
- 1937 Fox vault fire

== Preservation ==
With no prints of The Outsider located in any film archives, it is a lost film.
