= Blind Alley (disambiguation) =

"Blind Alley" is the title of a science fiction short story by Isaac Asimov. It may also refer to:

- Blind Alley (play), a 1926 play by the British writer Dorothy Brandon
- Blind Alley (film), a 1939 film starring Chester Morris
- Blind Alleys, a 1985 television special
- "Blind Alley", a song by The Emotions which was sampled by several rappers including Biggie Smalls and Daddy Kane, and also formed the basis of Mariah Carey's hit "Dreamlover"
- "Blind Alley", a 1972 song by the all-female American pop/rock group Fanny
- "Blind Alley", a science fiction novella by Malcolm Jameson, later made into a Twilight Zone episode
- The Blind Alley, a 2013 album from the Austin, TX band Exit

A blind alley (also cul-de-sac or no through road) is a street open at only one end.
