= Wild Heather =

1921 film

- Directed by: Cecil Hepworth
- Written by: George Dewhurst
- Based on: Wild Heather by Dorothy Brandon
- Starring: Chrissie White; Gerald Ames; James Carew; George Dewhurst
- Production company: Hepworth Picture Plays
- Release date: 1921
- Country: United Kingdom
- Language: English

Wild Heather is a 1921 British drama film directed by Cecil Hepworth and starring Chrissie White, Gerald Ames, James Carew and George Dewhurst. It was based on the 1917 play Wild Heather by Dorothy Brandon.

== Plot ==
A senator - who is dying - marries a woman reporter, in order to make her the guardian of his three sons.

== Cast ==
- Chrissie White as "Wild Heather" Boyd
- G. H. Mulcaster as John O'Rourke
- Gwynne Herbert as Mrs. Boyd
- James Carew as Senator O'Rourke
- Gerald Ames as Bevan Hutchinson
- George Dewhurst as George O'Rourke
- Hugh Clifton as Edward O'Rourke
- James Annand as Professor Boyd
- Eileen Dennes as Dolly
- Marion Dyer as Trixie
