= Wild Heather (play) =

1917 play

- Original language: English
- Written by: Dorothy Brandon
- Genre: Drama

Premiere
- Date: 27 August 1917
- Place: Gaiety Theatre, Manchester; Strand Theatre, London (West End)

Wild Heather is a 1917 play by the British writer Dorothy Brandon. A woman looking to marry has to choose between two very different men.

After debuting at the Gaiety Theatre in Manchester in August 1917, it transferred for a West End run at the Strand Theatre lasting 79 performances between October 1917 and January 1918. The cast included Lyn Harding and Helen Haye. Noël Coward had one of his earliest roles in the production.

== Film adaptation ==
In 1921, it was turned into a silent film Wild Heather directed by Cecil Hepworth.
