= Disappearance of Agatha Christie =

1926 11-day disappearance of Agatha Christie

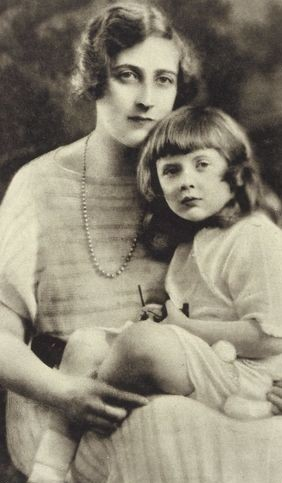
Agatha Christie with her daughter Rosalind Hicks. One of the many photographs of her published in December 1926

The disappearance of Agatha Christie was the widely publicised eleven-day absence of the English writer Agatha Christie in December 1926. At the end of 1914, she married the Royal Flying Corps officer Archibald Christie, with whom she had her only child, a daughter, Rosalind Hicks. In 1916, the aspiring writer finished her first detective novel, The Mysterious Affair at Styles, and by the mid-1920s, had established herself as a recognised author of detective and thriller fiction, with her fame and royalties steadily growing. At the start of 1926, at her husband's insistence, the Christies bought a mansion in Sunningdale called "Styles". During this period Archie began an affair with an office typist, Nancy Neele, and in August 1926 he told his wife that he had fallen in love with someone else. The couple spent several months trying to repair their marriage unsuccessfully.

On 3 December 1926, during a particularly serious quarrel at their home, Archie declared that he saw no possibility of saving the marriage and would seek a divorce, after which he left for work in the City of London. That same evening Agatha disappeared from Styles without a trace. The following morning, in the county of Surrey, on a hill near the town of Newlands Corner, her car was found with its headlights on, standing at the edge of a quarry. Christie's disappearance caused enormous public interest, both at home and abroad, and a wide range of theories were put forward. Many suspected her husband of being involved, or assumed that the writer had staged her own disappearance for publicity. There were also theories involving foul play or death, including suicide. Several hundred police officers took part in the search for Christie, along with up to fifteen thousand civilian volunteers, according to the press's highest estimates.

On 14 December the writer was finally found. It turned out that Christie had registered under the surname of her husband's mistress — Teresa Neele — at the fashionable Swan Hydropathic Hotel in Harrogate, North Yorkshire. There she had behaved in a rather modest and withdrawn manner. On Sunday 12 December, the police were informed that a woman resembling the missing writer had been seen at the hotel. Her husband was summoned and identified her. Agatha offered no explanation for her disappearance, citing amnesia. On 15 December, the couple, under the attention of journalists and onlookers, left the hotel and travelled by train to Cheadle, to the estate "Abney Hall", where the writer's sister Madge lived with her husband. There Agatha was examined by two doctors, who concluded that she was suffering from memory loss. Their conclusion became the basis of the "official" version maintained by the family for many years. In 1928, the Christies' marriage was dissolved, but Agatha chose to keep her husband's surname, under which she had become known as a writer. The need to support her family strengthened her resolve to become a professional author. She went on to become a leading figure in the detective genre, the most translated author and one of the best-selling writers in history. In 1930, she met the archaeologist Max Mallowan, to whom she was married for the rest of her life.

Agatha avoided returning to the events of December 1926 and shied away from discussing them publicly. Her detailed Autobiography says nothing about these facts; the author confines herself to a general remark about her separation from her husband. Members of her family and close friends tried to follow this same policy for decades, explaining what had happened as the result of their famous relative's loss of memory. It is believed that the circumstances of Christie's disappearance are reflected in a number of her works, both detective novels and works of a more melodramatic character. The issues connected with these events have been examined in numerous biographical books, articles and documentary films. In addition, the writer's disappearance has inspired literary works as well as feature and television films.

== History ==
=== Previous events ===
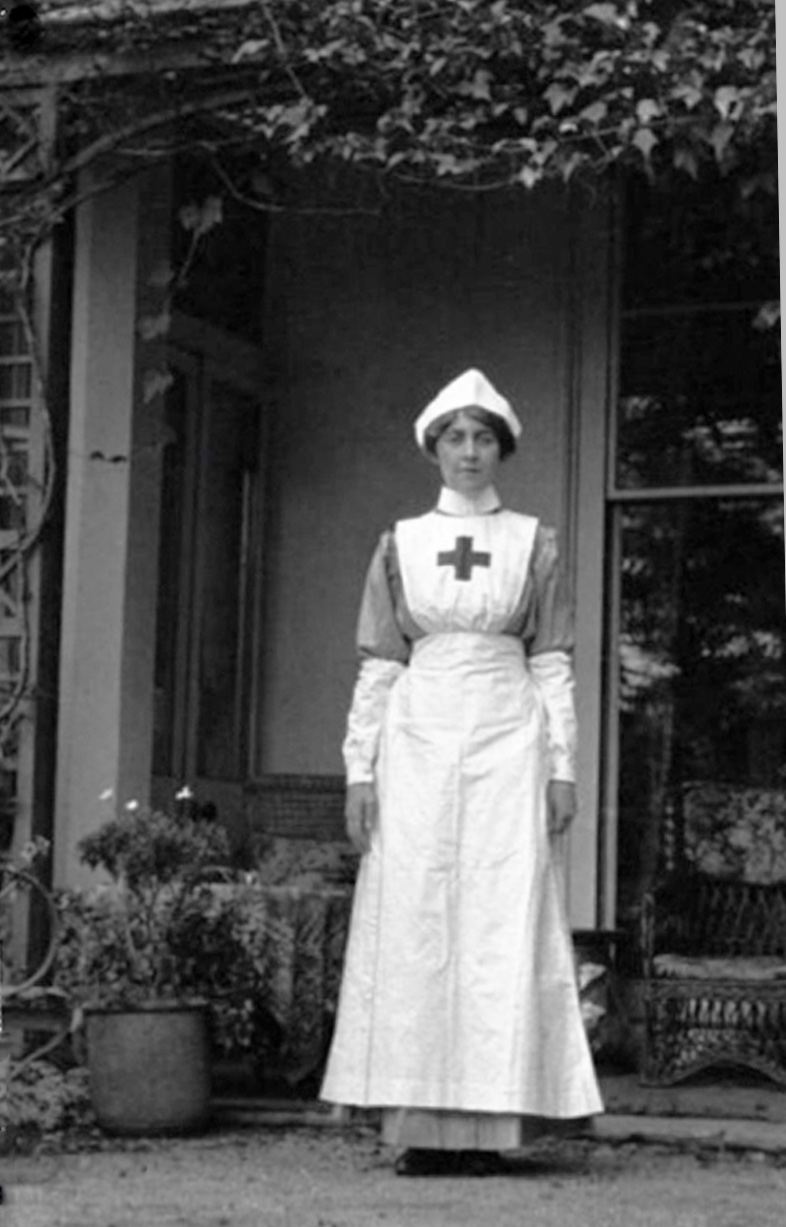
Agatha Christie in 1915

Agatha Mary Clarissa Miller was born in 1890 into an upper-middle-class family that had once been wealthy but had grown poorer over time, and in which the Victorian spirit prevailed, along with, as a result, rather conservative, patriarchal views on family and society. In keeping with such traditions she received an unsystematic home education, intended above all to prepare her for the role of a good wife and mother. Researchers believe that the events of December 1926 were in many ways rooted in Agatha's early upbringing: "…for it was then, surprisingly enough, that the seeds were sown from which her later misfortunes would grow." Jared Cade, the author of this observation and a researcher of the "queen of crime's" disappearance, concluded that the "ideal" relationship of the future writer's parents influenced the fact that she too was destined for such a marriage and merely had "to grow up": "Parental love, combined with their full and eventful life, gave Agatha a happy and untroubled childhood, but it did not teach her to properly withstand the blows that fate had in store for her." Later Agatha herself emphasised the importance of Victorian values and the patriarchal character of family relations, which were deeply rooted features of the society of that period:

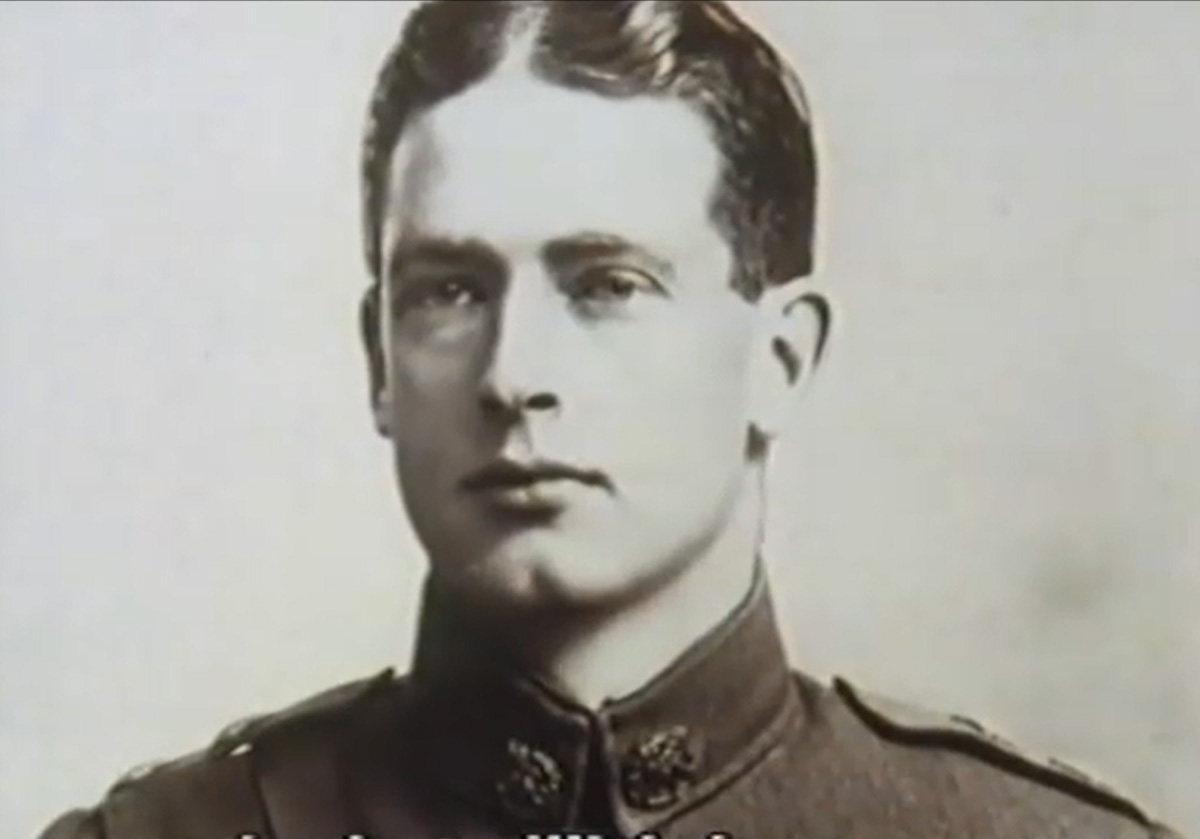
Archibald Christie in 1915. One of the many photographs of him circulated by the press in December 1926

The Millers' financial position deteriorated considerably after the death of Agatha's father, Frederick, in 1901, after which her mother Clarissa took on responsibility for the family; Agatha had a very warm relationship with her. At the age of eighteen she wrote short stories, some of which were later reworked and published ("The House of Dreams, The Last Séance, The Call of Wings).

With the outbreak of World War I, Agatha volunteered as a nurse at a military hospital, and somewhat later worked in the hospital dispensary. During this same period, at the end of December 1914, she married a military aviator whom she had begun seeing before the war, and took his surname, which she would later make famous. In 1916 Agatha completed her first detective novel, The Mysterious Affair at Styles, which was published only in 1920 by the publishing house The Bodley Head. For some time Christie still believed she was not going to pursue a literary career seriously, especially since neither the modest initial fee nor the financially unfavourable contract encouraged her to do so. Moreover, for a long time she considered her true calling to be that of a good wife and mother, seeing herself first and foremost as a "married lady" rather than a writer. Her desire to help her mother financially did much to inspire her second novel, since her mother found it difficult to maintain the family villa, "Ashfield", in her native Torquay. Agatha's husband advised her to write another novel, since it could earn money, and she, always relying on him in financial matters, agreed. Thus in 1922 the novel The Secret Adversary was published by the same house, The Bodley Head. The following year she finished The Murder on the Links, in which she returned to her detective duo — Hercule Poirot and Captain Hastings. In August 1919 Agatha gave birth to her only child, a daughter, Rosalind Hicks.

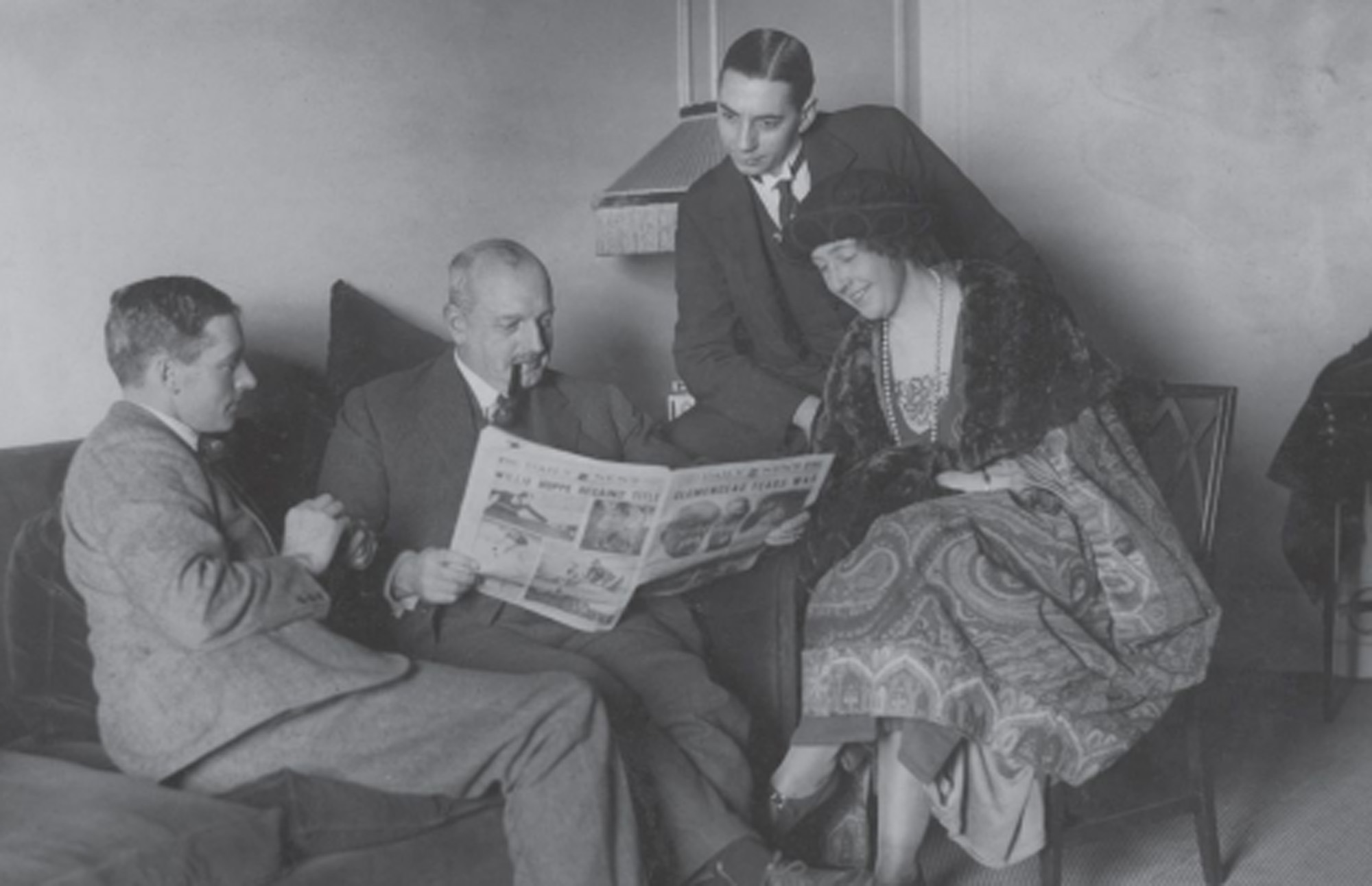
Archie Christie (far left), Major Belcher, Mr Bates (secretary) and Agatha Christie (far right) during the British Empire tour, 1922

In 1922, together with her husband, who had accepted an offer to work as a financial adviser to Major Ernest Belcher, Agatha undertook a round-the-world sea voyage through British possessions. On returning home, Archie learned that the company he had previously worked for in the City had not kept his position open. He became unemployed, which he found painful. As head of the family he tried to find some kind of work in order to maintain the social status expected of people of their circle. Ekaterina Tsimbaeva, a Russian biographer of Agatha Christie, noted that alongside the pleasure of the round-the-world cruise came the problems it caused with work, housing and raising their daughter, and the couple found this period difficult, even "having to pay for it with nervous breakdowns".

After the publication in August 1924 of Christie's fourth novel, The Man in the Brown Suit (which drew on the author's impressions of South Africa gained during the "imperial" cruise), her original publisher offered to extend her contract on more favourable terms. She refused, however, and found herself a literary agent, Edmund Cork, with whom she continued to work for the rest of her life. That same year the editors of the Evening News approached Christie for the right to serialise The Man in the Brown Suit in their newspaper, offering £500. The family saw this as a major success; the writer's husband could hardly believe it, while her mother Clarissa reacted more restrainedly, believing that her daughter fully deserved such recognition.

=== Family troubles ===
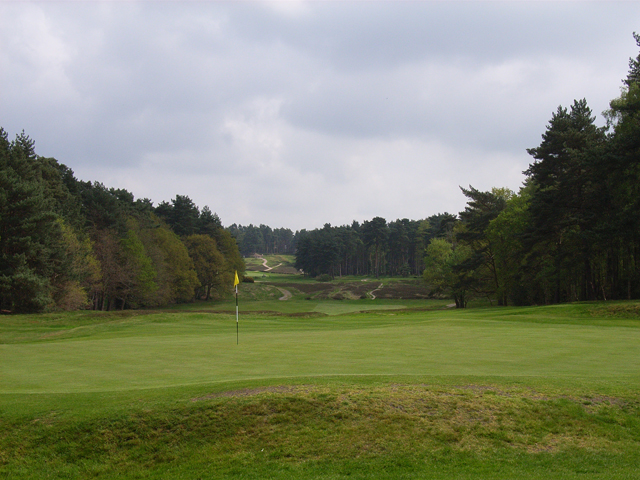
The golf courses at Sunningdale have long been popular

By the mid-1920s relations between the Christies had grown strained; Agatha would occasionally remind Archie, who had been out of work for a time, that the money he was spending came from her fees. She was also irritated that her husband did not give her enough attention, while he, was uncomfortable with his wife's growing fame. It also upset her that he took little interest in her writing: when she asked him to listen to the idea for a new book and give his opinion, he categorically refused. The family's financial position improved after Archie took a prestigious and respectable job in the City of London, earning around £2,000, which boosted his self-esteem and restored his peace of mind.

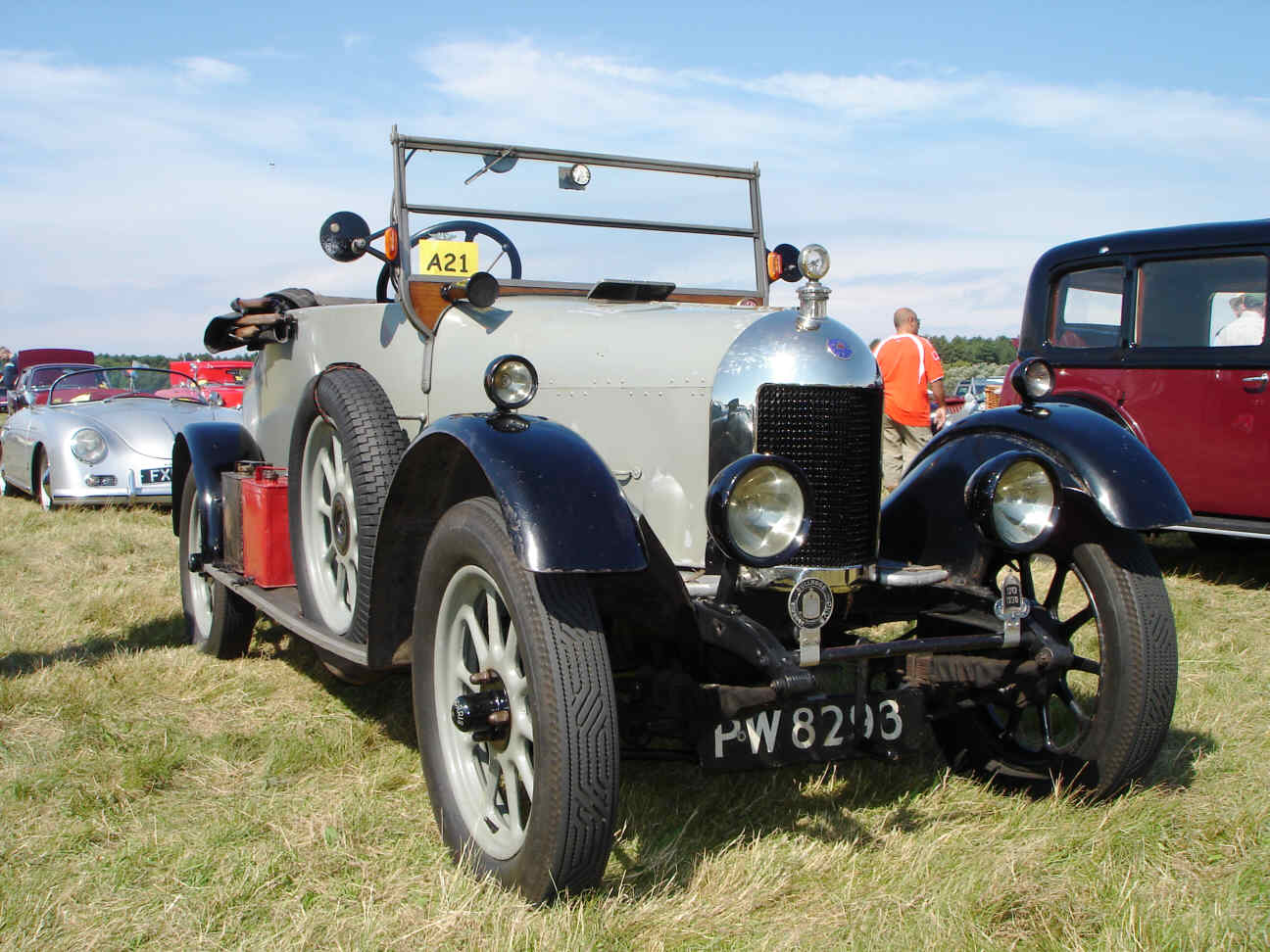
A Morris Cowley "Bullnose", modern photograph

The Christies then decided to move to the outskirts of London; this was encouraged by the fact that Archie had become keen on golf (a game his wife had originally introduced him to), and outside the metropolis he would find it much more convenient to pursue his favourite pastime. The couple began spending significantly less time together, and Agatha later wrote that she had effectively become what is called a "golf widow". With the fee she received for The Man in the Brown Suit, the Christies bought a "long-nosed", "faithful" Morris Cowley, which became Agatha's favourite means of transport. She later recalled it many times with great warmth, as a source of enormous pleasure. After a few lessons from her husband, despite her initial timidity, she gradually mastered the art of driving. The couple settled with their daughter Rosalind in fashionable Sunningdale, in an estate (cottage) divided into four flats. It was during this time that Agatha realised she could become a professional writer. "Though I still had no confidence. I still thought writing was rather like embroidering sofa cushions," she wrote later in her Autobiography. Jared Cade suggested that it was precisely on the grounds of his wife's professional and financial success that Archie's discontent arose. He may have been "irritated by the attention now being paid to Agatha". The writer Laura Thompson, who partly acknowledges some rationality in this "sensualist" interpretation, rejected treating it as an absolute, since, in her words, Cade presented it as an "indisputable fact".

In early spring 1925, Agatha was fully occupied with her work, unaware that, owing to his passion for golf, her husband had begun an affair with a young and lively office typist, Nancy Neele, an acquaintance of Major Belcher's whom Agatha mistakenly calls his secretary in her Autobiography. In June, The Secret of Chimneys was published, Christie's fifth book under contract with Bodley Head. After this she freed herself from her obligations to the publisher she had come to dislike and signed an agreement with William Collins, Sons, with whom she would go on to work for the rest of her life. In the summer of 1925, after finishing work on The Murder of Roger Ackroyd, (Note: John Curran, a researcher of Agatha Christie's Secret Notebooks, concluded that the drafts of the novel did not survive owing to her "dramatic disappearance" and divorce.) which brought her considerable fame, the Christies went on holiday to Cauterets, in the French Hautes-Pyrénées. After returning to England, Archie's affair with Nancy resumed, though the exact extent of their closeness (including whether it was sexual) cannot be established with certainty, and various views exist on the matter.

At the start of 1926, at her husband's insistence, the Christies bought a mansion in Sunningdale which, at his suggestion, was named Styles, after the writer's first published novel. Researchers regard this costly purchase itself as evidence that Agatha's husband did not yet intend to end their relationship for good in order to marry another woman. Although the house had a bad reputation — there were rumours that misfortune awaited its inhabitants — Agatha nonetheless agreed to her husband's wishes, perhaps believing it might bring them closer together. However, the couple's relationship did not improve, despite her efforts. Moreover, after finishing the novel and the exhausting move, the writer was utterly worn out and told her husband she needed a holiday, but he said he was not going anywhere. She decided to insist on her own plans and went with her sister Madge to Calvi on Corsica, though even there she could not forget her difficult marital problems. After returning to England, relations between Agatha and her husband remained strained. On 5 April 1926, her mother died, which further alienated Agatha from Archie, since he could not bear illness or death and the associated cares, and did not attend the funeral because he was in Spain on business for his company. He returned to England a week after the funeral, but relations with his wife did not improve, and they argued a great deal. Agatha inherited her mother's house, Ashfield, in Torquay, where she had spent her childhood and which she loved dearly. To put it in order she moved there with her daughter, while her husband came only occasionally from London, since he disliked staying there. Her husband was constantly in a bad mood and irritable, and Agatha asked him to explain himself. For a while he tried to avoid a heart-to-heart conversation, but in August 1926, at Ashfield, on their daughter's seventh birthday, Archie finally admitted that he was in love with Nancy Neele. From this event onward there is a gap of half a year in the writer's memoirs.

Agatha was raised, like people of her time and class, believing that the divorce was something extraordinary. The institution itself, and its consequences, filled her with unpleasant feelings — as she put it, "horror". Moreover, she believed divorce to be especially unacceptable when there were children in the family. Agatha decided to fight for her marriage, reasoning that this was a brief infatuation on Archie's part, made worse by the fact that after her mother's death she had not given him enough attention. She moved back into their house, Styles, and two weeks after declaring his love for another woman, Archie too returned, saying he wanted to try to restore their relationship and proposing a three-month trial period. Huguette Bouchardeau suggested that her husband had decided to confess his feelings to his wife, but then chose to hold off for a time without actually ending his relationship with his mistress.

Alongside her devoted secretary Charlotte, the writer's chief comfort was her beloved terrier, Peter, of whom she later said that he had brought her back to life. A decade later, referring to the events of 1926, when she had been in a "dreadful state", she wrote in a letter: "…at that time no one but the dog could support me." To change their surroundings and try to mend their family life, at Agatha's suggestion the couple went on holiday to the south of France, to the Biarritz area, a place associated with her happy childhood, where they stayed until November. This trip, intended to save the marriage, proved even less successful than the one the previous year. Moreover, Agatha, already in a depressed state, was nearly driven "out of her mind" with grief when Peter was hit by a car and she believed him dead; to her delight, however, the terrier recovered after a while. (Note: The faithful dog died in 1938, and his owner grieved deeply over his loss. Dumb Witness (1937) carries an unusual dedication to Peter, reading: "…most faithful of friends and dearest of companions, a dog in a thousand.") This, however, did not improve matters; the quarrels continued, and during one of them Agatha even threw a teapot at her husband. On Friday 3 December, during their most serious quarrel yet, Archie declared that he was no longer willing to tolerate her behaviour and categorically demanded a divorce, since he intended to marry Nancy Neele.

=== Circumstances of the disappearance ===
After her quarrel with her husband on 3 December 1926, Agatha disappeared from Styles, leaving her daughter Rosalind and the household in the care of the servants. (Note: A few days later the cook and the maid were dismissed, apparently for disclosing family secrets.) She left a letter to her secretary, Charlotte Fisher (Carlo), in which she claimed she was heading for Yorkshire. Her disappearance caused an enormous public stir, since she was already a fairly well-known figure with a growing number of admirers of her work. Headlines devoted to her disappearance appeared alongside reports of the death of the celebrated French painter Claude Monet. The extent of the publicity the case received is also illustrated by the fact that as early as the Monday, a front-page article in The New York Times was headlined: "Mrs. Agatha Christie, Novelist, Disappears In Strange Way From Her Home in England".

The morning after she left the house in an unknown direction, her car was found in the county of Surrey, near the town of Newlands Corner, five miles from Guildford, less than three hundred metres from the top of a hill, with its headlights still on, at the edge of a chalk quarry. The drop at that spot was 183 metres. There were no brake marks on the ground; the only personal items of Agatha's inside the car were a fur coat, a small case of clothes and her driving licence. At dawn on 4 December, the abandoned car was noticed by a shepherd on his way to work, but he attached no importance to it. It was only after the motor-racing driver Frederick Dore called the police shortly after eight o'clock that the matter became public. In the report drawn up on the matter by a police inspector, it was noted that the abandoned car might indicate the likelihood of "some unusual occurrence": "The car was found down below, on the grassy verge among the bushes, having run off the main road." Certain facts raised suspicions of suicide: the absence of brake marks, and the fact that the terrier Peter had stayed at home, though his owner almost always took him along on her trips.

Archibald Christie learned of his wife's disappearance from her secretary, Charlotte. She telephoned him at Godalming, where, as had become usual of late, he was spending the weekend with Nancy Neele at the home of friends, Sam and Madge James. (Note: It was Madge who had introduced Archie Christie and Nancy Neele.) Carlo told him that police officers investigating Agatha's disappearance had come to their house in Sunningdale. Archie then contacted them. In answer to the officers' questions, the colonel said he knew nothing of his wife's whereabouts, as he had last seen her when leaving for work on the Friday. On returning home he found a letter from his wife on the hall table, accusing him of betrayal, and after reading it he burned it. It is thought by some that Agatha may have deliberately left the letter in plain sight, expecting it to be found by the police.

From the servants and from Carlo, certain events of the previous week became known. On the Monday Agatha had spent time with her friend Mrs. de Silva, and on the Wednesday the two of them had gone shopping in London. There Agatha spent the night at the "Forum" club, of which de Silva was the owner. The next morning Agatha held discussions with her publishers, covering issues connected with the publication of The Big Four and difficulties in finishing The Mystery of the Blue Train, which had been progressing slowly owing to her family troubles. The writer returned home on the Thursday, and that evening she and Charlotte went dancing nearby in Ascot. Carlo saw her employer on Friday morning, when Agatha was spending time with Rosalind. She was in good spirits and allowed her secretary to go to London for the day. On Friday evening, around six o'clock, the secretary telephoned Agatha to ask how things were going. This was after the quarrel had already broken out and Archie had said he wanted a divorce. According to Charlotte, in this, their last conversation before the disappearance, Agatha was calm; she wished her secretary a good rest in London and asked her to return to Styles on the Saturday. On Friday, at eleven at night, Agatha returned to the Christie house, where the maid and cook were, worried by their mistress's unexpected disappearance. They reported that Agatha had kissed her sleeping daughter and, after stroking her beloved terrier Peter, had driven off in an unknown direction at 9:45pm. Agatha left Charlotte a note asking her to cancel a hotel booking in Beverley, where she had intended to go for the weekend. Carlo was troubled by this message, in particular by the following lines: "My head is splitting. I cannot stay in this house any longer." Charlotte wanted to report her suspicions to the police at once but did not do so, fearing reproach from her employer.

=== Search ===
Since the events surrounding Agatha's disappearance concerned two counties, the search was initially carried out by the police forces of Surrey and Berkshire, whose respective heads took different public positions on the missing woman's fate. While Chief Inspector Goddard of Berkshire was measured and reserved in public, Kenward of the corresponding Surrey force, by contrast, made loud and contradictory statements about the progress of the investigation. He proceeded on the assumption that Agatha was most likely dead. Thus, the day after the abandoned car was found, he told the press that he intended to use an aeroplane in the search, later denying his own statement: "The police have nothing to do with any aeroplane." Under Kenward's direction a notice was drawn up giving Agatha's description and details of the circumstances of her disappearance. It was sent to 48 nearby police stations, giving her age as 35, although Agatha was in fact a year older. According to this document, attention was to be given to finding a woman five feet seven inches tall (over 170 cm), matching the following description: "Hair auburn (fox-trot bob), teeth natural, eyes grey, complexion fresh, build medium."

Gradually the police began reconstructing the events preceding the disappearance and were largely inclined to blame Archie. On learning of the quarrel that had taken place between the Christies the day before, the police realised it was important to establish her whereabouts as quickly as possible, since under the circumstances the missing woman's life might genuinely be in danger. On the Saturday, searches were carried out in the area where her car had been found, involving eight police officers and several detectives. The search continued the following day in the area of Newlands Corner, where the searchers' attention was drawn to Silent Pool. The pool was already known through a legend that the English king John had once seen a bathing woman there and pursued her; trying to escape him, she drowned, and the same fate befell her brother, who tried to save her. Many were inclined to think that the same fate had befallen Agatha. On the Monday, dozens of local residents took part in the search around Newlands Corner. With the help of these volunteers it was possible to search the woodland and the surrounding fields.

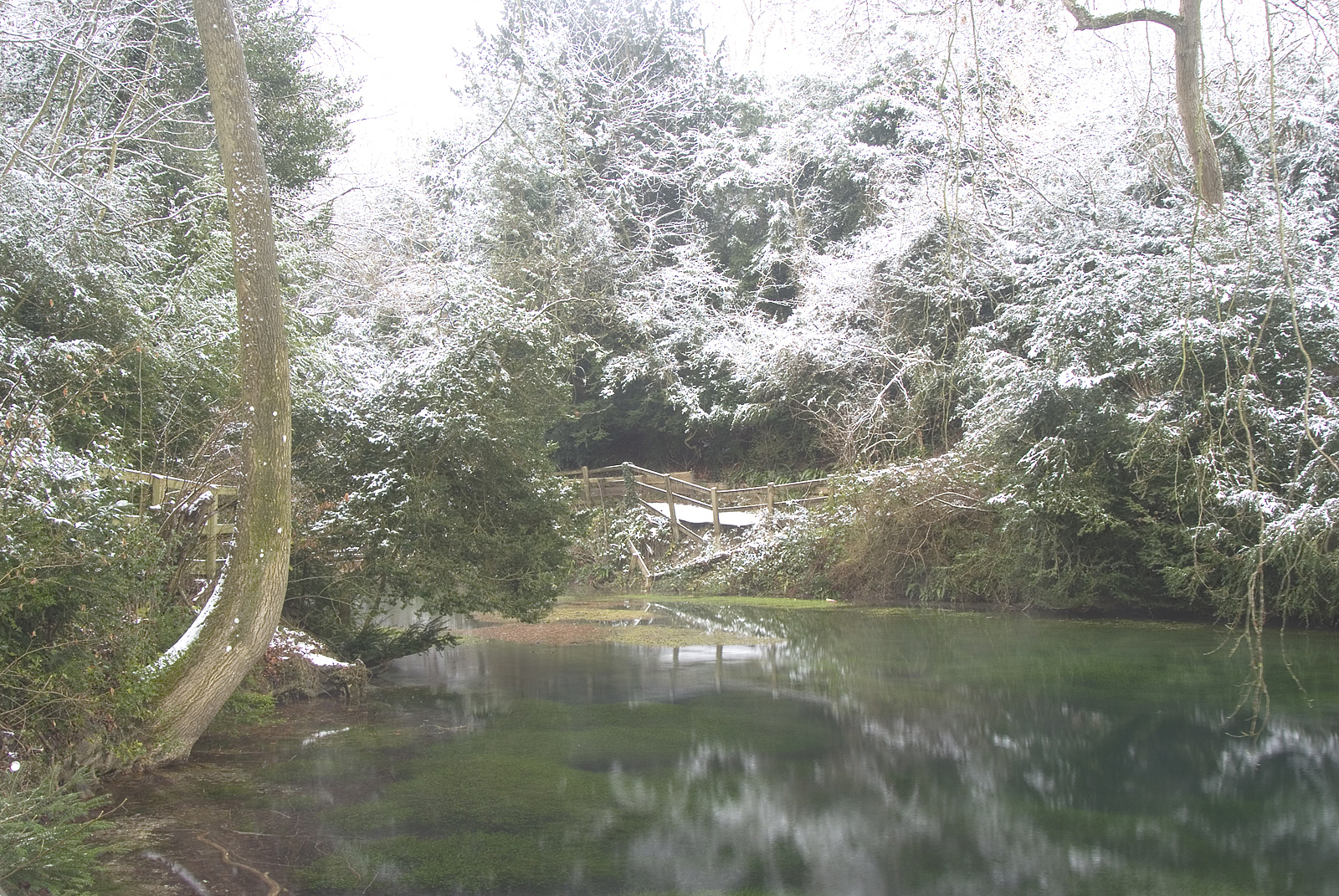
Silent Pool, 2015

At the start of the search the police were unaware of the existence of another letter, written by Agatha on the Friday and addressed to her brother-in-law, Campbell Christie, a lecturer at the Royal Military Academy, Woolwich. It had been posted from London that very morning when her abandoned car was found. In this letter she said she would be spending the weekend at a spa resort in Yorkshire. On receiving the letter, Archie's brother did not immediately inform the police, since he did not yet know of his sister-in-law's disappearance. Reading of her disappearance in the Monday morning papers, he telephoned his brother and sent him the envelope of the letter by courier, since the letter itself had somehow been mislaid. However, for some time neither the police nor the press treated this as significant, and this line of inquiry was not seriously pursued for a while.

Three days after her disappearance, Archie went to Scotland Yard to have the case taken up on a national scale, but was told that until a request was received from the Surrey and Berkshire police, they could not take on the search. Initially, Scotland Yard confined itself to distributing Agatha's description to the media and to police stations across the country. The Christie house became the focus of onlookers, the press and the police. Rosalind, who was told that her mother's absence was due to her working on a book somewhere quiet, went to school accompanied by a police officer, while officers kept watch at the door and by the telephone. While Carlo readily gave interviews, Archie's behaviour aroused suspicion and irritated journalists. Her husband tried in every way to keep outsiders away from this family matter, claiming that his wife's nerves had given way and that she had gone off somewhere without any particular destination. He became the object of intense attention from the press and from people he had never known before, of whom he said: "My telephone doesn't stop ringing. Everyone is asking about my wife. Even clairvoyants call me, offering to help find her for money." It is thought that his behaviour may have been influenced by a desire not to damage his professional reputation and to protect the interests of the woman he loved. Sebastian Earl, a colleague of Archie's, later recalled his state at the time: "He was terribly on edge, complaining that the police were following him everywhere, believing him to be his wife's murderer. Every day he seemed to waste away a little more."

A wide variety of theories about the disappearance were put forward. The most widespread held that Agatha had stopped on the plateau at Newlands Corner, then mistakenly put the car into the wrong gear, and it had rolled down the slope. It was not ruled out that her disappearance was connected with a sudden bout of amnesia. Some suggested she had had an arranged meeting at Newlands Corner, where she had transferred to another car, been killed, and her body hidden. There was talk that Archie had killed Agatha, or that she had run off with a lover. Stanley Bishop of the Daily Express, for instance, was convinced that Agatha's murder had been carried out by her own husband. Laura Thompson later wrote that these baseless speculations had nothing to do with reality but were repeated in various forms by reporters: "…even if he had not killed his wife, journalists believed it plausible that he had driven her to suicide." Suspicion of involvement in Agatha's death was even directed at the loyal Carlo, and it is thought that such hints were made towards the secretary even by the police.

According to the initial official police theory, the writer had crashed her car, abandoned it and become lost in the woods. It was also popular in society to believe that this had been done for publicity purposes, in order to boost sales of her books, in particular The Murder of Roger Ackroyd. This view was reinforced by the fact that the Liverpool Weekly Post had, from 4 December, begun serialising the novel under the writer's real name. Be that as it may, interest in her work genuinely increased; she became a celebrity of more than national standing, and her books began selling better. On Tuesday 7 December the press learned the contents of Christie's letter to her brother-in-law. Journalists concluded that she was most likely to have gone to one of the hotels in Harrogate. However, the investigations of reporters from the Daily Chronicle and the Daily Express came to nothing, since it was established that no one had registered as Agatha Christie at these hotels. A few days later witnesses came forward claiming to have earlier seen a woman resembling the person being sought.

On 10 December Archie gave an extensive interview to the Daily Mail, in which he stated that his wife had previously discussed the possibility of her own unexpected disappearance. In one conversation with her sister she had said that if she wanted to, she could disappear, and could do so without much effort. According to Archie, the subject had most likely arisen while discussing a real case reported in a newspaper. He suggested that his wife might have staged her own disappearance, which could be connected with her writing, and that he personally would very much like to believe this version of events. He also set out his own theories of what had happened: a deliberate disappearance, loss of memory, or suicide. He himself was inclined to believe the first, though loss of memory following severe nervous strain could not be ruled out; the theory of suicide, however, he rejected. According to him, she had never threatened to take her own life, but if she had decided to do so, she would have used poison, since she often used it as a means of murder in her books (something he disapproved of, though she held to her own opinion). He also remarked: "If she had wanted to take poison, she would have done so. She always got everything she wanted." He also pointed out that, for someone intending suicide, she had behaved very rationally: she had driven dozens of miles, had begun walking about in an unfamiliar rural area and, having taken off her fur coat, had carefully folded it on the back seat of the car. Colonel Christie suggested that she must have walked down from the hill, since she had never liked climbing uphill.

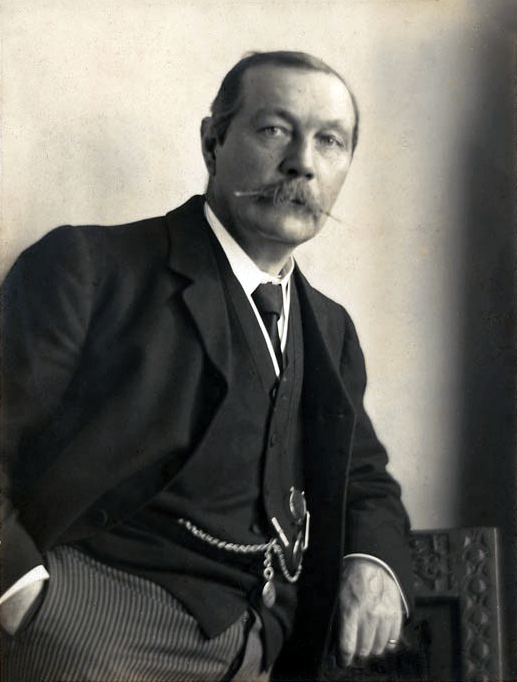
Arthur Conan Doyle, who had an interest in spiritualism, brought a medium into the search for Agatha Christie

At one point, several hundred police officers — according to some accounts, more than a thousand — were involved in the search for Christie, alongside thousands of civilian volunteers. Some literary celebrities also became involved. Arthur Conan Doyle, who had long had an interest in spiritualism, gave one of Christie's gloves to a medium he knew, Horace Leaf, so that he might determine her whereabouts. According to the writer, Leaf, without knowing whose gloves they were, correctly identified the owner's name — though admittedly one on everybody's lips in England at the time — and stated that she was alive and would make herself known before long. According to him, this would become known on Wednesday, 15 December. When this indeed occurred, Doyle found further confirmation of his religious views, for which he had repeatedly been criticised. He subsequently published an article in The Morning Post arguing that law enforcement agencies ought to make use of mediums in the investigation of crimes.

Edgar Wallace suggested in a newspaper article that the disappearance had been an unexpected emotional reaction to certain events in the writer's personal life: "One may suppose that this is an attempt, in some sense, to cease to exist, or to become invisible." In his view, she had for some time been in a difficult state and had contemplated suicide, before deciding instead to disappear. After all her nocturnal wanderings, she had apparently decided to rest at some hotel, where she remained until the Sunday, when her fate began to interest the media. She had not anticipated the uproar her absence would cause. Wallace concluded, in an opinion that gained fairly wide currency in public discourse: "If Agatha Christie has not died of shock and nervous strain, then she is certainly alive and entirely of sound mind, and possibly in London. Having lost her memory, one cannot find one's way anywhere."

On 12 December, the largest search operations were organized, involving a large number of volunteers, among whom was another well-known detective novelist — Dorothy L. Sayers. Several estimates of the number of volunteers have survived: 5,000, 10,000, and even 15,000 people. The cautious The Times wrote of "only" 2,000 participants. According to the description by Evening News reporters, these events went down in history as the "great hunt for Mrs Christie". The bottom of the Silent Pool was dragged, and the surrounding area was searched with dogs. It was then decided to divide the territory into sectors and search it section by section. However, these measures did not clarify the situation and produced no results. According to press reports, the discovery of several women's handbags in the area was seen as a promising find; the Daily Express, for instance, described them as important evidence. On December 13, a theory spread that the missing woman might have disguised herself as a man and fled, and the Daily News even reported that her husband had conducted a "thorough inspection" of his own clothing to check whether anything was missing. Newspapers published not only ordinary photographs of Agatha Christie but also photographs of her with an altered appearance, for example wearing a wig and glasses. Laura Thompson described the events of that day as "newspaper madness" and the "climax" of the search for Agatha.

After this, contradictions again emerged in the approaches taken by the police leadership of the neighbouring counties conducting the investigation. Goddard supported Archie's view that Agatha had not committed suicide, stating clearly: "I would support this theory if I had any grounds at all for believing she is dead". By contrast, his colleague, Superintendent Kenward, believed that "Mrs Christie is dead and her body lies somewhere near Newlands Corner".

=== Discovery ===
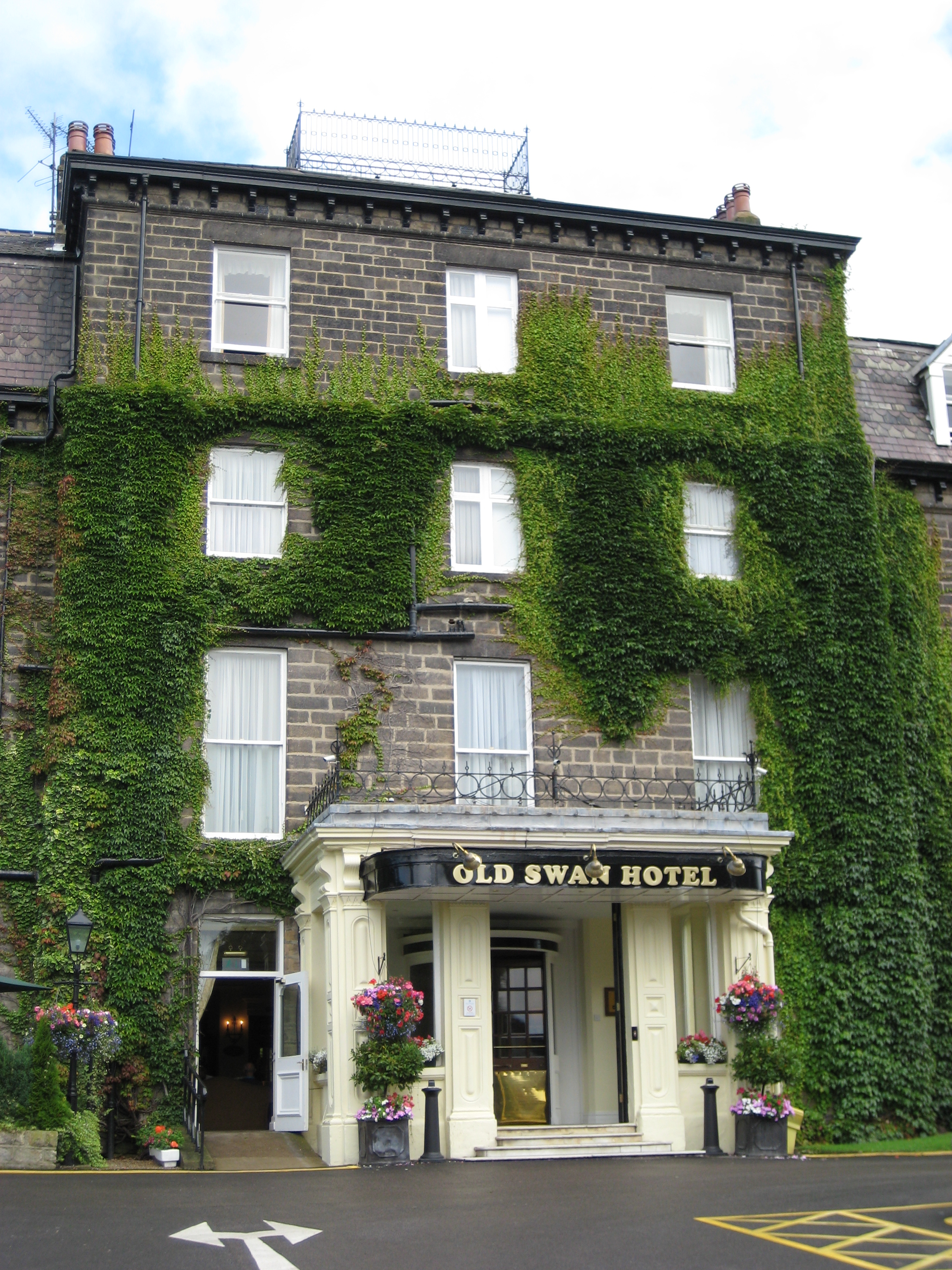
The Swan Hydropathic Hotel, where Agatha Christie hid and was found

On 14 December Agatha was finally found — while reading newspaper reports on the progress of the nationwide search for her. It turned out that she had registered under the surname of her husband's mistress, as Teresa Neele, (Note: Some newspapers mistakenly reported that Christie had registered as "Mrs. Teresa Neele" written as one word.) at the fashionable spa hotel the Swan Hydropathic Hotel (now the Old Swan Hotel) in Harrogate, North Yorkshire. She had arrived at the hotel by taxi on Saturday, 4 December, at around seven in the evening, and said she had come from Cape Town, South Africa, that she was in England for the first time, and had been in the country for three weeks. The only personal items she had with her were a handbag and a small case. Since it was just before the Christmas holidays, the hotel was not full, and she had no trouble taking room five, a small room with a bath. She kept to herself, behaving modestly and reluctant to engage with anyone. When one of the maids asked how she was feeling, Agatha replied that she was very tired, that she had some problems, and that she "had to sort everything out".

It was a hotel chambermaid who first noticed the resemblance. In time her colleagues came to the conclusion that their guest closely resembled the missing woman, and that she also carried a handbag matching the description given in the newspapers. They reported this to the hotel's proprietor, Mrs Taylor, who instructed them not to disclose the information, so as not to draw the establishment into a scandal or disturb the other guests. On Sunday, 12 December, at 11:00, the drummer Bob Tappin and the saxophonist Bob Leeming, who performed in the hotel's musical entertainments, reported to the police that they had seen a woman there resembling the missing writer. Following this, Officer Gilbert McDowall of the Yorkshire police, who had been placed in charge of the identification, reported to his colleagues in Surrey on the resemblance between the hotel guest and the missing woman. This information was then passed on to Carlo in Sunningdale. She was unable to travel for the identification herself, however, as she was looking after Rosalind at the time and had to collect her from school. Agatha's secretary telephoned Archie's office, and he set off for the hotel in Harrogate without delay, arriving in the town at around 6:30pm. According to press reports, Archie and McDowall waited in the hotel lobby near the lift so that Agatha's husband could identify her when she came down for dinner. As her husband was approaching the hotel, Agatha, wearing a pink evening dress, was playing billiards. Word that a reunion of the Christies was imminent had reached the press, but the police tried to keep reporters out of the hotel until the right moment. After Agatha made her way to her table (at around 7:30pm), Archie recognised her and signalled as much; at that moment she was holding a newspaper carrying the story of her disappearance along with her photograph.

Christie offered no explanation for her disappearance, citing amnesia. According to a witness to the identification, when Agatha saw her husband she behaved as though she did not recognise him. According to other accounts, she did in fact recognise him but gave no sign of it. In a statement to the press, given only to a correspondent of The Yorkshire Post, her husband said that the hotel guest was indeed his wife. She had suffered a complete loss of memory, did not recognise him, did not know where she was, and possibly did not even realise who she herself was. He hoped she would recover, that she would soon feel better, and that the next day they would see doctors in London. He then thanked the police officers who had taken part in the search. It was this "official" version that remained the dominant account among Christie's relatives and family members for decades afterward.

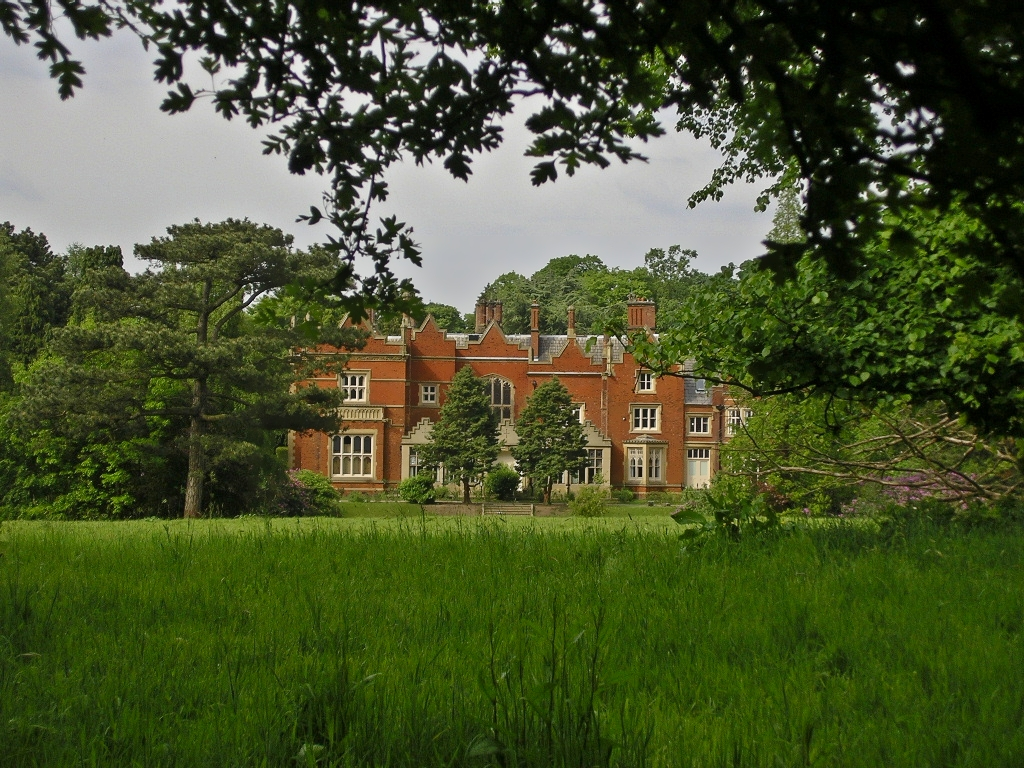
Abney Hall, the estate of Agatha Christie's sister Madge, where she took refuge after the scandal

That evening Archie and Agatha dined together, after which they spent the night in separate rooms, although some of the journalists who had flooded the hotel insisted that they had spent the night together. One correspondent for the Daily Mail managed, with great difficulty, to secure a room at the hotel and stayed awake all night to make sure the famous guest did not "escape". On 15 December, the Christies left the hotel, but instead of going to London, as Archie had earlier announced, they travelled by train to Cheadle, to the estate of Abney Hall, where her sister Madge lived with her husband. This journey took place under the close attention of the press, who literally pursued them along the way and at the stations where they changed trains.

At Abney Hall, Madge's local family doctor, Dr Henry Wilson, and a neurologist from the University of Manchester, Dr Donald Core, were called in. They diagnosed Agatha as suffering "undoubtedly, a genuine loss of memory", recommended that she consult a psychiatrist, and advised that she be "shielded from all anxiety and distress". Madge insisted on this, and Agatha reluctantly agreed, aware of how much trouble she had caused her sister. Christie made an appointment with a psychiatrist on Harley Street in London and took a flat nearby, where she lived with Charlotte and Rosalind. According to Janet Morgan, Christie's official biographer, whose work was approved by the family, after a number of regular sessions with the psychiatrist she recalled much of what had happened to her during her disappearance.

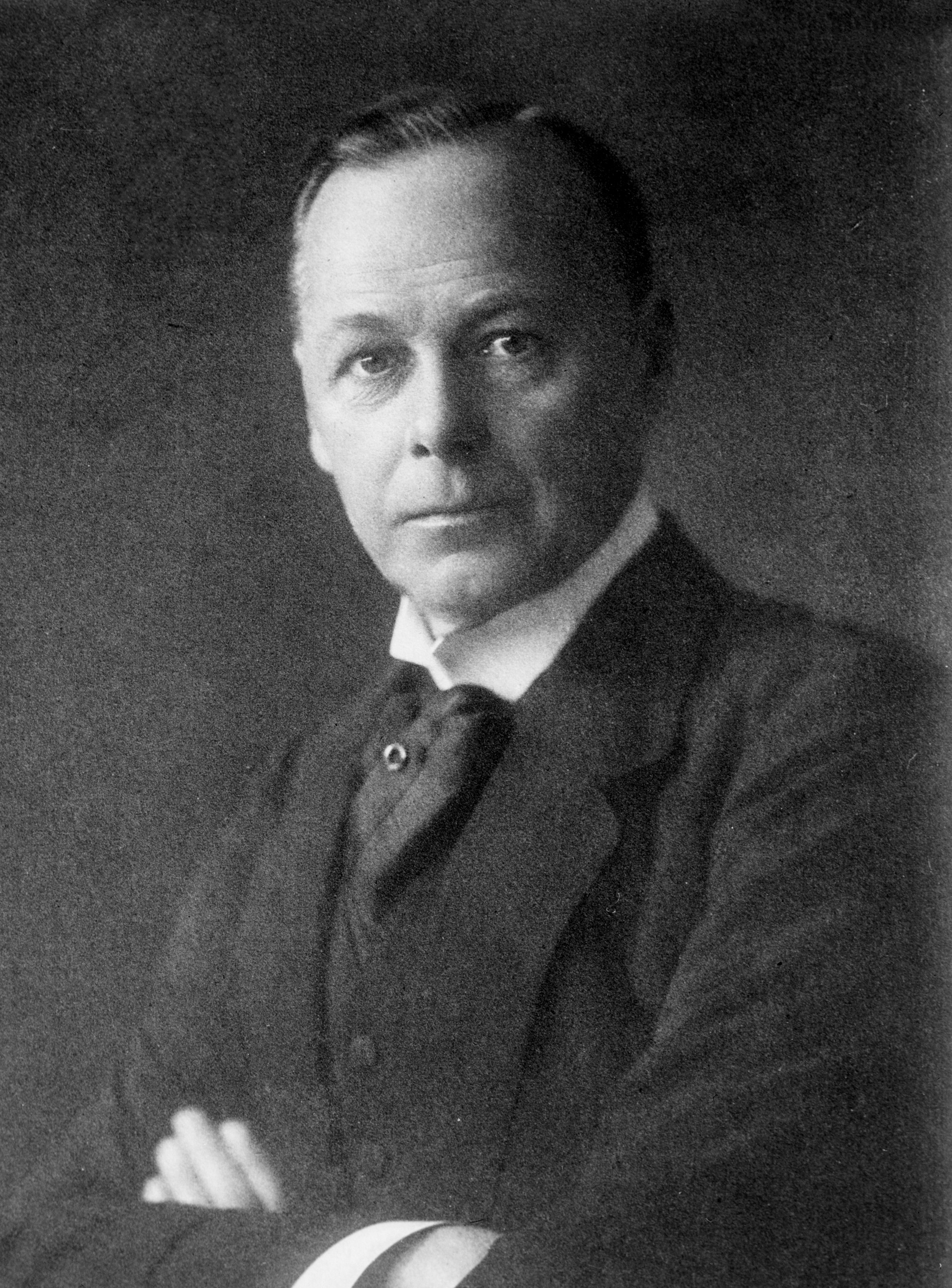
William Joynson-Hicks, British Home Secretary from 1924 to 1929

Some of those who had taken part in the search were angered by Agatha's conduct and demanded reimbursement of their expenses. The press stoked the issue with various estimates ranging anywhere from £1,000 to £25,000. The question of the circumstances of the disappearance, in connection with the costs incurred by the police, was even debated in the British Parliament. Nothing came of it beyond accusations, however, and the Home Secretary, Sir William Joynson-Hicks, stated in response to a parliamentary question that the additional expenses incurred by the search amounted to no more than £12 10s, spent mostly "on hot tea for the police officers". Agatha's husband likewise objected to paying the bills, stating that he had asked no one to incur them, since he had been confident his wife would soon be found, that no more than £25 had been spent on the search, and that as a conscientious taxpayer he was not obliged to reimburse it.

== Further events ==
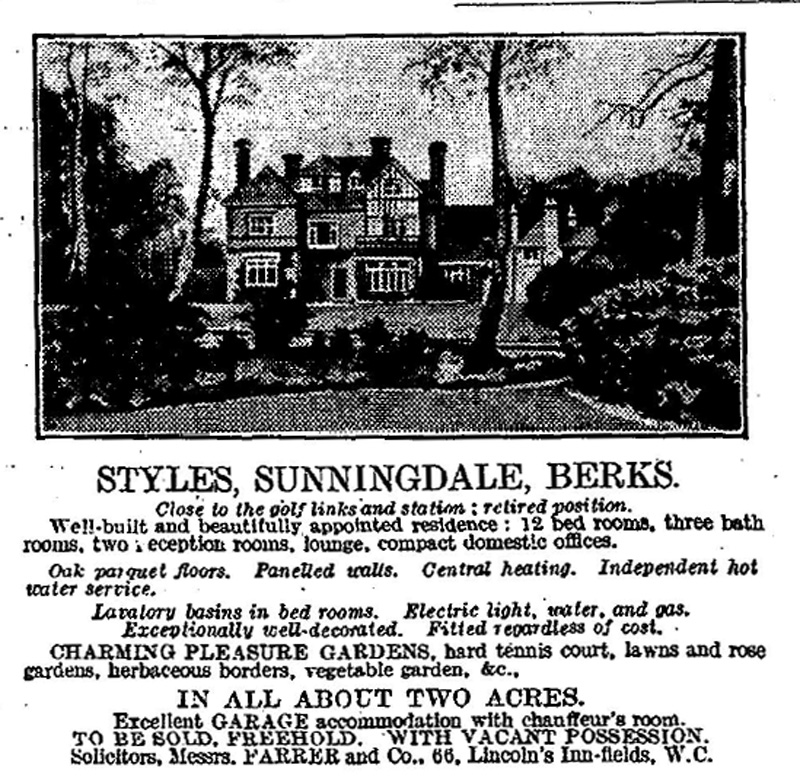
Christie's advertisement for the sale of Styles, 1927

The Christies agreed to take a year's break from their relationship, and Nancy Neele's family sent her on a round-the-world cruise. This, however, did not save the marriage. Despite the mutual affection and love at the start of their relationship, and years of married life, Archibald and Agatha Christie's marriage ended in divorce in 1928. Agatha was obliged to take the blame herself: the alleged adultery was said to have taken place at the Grosvenor Hotel. Nancy Neele's role in the divorce was not mentioned when the case was heard. A few weeks after the Christies' divorce was finalised, Archie and Nancy married, and their marriage is generally considered to have been a happy one. Tsimbaeva suggested that within his marriage to Agatha, her husband had gradually come to resent playing "second fiddle" and wanted to live with a woman who would not challenge his masculine pride — an idea she used to explain his choice and his conduct. Drawing on the central character of the celebrated novel The Murder of Roger Ackroyd, the Russian scholar summed up her view memorably: it was not Nancy Neele who had come between the Christies, but rather the novel's narrator-culprit.

The former spouses did not keep in touch, apart from an occasional exchange of letters. Their daughter Rosalind, however, secretly began corresponding with her father, and in 1956, after Nancy Neele's death, met him in person. Despite the scandalous divorce proceedings, Agatha chose to keep her husband's surname, under which she had become known as a writer. Her devoted secretary, Charlotte Fisher, remained in her employ. Since her mother's death Christie had written nothing for a long time, but left without her husband's financial support she was forced to rely on herself, and, in order to meet her obligations to her publisher as well, she returned once more to her writing. With the help of her brother-in-law Campbell Christie, who had supported her during and after her disappearance, she first reworked twelve short stories into the novel The Big Four, which proved a success and strengthened her resolve to keep writing. After the painful and scandalous end of her marriage, Agatha travelled with Rosalind and Charlotte from England to the Canary Islands, where, through sheer force of will, she finally finished The Mystery of the Blue Train — a novel she later called a failure, perhaps because of the painful memories connected with its composition. It was dedicated to those close to her who had supported her through the preceding dramatic events — "To members of my family — Charlotte and Peter". Left without her husband's financial support, she turned decisively to a professional literary career: personal dramas and circumstances that shattered the familiar world of a Victorian woman, it has been said, helped bring about the emergence of the writer Agatha Christie, who was destined to become the "queen of crime".

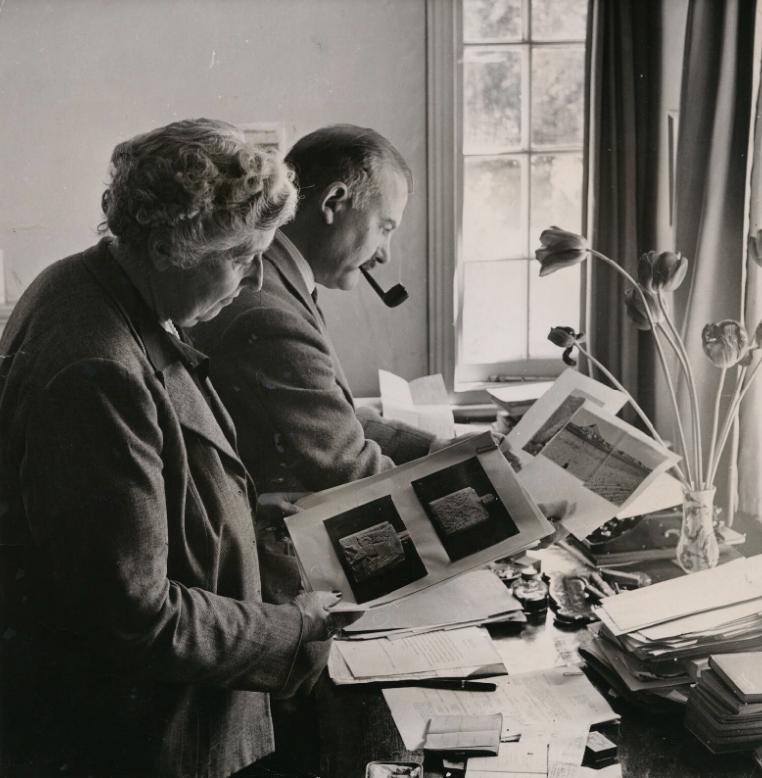
Max Mallowan and Agatha Christie examining photographs of archaeological finds, 1950

After such a scandal, many acquaintances and friends tried to avoid her company, while others, on the contrary, sought to help her and demonstrate their loyalty. In response, she and Carlo devised a kind of private classification, "awarding" those who continued to treat her kindly membership of the "Order of Faithful Dogs," and those who abandoned her the "Order of Rats". Being naturally shy and modest, Agatha withdrew even further from outsiders and the press, very rarely agreeing to interviews. Cade remarked on this, noting that the notoriety which followed her disappearance was what drove her into a more secluded way of life. In the autumn of 1928, on the advice of acquaintances, Agatha travelled by the Orient Express to Istanbul, from where she continued via Damascus in Syria to Iraq, arriving in Baghdad. There she went to visit the archaeological excavation directed by Leonard Woolley at Ur. In 1930, on a second trip to Iraq, she met at the Ur excavation her future husband, the archaeologist Max Mallowan, fifteen years her junior. Despite some initial reluctance to enter into a serious relationship again, as well as her relatives' misgivings, she nonetheless gave herself to this new attachment and accepted his proposal of marriage. They married on 11 September 1930 in Edinburgh, Scotland. Agatha Christie remained married to Mallowan for the rest of her life, until her death in 1976. Over nearly sixty years of work she wrote 68 novels, more than a hundred short stories and 17 plays, and secured her place as one of the world's best-known writers of detective fiction. Over time, her books became among the best-selling in human history, surpassed only by the Bible and the works of William Shakespeare, and she also became the most translated author in history, with over 7,236 translations.

In her extremely detailed Autobiography, published after her death, Christie wrote only briefly of the circumstances of her disappearance: she described how, after her illness, a period of grief and despair had followed, that her heart had been broken, but that she did not wish to dwell on it, and that after enduring a year in the hope that Archie would change his mind — which he did not — her first marriage had come to an end. Jared Cade, who devoted an entire book to Christie's disappearance, Agatha Christie and the Eleven Missing Days, observed that she was unwilling even to mention the disappearance in her memoirs, leaving many readers feeling their expectations had been disappointed; some commentators, he noted, even wondered whether this omission was a form of retaliation against the press, which had kept her constantly under observation for years afterward. It seems that, with time, she came to view the events "more philosophically" (in Janet Morgan's phrase) and reacted less sharply to attempts to revisit her eleven-day disappearance. The biographer offers a telling example of this. In 1960, preparations were under way for celebrations to mark her seventieth birthday, when Agatha learned from her colleague Christianna Brand that a play about her disappearance was being prepared to coincide with the occasion. In a letter to Edmund Cork she wrote that he need not worry about her reaction to the forthcoming production, since arguments about the events of 1926 kept resurfacing, but that she no longer attached much importance to them, remarking that at seventy one simply stops paying attention to what people say about oneself, and that it was better just not to react.

In his memoir Mallowan's Memoirs: Agatha and the Archaeologist (1977), published after Christie's death, Mallowan referred with great delicacy to his wife's first marriage and the circumstances preceding its dissolution. He spoke in highly complimentary terms of Archie's wartime service and personal qualities, attributing the dramatic events of 1926 to a fundamental incompatibility of temperament between the spouses. The situation was made worse, in Mallowan's view, by the fact that for the "extremely sensitive" Agatha, her husband's sudden wish for a divorce came as a genuine shock: she fell into complete despair, suffered a loss of memory, and came close to self-destructive behaviour. However, the support of friends and relatives, her natural zest for life, her new marriage and her writing gradually helped her overcome the psychological trauma she had suffered.

== Reasons and theories behind the disappearance ==
=== Official version ===
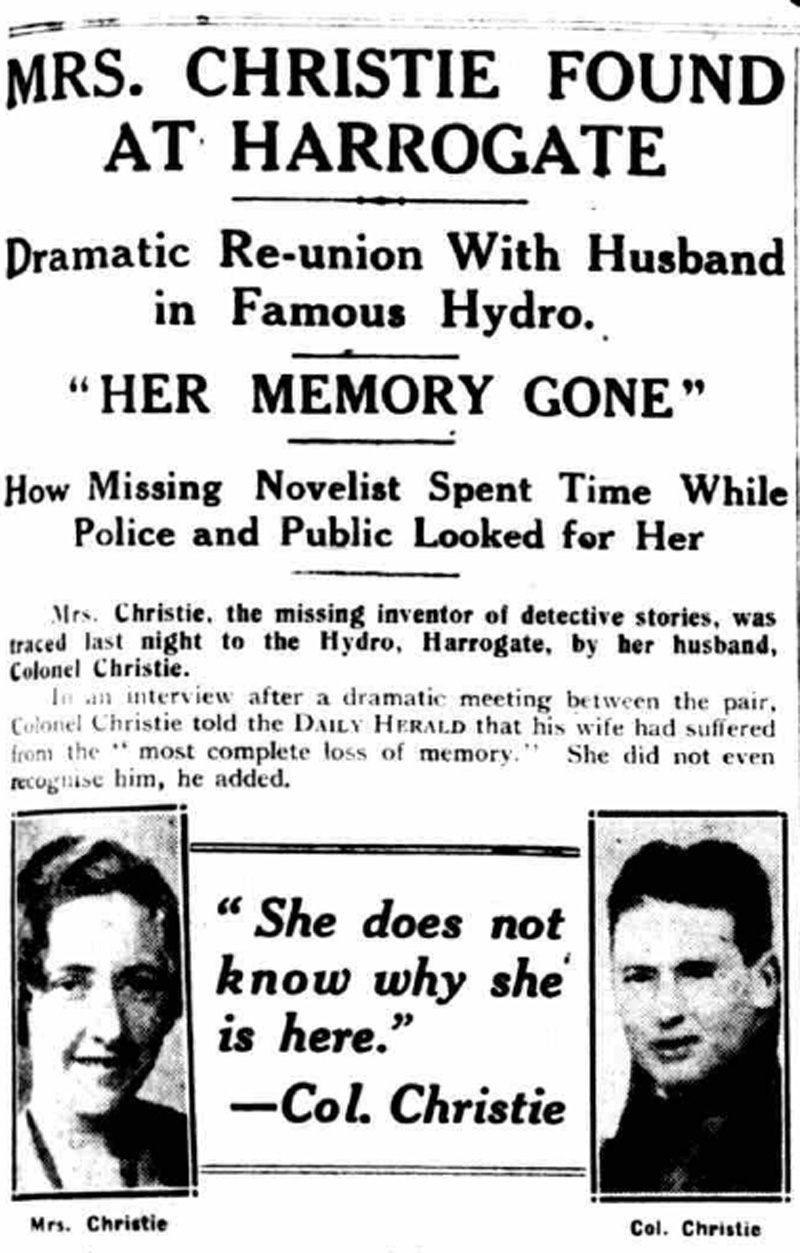
Headline of the Daily Herald article from December 15, 1926, reporting that Mrs Christie had been found at a hotel in Harrogate

The reasons and numerous theories surrounding the famous disappearance have repeatedly become the subject of study and media coverage. Ekaterina Tsimbaeva noted that Agatha never gave any explanation for her actions: "But since this disappearance remains the sole mysterious episode in the life of the creator of so many mystery stories, there has never been, and still is not, any shortage of theories about it".

The family, and the author of the sensation herself, firmly maintained the original "amnesia version", though it did not sound entirely convincing. In 1928, a British court heard a libel case in the course of which the circumstances of Christie's disappearance came to light. During the proceedings, the prosecution referred to "a woman who played a nasty trick on the police." This was an unambiguous allusion to the writer, who was deeply upset by this turn of events. At the time, as Thompson observed, Agatha's conduct became for a while "a symbol of duplicitous behaviour". This forced the woman, censured in the press, to give an interview to the Daily Mail, in which she once again tried to present her version of the sensational events to the public. She also instructed her solicitor, Stuart Bevan, to appear in court, to deny the accusations on her behalf, and to provide a medical certificate concerning her illness. However, the judge objected to this, reasoning that it had no direct bearing on the case, though he noted that Bevan might achieve some of his aims through his actions. This subject remained taboo for a long time among Agatha's relatives and close friends, and she herself found attempts to revisit the events of December 1926 painful. A telling account in this respect comes from her friend Joan Oates. According to her recollections, while in Baghdad, an acquaintance tried to broach the subject in conversation with Christie, but she avoided the question and never associated with that person again.

The writer's relatives consistently denied that her disappearance had been prompted by a desire to attract attention to herself and boost book sales. They pointed to her shyness, her "code of honour," and her extremely modest, unassuming character. Thus, her beloved grandson, Mathew Prichard, who became head of Agatha Christie Limited after the death of his mother Rosalind, said that he did not believe the theory that she had intended to become famous by such means. He recalled that, out of delicacy, the family never discussed this period in the life of his famous grandmother, who had overcome misfortune in 1926 and, as a result, had done "strange things" at the time. He is convinced that she never intended to arouse unnatural public interest in herself or her books, since she never sought excessive publicity: "At that time she was very unhappy, and a great many people in her position would have behaved in a similar way". Rosalind, Mathew's mother, likewise always adhered to the "official" version put forward by her father after Agatha was found. According to this account, her mother "had been unwell throughout 1926 and, at some traumatic moment during the night of 3–4 December, lost her memory".

=== Reasons and hypotheses for the disappearance ===
The causes of Christie's disappearance were analysed by British psychologist Andrew Norman in his book The Finished Portrait, in which he argued, among other things, that the hypothesis of traumatic amnesia does not withstand scrutiny, since Agatha Christie's behaviour indicated otherwise. She had registered at the hotel under the surname of her husband's mistress, and spent her time playing the piano, taking spa treatments, and visiting the library. Nevertheless, having examined all the evidence, Norman concluded that what had occurred was a dissociative fugue brought on by a severe mental disturbance. Lord Ritchie-Calder, an acquaintance of Christie's who may have seen her at the hotel on December 14, 1926, described her condition as follows: "Emotional disturbance — yes. Amnesia — no". Bouchardeau assessed Agatha's behaviour during this period as "depressive," in her view caused by emotional exhaustion amid difficult life circumstances. According to some theories, the writer's disappearance was connected with her literary work — either mulling over the plot of a new book or a wish to draw public attention to her writing. Morgan, the author of the authorized biography, dismissed such explanations of Christie's motives as inconsistent with her working methods as a writer and strikingly at odds with her modest and shy character. She expressed the view that 1926, the year The Murder of Roger Ackroyd was published, marked a turning point in Christie's work, and described the resulting furor with these words:

People who lived through the twenties and thirties later recalled the disputes surrounding this book — whether the author had truly laid out all the clues before the reader impartially — but their memories were constantly intermingled with the memory of the great public scandal that Agatha caused that same year.

Tsimbaeva rejects the widespread view that the runaway was driven by a desire to punish her husband, even to the point of bringing upon him an accusation of her "murder." She believes this is in no way consistent with Agatha's character and upbringing: "It's inconceivable, because it's simply not sporting". Morgan suggested that Agatha, in a depressed state over her family troubles, "hounded and driven to the depths of despair," "instinctively took flight," but was not contemplating suicide. In her view, despite the press's close attention, it is impossible to fully reconstruct the course of events on December 3. The psychiatrist who examined Agatha believed she had suffered a concussion, and she herself recalled that her face had been cut and bloodied. The maid who attended her at the hotel stated that "Mrs Neele" covered her forehead each morning until she had done her hair. Morgan concluded that the writer's chills and state of shock had been caused by the effects of a head injury sustained in the car accident. Although Agatha did indeed feel deeply wounded by her husband's behaviour and his "dishonourable" conduct, Morgan maintained that Agatha's actions could hardly have been driven by deliberate revenge against her husband, since the car ended up in a ditch as the result of a mechanical failure, after which the runaway ended up at the hotel in Harrogate, most likely unwittingly, by chance. Cade commented on Morgan's version, as set out in her biography of Christie, saying that she "lifts the decorous veil over the mysterious disappearance, placing most of the blame for what happened on an intrusive press".

In 1996, Jared Cade's book Agatha Christie and the Eleven Missing Days was published, based on an account of events told to the author by Judith, the daughter of the writer's friend Nan Kon. During the famous disappearance, Judith was only ten years old, and she related this version of the story as told to her by her mother, who supposedly helped Agatha carry out her plan of revenge against Archie. On the night of her flight, at 9:45 p.m., the writer drove to Newlands Corner, pushed the car off the hill there, walked to West Clandon station in Surrey, and boarded a train bound for London. There she spent the night at Nan's home in Chelsea, and the two of them discussed their plan once more. In the morning they found out that rooms were available in Harrogate, and Agatha set off for the Swan Hydropathic Hotel without booking a room in advance, which was meant to lend greater credibility to the account of her having lost her memory. Laura Thompson disagrees with this interpretation of events; in her book Agatha Christie: An English Mystery, she points to inconsistencies in the timing, train schedules, the character of the terrain, the psychological aspects, and so on, in this version.

Thompson also criticizes the "official" version supported by the family and the Agatha Christie Trust, but finds in it some rational psychological elements. She believes that the account put forward by Archie was not advanced out of "base" motives, nor to conceal the true state of affairs, but in order to "protect a weak woman experiencing immense suffering, too complex to be encompassed by any coherent theory." She also believes that, in that case, these family claims are closer to the truth than speculation about calculated "tricks" and "schemes": "It takes into account that Agatha was in a state of nervous breakdown, that overlapping events — the death of her beloved mother and her husband's betrayal — brought her to the edge of the abyss. But did not take her over it". Thompson also disagrees with the family's traditional version of that situation, criticizing its untenability and its contradiction of the facts. In her assessment, it is impossible to suffer from amnesia and then recover from it without a trace within two weeks. The French writer Frédéric Beigbeder remarked figuratively on the famous disappearance, observing that the "mysterious lady," after publishing The Murder of Roger Ackroyd, felt that she had "overreached" herself slightly in it: "Novelists cannot stand lulling readers to sleep by writing their puzzle-books. Agatha Christie decided to become one of these puzzles herself, proving to us once again what a dangerous game literature is".

== Representations in culture ==
=== In the writer's work ===
One of the many theories attempting to explain Agatha's actions in December 1926 holds that she left home because she was supposedly working out the plot of her next book. Despite the speculative nature of this interpretation, many researchers nevertheless believe that the disappearance and her subsequent evasive behaviour, avoiding any mention of this episode, were indeed reflected in her work. Laura Thompson called these events in Agatha's life her best "story," since it cannot be understood in a single correct way, and people who try to "solve" it, thereby destroying its "beauty," will invariably fail. In Cade's view, what happened led her to sublimate the experience in her books. He concluded that the mystery surrounding the most famous events of her life continues to attract attention because it bears directly on her literary work: "What is known amounts to a gripping story of a woman driven to the depths of despair by the torment inflicted on her, a woman who came back to become one of the best-loved storytellers of the twentieth century". Tsimbaeva holds a similar view. In particular, she emphasized that the stressful situation the novelist found herself in during the final stage of her first marriage strengthened her resilience and spurred her on to further professional achievements.

Maya Tugusheva concluded that her husband's infidelity spoiled Agatha's life for a long time, and that, in connection with these events, "shameless scheming homewreckers" began to appear in her subsequent books. However, as Tsimbaeva noted, the detective novelist apparently had nothing against the surname Neele itself, since the novel A Pocket Full of Rye (1953) features a "likeable" Inspector Neele. Morgan emphasized that the features of Christie's reserved character, in particular her tendency to bear hardships in solitude, were vividly expressed in the writer's work, which eased her life's difficulties:

Agatha's grief was always silent, whether it was Archie's betrayal, Clara's death, the divorce, the miscarriage, or her son-in-law's death — she simply withdrew into herself, showing her emotions to no one; only in her books did she give free rein to her feelings — in the novels signed under the pen name Mary Westmacott, in plays, and in detective stories. But even in her works, she expresses emotion rather restrainedly.

The fact that the Christies' difficult marital relationship was reflected in Agatha's work had already been noted with regard to the story The Cornish Mystery, published in 1923. In its plot, a woman who suspects her husband is trying to poison her approaches Poirot. In February 1927, Christie's story The Edge was published, accompanied by a note stating that it had been written just before the writer's "illness" and disappearance. It tells of a woman in love who accidentally learns her rival's secret and wants to have the married man for herself by getting rid of her. Scholars note undeniable autobiographical features in the work, reflecting the author's deep personal feelings. In the standalone novel Giant's Bread, published in 1930 under the pen name Mary Westmacott, the twists of the divorce proceedings and the feelings they aroused are apparently presented from the author's own point of view. In her other "pseudonymous" semi-autobiographical novel, Unfinished Portrait. Christie described events resembling her own disappearance. The book contains many autobiographical motifs, and its central heroine, Celia, resembles the author in character and behaviour. However, the degree of reality reflected on the pages of the book can hardly be established with any precision, and it seems the author herself tried to avoid this, so as not to hurt other people's feelings. According to some literary scholars, the fictional account given in the novel of several years of life following Christie's much-publicized divorce reflects certain real circumstances. In it, she "recreates a portrait of herself, perhaps trying to understand herself and her own actions". Mallowan, after reading her Autobiography, wrote that the image of the heroine Celia in the novel is "perhaps the most accurate portrait of Agatha herself".

It is believed that some facts and experiences of the writer connected with these events were reflected in the novel The A.B.C. Murders (1936), particularly with regard to the intrusive journalists interested in high-profile, sensational cases. Bouchardeau cited several examples illustrating, in her view, the author's dislike not only of reporters but also of doctors, and psychiatrists in particular, whom Agatha was forced to deal with in 1927 — Peril at End House (1932) and Death in the Clouds (1935). However, the French biographer did not treat this observation as absolute, suggesting that the negative portrayal of doctors might conceal a literary game on a "second level". Researchers also see a similarity between the life crises Agatha experienced and her novel Five Little Pigs (1942), which portrays the anguish of a wife over her husband's infidelity. In the book's plot, Hercule Poirot is approached by a young woman, Carla Lemarchant, whose mother had been convicted sixteen years earlier of murdering her husband, Carla's father. Before her death sixteen years before, the mother had written Carla a letter proclaiming her innocence — the daughter insists her mother would never have lied to her to cover up an unpleasant truth. It is also noted that, since the novel was written and published in 1942, the sixteen-year time reference may point to 1926, the year of the writer's famous disappearance, despite the dissimilarity between the real situation and the novel's plot, in which the husband loves his wife despite her numerous infidelities. According to research by Richard Calder, the widespread public reaction connected with the search for Agatha was primarily due to the inadequate actions of the police and the press. This interpretation finds literary reflection in the book, both in the organization of the search by Superintendent Kenward and in the presence of widespread public attention.

Cade suggested that autobiographical motifs are also reflected in Christie-Westmacott's first non-detective novel, Giant's Bread (1930). Holmes, however, categorically disagrees with this position, insisting that the three main characters in this book cannot be correlated with the love triangle that occurred during Christie's first marriage, and that the characters (Vernon, Nell, Jane) do not correspond to Archie, Agatha, and Nancy. Holmes pointed to a similarity between the plotline and Christie's own fate in the novel The Mystery of the Blue Train. Here, in the biographer's view, Christie's views on marriage, divorce, and infidelity are reflected: "Adultery cannot last forever; it ends either in the lovers' separation (which is what she dreamed of) or in divorce and remarriage (which is what Archie insisted on), but the wounds inflicted by betrayal and infidelity do not heal".

According to Tsimbaeva's suggestion, in the novel Towards Zero (1944), Agatha turned, to some extent, to an assessment of how the society circles to which she and Archie belonged judged their divorce proceedings. Above all, this concerns the reputational harm done to her first husband and, correspondingly, to the novel's hero: "…imagine the atmosphere of universal condemnation surrounding a divorced man, and this concerning a wealthy amateur sportsman, not a businessman seeking to make a career in the City". It has also been suggested in the scholarly literature that there is some plot similarity between the story of the Christies' relationship and the writer's novel The Hollow, published in 1946. Notable in this connection is the scene in which the mortally wounded husband asks that his murder be concealed, so as not to harm the wife who shot him with a pistol.

=== In culture ===
Following what Cade called a "dramatic" discovery, Agatha became a target for cartoonists, comedians, journalists, and ordinary people alike. Members of a music-hall troupe called The Merry Cadets reworked the popular song Grandfather's Whiskers into a parody referencing details of the writer's disappearance:

Grandpa has bushy sideburns and a thick beard!

But neither scissors nor a razor have ever touched them.

Mrs. Christie, when you disappeared, what hid you back then?

Grandpa's sideburns and his thick beard!

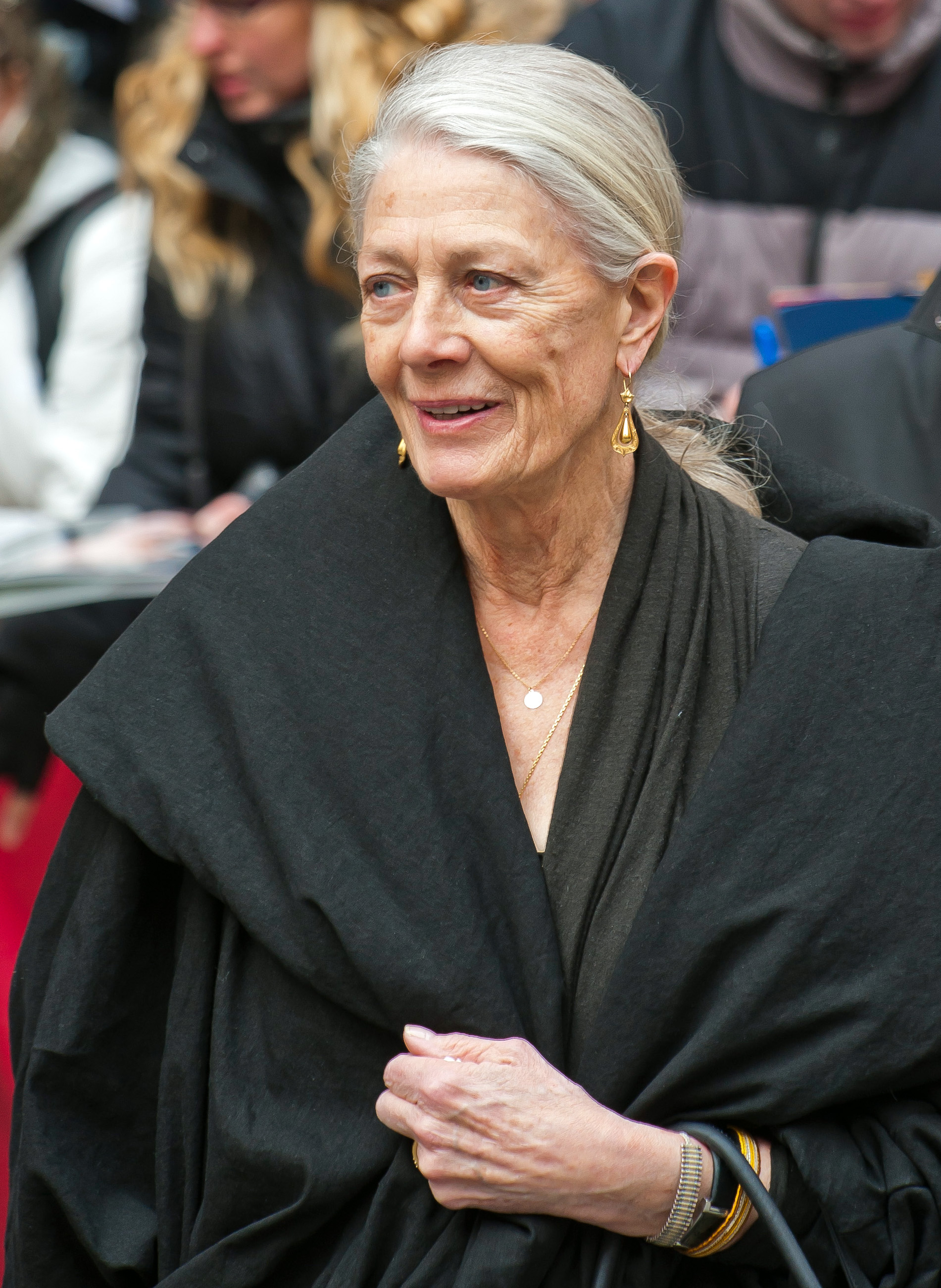
Vanessa Redgrave, who played Christie in the film Agatha

Dorothy Sayers, by artistic means, reflected some of the circumstances of her fellow crime writer's disappearance in her detective novel Unnatural Death (1927). The dramatic events of Christie's biography are the subject of a novel by journalist and writer Kathleen Tynan — Agatha (1977). Its film adaptation of the same name, released in 1989, was directed by British director Michael Apted; the leading roles were played by Vanessa Redgrave (Agatha Christie), Timothy Dalton (Archibald Christie), and Dustin Hoffman (Wally Stanton). In the plot of both the novel and the film, Christie cannot accept that her husband has left her for his mistress. She attempts suicide, intending to arrange matters so that suspicion falls on her rival. However, at the very last moment she abandons her plan and decides to agree to a divorce. Because of this particular interpretation of events, the family attempted to prevent the film's release. In 1977, the writer's daughter Rosalind wrote in The Times: she wished to make clear that the film, made without consulting any representatives of her parents' families, went against their wishes and would cause them great distress. In 1978, Rosalind and the Agatha Christie Trust filed suits seeking to ban the film's release, but a federal judge refused.

The writer's disappearance is addressed in the seventh episode of the fourth series of the revived British science fiction series Doctor Who, which premiered on May 17, 2008, on BBC One. The episode The Unicorn and the Wasp is set in December 1926, when the Doctor and Donna Noble find themselves at an English country house where mysterious murders occur in the style of an Agatha Christie mystery, which Christie herself helps to solve. The episode's writers resolve the mystery of the master detective's disappearance in a comedic vein: the crimes are committed by a giant alien wasp influenced by the novel The Murder of Roger Ackroyd, but Agatha loses her memory after her encounter with the culprit. In 2017, British writer Andrew Wilson published the novel A Talent for Murder, the first in his series of books devoted to investigations conducted by Christie herself.

In December 2018, the premiere took place of the British television film Agatha and the Truth of Murder, starring Irish actress Ruth Bradley in the lead role. The events take place in December 1926: Christie is in a creative crisis, exhausted from working on a novel, and, to make matters worse, her husband insists on a divorce because of an affair with a young woman. A nurse approaches the writer asking her to investigate the death of her godmother's namesake, Florence Nightingale, who was brutally murdered on a train. Agatha reluctantly agrees and, after studying the case materials, begins her investigation. She changes her appearance and, disguised as Mary Westmacott, gathers the suspects at the victim's house. On her way there she is delayed, and the press presents her two-day forced absence as a mysterious disappearance. After a murder occurs at the house, Inspector Dicks arrives and complains that, because of Agatha Christie's disappearance, police resources have been diverted to searching for her and there is a shortage of staff. He begins to realize that "Westmacott" is in fact the missing Christie everyone is searching for. Nevertheless, the two manage to find common ground and expose the culprits. Dicks then promises to help corroborate her account of a car accident and memory loss, which is meant to explain Agatha's disappearance to the public.

In 2015, it was announced that American screenwriter Annie Neal was working on a rewrite of the Agatha screenplay by Allison Schroeder, which had been acquired in 2013 by Paramount Pictures. The project was to offer a free adaptation of the events of Christie's disappearance, but its production was delayed. In May 2026, the company Fortitude International announced its intention to make the film Eleven Missing Days, about Christie's disappearance. The screenplay was based on Jared Cade's book Agatha Christie and the Eleven Missing Days. Filming began in June of that year.

== Bibliography ==
=== In Russian ===
- Beigbeder, Frédéric (2006) [Dernier inventaire avant liquidation]. "№49. Агата Кристи. «Убийство Роджера Экройда» (1926)" [No. 49. Agatha Christie. "The Murder of Roger Ackroyd" (1926)]. Лучшие книги XX века. Последняя опись перед распродажей [The Best Books of the 20th Century: Last Inventory Before Liquidation] (in Russian). Translated by Volevich, I. Moscow: FreeFly. pp. 20–23. ISBN 5-98358-064-7.
- Bogatyryov, A. V. (2021). Энциклопедия Эркюля Пуаро [The Encyclopedia of Hercule Poirot] (in Russian). Moscow: Pero. ISBN 978-5-00189-026-3.
- Bouchardeau, Huguette (2001). Агата Кристи как она есть [Agatha Christie as She Is]. Сквозь призму времени. Биографии (in Russian). Translated by Vasilyeva, A. A. Moscow: Raduga. ISBN 978-5-05-005114-1.
- Cade, Jared (2012). Агата Кристи. 11 дней отсутствия [Agatha Christie: 11 Missing Days] (in Russian). Moscow: Ripol Klassik. ISBN 978-5-386-04081-9.
- Kireyeva, N. V.; Kovalenko, I. A. (2015). "Путь Агаты Кристи к успеху: социокультурные, биографические и жанровые аспекты" [Agatha Christie's Path to Success: Sociocultural, Biographical and Genre Aspects]. Известия Самарского Научного Центра Российской Академии Наук [Proceedings of the Samara Scientific Center of the Russian Academy of Sciences] (in Russian). 17 (1 (5)): 1147–1151.
- Mallowan, Max (2019). Агата и археолог: мемуары мужа Агаты Кристи [Agatha and the Archaeologist: Memoirs of Agatha Christie's Husband] (in Russian). Translated by Tsyurupa, M. Moscow: Eksmo. ISBN 978-5-04-100204-6.
- Christie, Agatha (1994). "Собрание сочинений в 20 томах". Немой свидетель [Dumb Witness] (in Russian). Vol. 7. Translated by Titov, A. Moscow: Artikul. pp. 195–436. ISBN 5-87891-018-7.
- Christie, Agatha (2003). "Собрание сочинений". Автобиография [An Autobiography] (in Russian). Vol. 27, book 1. Translated by Titov, A. Moscow: Artikul-print. ISBN 5-93776-029-8.
- Christie, Agatha (2002). "Собрание сочинений". Библиографическая справка [Bibliographic Note] (in Russian). Vol. 26. Translated by Titov, A. Moscow: Artikul-print. p. 607. ISBN 5-93776-019-0.
- Christie, Agatha; Curran, John (2010). Секретный архив Агаты Кристи [Agatha Christie's Secret Archive] (in Russian). Moscow: Eksmo. ISBN 978-5-699-42753-6.
- Miller, Russell (2012). Приключения Конан Дойла [The Adventures of Conan Doyle]. Персона (in Russian). Translated by Gurbanovskaya, L. Moscow: KoLibri, Azbuka-Attikus. ISBN 978-5-389-03104-3.
- Morgan, Janet (2002). "Агата Кристи. Собрание сочинений". Жизнь Дамы Агаты: Биография [The Life of Dame Agatha: A Biography] (in Russian). Vol. 27, book 2. Moscow: Artikul-print. ISBN 5-93776-026-3.
- Pernatyev, Yuri (2021). Агата Кристи [Agatha Christie]. Женщина-миф (in Russian). Kharkiv: Knizhny Klub «Klub Semeynogo Dosuga». ISBN 978-617-12-8836-2.
- Titov, A. (2000). "Собрание сочинений". Агата Кристи. Библиографическая справка [Agatha Christie: A Bibliographic Note] (in Russian). Vol. 22. Moscow: Artikul-print. pp. 682–683. ISBN 5-93776-002-6.
- Thompson, Laura (2010). Агата Кристи: Английская тайна [Agatha Christie: An English Mystery] (in Russian). Moscow: AST, Astrel, Poligrafizdat. ISBN 978-5-17-064397-4.
- Tugusheva, M. P. (1991). "Под знаком четырёх. О судьбе произведений Э. По, А. К. Дойла, А. Кристи, Ж. Сименона". Опасный мир Агаты Кристи [The Dangerous World of Agatha Christie] (in Russian). Moscow: Kniga. pp. 149–209. ISBN 5-212-00416-0.
- Holmes, Dorothea (2013). Агата Кристи. Она написала убийство [Agatha Christie: She Wrote Murder]. Женщина, покорившая мир (in Russian). Moscow: Algoritm. ISBN 978-5-4438-0477-4.
- Hack, Richard (2011). "Герцогиня смерти" [The Duchess of Death]. Глава четвёртая. Сочинительница детективов [Chapter Four: The Mystery Writer] (in Russian). Translated by Makarov, M. Moscow: KoLibri. ISBN 978-5-389-01898-3.
- Tsimbaeva, E. N. (2013). Агата Кристи [Agatha Christie]. Zhizn Zamechatelnykh Lyudei. Small Series; issue 44 (in Russian). Moscow: Molodaya Gvardiya. ISBN 978-5-235-03600-0.

=== In English ===
- Christie, Agatha (2010). An Autobuiography [An Autobiography] (PDF). HarperCollins e-books. Australia: HarperCollins Publishers. ISBN 978-0-06-200659-2.
- Mallowan, Max (1977). Mallowan's Memoirs: Agatha and the Archaeologist. London: Harper Collins Publishers. ISBN 978-0007117048.
- Tynan, Kathleen (1979). Agatha. New York: Ballantine Books. ISBN 978-0345275868.
- Westmacott, Mary (1934). Unfinished Portrait. London: William Collins & Sons.
