= The Outsider (play) =

1923 play

- Original language: English
- Written by: Dorothy Brandon
- Genre: Medical drama
- Setting: London

Premiere
- Date: 30 April 1923
- Place: Pleasure Gardens Theatre, Folkestone; St James's Theatre, London (West End)

The Outsider is a play by the British writer Dorothy Brandon. It portrays the struggle of an unorthodox medical practitioner to gain acceptance by the medical establishment. It was subsequently revised to show the unconventional triumphing over the conventional, whereas the play had originally had the opposite ending.

It premiered at the Pleasure Gardens Theatre in Folkestone in April 1923, before transferring to the St James's Theatre for a West End run lasting for 107 performances between May and September the same year. The cast included Leslie Faber, Charles Kenyon and Isobel Elsom. A New York run in 1924 played at the 49th Street Theatre, produced by William Harris Jr. The cast included Lionel Atwill as Anton, Katharine Cornell as Lalage, Fernanda Eliscu as Madame Klost, Whitford Kane as Frederick and Pat Somerset as Basil.

It has had a number of revivals. In 1931 a run at London's Apollo Theatre lasted for 66 performances. The cast featured Harold Huth in the title role along with Annie Esmond and Sebastian Shaw. Isobel Elsom reprised her role from the original production.

== Adaptations ==
It has been turned into films on three occasions. A 1926 American silent film The Outsider directed by Rowland V. Lee, a 1931 British film The Outsider directed by Harry Lachman and a 1939 British film The Outsider directed by Paul L. Stein with George Sanders in the title role.

== Bibliography ==
- Goble, Alan. The Complete Index to Literary Sources in Film. Walter de Gruyter, 1999.
- Wearing, J. P. The London Stage 1920-1929: A Calendar of Productions, Performers, and Personnel. Rowman & Littlefield, 2014.
- Wearing, J. P. The London Stage 1930–1939: A Calendar of Productions, Performers, and Personnel. Rowman & Littlefield, 2014.
