= The Days of My Life =

1925 autobiography by H. Rider Haggard

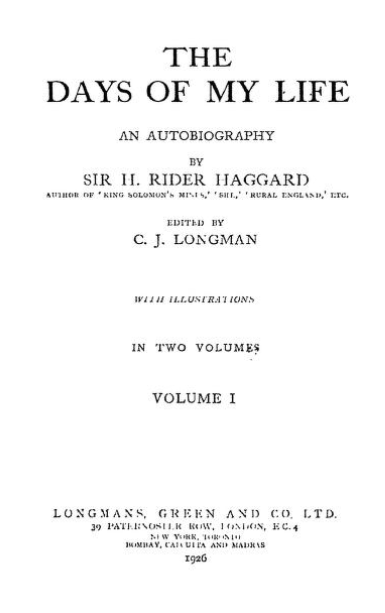
- Title page for The Days of My Life (1926)
- Author: H. Rider Haggard
- Language: English
- Publication date: 1925
- Publication place: United Kingdom

The Days of My Life is an autobiography of H. Rider Haggard.

He wrote it in 1910–12 but did not publish it until his death – he made express allowance for this in his will.

Chapter XXIII, A Note on Religion, was published separately by Longmans, Green & Co. in 1927.
