= Barbara on Her Own =

1926 novel

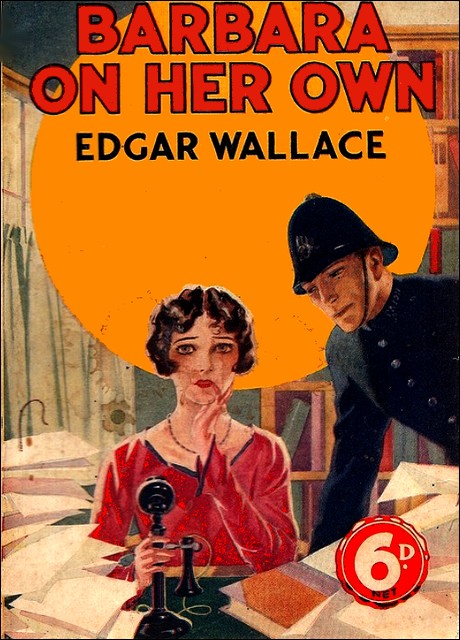
- First edition
- Author: Edgar Wallace
- Language: English
- Genre: Mystery
- Publisher: George Newnes Ltd
- Publication date: 1926
- Publication place: United Kingdom
- Media type: Print

Barbara on Her Own is a 1926 mystery novel by the British writer Edgar Wallace.

== Plot ==
The owner of a struggling department store is found dead, shortly before a controversial takeover. Barbara, his goddaughter and secretary, is suspected by the police of murder.

== Bibliography ==
- Clark, Neil. Stranger than Fiction: The Life of Edgar Wallace, the Man Who Created King Kong. Stroud, Gloucestershire: The History Press, 2015.
