= Blind Alley (play) =

1926 play

- Written by: Dorothy Brandon
- Original language: English
- Genre: Drama

Premiere
- Date premiered: 1 April 1926
- Place premiered: Pleasure Gardens Theatre, Folkestone

Blind Alley is a 1926 play by the British author Dorothy Brandon. It is a drama about an unhappily married woman who begins to develop feelings for an actor.

It premiered at the Pleasure Gardens Theatre in Folkestone, as had her previous hit play The Outsider, before transferring to the Playhouse Theatre in London's West End. However, it was considerably less successful than her earlier works and ran for only thirteen performances. The cast included Elissa Landi, Sam Livesey and Annie Esmond.
