= The World of William Clissold =

1926 novel by H. G. Wells

The World of William Clissold: A Novel at a New Angle
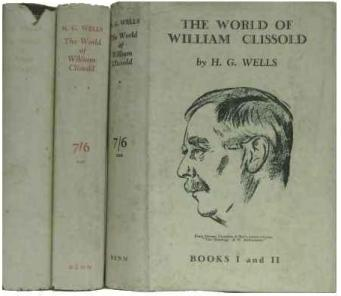
- First edition with Rothenstein drawing for vols 1, 3
- Author: H. G. Wells
- Cover artist: William Rothenstein (vols. 1, 3); David Low (vol. 2)
- Language: English
- Publisher: Benn Brothers
- Publication date: 1926
- Publication place: United Kingdom
- Pages: 797

The World of William Clissold is a 1926 novel by H. G. Wells published initially in three volumes. The first volume was published in September to coincide with Wells's sixtieth birthday, and the second and third volumes followed at monthly intervals.

== Plot summary ==
As its subtitle suggests, The World of William Clissold is not a conventional novel. Only slightly more than half its pages are devoted to events in the eponymous protagonist's life; the others are devoted to extended discussions of general ideas, "everything as it is reflected in my brain."

The World of William Clissold is written in the first person, except for a "Note before the Title Page" by Wells and an "Epilogue" by William Clissold's brother, Dickon. The rest of the novel is divided into six books.

In "Book the First: The Frame of the Picture" William Clissold describes his general worldview, describing his loss of religious faith and view of human life as "The Adventure of Mankind;" this part includes a description of a meeting with Carl Gustav Jung, whom Wells had met in 1924. The first part of this book is said to have been written in his brother's London abode; the second part is in William Clissold's house in Provence. "Book the Second: The Story of the Clissolds—My Father and the Flow of Things" recounts the upbringing of William Clissold and his brother Dickon, which was violently disrupted by the suicide of their businessman father, Richard Clissold, after he was convicted and sentenced to prison for fraud; it includes long passages on "systems in history," the ideas of Karl Marx, and the development of the institution of money. "Book the Third: The Story of the Clissolds—Essence of Dickon" tells the story of his brother's family life and innovative career in advertising, and includes extensive commentary on the historical importance of World War I.

"Book the Fourth: The Story of the Clissolds—Tangle of Desires" focuses on William Clissold's love life, telling the story of his unsuccessful marriage to Clara and his affairs with Sirrie Evans and with Helen, a famous actress, and culminates in his meeting Clementina, a young Scotch-Greek woman who becomes the final love of his life. "Book the Fifth: The Story of the Clissolds—The Next Phase" is almost exclusively devoted to developing the notion of a worldwide "open conspiracy" of business leaders, politicians, scientists, and intellectuals to establish a "World Republic" devoted to the betterment of human life (a dominant notion in Wells's later life that is developed at length here for the first time). "Book the Sixth: The Story of the Clissolds—Venus as Evening Star" is an extended analysis of the relations between men and women, and culminates in his decision to marry Clementina. But as the epilogue recounts, the death of William Clissold and Clementina a few days later, on 24 Apr 1926, in an automobile accident, prevents the realisation of William Clissold's plans.

== Criticism ==
At 797 pages, The World of William Clissold is H. G. Wells's longest novel. It is dedicated to Odette Keun, Wells's lover from 1924 to 1933 and with whom Wells lived in Lou Pidou, a house they built together in Grasse, France; the text often evokes the countryside of southern France.

Wells received a £3000 advance for the novel, and Benn spent £1500 advertising it. The novel received more than a hundred reviews and was a commercial success. But critical reactions to the work were often negative and sometimes scathing, though John Maynard Keynes, George Bernard Shaw, Graham Wallas, and H.L. Mencken were appreciative. Few took the novel seriously as a work of art, seeing it instead as an exposition of "Wellsian philosophy."

Biographer David Smith called The World of William Clissold "a watershed book in H. G. Wells's fiction," marking a turn to increasingly didactive narratives.
