= Dorothy Brandon =

British playwright

Dorothy Brandon was a British playwright active in the interwar years. Her greatest West End success was the 1923 medical drama The Outsider which was revived several times, and adapted into films on three occasions.

An earlier hit was 1917's Wild Heather which ran at the Strand Theatre for 79 performances. It was also made into a film. A 1926 play Blind Alley was less successful, running for thirteen performances.

== Selected plays ==
- Wild Heather (1917)
- Araminta Arrives (1921)
- The Outsider (1923)
- Blind Alley (1926)

== Bibliography ==
- Gale, Maggie. West End Women: Women and the London Stage 1918 - 1962. Routledge, 2008.
- Goble, Alan. The Complete Index to Literary Sources in Film. Walter de Gruyter, 1999.
- Wearing, J. P. The London Stage 1920-1929: A Calendar of Productions, Performers, and Personnel. Rowman & Littlefield, 2014.
