= List of British films before 1920 =

List of British films from 1888 to 1919:

== 1888–1913 ==
Title	Director	Cast	Genre	Notes
1888
Roundhay Garden Scene	Louis Le Prince	Adolphe Le Prince, Sarah Whitley, Joseph Whitley	Live action	The world's earliest surviving film
1889
Leisurely Pedestrians, Open Topped Buses and Hansom Cabs with Trotting Horses	William Friese-Greene		Live action	
1890
London's Trafalgar Square	Wordsworth Donisthorpe		Live action	10 frames only, believed never shown publicly
1895
The Clown Barber	James Williamson		Comedy	
The Derby	Birt Acres		Documentary	A silent film of that year's Derby
Opening of the Kiel Canal	Birt Acres		Documentary	
The Oxford and Cambridge University Boat Race	Birt Acres		Documentary	A silent film of that year's race
Rough Sea at Dover	Birt Acres; Robert W. Paul		Documentary	
1896
Breakers				
A Sea Cave Near Lisbon	R.W. Paul		Documentary	
Rocky Shore				
A Soldier's Courtship	R.W. Paul		Drama	
Barnet Horse Fair	Robert W. Paul		Documentary	
The Boxing Kangaroo	Birt Acres		Documentary	
Boxing Match; or, Glove Contest	Birt Acres		Documentary	
1897
Women Fetching Water from the Nile	R.W. Paul			
Weary Willie	G.A. Smith			
Tipsy-Topsy-Turvy	G.A. Smith			
The Sign Writer				
Nursing the Baby				
Making Sausages				
The Maid in the Garden				
The Haunted Castle				
Hanging Out the Clothes				
Gymnastics - Indian Club Performer				
Comic Shaving				
Comic Face				aka Man Drinking (UK)
Children Paddling at the Seaside				
The X-Rays				
1898
Come Along, Do!				
Waves and Spray				
The Runaway Knock				
A Practical Joke				
The Policeman, the Cook and the Copper				
Photographing a Ghost	George Albert Smith		Horror	
The Miller and the Sweep	George Albert Smith		Comedy	
The Mesmerist				
The Lady Barber				
Faust and Mephistopheles			Horror	
The Corsican Brothers				
Cinderella				
Animated Clown Portrait				
Ally Sloper				
1899
Major Wilson's Last Stand			War	Studio: Levi, Jones & Company. Based on the historical events of the Shangani Patrol (1893)
The Visit of Santa Claus				
The Legacy				
The Kiss in the Tunnel	George Albert Smith			
A Good Joke				
Aladdin and the Wonderful Lamp				
The Haunted Curiosity Shop	Walter R. Booth		Horror	
The Miser's Doom	Walter R. Booth		Horror	
1900
A Wreck in a Gale	unknown		short; documentary	
As Seen Through a Telescope	George Albert Smith		Short	
The Beggar's Deceit	Cecil Hepworth			
Explosion of a Motor Car	Cecil Hepworth			
Grandma's Reading Glass	George Albert Smith	none	Drama	One minute film
A Railway Collision	Walter R. Booth	none	Drama	22 secs film
1901
Scrooge; or, Marley's Ghost	Walter R. Booth	none	Short	11 minutes long (5 minutes surviving)
The Death of Poor Joe	George Albert Smith			
1903
A Daring Daylight Burglary	Frank Mottershaw			
Alice in Wonderland	Cecil Hepworth	May Clark		8 minutes long
Desperate Poaching Affray	William Haggar	Will Haggar Jr.	Chase	3 minutes long
Mary Jane's Mishap	George Albert Smith			
Sick Kitten	George Albert Smith			
1905
Baby's Toilet	Cecil Hepworth		Documentary	3 minutes long
Rescued by Rover	Cecil Hepworth	Mabel Clark, Sebastian Smith	Drama	6 minutes long
1906
Flying the Foam and Some Fancy Diving	James Williamson	James Williamson	short comedy	
The '?' Motorist	Walter R. Booth		short comedy	
1907
Ben Hur	Sidney Olcott	Herman Rottger, William S. Hart	Historical	15 minutes long
The Sleigh Belle	Sidney Olcott			
1908
A Visit to the Seaside	George Albert Smith			
1909
The Airship Destroyer	Walter R. Booth		Science fiction	
1910
The Blue Bird	Unknown	Pauline Gilmer, Olive Walter	Comedy	
1911
The Aerial Anarchists	Walter Booth		Science fiction	
A Primitive Man's Career to Civilization	Cherry Kearton		Drama	
Princess Clementina	William G.B. Barker	H.B. Irving, Alice Young, Dorothea Baird	Adventure	
1912
Oliver Twist	Thomas Bentley	Alma Taylor, Harry Royston	Drama	
With Our King and Queen Through India			Documentary	
1913
Adrift on Life's Tide	Warwick Buckland	Alma Taylor, Flora Morris, Harry Royston	Drama	
David Copperfield	Thomas Bentley	Reginald Sheffield, Alma Taylor	Drama	
David Garrick	Leedham Bantock	Seymour Hicks, Ellaline Terriss, William Lugg	Historical	
East Lynne	Bert Haldane	Blanche Forsythe, Fred Paul, Fred Morgan	Drama	
The Forsaken	Warwick Buckland	Flora Morris, Harry Royston	Crime	
Greater Love Hath No Man	Alexander Butler	Blanche Forsythe, Fred Paul	Drama	
Hamlet	Hay Plumb	Johnston Forbes-Robertson, Gertrude Elliott	Drama	
The Harper Mystery	Laurence Trimble	Florence Turner, Frank Tennant	Drama	
The House of Temperley	Harold M. Shaw	Charles Maude, Ben Webster	Drama	
In the Hands of London Crooks	Alexander Butler	Thomas H. MacDonald, Blanche Forsythe, Fred Paul	Crime	
Ivanhoe	Leedham Bantock	Lauderdale Maitland, Hubert Carter	Historical	
Kissing Cup	Jack Hulcup	Harry Gilbey, Chrissie White, Cecil Mannering	Sports	
Maria Marten, or the Mystery of the Red Barn	Maurice Elvey	Elizabeth Risdon, Fred Groves	Drama	
A Message from Mars	J. Wallett Waller	Charles Hawtrey, E. Holman Clark	Sci-fi	
A Midnight Adventure	Frank Wilson	Alma Taylor, Jack Raymond, Harry Royston	Drama	
One Fair Daughter	Warwick Buckland	Alice De Winton, Chrissie White, Jamie Darling	Drama	
Popsy Wopsy	Maurice Elvey	Fred Groves		
Scrooge	Leedham Bantock	Seymour Hicks, William Lugg	Drama	
A Throw of the Dice	Frank Wilson	Alice De Winton, Harry Royston, Stewart Rome	Drama	
The Vicar of Wakefield	Frank Wilson	Chrissie White, Violet Hopson, Harry Royston	Drama	

== 1914 ==
Title	Director	Cast	Genre	Notes
Beauty and the Barge	Harold M. Shaw	Cyril Maude, Lillian Logan, Gregory Scott, Mary Brough	Comedy	
The Black Spot	George Loane Tucker	Jane Gail, Gerald Ames	Crime	
The Bosun's Mate	Harold M. Shaw	Mary Brough, Charles Rock; Wyndham Guise	Comedy	
The Brass Bottle	Sidney Morgan	Doris Lytton, E. Holman Clark, Mary Brough	Fantasy	
By Whose Hand?	Warwick Buckland	Alma Taylor, Lionelle Howard, Stewart Rome	Crime	
Called Back	George Loane Tucker	Henry Ainley, Jane Gail, Charles Rock	Crime	
The Chimes	Thomas Bentley	Stewart Rome, Violet Hopson, Warwick Buckland	Drama	
A Christmas Carol	Harold M. Shaw	George Bellamy, Charles Rock, Edna Flugrath	Drama	
Creatures of Clay	Frank Wilson	Alice De Winton, Stewart Rome, Jack Raymond	Crime	
The Cry of the Captive	Frank Wilson	Stewart Rome, Violet Hopson, James Lindsay	Drama	
The Cup Final Mystery	Maurice Elvey	Elisabeth Risdon, Fred Groves, Joan Morgan	Sports	
The Difficult Way	George Loane Tucker	Jane Gail, Gerald Ames, Langhorn Burton	Drama	
England Expects	George Loane Tucker	Jane Gail, Charles Rock, George Bellamy	Drama	
England's Menace	Harold M. Shaw	Edna Flugrath, Gerald Ames	War drama	
Enoch Arden	Percy Nash	Gerald Lawrence, Fay Davis, Ben Webster	Drama	
Eugene Aram	Edwin J. Collins	Jack Leigh, Lionel d'Aragon	Historical	
For Her People	Laurence Trimble	Florence Turner, Rex Davis	Drama	
The Girl Who Lived in Straight Street	Warwick Buckland	Stewart Rome, Alma Taylor, Chrissie White	Drama	
The Harbour Lights	Percy Nash	Gerald Lawrence, Mercy Hatton, Daisy Cordell	Drama	
The Heart of Midlothian	Frank Wilson	Flora Morris, Violet Hopson, Alma Taylor, Stewart Rome	Historical	
Her Luck in London	Maurice Elvey	A.V. Bramble, Fred Groves	Drama	
The Idol of Paris	Maurice Elvey	Elisabeth Risdon, Fred Groves	Drama	
In the Days of Trafalgar	Maurice Elvey	Elisabeth Risdon, Fred Groves, A.V. Bramble	Historical	
In the Ranks	Percy Nash	Gregory Scott, Daisy Cordell, James Lindsay	Crime	
In the Shadow of Big Ben	Frank Wilson	Tom Powers, Alma Taylor, Jack Raymond	Thriller	
The Incomparable Bellairs	Harold M. Shaw	Edna Flugrath, Gregory Scott, Mercy Hatton	Drama	
Justice	Frank Wilson	Alec Worcester, Alma Taylor, Stewart Rome	Crime	
The King's Minister	Harold M. Shaw	Edna Flugrath, Langhorn Burton, Gerald Ames	Thriller	
The King's Romance	Ernest G. Batley	Fred Morgan, Henry Victor	Adventure	
Lawyer Quince	Harold M. Shaw	Charles Rock, Lillian Logan, Mary Brough	Comedy	
Liberty Hall	Harold M. Shaw	Ben Webster, Edna Flugrath, O.B. Clarence	Comedy	
The Life of Shakespeare	Frank R. Growcott, J.B. McDowell	Albert Ward, George Foley	Biopic	
Lights of London	Bert Haldane	Arthur Chesney, Fred Paul	Drama	
Little Lord Fauntleroy	F. Martin Thornton	Harry Agar Lyons, Jack Denton	Drama	
The Loss of the Birkenhead	Maurice Elvey	Elisabeth Risdon, Fred Groves	Historical	
The Lure of London	Bert Haldane	Ivy Close, M. Gray Murray	Drama	
The Midnight Wedding	Ernest G. Batley	George Foley, Ethyle Batley	Drama	
The Murdoch Trial	Laurence Trimble	Florence Turner, Frank Tennant	Drama	
The Old Curiosity Shop	Thomas Bentley	Warwick Buckland, Alma Taylor	Drama	
Old St. Paul's	Wilfred Noy	Lionelle Howard, Cyril Smith	Historical	
On His Majesty's Service	George Loane Tucker	Jane Gail, Douglas Munro, Gerald Ames	Thriller	
The Ring and the Rajah	Harold M. Shaw	Edna Flugrath, Edward O'Neill	Crime	
She Stoops to Conquer	George Loane Tucker	Henry Ainley, Jane Gail	Comedy	Based on the play by Oliver Goldsmith
The Shepherd Lassie of Argyle	Laurence Trimble	Florence Turner, Rex Davis	Drama	
Shopgirls	Laurence Trimble	Florence Turner, Hector Dion	Drama	
The Stress of Circumstance	Warwick Buckland	Stewart Rome, Violet Hopson, Lionelle Howard	Crime	
A Study in Scarlet	George Pearson	James Bragington, Fred Paul	Drama	First film to feature Sherlock Holmes
The Suicide Club	Maurice Elvey	Montagu Love, Elisabeth Risdon	Drama	
The Third String	George Loane Tucker	Jane Gail, Frank Stanmore, George Bellamy, Judd Green	Sports	
Through the Valley of Shadows	Laurence Trimble	Florence Turner, James Lindsay	Drama	
Trilby	Harold M. Shaw	Herbert Beerbohm Tree, Viva Birkett, Charles Rock	Drama	
The Whirr of the Spinning Wheel	Frank Wilson	Alma Taylor, Stewart Rome, Alice De Winton	Romance	
The World, the Flesh and the Devil	F. Martin Thornton	Jack Denton, Mercy Hatton	Drama	

== 1915 ==
Title	Director	Cast	Genre	Notes
Alone in London	Laurence Trimble	Florence Turner, Henry Edwards	Drama	
As Ye Repent	Laurence Trimble	Florence Turner, Tom Powers	Drama	
The Baby on the Barge	Cecil Hepworth	Alma Taylor, Stewart Rome	Drama	
Barnaby Rudge	Thomas Bentley	Tom Powers, Stewart Rome	Drama	Based on Barnaby Rudge by Charles Dickens
Be Sure Your Sins	Cecil M. Hepworth	Alma Taylor, Stewart Rome, Violet Hopson	Drama	
The Bottle	Cecil M. Hepworth	Albert Chevalier, Stewart Rome, Alma Taylor	Drama	
Brother Officers	Harold M. Shaw	Henry Ainley, Gerald Ames	War drama	
The Christian	George Loane Tucker	Derwent Hall Caine, Elisabeth Risdon	Drama	Adaptation of the novel and play by Hall Caine
Charity Ann	Maurice Elvey	Elisabeth Risdon, Fred Groves	Drama	
A Cinema Girl's Romance	George Pearson	Fred Paul, Alice De Winton	Drama	
The Coal King	Percy Nash	Daisy Cordell, Gregory Scott	Drama	
The Derby Winner	Harold M. Shaw	Edna Flugrath, Gerald Ames, Mary Dibley	Sports	
Far from the Madding Crowd	Laurence Trimble	Florence Turner, Henry Edwards, Malcolm Cherry	Drama	
Fight for the Dardanelles	Percy F. Smith		World War I documentary	
Fine Feathers	Maurice Elvey	Elisabeth Risdon, Fred Groves	Drama	
The Firm of Girdlestone	Harold M. Shaw	Edna Flugrath, Fred Groves, Charles Rock	Drama	
Five Nights	Bert Haldane	Eve Balfour, Thomas H. MacDonald, Tom Coventry	Romance	
Florence Nightingale	Maurice Elvey	Elisabeth Risdon, Fred Groves	Biopic	
Flying from Justice	Percy Nash	Gregory Scott, Douglas Payne, Joan Ritz	Crime	
From Shopgirl to Duchess	Maurice Elvey	A.V. Bramble, Pauline Peters	Drama	
The Golden Pavement	Cecil M. Hepworth	Alma Taylor, Stewart Rome, Lionelle Howard	Drama	
The Great Adventure	Laurence Trimble	Henry Ainley, Esme Hubbard	Comedy	
Hard Times	Thomas Bentley	Bransby Williams, Leon M. Lion	Drama	
The Heart of a Child	Harold M. Shaw	Edna Flugrath, Hayford Hobbs, Mary Dibley	Drama	
The Heart of Sister Ann	Harold M. Shaw	Edna Flugrath, Hayford Hobbs	Drama	
Her Boy	Frank Wilson	Stewart Rome, Violet Hopson, Lionelle Howard	Drama	
Her Nameless Child	Maurice Elvey	A.V. Bramble, Fred Groves	Drama	
Home	Maurice Elvey	Elisabeth Risdon, Fred Groves	Drama	
Honeymoon for Three	Maurice Elvey	Charles Hawtrey, Elisabeth Risdon	Comedy	
Infelice	Fred Paul	Peggy Hyland, Bertram Burleigh	Drama	
Iron Justice	Sidney Morgan	Sydney Fairbrother, Julian Royce, Alfred Drayton	Crime	
Jack Tar	Bert Haldane	Eve Balfour, Thomas H. MacDonald, Harry Royston	War	
Jane Shore	Bert Haldane, F. Martin Thornton	Blanche Forsythe, Roy Travers	Historical	
John Halifax, Gentleman	George Pearson	Fred Paul, Peggy Hyland	Drama	
The King's Outcast	Ralph Dewsbury	Gerald Ames, Charles Rock	Drama	
A Lancashire Lass	Frank Wilson	Stewart Rome, Alma Taylor, Tom Powers	Crime	
The Little Minister	Percy Nash	Joan Ritz, Gregory Scott, Henry Vibart	Romance	
Lost and Won	Laurence Trimble	Florence Turner, Henry Edwards	Drama	
Love in a Wood	Maurice Elvey	Gerald Ames, Vera Cuningham	Comedy	
The Man in the Attic	Ralph Dewsbury	Charles Rock, Philip Hewland	Crime	
A Man of His Word	George Loane Tucker	Henry Ainley, Mary Dibley, Gerald Ames	Drama	
The Man Who Stayed at Home	Cecil M. Hepworth	Dennis Eadie, Violet Hopson, Alma Taylor	Thriller	
The Man with the Scar	Frank Wilson	Stewart Rome, Chrissie White, Lionelle Howard	Crime	
Married for Money	Léon Bary	Gregory Scott, Daisy Cordell	Crime drama	
Master and Man	Percy Nash	Gregory Scott, Joan Ritz, Daisy Cordell	Drama	
The Middleman	George Loane Tucker	Albert Chevalier, Jane Gail, Gerald Ames	Adventure	
Midshipman Easy	Maurice Elvey	Elisabeth Risdon, Fred Groves	Adventure	
Mr. Lyndon at Liberty	Harold M. Shaw	Edna Flugrath, Fred Groves, Charles Rock	Thriller	
My Old Dutch	Laurence Trimble	Albert Chevalier, Florence Turner, Henry Edwards	Drama	
The Mystery of a Hansom Cab	Harold Weston	Milton Rosmer, A.V. Bramble	Crime	
The Nightbirds of London	Frank Wilson	Chrissie White, Violet Hopson, Stewart Rome	Crime	
1914	George Loane Tucker	Jane Gail, Hayford Hobbs, Gerald Ames	War	
The Prisoner of Zenda	George Loane Tucker	Henry Ainley, Jane Gail	Adventure	
The Rogues of London	Bert Haldane	Blanche Forsythe, Fred Paul, Maud Yates	Thriller	
A Rogue's Wife	Percy Nash	Gregory Scott, Daisy Cordell, Joan Ritz	Crime	
Royal Love	Percy Nash	Joan Ritz, Eve Balfour, Gregory Scott	Adventure	
Rupert of Hentzau	George Loane Tucker	Henry Ainley, Jane Gail	Adventure	
The Shulamite	George Loane Tucker	Norman McKinnel, Manora Thew, Gerald Ames	Drama	
The Sons of Satan	George Loane Tucker	Gerald Ames, Hayford Hobbs	Crime	
Sweet Lavender	Cecil M. Hepworth	Henry Ainley, Chrissie White, Alma Taylor	Romance	
The Third Generation	Harold M. Shaw	Edna Flugrath, Charles Rock, Mary Dibley	Drama	
Tommy Atkins	Bert Haldane	Blanche Forsythe, Roy Travers	War	
The Traitor	Cecil M. Hepworth	Stewart Rome, Tom Powers, Alma Taylor	War	
The Two Roads	Harold M. Shaw	Edna Flugrath, Ben Webster	Crime	
Under the Red Robe	Wilfred Noy	Owen Roughwood, Dorothy Drake	Historical	
A Welsh Singer	Henry Edwards	Campbell Gullan, Florence Turner	Drama	
The White Hope	Frank Wilson	Stewart Rome, Violet Hopson, Lionelle Howard	Sports	
The White Star	Bertram Phillips	Queenie Thomas, Arthur Walcott	Drama	
A Will of Her Own	Maurice Elvey	Elisabeth Risdon, Fred Groves	Drama	
The Woman Who Did	Walter West	Eve Balfour, Thomas H. MacDonald, George Foley	drama	
The World's Desire	Sidney Morgan	Lilian Braithwaite, Fred Groves, A.V. Bramble	Drama	

== 1916 ==
Title	Director	Cast	Genre	Notes
Altar Chains	Bannister Merwin	Heather Thatcher, Philip Hewland, Edward O'Neill	Crime	
Annie Laurie	Cecil Hepworth	Alma Taylor, Stewart Rome	Romance	
The Answer	Walter West	Muriel Martin-Harvey, George Foley	Drama	
Arsène Lupin	George Loane Tucker	Gerald Ames, Manora Thew, Kenelm Foss	Crime	
The Battle of the Somme	Geoffrey Malins; John McDowell		First World War Documentary/Propaganda	
Beau Brocade	Thomas Bentley	Mercy Hatton, Charles Rock	Adventure/Drama	Based on a novel by Baroness Orczy
The Broken Melody	Cavendish Morton	John Martin Harvey, Hilda Moore, Manora Thew	Romance	
A Bunch of Violets	Frank Wilson	Chrissie White, Gerald Lawrence, Violet Hopson	Drama	
The Chance of a Lifetime	Bertram Phillips	Queenie Thomas, Harry Agar Lyons	Sports	
The Charlatan	Sidney Morgan	Eille Norwood, Violet Graham	Drama	
Comin' Thro' the Rye	Cecil M. Hepworth	Alma Taylor, Stewart Rome, Marguerite Blanche	Drama	
Cynthia in the Wilderness	Harold Weston	Eve Balfour, Ben Webster, Milton Rosmer	Drama	
Diana and Destiny	F. Martin Thornton	Evelyn Boucher, Wyndham Guise, Roy Travers	Drama	
Disraeli	Charles Calvert; Percy Nash	Dennis Eadie, Mary Jerrold	Biopic	Based on a play by Louis N. Parker
Doorsteps	Henry Edwards	Florence Turner, Campbell Gullan	Drama	
Driven	Maurice Elvey	Elisabeth Risdon, Fred Groves	Drama	
Dr. Wake's Patient	Fred Paul	Phyllis Dare, James Lindsay, Mary Rorke	Romance	
East Is East	Henry Edwards	Florence Turner, Henry Edwards	Drama	
Esther	Maurice Elvey	Elisabeth Risdon, Fred Groves, Charles Rock	Historical	
Eve's Daughter	L.C. MacBean	Eve Balfour, Agnes de Winton	Drama	
A Fair Impostor	Alexander Butler	Madge Titheradge, Charles Rock	Drama	
A Fallen Star	Cecil M. Hepworth	Albert Chevalier, Janet Alexander	Drama	
Fatal Fingers	A.V. Bramble, Eliot Stannard	George Bellamy, Mary Merrall	Crime	
The Game of Liberty	George Loane Tucker	Gerald Ames, Douglas Munro, Laura Cowie	Comedy	
The Girl Who Didn't Care	Fred W. Durrant	Mercy Hatton, Tom Coventry	Drama	
The Girl Who Loves a Soldier	Alexander Butler	Vesta Tilley, James Lindsay	War	
The Grand Babylon Hotel	Frank Wilson	Fred Wright, Marguerite Blanche	Thriller	
The Greater Need	Ralph Dewsbury	Milton Rosmer, Gerald Ames, Amy Brandon Thomas	Drama	
The Green Orchard	Harold Weston	Gregory Scott, Dora Barton	Drama	
Grim Justice	Laurence Trimble	Florence Turner, Henry Edwards, Moore Marriott	Drama	
The Hard Way	Walter West	Muriel Martin-Harvey, Joseph Tozer	Crime	
Her Greatest Performance	Fred Paul	Edith Craig, Ellen Terry	Crime	
His Daughter's Dilemma	Ralph Dewsbury	Ben Webster, Manora Thew, Philip Hewland	drama	
Honour in Pawn	Harold Weston	Manora Thew, Julian Royce, George Bellamy	Crime	
The House of Fortescue	Frank Wilson	Violet Hopson, Lionelle Howard, Stewart Rome	Drama	
The Hypocrites	George Loane Tucker	Elisabeth Risdon, Charles Rock, Cyril Raymond	Drama	
Iris	Cecil M. Hepworth	Henry Ainley, Alma Taylor, Stewart Rome	Romance	
It's Always the Woman	Wilfred Noy	Hayden Coffin, Daisy Burrell	Drama	
Just a Girl	Alexander Butler	Daisy Burrell, Owen Nares, Minna Grey	Romance	Based on a novel by Charles Garvice
Kent, the Fighting Man	A.E. Coleby	Billy Wells, Hetty Payne	Sport	
The King's Daughter	Maurice Elvey	Gerald Ames, Janet Ross	Historical	
Lady Windermere's Fan	Fred Paul	Milton Rosmer, Nigel Playfair, Arthur Wontner	Comedy	
The Lifeguardsman	Frank G. Bayley	Frederick Kerr, A.E. Matthews, Leslie Henson	Adventure	
The Little Damozel	Wilfred Noy	J. Hastings Batson, Roy Byford	Drama	
The Lyons Mail	Fred Paul	Harry Irving, Nancy Price	Drama	Based on the play The Courier of Lyons by Charles Reade
The Man Who Bought London	F. Martin Thornton	Evelyn Boucher, Roy Travers, Reginald Fox	Crime	
The Man Without a Soul	George Loane Tucker	Milton Rosmer, Charles Rock, Barbara Everest	Drama	
The Manxman	George Loane Tucker	Henry Ainley, Adeline Hayden Coffin, Will Corrie	Drama	
The Marriage of William Ashe	Cecil M. Hepworth	Henry Ainley, Alma Taylor	Drama	
Me and Me Moke	Harold M. Shaw	Edna Flugrath, Gerald Ames, Hubert Willis	Comedy	
Meg the Lady	Maurice Elvey	Elisabeth Risdon, Fred Groves	Crime	
The Merchant of Venice	Walter West	Hutin Britton, Matheson Lang	Drama	
Milestones	Thomas Bentley	Isobel Elsom, Owen Nares	Drama	
Molly Bawn	Cecil M. Hepworth	Violet Hopson, Alma Taylor, Stewart Rome	Drama	
Mother Love	Maurice Elvey	Elisabeth Risdon, Fred Groves	Drama	
The Mother of Dartmoor	George Loane Tucker	Elisabeth Risdon, Bertram Burleigh, George Bellamy	Drama	
The New Clown	Fred Paul	Manora Thew, Tom Coventry	Comedy	
On the Banks of Allan Water	Wilfred Noy	Basil Gill, Violet Graham	Drama	
Partners at Last	Ralph Dewsbury	Amy Brandon Thomas, Charles Rock, Chappell Dossett	Crime	
The Picture of Dorian Gray	Fred W. Durrant	Henry Victor, Dorothy Fane (actress)		
A Place in the Sun	Laurence Trimble	Reginald Owen, Marguerite Blanche	Drama	
The Real Thing at Last	L.C. MacBean	Edmund Gwenn, Nelson Keys, Godfrey Tearle	Comedy	
Sally Bishop	George Pearson	Marjorie Villis, Peggy Hyland	Romance	
Sally in Our Alley	Laurence Trimble	Hilda Trevelyan, Reginald Owen	Romance	
The Second Mrs Tanqueray	Fred Paul	Hilda Moore, George Alexander, James Lindsay	Drama	
She	Will Barker	Alice Delysia, Henry Victor	Adventure	
Sir James Mortimer's Wager	Leslie Seldon-Truss	Godfrey Tearle, Peggy Hyland	Romance	
A Soldier and a Man	David Aylott	Minna Grey, A.V. Bramble	War drama	
Sowing the Wind	Cecil Hepworth	Henry Ainley, Alma Taylor, Stewart Rome	Romance	
Still Waters Run Deep	Fred Paul	Lady Tree, Milton Rosmer, Rutland Barrington	Crime	
Tom Brown's Schooldays	Rex Wilson	Joyce Templeton, Jack Coleman	Drama	
Trapped by the London Sharks	L.C. MacBean	Humberston Wright, Blanche Forsythe, Bertram Burleigh	Drama	
Trelawny of the Wells	Cecil Hepworth	Alma Taylor, Stewart Rome, Violet Hopson	Romance	
Ultus and the Grey Lady	George Pearson	Frank Dane, Mary Dibley	Crime drama	
Ultus and the Secret of the Night	George Pearson	Lionel d'Aragon, Frank Dane, Mary Dibley	Crime	
The Valley of Fear	Alexander Butler	H. A. Saintsbury, Arthur Cullin, Daisy Burrell, Booth Conway	Detective drama	Sherlock Holmes mystery based on a story by Conan Doyle
The Vicar of Wakefield	Fred Paul	Ben Webster, Laura Cowie	Historical	
Vice Versa	Maurice Elvey	Charles Rock, Douglas Munro	Fantasy	
A Welsh Singer	Henry Edwards	Henry Edwards, Florence Turner	Drama	
When Knights Were Bold	Maurice Elvey	Gerald Ames, Marjorie Day	Comedy	
Whoso Is Without Sin	Fred Paul	Hilda Moore, Milton Rosmer, Flora Morris, Ronald Squire	Drama	

== 1917 ==
Title	Director	Cast	Genre	Notes
The American Heiress	Cecil M. Hepworth	Alma Taylor, Violet Hopson, Stewart Rome	Crime	
Auld Lang Syne	Sidney Morgan	Violet Graham, Henry Baynton	Crime	
A Bid for Fortune	Sidney Morgan	A. Harding Steerman, Violet Graham	Crime	
The Blindness of Fortune	Frank Wilson	Chrissie White, Lionelle Howard, Violet Hopson	Drama	
Broken Threads	Henry Edwards	Chrissie White, A.V. Bramble	Drama	
The Cobweb	Cecil M. Hepworth	Henry Edwards, Alma Taylor, Stewart Rome	Thriller	
The Cost of a Kiss	Adrian Brunel	Bertram Wallis, Ethel Griffies	Drama	
Daddy	Thomas Bentley	Langhorn Burton, William Lugg	Drama	
Derelicts	Sidney Morgan	Violet Graham, Julian Royce	Drama	
Dombey and Son	Maurice Elvey	Norman McKinnel, Lilian Braithwaite, Hayford Hobbs	Drama	
Drink	Sidney Morgan	Fred Groves, Irene Browne	Drama	
The Eternal Triangle	Frank Wilson	Chrissie White, Lionelle Howard, Stewart Rome	Romance	
Everybody's Business	Ralph Dewsbury	Norman McKinnel, Gerald du Maurier	Drama	
Flames	Maurice Elvey	Margaret Bannerman, Owen Nares	Drama	
For All Eternity	Arthur Rooke, A.E. Coleby	Janet Alexander, Malvina Longfellow	Crime	
A Gamble for Love	Frank Wilson	Gerald Ames, James Lindsay, Arthur Walcott	Sports	
The Gay Lord Quex	Maurice Elvey	Ben Webster, Irene Vanbrugh	Comedy	
The Grit of a Jew	Maurice Elvey	Manora Thew, Fred Groves, Marguerite Blanche	Drama	
The Happy Warrior	F. Martin Thornton	James Knight, Minna Grey, Leslie Howard	Sports	
Her Marriage Lines	Frank Wilson	Chrissie White, Lionelle Howard, Stewart Rome	Crime	
Holy Orders	Arthur Rooke, A.E. Coleby	Malvina Longfellow, Maud Yates	Romance	
The House Opposite	Walter West, Frank Wilson	Matheson Lang, Violet Hopson	Drama	
In Another Girl's Shoes	Alexander Butler	Mabel Love, Ruby Miller, Lionel d'Aragon	Romance	
Justice	Maurice Elvey	Gerald du Maurier, Hilda Moore	Crime	
The Labour Leader	Thomas Bentley	Fred Groves, Fay Compton	Drama	
The Laughing Cavalier	A. V. Bramble, Eliot Stannard	Mercy Hatton, Edward O'Neill, George Bellamy	Adventure	
Little Women	Alexander Butler	Daisy Burrell, Minna Grey	Drama	
The Lost Chord	Wilfred Noy	Malcolm Keen, Dorothy Bellew	Drama	
Love's Old Sweet Song	F. Martin Thornton	Evelyn Boucher, Hayford Hobbs	Drama	
The Man Behind 'The Times'	Frank Wilson	Chrissie White, Lionelle Howard, Stewart Rome	Drama	
Mary Girl	Maurice Elvey	Norman McKinnel, Margaret Bannerman, Edward O'Neill	Drama	
Masks and Faces	Fred Paul	Irene Vanbrugh, Gerald du Maurier	Biopic	
Merely Mrs. Stubbs	Henry Edwards	Alma Taylor, Lionelle Howard, Mary Rorke	Drama	
A Munition Girl's Romance	Frank Wilson	Violet Hopson, Gregory Scott, George Foley	Thriller	
My Lady's Dress	Alexander Butler	Gladys Cooper, Malcolm Cherry	Drama	
Nearer My God to Thee	Cecil M. Hepworth	Henry Edwards, Alma Taylor	Drama	
One Summer's Day	Frank G. Bayley	Fay Compton, Owen Nares, Sam Livesey	Drama	
A Pit Boy's Romance	Arthur Rooke, A.E. Coleby	Jimmy Wilde, Tommy Noble	Drama	
The Princess of Happy Chance	Maurice Elvey	Elisabeth Risdon, Gerald Ames	Romance	
Profit and the Loss	A. V. Bramble, Eliot Stannard	James Carew, Randle Ayrton, Saba Raleigh	Drama	
The Profligate	Meyrick Milton	Ben Webster, Amy Brandon Thomas, Isabel Jeans	Drama	
The Ragged Messenger	Frank Wilson	Violet Hopson, Gerald Ames	Drama	
Smith	Maurice Elvey	Elisabeth Risdon, Fred Groves	Romance	
The Sorrows of Satan	Alexander Butler	Gladys Cooper, Owen Nares, Cecil Humphreys	Fantasy	
Tom Jones	Edwin J. Collins	Langhorn Burton, Sybil Arundale, Wyndham Guise	Historical	
Ultus and the Three-Button Mystery	George Pearson	Manora Thew, Charles Rock	Crime	
The Village Blacksmith	Arthur Rooke, A.E. Coleby	Janet Alexander, Arthur Rooke	Drama	
The Ware Case	Walter West	Matheson Lang, Violet Hopson, Ivy Close	Drama	
What Every Woman Knows	Fred W. Durrant	Hilda Trevelyan, Madge Tree, Maud Yates	Comedy	
The Woman Who Was Nothing	Maurice Elvey	Lilian Braithwaite, Madge Titheradge	Crime	

== 1918 ==
Title	Director	Cast	Genre	Notes
Adam Bede	Maurice Elvey	Bransby Williams, Ivy Close	Drama	Adapted from the novel by George Eliot
The Admirable Crichton	G. B. Samuelson	Basil Gill, Mary Dibley, James Lindsay	Comedy	
Ave Maria	Wilfred Noy	Roy Travers, Manning Haynes	Drama	
Because	Sidney Morgan	Lilian Braithwaite, Ben Webster, Joyce Carey	Drama	
Betta, the Gipsy	Charles Raymond	Malvina Longfellow, George Foley	Romance	
Big Money	Harry Lorraine	Charles Rock, Edward O'Neill, Lionel d'Aragon	Drama	
Bonnie Mary	A. V. Bramble	Arthur Cullin, Jeff Barlow	Romance	
Boundary House	Cecil Hepworth	Alma Taylor, Gerald Ames	Drama	
Consequences	Arthur Rooke	Gordon Craig, Joyce Templeton	Comedy	
Deception	A.C. Hunter	James Knight, Charles Rock, Maud Yates	Crime	
Democracy	Sidney Morgan	Bruce Gordon, Queenie Thomas	War	
The Divine Gift	Thomas Bentley	Joyce Dearsley, Henrietta Watson	Drama	
The Elder Miss Blossom	Percy Nash	Isobel Elsom, Minna Grey, Owen Nares	Drama	
A Fortune at Stake	Walter West	Violet Hopson, Gerald Ames, James Lindsay	Drama	
God and the Man	Edwin J. Collins	Langhorn Burton, Joyce Carey	Drama	
God Bless Our Red, White and Blue	Rex Wilson	Isobel Elsom, Owen Nares	Drama	
Goodbye	Maurice Elvey	Margaret Bannerman, Donald Calthrop	Drama	
The Great Game	A.E. Coleby	Billy Wells, Judd Green	Drama	
The Great Impostor	F. Martin Thornton	Edward O'Neill, Lionel d'Aragon	Drama	
The Greatest Wish in the World	Maurice Elvey	Bransby Williams, Mary Odette	Romance	
The Hanging Judge	Henry Edwards	Chrissie White, Randle Ayrton	Drama	
Hindle Wakes	Maurice Elvey	Colette O'Niel, Hayford Hobbs	Drama	
Jo the Crossing Sweeper	Alexander Butler	Dora De Winton, Rolf Leslie	Drama	
The Key of the World	J.L.V. Leigh	Heather Thatcher, Lionel d'Aragon	Romance	
The Kiddies in the Ruins	George Pearson	Emmy Lynn, Hugh E. Wright	War	
The Life Story of David Lloyd George	Maurice Elvey	Norman Page, Alma Reville	Biopic	
The Man and the Moment	Arrigo Bocchi	Manora Thew, Hayford Hobbs	Drama	
The Man Who Won	Rex Wilson	Isobel Elsom, Owen Nares	Romance	
Meg o' the Woods	Bertram Phillips	Queenie Thomas, Alice De Winton	Romance	
Missing the Tide	Walter West	Violet Hopson, Gerald Ames, Ivy Close	Drama	
My Sweetheart	Meyrick Milton	Randle Ayrton, Bert Wynne, Marguerite Blanche	Comedy	
Nature's Gentleman	F. Martin Thornton	James Knight, Madge Stuart	Romance	
Nelson	Maurice Elvey	Donald Calthrop, Malvina Longfellow	Biopic	
Not Negotiable	Walter West	Julian Royce, Manora Thew	Crime	
On Leave	Alexander Butler	Daphne Glenne, George Foley	Crime	
Once Upon a Time	Thomas Bentley	Lauri de Frece, Manora Thew	Romance	
Onward Christian Soldiers	Rex Wilson	Isobel Elsom, Owen Nares, Minna Grey	Romance	
The Passing of the Third Floor Back	Herbert Brenon	Johnston Forbes-Robertson, Molly Pearson	Drama	
A Peep Behind the Scenes	Kenelm Foss, Geoffrey H. Malins	Ivy Close, Gerald Ames	Drama	
Red Pottage	Meyrick Milton	C. Aubrey Smith, Mary Dibley and Gerald Ames	Drama	
Rock of Ages	Bertram Phillips	Queenie Thomas, Leslie George	Drama	
The Romance of Old Bill	George Pearson	Charles Rock, Mary Dibley, Lillian Hall-Davis	War comedy	
A Romany Lass	F. Martin Thornton	James Knight, Marjorie Villis, Charles Rock	Drama	
The Secret Woman	A. E. Coleby	Maud Yates, Janet Alexander, Henry Victor	Drama	
The Slave	Arrigo Bocchi	Hayford Hobbs, Charles Vane	Drama	
The Snare	Frank Wilson	Violet Hopson, George Foley, James Lindsay	Romance	
Spinner o' Dreams	Wilfred Noy	Mary Odette, James Carew, Sam Livesey	Drama	
The Splendid Coward	F. Martin Thornton	James Knight, Roy Travers, Winifred Evans	Crime	
Thelma	Arthur Rooke	Malvina Longfellow, Maud Yayes	Drama	
The Ticket-of-Leave Man	Bert Haldane	Daphne Glenne, George Foley	Crime	
Tinker, Tailor, Soldier, Sailor	Rex Wilson	Isobel Elsom, Owen Nares, James Lindsay	Drama	
The Top Dog	Arrigo Bocchi	Kenelm Foss, Mary Odette, Hayford Hobbs	Drama	
The Touch of a Child	Cecil M. Hepworth	Alma Taylor, Henry Edwards, Stewart Rome	Drama	
Towards the Light	Henry Edwards	Henry Edwards, Chrissie White	Drama	
A Turf Conspiracy	Frank Wilson	Violet Hopson, Gerald Ames, Cameron Carr	Sports	
Victory and Peace	Herbert Brenon	Matheson Lang, Marie Lohr, James Carew	War	
The Wages of Sin	Arrigo Bocchi	Kenelm Foss, Mary Odette, Hayford Hobbs	Drama	
The Way of an Eagle	G.B. Samuelson	Isobel Elsom, Alexander Butler, Mary Dibley	War drama	
What Would a Gentleman Do?	Wilfred Noy	Queenie Thomas, Dora De Winton	Comedy	
The Woman Wins	Frank Wilson	Violet Hopson, Cameron Carr	Crime	

== 1919 ==
Title	Director	Cast	Genre	Notes
1919
12.10	Herbert Brenon	Marie Doro, Ben Webster	Thriller	
After Many Days	Sidney Morgan	Bruce Gordon, Alice Russon, Irene Browne	Drama	
All Men Are Liars	Sidney Morgan	Alice Russon, Bruce Gordon	Drama	
Angel Esquire	W. P. Kellino	Aurelio Sidney, Gertrude McCoy	Crime	
The Artistic Temperament	Fred Goodwins	Louis Willoughby, Margot Kelly	Romance	
The Beetle	Alexander Butler	Maudie Dunham, Fred Morgan	Horror	
Barnaby	Jack Denton	Dorothy Fane, Reginald Fox	Drama	
Bladys of the Stewpony	L. C. MacBean	Wyndham Guise, Harry Worth	Drama	
The Bridal Chair	G. B. Samuelson	Daisy Burrell, Mary Rorke	Romance	
Broken in the Wars	Cecil Hepworth	Henry Edwards, Chrissie White, Alma Taylor	Drama	
Castle of Dreams	Wilfred Noy	Mary Odette, Fred Groves, Gertrude McCoy	Drama	
The Chinese Puzzle	Fred Goodwins	Leon M. Lion, Lilian Braithwaite, Milton Rosmer	Crime	
City of Beautiful Nonsense	Henry Edwards	Chrissie White, Henry Edwards	Drama	
Comradeship	Maurice Elvey	Gerald Ames, Lily Elsie, Guy Newall	Drama	
Convict 99	G. B. Samuelson	Daisy Burrell, Wyndham Guise	Drama	
The Cry for Justice	Albert G. Frenguelli	Amy Brandon Thomas, Mary Glynne	Crime	
Damaged Goods	Alexander Butler	Campbell Gullan, Marjorie Day	Drama	
A Daughter of Eve	Walter West	Violet Hopson, Stewart Rome	Crime	
The Disappearance of the Judge	Alexander Butler	James Lindsay, Joan Lockton	Mystery	
The Double Life of Mr. Alfred Burton	Arthur Rooke	Kenelm Foss, Ivy Duke	Comedy	
Edge O' Beyond	Fred W. Durrant	Ruby Miller, Owen Nares, Isobel Elsom	Drama	
The Elusive Pimpernel	Maurice Elvey	Cecil Humphreys, Teddy Arundell	Adventure	
Fancy Dress	Kenelm Foss	Godfrey Tearle, Ivy Duke	Comedy	
Father O'Flynn	Geoffrey Malins	Reginald Fox, Tom Coventry	Drama	
Fettered	Arrigo Bocchi	Manora Thew, Hayford Hobbs, Fred Morgan	Drama	
The First Men in the Moon	Bruce Gordon; J. L. V. Leigh	Bruce Gordon, Heather Thatcher	Sci Fi/Fantasy	
The Flag Lieutenant	Percy Nash	Ivy Close, George Wynn, Dorothy Fane	War drama	
The Forest on the Hill	Cecil Hepworth	Alma Taylor, James Carew	Crime	
The Further Exploits of Sexton Blake	Harry Lorraine	Douglas Payne, Marjorie Villis	Crime	
Gamblers All	David Aylott	Owen Nares, Ruby Miller	Crime	
The Garden of Resurrection	Arthur Rooke	Guy Newall, Ivy Duke	Drama	
The Gentleman Rider	Walter West	Violet Hopson, Stewart Rome, Gregory Scott	Sports	
God's Clay	Arthur Rooke	Janet Alexander, Humberston Wright	Drama	
God's Good Man	Maurice Elvey	Basil Gill, Peggy Carlisle	Drama	
A Great Coup	George Dewhurst, Walter West	Stewart Rome, Poppy Wyndham	Sports	
The Greater Love	Geoffrey Malins	Ena Beaumont, Charles Rock	Drama	
The Green Terror	W. P. Kellino	Aurelio Sidney, Heather Thatcher	Crime	
Heart and Soul	A. V. Bramble	George Keene, Constance Worth	Crime	
The Heart of a Rose	Jack Denton	Henry Victor, Douglas Payne	Drama	
Her Cross	A. V. Bramble	Ivy Close, Alice De Winton	Drama	
Her Heritage	Bannister Merwin	Jack Buchanan, Phyllis Monkman	Crime	
His Dearest Possession	Henry Edwards	Henry Edwards, Chrissie White, John MacAndrews	Drama	
His Last Defence	Geoffrey Wilmer	Dennis Neilson-Terry, Mary Glynne, Cyril Raymond	Crime	
The Homemaker	George Dewhurst	Manora Thew, Basil Gill, Gwynne Herbert	Romance	
I Will	Kenelm Foss, Hubert Herrick	Guy Newall, Ivy Duke	Comedy	
The Impossible Woman	Meyrick Milton	Constance Collier, Langhorn Burton, Christine Rayner	Comedy	
In the Gloaming	Edwin J. Collins	Violet Hopson, Cameron Carr	Drama	
The Irresistible Flapper	Frank Wilson	Violet Hopson, Ivy Close, Gerald Ames	Comedy	
Keeper of the Door	Maurice Elvey	Basil Gill, Peggy Carlisle	Drama	
The Kinsman	Henry Edwards	James Carew, Henry Edwards	Comedy	
'The Knave of Hearts'	F. Martin Thornton	James Knight, Evelyn Boucher	Romance	
The Lackey and the Lady	Thomas Bentley	Leslie Howard, A. E. Matthews	Drama	
The Lads of the Village	Harry Lorraine	Maudie Dunham, Bernard Dudley	Comedy	
The Lady Clare	Wilfred Noy	Mary Odette, Jack Hobbs	Drama	
The Lamp of Destiny	Alexander Butler	Daphne Glenne, Judd Green	Drama	
A Lass o' the Looms	Jack Denton	Henry Victor, Douglas Payne	Drama	
The Life of a London Actress	Alexander Butler	Daphne Glenne, James Lindsay, Daisy Cordell	Romance	
Linked by Fate	Albert Ward	Isobel Elsom, Malcolm Cherry	Drama	
A Little Bit of Fluff	Kenelm Foss	Ernest Thesiger, Dorothy Minto	Comedy	
The Man Who Forgot	F. Martin Thornton	James Knight, Marjorie Villis	Drama	
The March Hare	Frank Miller	Godfrey Tearle, Ivy Duke	Comedy	
A Member of Tattersall's	Albert Ward	Isobel Elsom, Malcolm Cherry	Sports	
Midnight Gambols	James C. McKay	Marie Doro, Godfrey Tearle	Drama	
Mrs. Thompson	Rex Wilson	Minna Grey, C. M. Hallard	Drama	
Mr. Wu	Maurice Elvey	Matheson Lang, Roy Royston, Lillah McCarthy, Meggie Albanesi	Drama	
The Nature of the Beast	Cecil Hepworth	Alma Taylor Gerald Ames, James Carew	Drama	
Nobody's Child	George Edwardes-Hall	José Collins, Godfrey Tearle	Drama	
Not Guilty	Arrigo Bocchi	Kenelm Foss, Charles Vane, Hayford Hobbs	Comedy	
The Odds Against Her	Alexander Butler	Milton Rosmer, Edna Dormeuil	Drama	
Onward Christian Soldiers	Rex Wilson	Isobel Elsom, Owen Nares	Romance	
Pallard the Punter	J. L. V. Leigh	Heather Thatcher, Lionel d'Aragon, Cecil Morton York	Sports	
Patricia Brent, Spinster	Geoffrey Malins	Ena Beaumont, Polly Emery	Comedy	
The Polar Star	Arrigo Bocchi	Manora Thew, Hayford Hobbs	Mystery	
Possession	Henry Edwards	Henry Edwards, Chrissie White	Romance	
The Power of Right	Floyd Martin Thornton	James Knight, Evelyn Boucher	War	
Queen's Evidence	James MacKay	Godfrey Tearle, Unity More	Adventure	
Quinneys	Rex Wilson	Henry Ainley, Isobel Elsom	Romance	
The Right Element	Rex Wilson	Campbell Gullan, Miriam Ferris	Drama	
The Rocks of Valpre	Maurice Elvey	Basil Gill, Peggy Carlisle	Drama	
The Romance of Lady Hamilton	Bert Haldane	Malvina Longfellow, Humberston Wright, Cecil Humphreys	Historical	
Russia: Land of Tomorrow	Maurice Sandground	Eve Balfour, A. B. Imeson	Drama	
The Sands of Time	Randle Ayrton	Mercy Hatton, Bertram Burleigh	Drama	
The Secret of the Moor	Louis Willoughby	Gwen Williams, Philip Hewland	Drama	
Shackleton's Expedition to the Antarctic			Documentary	
Sheba	Cecil M. Hepworth	Alma Taylor, Gerald Ames, James Carew	Drama	
The Silver Greyhound	Bannister Merwin	James Knight, Marjorie Villis	Crime	
The Silver Lining	A. E. Coleby	Billy Wells, Warwick Ward	Sports	
The Single Man	A. V. Bramble	Cecil Mannering, Doris Lytton	Drama	
A Sinless Sinner	James C. McKay	Marie Doro, Godfrey Tearle, Sam Livesey	Drama	
A Smart Set	A. V. Bramble	Concordia Merrel, Neville Percy	Crime	
Snow in the Desert	Walter West	Violet Hopson, Stewart Rome, Poppy Wyndham	Drama	
The Soul of Guilda Lois	Frank Wilson	Violet Hopson, Basil Gill, Cameron Carr	Drama	
Splendid Folly	Arrigo Bocchi	Manora Thew, Hayford Hobbs	Romance	
The Starting Point	Edwin J. Collins	Constance Worth, Evan Thomas	Drama	
Sunken Rocks	Maurice Elvey	Alma Taylor, Gerald Ames, James Carew	Drama	
Sweet and Twenty	Sidney Morgan	Marguerite Blanche, Langhorn Burton	Romance	
The Swindler	Maurice Elvey	Cecil Humphreys, Marjorie Hume	Drama	
The Thundercloud	Alexander Butler	James Lindsay, Mary Dibley	Crime	
The Toilers	Tom Watts	Manora Thew, George Dewhurst, Ronald Colman	Drama	
Tower of Strength	Randle Ayrton	James Knight, Bertram Burleigh	Romance	
Under Suspicion	Walter West	Hilda Bayley, Cameron Carr	Drama	
The Usurper	Duncan McRae	Gertrude McCoy, Cecil Ward	Drama	
The Warrior Strain	F. Martin Thornton	Harry Agar Lyons, Evelyn Boucher	War	
Westward Ho!	Percy Nash	Renee Kelly, Charles Quatermaine	Historical	
When It Was Dark	Arrigo Bocchi	Manora Thew, Hayford Hobbs	Drama	
Whosoever Shall Offend	Arrigo Bocchi	Kenelm Foss, Mary Odette, Hayford Hobbs	Crime	
Wisp o' the Woods	Cecil M. Hepworth, Louis Willoughby	Constance Worth, Evan Thomas	Romance	
Women Who Win	Percy Nash	Mary Dibley, Mary Forbes	Drama	

== See also ==
- 1888 in the United Kingdom
- 1889 in the United Kingdom
- 1890 in the United Kingdom
- 1895 in the United Kingdom
- 1896 in the United Kingdom
- 1897 in the United Kingdom
- 1898 in the United Kingdom
- 1899 in the United Kingdom
- 1900 in the United Kingdom
- 1901 in the United Kingdom
- 1903 in the United Kingdom
- 1905 in the United Kingdom
- 1906 in the United Kingdom
- 1907 in the United Kingdom
- 1908 in the United Kingdom
- 1909 in the United Kingdom
- 1910 in the United Kingdom
- 1911 in the United Kingdom
- 1912 in the United Kingdom
- 1913 in the United Kingdom
- 1914 in the United Kingdom
- 1915 in the United Kingdom
- 1916 in the United Kingdom
- 1917 in the United Kingdom
- 1918 in the United Kingdom
- 1919 in the United Kingdom
