= Name the Woman =

Name the Woman may refer to:

- Name the Woman (1928 film), an American silent film directed by Erle C. Kenton
- Name the Woman (1934 film), an American film directed by Albert S. Rogell
