= For All Eternity =

For All Eternity may refer to:

- For All Eternity (film)
- For All Eternity (band)
