= Margaret Webster =

American actress and director (1905–1972)

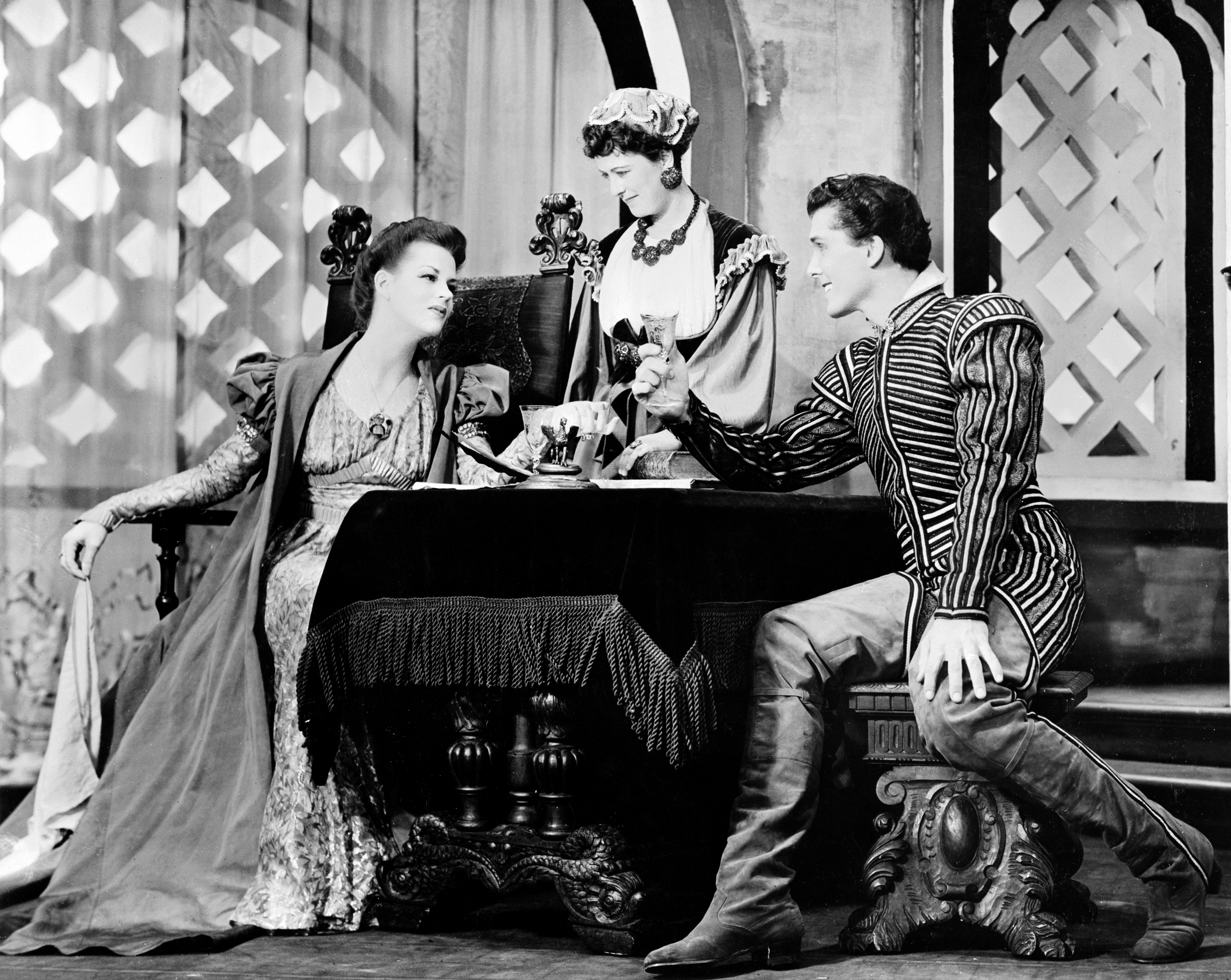
- Scene from Margaret Webster's Broadway production of Othello (1943) with Uta Hagen as Desdemona, Webster as Emilia, and Jack Manning as Roderigo
- Born: March 15, 1905; New York City, US
- Died: November 13, 1972 (aged 67); Sydenham, London, England
- Occupations: Actress; director; producer
- Parents: Ben Webster (father); Dame May Whitty (mother)
- Relatives: Benjamin Nottingham Webster (great-grandfather)

Margaret Webster (March 15, 1905 – November 13, 1972) was an American-British theater actress, producer and director. Critic George Jean Nathan described her as "the best director of the plays of Shakespeare that we have."

== Life and career ==
Margaret Webster was born in New York City, the daughter of two famous actors, Ben Webster and Dame May Whitty. She was their second child, her older brother died in infancy. Her birth was announced on stage at the theatre her father was performing in during a Shakespeare play. The family travelled extensively during her formative years as her parents moved between the US and UK with various touring theatre companies. At 13, she became a boarder at Queen Anne's School, Caversham, an independent school in England.

Given her unique parentage, she was allowed time off school to act in performances with her parents. This included being on stage alongside the renowned theatre actress Ellen Terry. Terry and her family including her daughter Edith Craig were good friends with the Websters. Upon graduating in 1923, she turned down the opportunity to attend Cambridge University in order to pursue her acting career. She went on to attend Etlinger Dramatic School, London, England where her mother Dame May Whitty was a manager and acting coach.

She spent the early part of her career in England, where she became well known in the theatre. She worked for several established theatrical companies, including from 1929–1930 at The Old Vic.

She returned to the US in 1937 and began an impressive run directing the Shakespeare play, Richard II with Maurice Evans in the title role. They formed a partnership that lasted until 1942, with Webster directing Evans in Broadway productions of Hamlet, Twelfth Night and Henry IV, Part I. In 1941–42, she directed Evans and Judith Anderson in a Broadway production of Macbeth. It was while she was directing Hamlet in 1938 that she began her long romantic relationship with actress Eva Le Gallienne.

Webster was also believed to have had a brief off or on relationship with the actress Mady Christians during this same time frame. On Broadway, Christians played Queen Gertrude in Hamlet and Lady Percy in Henry IV, Part I, staged by Webster. Webster and Christians became close friends: according to Webster biographer Milly S. Barranger, it is likely that they also were lovers. Webster was said to be devastated by Christians' death from a stroke in 1951. Webster was part of a small but influential group of lesbian producers, directors, and actors in theater (a group that included Eva Le Gallienne and Cheryl Crawford).

When Evans joined the army, Webster continued to have success directing classical plays on Broadway, notably The Cherry Orchard (1944), starring Le Gallienne, and her greatest triumph Othello (1943), starring Paul Robeson in the title role and Jose Ferrer as Iago, which ran for 296 performances, by far the longest run of a Shakespearean production on Broadway, a record that has not been remotely approached since. Webster played Emilia in the production's initial year (she was replaced by Edith King in 1944).

In 1945, she staged the longest-running performance of Shakespeare's The Tempest to play Broadway, with Arnold Moss as Prospero, Canada Lee as Caliban, and ballerina Vera Zorina as Ariel. This production was only the second U.S. staging of a Shakespeare play to feature an African-American actor in a prominent role among an otherwise all-white cast. The production played for 100 performances, then took a short break and returned to Broadway for 24 more performances.

In 1946, Webster and Le Gallienne co-founded the American Repertory Theater with producer Cheryl Crawford, with Webster's staging of Shakespeare's Henry VIII as its premiere production, starring Le Gallienne as Katherine, Walter Hampden as Cardinal Wolsey and Victor Jory in the title role. The theater operated until 1948, staging such plays as John Gabriel Borkman, Ghosts, and a legendary production of Alice in Wonderland in which Webster played the Cheshire Cat and the Red Queen.

In 1948, her affair with Le Gallienne ended and she went on tour with her company, the Margaret Webster Shakespeare Company. The tour lasted until 1951, but Webster left in 1950 to become the first woman to direct a production at the Metropolitan Opera. Her debut production of Don Carlo served as opening night of the 1950–51 season and began the tenure of Rudolf Bing as general manager. Her subsequent productions were Aida (1951) and Simon Boccanegra (1959). Around 1953, she met the British author Pamela Frankau with whom she fell in love, and by 1957, they were living together at 55 Christchurch Hill in Hampstead, London. In 1964, she directed Leo Genn in 12 Angry Men in London. She also directed Macbeth at the New York City Opera.

Frankau and Webster frequently moved between London and Webster's home in Aquinnah on Martha's Vineyard. They remained together until Frankau's death from breast cancer in 1967. Webster dedicated her first autobiography, titled The Same, Only Different: Five Generations of a Great Theatre Family (1969), to Frankau.

In 1968, Webster began a whirlwind romance with a married but separated American woman named Jane Brundred. She moved into Webster's Aquinnah home but within a few months was diagnosed with terminal cancer. Brundred bequeathed money to Webster in her will despite her family being against their relationship. The money was used for a memorial sculpture in Brundred's memory in a Shakespeare garden at Vineyard Haven public library. The remainder of the money helped Webster permanently move to London after her own cancer diagnosis two years after Brundred's death. The final play she directed was George Bernard Shaw's Mrs Warren's Profession, where she directed the actress and singer Mary Ellis in 1970. Webster died from colon cancer at St Christopher's Hospice, 51 Lawrie Park Road, Sydenham, England in 1972, aged 67.
