= Onward Christian Soldiers (film) =

1918 film by Rex Wilson

Onward Christian Soldiers is a 1918 British silent romance film directed by Rex Wilson and starring Isobel Elsom, Owen Nares and Minna Grey.

== Cast ==
- Isobel Elsom - The Girl
- Owen Nares - The Soldier
- Minna Grey - The Sister
- Tom Reynolds - The Man
