= Ora Pro Nobis =

- Directed by: Rex Wilson
- Written by: Rowland Talbot
- Produced by: Arrigo Bocchi
- Production company: Windsor Films
- Distributed by: Walturdaw
- Release date: January 1917
- Country: United Kingdom
- Languages: Silent; English intertitles

Ora Pro Nobis is a 1917 British silent drama film directed by Rex Wilson.

== Cast ==
- Henry Victor as Lord Osborne
- Harding Thomas as The Organist
- Elizabeth Calkin as The Child

== Bibliography ==
- Palmer, Scott. British Film Actors' Credits, 1895-1987. McFarland, 1998.
