= May Whitty =

English actress (1865–1948)

Dame May Whitty DBE
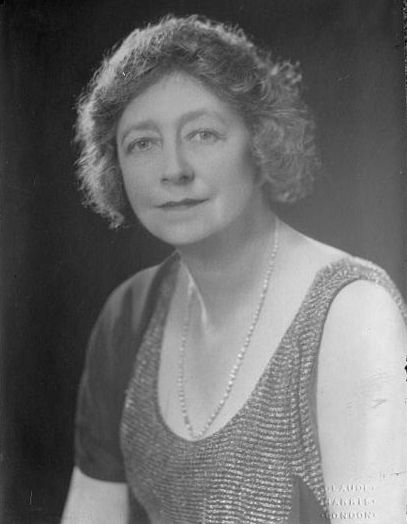
- Born: Mary Louise Whitty; 19 June 1865; Liverpool, Lancashire, England
- Died: 29 May 1948 (aged 82); Beverly Hills, California, U.S.
- Occupation: Actress
- Years active: 1881–1948
- Spouse: Ben Webster (m. 1892; died 1947)
- Children: 2, including Margaret

Dame Mary Louise Webster (née Whitty; 19 June 1865 – 29 May 1948), known professionally as May Whitty and later, for her charity work, Dame May Whitty, was an English stage and film actress. She was one of the first two women entertainers to become a Dame. The British actors' union Equity was established in her home in 1930.

After a successful career both on the West End stage and in British films, she moved over to Hollywood films at the age of 72. In 1937, Whitty made her American debut in Night Must Fall, for which she earned her first Academy Award nomination for Best Supporting Actress. Subsequently, Whitty starred in a string of commercial and critical successes that elevated her career and star-status. She starred in two Alfred Hitchcock films, The Lady Vanishes (1938) and Suspicion (1941), and earned her second Academy Award nomination for the war-drama Mrs. Miniver (1942), the highest grossing film of 1942. Her other film roles include The Constant Nymph (1943), Lassie Come Home (1943), Madame Curie (1943), Gaslight (1944), and Green Dolphin Street (1947).

== Background ==
Whitty was born in Liverpool, England, to William Alfred Whitty (circa 1837–1876), a newspaper proprietor, and Mary Louisa (née Ashton, circa 1837–1894). Her grandfather was Michael James Whitty, Chief Constable in Liverpool and founder of the Liverpool Daily Post. She made her first stage appearance in Liverpool in 1881, later moving to London to appear in the West End.

She married the actor-manager Ben Webster on 3 August 1892 in St Giles's Parish Church, London. In 1895 they visited the United States, where Whitty appeared on Broadway. Their first child, a son, died at birth. Their only surviving child, a daughter born in New York in 1905, Margaret Webster, was a producer who held dual US and UK citizenship. She was chair of the Actresses' Franchise League (AFL).

Whitty's stage career continued for the rest of her life. In March 1910, she made her transition to middle-aged and elderly character roles, playing Amelia Madras in Harley Granville-Barker's four-act comedy The Madras House. During World War I she was active in the AFL, working there to help organize the Women's Emergency Corps. In March 1922, she played the role of Mrs. Bennet before the Queen in a benefit performance of Pride and Prejudice. She acted opposite her husband, who played Mr. Darcy.

== Honours ==
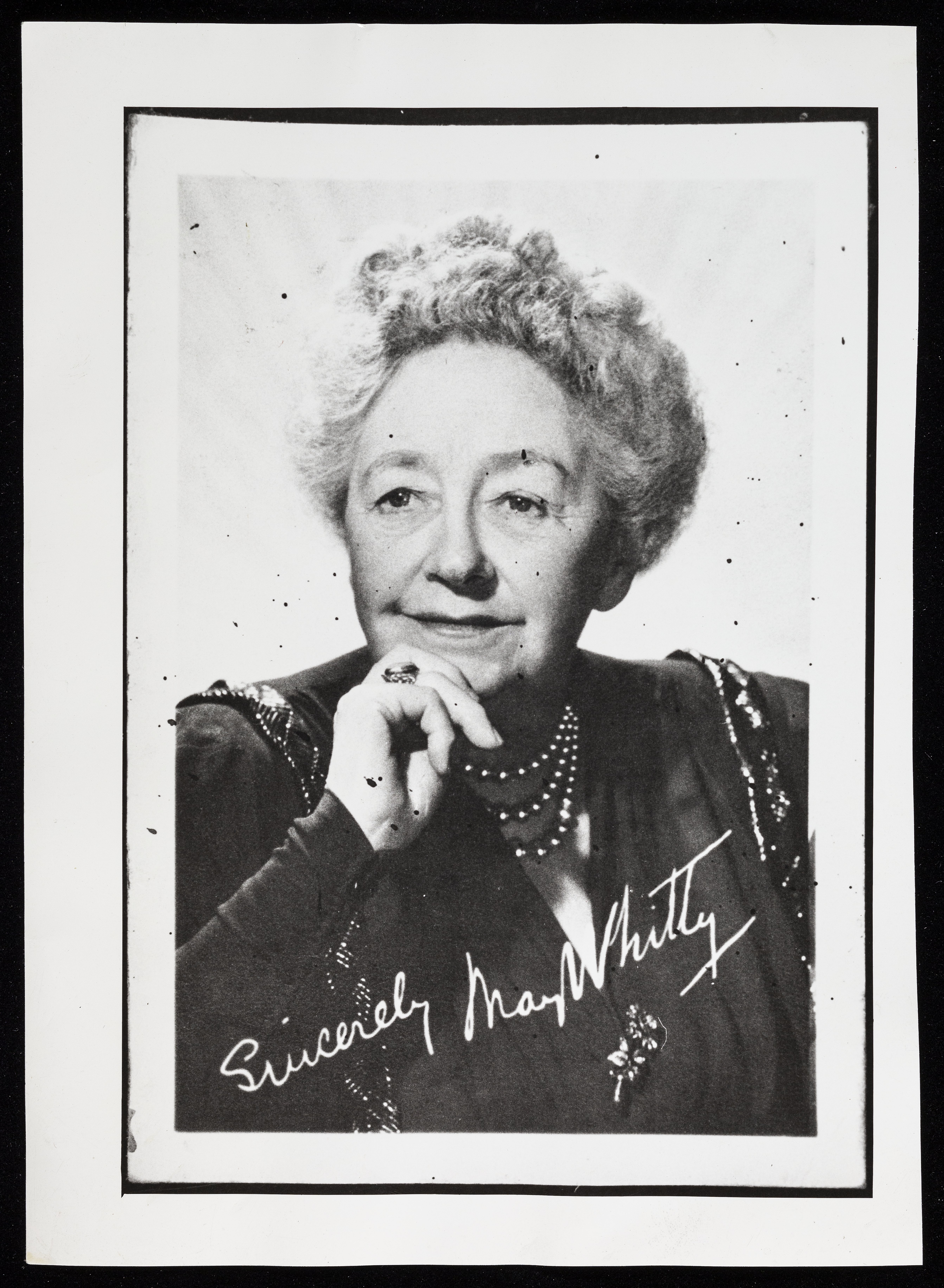
May Whitty signed portrait

In the 1918 New Year Honours, she was made a Dame Commander of the Order of the British Empire (DBE, gazetted under her legal married name Mary Louise Webster) in recognition of her charitable work during the First World War for the Three Arts Women's Employment Fund and the British Women's Hospitals Committee. She was the first stage and film actress to receive a damehood, along with the opera singer Nellie Melba, who was also thus honoured in 1918.

== Film career and death ==
Whitty made her Hollywood film debut at the age of 72, recreating her 1935 stage role in the Hollywood film Night Must Fall (1937), which also starred Robert Montgomery and Rosalind Russell. She received an Oscar nomination. Whitty’s supporting roles in film included that of the vanishing lady, Miss Froy, in Alfred Hitchcock's The Lady Vanishes (1938).

In 1939, Whitty moved to the United States, although she never became a US citizen. She appeared on stage and in Hollywood films, often playing wealthy dowagers. It was one such part, as Lady Beldon in Mrs. Miniver (1942), that brought her a second Academy Award nomination.

Whitty’s husband died in 1947. She died on 29 May 1948 in Beverly Hills, California, from cancer at the age of 82. She is commemorated with a plaque at St Paul's Church in Covent Garden, London, beside a plaque to her husband.

== Stage roles ==
Dates are of the first performance.

Date (year, month, day)	Title	Author(s)	City	Theatre	Role
1890-02-14	The Home Feud	Walter Frith	London	Comedy	Helen Joliffe
1890-07-04	Vanity of Vanities	Justin Huntly McCarthy	London	Shaftesbury	Princess Nicholas
1891-01-07	Private Enquiry	F. C. Burnand (based on Albert Valabrègue's La Sécurité des Familles)	London	Royal Strand	Mrs. Buckleigh
1891-02-14	Turned Up	Mark Melford	London	Royal Strand	Sabina Medway
1891-04-01	Linda Grey	Sir Charles L. Young	London	Princes	Lady Broughton
1891-04-15	Our Daughters	T.G. Warren & Willie Edouin	London	Royal Strand	Nellie Mayhew
1891-07-01	Mrs. Annesley	J. F. Cooke	London	Criterion	Estelle Brandreth
1891-07-27	Fate and Fortune, or, The Junior Partner	James J. Blood	London	Princess's	Grace Hasluck
1892-01-06	The Showman's Daughter	Frances Hodgson Burnett	London	Royalty	Linda Hurst
1892-02-16	The Silver Shield	Sydney Grundy	London	Vaudeville	Lucy Preston
1892-05-10	A Caprice	Justin Huntly McCarthy, adapted from Alfred de Musset's Un Caprice	London	Vaudeville	Mathilde
1892-05-25	The Noble Art	Eille Norwood	London	Terry's	Gertie Fullalove
1892-05-26	In the Season	Langdon Elwyn Mitchell	London	Vaudeville	Sybil March
1892-09-14	Our Boys	Henry James Byron	London	Vaudeville	Mary Melrose
1893-01-28	The Guv'Nor	Robert Reece (writing under the pseudonym E.G. Lankester)	London	Vaudeville	Aurelia
1893-02-16	Flight	Walter Frith	London	Terry's	Mrs. Amherst
1893-06-09	The Younger Son	R.S. Sievier	London	Gaiety	Evelyn Brookfield
1893-06-19	The Adventures of a Night	Meyrick Milton, adaptated from Los Empenos de Seis Horas by Pedro Calderón de la Barca	London	Royal Strand	Donna Bianca
1893-12-21	Beauty's Toils	Charles S. Fawcett, founded on Her Fatal Beauty by W.B. Maxell	London	Royal Strand	Ethel Cumming
1894-07-02	Our Flot	Mrs. H. Musgrave	London	Royal Strand	Margery Sylvester
1895-03-12	A Loving Legacy	Fred W. Sidney	London	Royal Strand	Kitty O'Rourke
1895-04-15	Fanny	George Robert Sims and Cecil Raleigh	London	Royal Strand	Grace Dormer
1895-04-15	The Backslider	Osmond Shillingford	London	Royal Strand	Mrs. Agatha Dolomite
1895-06-27	Louis XI	Dion Boucicault, adaptated by Saimir Delavigne	London	Lyceum	Marie
1895-07-12	The Lyons Mail	Charles Reader, adaptation of Le Courrier de Lyon by Émile Moreau, Giraudin & Delacour	London	Lyceum	Julie Lesurques
1895-07-15	The Corsican Brothers	Dion Boucicault, adaptation of Alexandre Dumas's The Corsican Brothers	London	Lyceum	Emelie de l'Esparre
1895-07-24	Macbeth	William Shakespeare	London	Lyceum	A gentlewoman
1896-12-03	A Princess of Orange	Fred James	London	Lyceum	Louise, Princess of Orange
1896-12-10	An Old Song	Rev. Freeman Wills and A. Fitzmaurice King	London	Criterion	Signora Sara Rosetti
1897-12-23	Secret Service: A Romance of the Southern Confederacy	William Gillette	London	Adelphi	Edith Varney
1898-12-03	Cupboard Love	Henry V. Esmond	London	Court	Rosamond Pilliner
1899-06-06	The Heather Field	Edward Martyn	London	Terry's	Grace Tyrrell
1899-09-04	The Last Chapter	George H. Broadhurst	London	Royal Strand	Katherine Blake
1901-05-11	Toff Jim	Fred Wright	London	Apollo	Primrose
1908-01-20	Irene Wycherley	Anthony P. Wharton	New York	Astor	Carrie Hardinge
1910-03-01	The Sentimentalists	George Meredith	London	Duke of York's	Dame Dresden
1910-03-10	The Madras House	Harley Granville-Barker	London	Duke of York's	Amelia Madras
1910-04-05	Trelawny of the Wells	Arthur Wing Pinero	London	Duke of York's	Miss Trafalgar Gower
1910-11-18	The Home Coming	Cicely Hamilton	London	Aldwych	Mrs. Daly
1911-05-08	The First Actress	Christabel Marshall	London	Kingsway	Peg Woffington
1911-05-12	The Baron's Wager	Charles Young	London	Playhouse	Clothislde, Marquise de Marsay
1912-02-01	The Bear-Leaders	R. C. Carton	London	Comedy	Dowager Countess of Grimsdal
1912-02-09	Edith	Elizabeth Baker	London	Princess's	Mrs. Stott
1912-08-12	Ready Money	James Montgomery	London	New	Mrs. John Tyler
1913-03-31	A Matter of Money (first played in Glasgow under the title The Cutting of the Know)	Cicely Hamilton	London	Little	Mrs. Channing
1913-03-11	Open Windows	A.E.W. Mason	London	St. James's	Lady Cluffe
1913-10-04	The Grand Seigneur	Edward Ferris and Bertram P. Matthews	London	Savoy	Comtesse Malise
1914-09-08	The Impossible Woman	C. Haddon Chambers	London	Savoy	Mrs. Talcot
1915-04-15	The Green Flag	Keble Howard	London	Vaudeville	Mrs. Kesteven
1915-10-16	Iris Intervenes	John Hastings Turner	London	Kingsway	Mary Cumbers
1916-02-28	The Arm of the Law	Arthur Bourchier, adapted from La Robe Rouge by Eugène Brieux	London	His Majesty's	Mme. Vagret
1916-05-28	The Eternal Snows	Michael Orme [pseudonym of Alix Augusta Grein]	London	Criterion	Mary Chartwell
1917-04-09	The Passing of the Third Floor Back	Jerome K. Jerome	London	Playhouse	Cheat, Mrs. Sharpe, Lady of the House
1917-07-27	Trelawny of the Wells	Arthur W. Pinero	London	New	Miss Trafalgar Gower
1917-09-07	Trelawny of the Wells	Arthur W. Pinero	London	New	Miss Trafalgar Gower
1922-03-01	The Enchanted Cottage	Arthur Pinero	London	Duke of York's	Mrs. Corsellis
1922-03-24	Pride and Prejudice	Eileen H.A. Squire & J.C. Squire, adapted from Jane Austen's novel	London	Palace	Mrs. Bennett
1922-05-18	Life's a Game	Michael Orme [pseud. Alix Augusta Grein]	London	Kingsway	Lady Raunds
1922-12-04	Destruction	Agnese de Llana	London	Royalty	Ella Singleton
1924-09-18	The Fool	Channing Pollock	London	Apollo	Mrs. Henry Gilliam
1925-05-11	My Lady's Dress	Edward Knblock	London	Adelphi	La Grisa
1925-06-22	March Hares (The Temperamentalists)	Harry Wagstaff Gribble	London	Little	Mrs. Janet Rodney
1925-09-22	The Last of Mrs. Cheyney	Frederick Lonsdale	London	St. James's	Mrs. Ebley
1927-12-27	Sylvia	James Dyrenforth	London	Vaudeville	Mrs. Considine
1928-04-19	Come With Me	Basil Dean and Margaret Kennedy	London	New	Lady Alethea Zaidner
1929-06-01	Sybarites	H. Dennis Bradley	London	Arts	Lady Byfleet
1929-07-24	Gentlemen of the Jury	Francis A. Campton	London	Arts	Lady Blakeney
1929-09-05	Dear Brutus	J. M. Barrie	London	Playhouse	Mrs. Coade
1929-12-03	The Major Explains	W.R. Walkes	London	Prince of Wales	[unnamed role]
1929-12-03	The Amorists	H. Dennis Bradley	London	Royalty	Lady Byfleet
1930-12-26	A Business Marriage	Anonymous	London	Court	Mrs. Mabley Jones
1931-10-12	There's Always Juliet	John Van Druten	London	Apollo	Florence
1931-10-12	There's Always Juliet	John Van Druten	New York	Empire	Florence
1932-08-16	Behold, We Live	John van Druten	London	St. James's	Dame Frances Evers
1932-10-02	Please Don't Be Nervous	Ann Stephenson	London	Shaftesbury	Mother
1933-08-08	In Vino Veritas	Walter Hudd	London	Arts	Oakley
1933-08-08	The Long Christmas Dinner	Thornton Wilder	London	Arts	Mother Bayard
1933-08-01	The Lake	Dorothy Massingham (with Murray Macdonald)	London	Arts	Mildred Surrege
1933-08-01	The Lake	Dorothy Massingham (with Murray Macdonald)	London	Westminster	Mildred Surrege
1933-11-29	Man Proposes	Warren Chetham-Strode	London	Wyndham's	Mary Railton
1934-05-03	The Voysey Inheritance	Harley Granville-Barker	London	Sadler's Wells	Mrs. Voysey
1934-06-14	Meeting At Night	Marjorie Sharp	London	Globe	Mrs. Crowborough
1934-07-04	The Maitlands	Ronald Mackenzie	London	Wyndham's	May Maitland
1934-11-08	It Happened To Adam	David Boehm	London	Duke of York's	Mrs. Sloane
1935-03-11	Ringmaster	Keith Winter	London	Shaftesbury	Mrs. West
1935-04-07	One Must Go On	George Porter	London	Comedy	Mrs. John Brown
1935-05-31	Night Must Fall	Emlyn Williams	London	Duchess	Mrs. Bramson
1935-12-01	Farm of Three Echoes	Noel Langley	London	Wyndham's	Ouma Gerart
1936-09-28	Night Must Fall	Emlyn Williams	New York	Ethel Barrymore	Mrs. Bramson
1938-01-10	Your Obedient Husband	Horace Jackson	New York	Broadhurst	Mrs. Scurlock
1938-05-23	Here's To Our Enterprise	Edward Knoblock	London	Lyceum	[herself]
1940-05-09	Romeo and Juliet	William Shakespeare	New York	51st Street	Nurse to Juliet
1941-04-08	The Trojan Women	Euripides	New York	Cort	Hecuba
1945-10-09	Therese	Thomas Job, based on Thérèse Raquin by Émile Zola	New York	Biltmore	Madame Raquin

== Filmography ==
See the British Film Institute.

Year	Film	Role	Notes
1914	Enoch Arden	Miriam Lane	
1915	The Little Minister	Nanny Webster	
1920	Colonel Newcombe, the Perfect Gentleman	Mrs. Mackenzie	
1936	Keep Your Seats, Please	Aunt Georgina Withers	Uncredited
1937	Night Must Fall	Mrs. Bramson	
1937	Conquest	Maria Letizia Buonaparte	
1938	I Met My Love Again	Aunt William	
1938	The Lady Vanishes	Miss Froy	
1939	Raffles	Lady Melrose	
1940	Return to Yesterday	Mrs. Truscott	
1940	A Bill of Divorcement	Aunt Hester Fairfield	
1941	One Night in Lisbon	Florence	
1941	Suspicion	Mrs. Martha McLaidlaw	
1942	Mrs. Miniver	Lady Beldon	
1942	Thunder Birds	Lady Jane Stackhouse	
1943	Forever and a Day	Mrs. Lucy Trimble	
1943	Slightly Dangerous	Baba	
1943	Crash Dive	Grandmother	
1943	The Constant Nymph	Lady Constance Longborough	
1943	Stage Door Canteen	Herself	
1943	Lassie Come Home	Dally	
1943	Flesh and Fantasy	Lady Pamela Hardwick	Episode 2
1943	Madame Curie	Madame Eugene Curie	
1944	Gaslight	Miss Bessie Thwaites	
1944	The White Cliffs of Dover	Nanny	
1945	My Name Is Julia Ross	Hughes	
1946	Devotion	Lady Thornton	
1947	Green Dolphin Street	Mother Superior	
1947	This Time for Keeps	Grandmother Cambaretti	
1947	If Winter Comes	Mrs. Perch	
1948	The Sign of the Ram	Clara Brastock	
1948	The Return of October	Aunt Martha Grant	Final film role

=== Television films ===
Year	Title	Role
1938	Parnell	Aunt Caroline
1939	Mary Rose	Mrs. Morland
1939	The Royal Family of Broadway	Fanny Cavendis
1939	Rake's Progress	Mrs. Mead, Wilkes's mother-in-law

== See also ==
- List of actors with Academy Award nominations

== Works consulted ==
- Casson, Lewis (2004). "Webster, Benjamin (1864–1947)". Oxford Dictionary of National Biography. doi:10.1093/ref:odnb/36806. ISBN 978-0-19-861412-8.
- Gaye, Freda, ed. (1967). Who's Who in the Theatre (fourteenth ed.). London: Sir Isaac Pitman and Sons. OCLC 5997224.
- Nissen, Axel (2007). Actresses of a Certain Character: forty familiar Hollywood faces from the thirties to the fifties. Jefferson, NC: McFarland & Co. p. 209. ISBN 978-0-7864-2746-8.
- Parker, John, ed. (1922). Who's Who in the Theatre (fourth ed.). London: Sir Isaac Pitman and Sons. OCLC 473894893.
- Wearing, J.P. (1976). The London Stage, 1890–1899: a Calendar of Plays and Players. Metuchen, NJ: Scarecrow Press. ISBN 978-0-8108-0910-9.
- Wearing, J.P. (1981). The London Stage, 1900–1909: a Calendar of Plays and Players. Metuchen, NJ: Scarecrow Press. ISBN 978-0-8108-1403-5.
- Wearing, J.P. (1982). The London Stage, 1910–1919: a Calendar of Plays and Players. Metuchen, NJ: Scarecrow Press. ISBN 978-0-8108-1596-4.
- Wearing, J.P. (1984). The London Stage, 1920–1929: a Calendar of Plays and Players. Metuchen, NJ: Scarecrow Press. ISBN 978-0-8108-1715-9.
- Wearing, J.P. (1990). The London Stage, 1930–1939: a Calendar of Plays and Players. Metuchen, NJ: Scarecrow Press. ISBN 978-0-8108-2349-5.
