= A Pit Boy's Romance =

A Pit-boy's Romance
- Directed by: A. E. Coleby; Arthur Rooke
- Written by: A. E. Coleby; Arthur Rooke
- Starring: Jimmy Wilde; Tommy Noble; A. E. Coleby; Arthur Rooke
- Release date: 1917
- Country: United Kingdom

A Pit Boy's Romance is a 1917 British silent drama film directed by A. E. Coleby and Arthur Rooke and starring Jimmy Wilde, Tommy Noble and Arthur Rooke. The film ends with the villain's protégé losing a boxing match to the hero, a plot similar to that of Coleby's film of the previous year Kent, the Fighting Man.

== Bibliography ==
- Low, Rachael. The History of British Film: Volume III, 1914-1918. Routledge, 2001.
