= 1901 in the United Kingdom =

Events from the year 1901 in the United Kingdom. This year marks the transition from the Victorian to the Edwardian era, with the death of the 81-year-old Queen and the accession of her 59-year-old son.

== Incumbents ==
- Monarch – Victoria (until 22 January), Edward VII (starting 22 January)
- Prime Minister – Robert Gascoyne-Cecil, 3rd Marquess of Salisbury (Coalition)

== Events ==
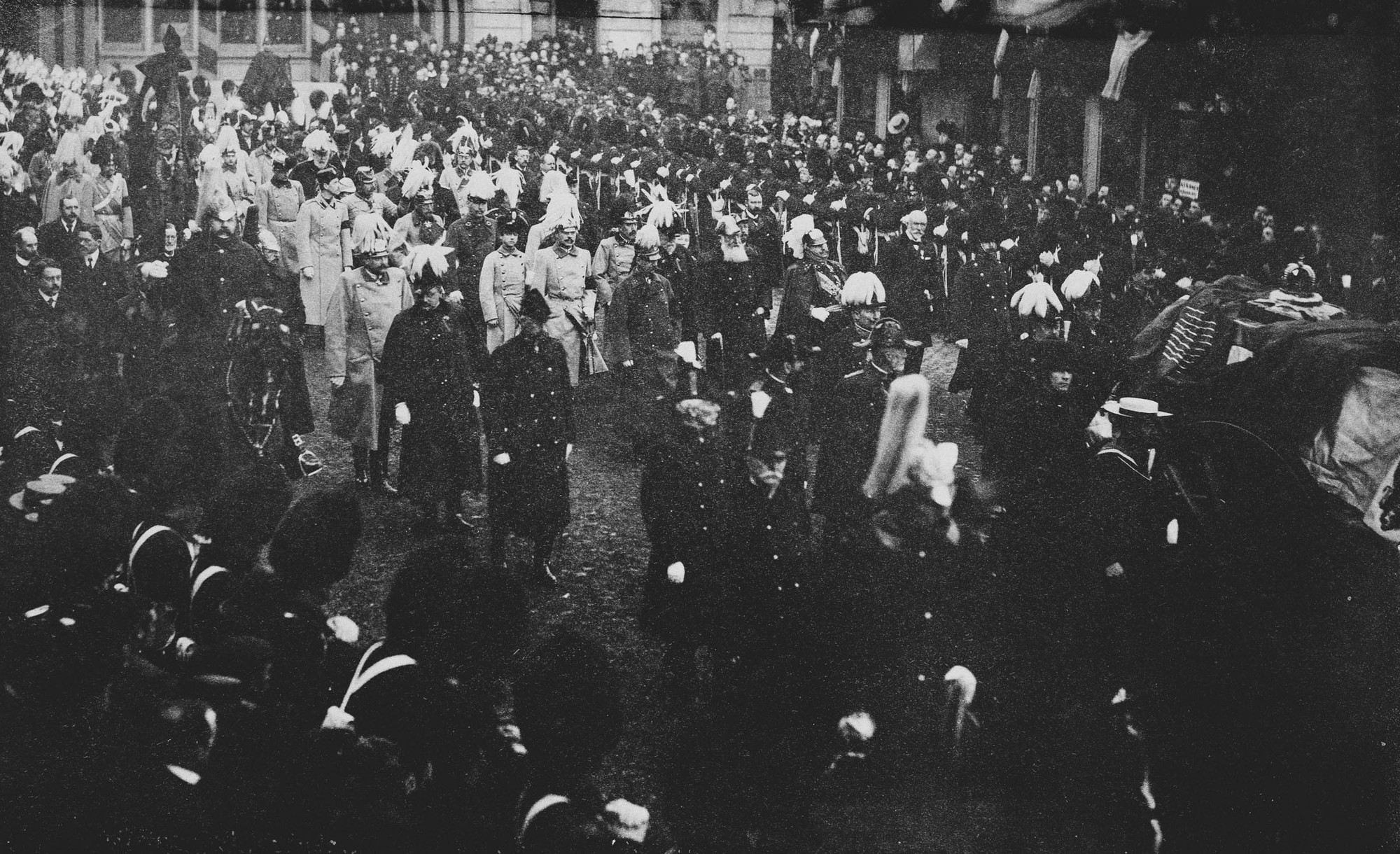
Queen Victoria's funeral procession

- 1 January
  - The British colonies of New South Wales, Queensland, South Australia, Tasmania, Victoria and Western Australia federate as the Commonwealth of Australia. Edmund Barton becomes the first Australian Prime Minister.
  - Nigeria becomes a British protectorate.
- 19 January – Queen Victoria is reported to be seriously ill.
- 22 January – Queen Victoria dies at Osborne House on the Isle of Wight. She was 81 years old and has served as monarch for nearly 64 years – the only longer reigning British monarch will be Queen Elizabeth II. Victoria's eldest son, Albert Edward, Prince of Wales, becomes King, reigning as Edward VII.
- 23 January – Guglielmo Marconi sends a wireless communication 299 km (186 mi) 'over the horizon' from Niton on the Isle of Wight to The Lizard in Cornwall.
- 2 February – The funeral of Queen Victoria takes place at St George's Chapel, Windsor Castle. It is attended by many European royals, including Kaiser Wilhelm II and Archduke Franz Ferdinand of Austria.
- 14 February – Edward VII opens his first parliament.
- 18 February – Winston Churchill makes his maiden speech in the House of Commons, concerning the Boer War.
- 21 February – The Apollo Theatre opens in Shaftesbury Avenue, London.
- 5 March – Police eject jeering Irish nationalist demonstrators from the House of Commons.
- 12 March – The Whitechapel Art Gallery opens in London.
- 16 March–1 November – The Duke and Duchess of Cornwall and York (the future King George V and Queen Mary) make a tour of the British Empire in RMS Ophir sailing as a Royal Yacht.
- 31 March – The 1901 UK Census is held. The number of people employed in manufacturing is at its highest-ever recorded level.
- 26 April – First meeting of the Engineering Standards Committee, predecessor of the BSI Group.
- 2 May–4 November – Glasgow International Exhibition.
- 16 May – TS King Edward is launched at William Denny and Brothers' shipyard in Dumbarton. The first commercial merchant vessel propelled by steam turbines, she enters excursion service on the Firth of Clyde on 1 July.
- 18 May – Alexandra Palace opens to the public in London.
- 29 June – Horniman Museum in Forest Hill is opened to the public by founder Frederick Horniman as a gift 'to the people in perpetuity'.
- 1 July – The first UK Fingerprint Bureau is established at Scotland Yard, the Metropolitan Police headquarters in London, by Edward Henry.
- 12 July – Maidenhead enters the UK Weather Records with the highest sixty-minute total rainfall at 92mm. As of April 2021 this record remains.
- 22 July
  - The House of Lords rules in the Taff Vale case that trade unions can be held liable for damages caused by members.
  - British congress on tuberculosis opens.
- 5 August
  - Britain's first permanent cinema opens in Islington, London.
  - Victoria, Princess Royal, Empress Dowager of Prussia and elder sister of the King, dies aged 60 at Friedrichshof in Germany.
- 6 August – Discovery Expedition: Robert Falcon Scott sets sail on the barque-rigged auxiliary steamship Discovery from The Solent to explore the Ross Sea in Antarctica; the ship, launched on 21 March in Dundee, is the last traditional wooden three-masted ship to be built in the UK (and becomes the first Royal Research Ship in 1923).
- 17 August – The Factory and Workshop Act raises the minimum working age to twelve years and extends legislation regarding the education of working children, employee's meal times, and provision of fire escapes.
- 30 August – Engineer Hubert Cecil Booth patents the electrically powered vacuum cleaner.
- 7 September – The United Kingdom is amongst the signatories of the Boxer Protocol ending the Boxer Rebellion in China.
- October – First performance of Edward Elgar's Pomp and Circumstance March No. 1, in Liverpool.
- 2 October – The Royal Navy's first submarine, Holland 1, is launched at Barrow-in-Furness.
- 29 October – The Aero Club of the United Kingdom is established.
- 9 November – The Prince George, Duke of Cornwall and York (later George V) becomes Prince of Wales and Earl of Chester. This is the only time in British history that the titles of Prince of Wales and Duke of York are held by the same man.
- 13 November – Caister lifeboat disaster: Life-boat Beauchamp capsizes on service off Caister-on-Sea, Norfolk, during a major storm: nine of the twelve crew on board are killed. This gives ride to the lifeboatmen's motto "Never turn back."
- 18 November – The United Kingdom and the United States sign the Hay–Pauncefote Treaty allowing the U.S. to build a canal through Panama under its sole control.
- 30 November – Frank Hornby of Liverpool is granted a patent for the construction toy that will become Meccano.
- 12 December – Guglielmo Marconi receives the first trans-Atlantic radio signal, sent from Poldhu in Cornwall to Newfoundland, the letter "S" in Morse.
- 22 December – Charles Aked, a Baptist minister in Liverpool, protests about the Second Boer War concentration camps. A crowd follows him home and breaks the windows of his house.

=== Undated ===
- Imperial Tobacco founded by W. H. Wills.
- Electric trams introduced in London and Portsmouth.
- The first codified rules of netball are published.

=== Ongoing events ===
- Second Boer War (1899–1902)

== Publications ==
- Dictionary of National Biography concludes publication.
- Patrick S. Dinneen's novel Cormac Ó Conaill, the first in Irish to be published complete in book form.
- Thomas Hardy's collection Poems of the Past and the Present.
- Rudyard Kipling's novel Kim.
- Seebohm Rowntree's survey of York Poverty, A Study of Town Life.
- H. G. Wells' novel The First Men in the Moon and his collected articles on futurology Anticipations of the Reaction of Mechanical and Scientific Progress Upon Human Life and Thought.

== Births ==
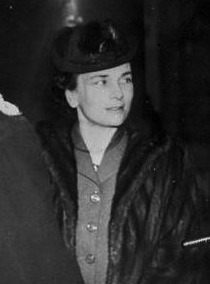
Princess Alice, Duchess of Gloucester

- 3 February – Rosamond Lehmann, novelist (died 1990)
- 10 February – Delia de Leon, Panamanian-born actress (died 1993)
- 13 February – Lewis Grassic Gibbon, Scottish writer (died 1935)
- 15 February – Kenneth Callow, biochemist (died 1983)
- 19 February – Florence Green, Royal Air Force member, last surviving World War I veteran (died 2012)
- 3 March – Claude Choules, last surviving World War I combat veteran from England (died 2011)
- 7 April
  - Stella Mary Newton, fashion designer (died 2001)
  - Christopher Wood, painter (suicide 1930)
- 12 April – Thomas Sharp, urban planner (died 1978)
- 15 April – Joe Davis, snooker and billiards player (died 1978)
- 19 April – Edith Summerskill, physician, feminist, Labour politician and campaigner (died 1980)
- 23 May – Edmund Rubbra, composer (died 1986)
- 1 June – John Van Druten, dramatist (died 1957 in the United States)
- 9 June – John Skeaping, sculptor and equine painter (died 1980)
- 10 June – Eric Maschwitz, lyricist and broadcast executive (died 1969)
- 12 June – Norman Hartnell, fashion designer (died 1979)
- 17 June – F. F. E. Yeo-Thomas, World War II hero (died 1964)
- 23 June – Richard Ripley, 400 m runner (died 1996)
- 9 July – Barbara Cartland, novelist (died 2000)
- 13 July
  - Reginald Goodall, conductor (died 1990)
  - Eric Portman, film actor (died 1969)
- 20 July – Dilys Powell, film critic (died 1995)
- 29 August – Anna Zinkeisen, Scottish-born artist (died 1976)
- 15 September
  - Donald Bailey, engineer (died 1985)
  - Sylvia Crowe, landscape architect (died 1997)
- 4 September – William Lyons, automobile engineer and designer, founder of Jaguar Cars (died 1985)
- 9 September – James Blades, orchestral percussionist (died 1999)
- 17 September – Francis Chichester, aviator and sailor (died 1972)
- 20 September – Tolchard Evans, composer (died 1978)
- 4 October – Adrian Bell, rural writer and crossword compiler (died 1980)
- 1 November – Cecil Jackson-Cole, humanitarian (died 1979)
- 6 November – Kathleen Mary Drew-Baker, phycologist (died 1957)
- 17 November – Joyce Wethered, golfer (died 1997)
- 28 November – Edwina Mountbatten, Countess Mountbatten of Burma, née Ashley (died 1960)
- 28 November – Roy Urquhart, major-general (died 1988)
- 1 December – Charles Tunnicliffe, wildlife painter (died 1979)
- 25 December – Princess Alice, Duchess of Gloucester (died 2004)
- 26 December – Victor Hely-Hutchinson, composer (died 1947)
- 27 December – Stanley Hayter, printmaker (died 1988 in France)

== Deaths ==
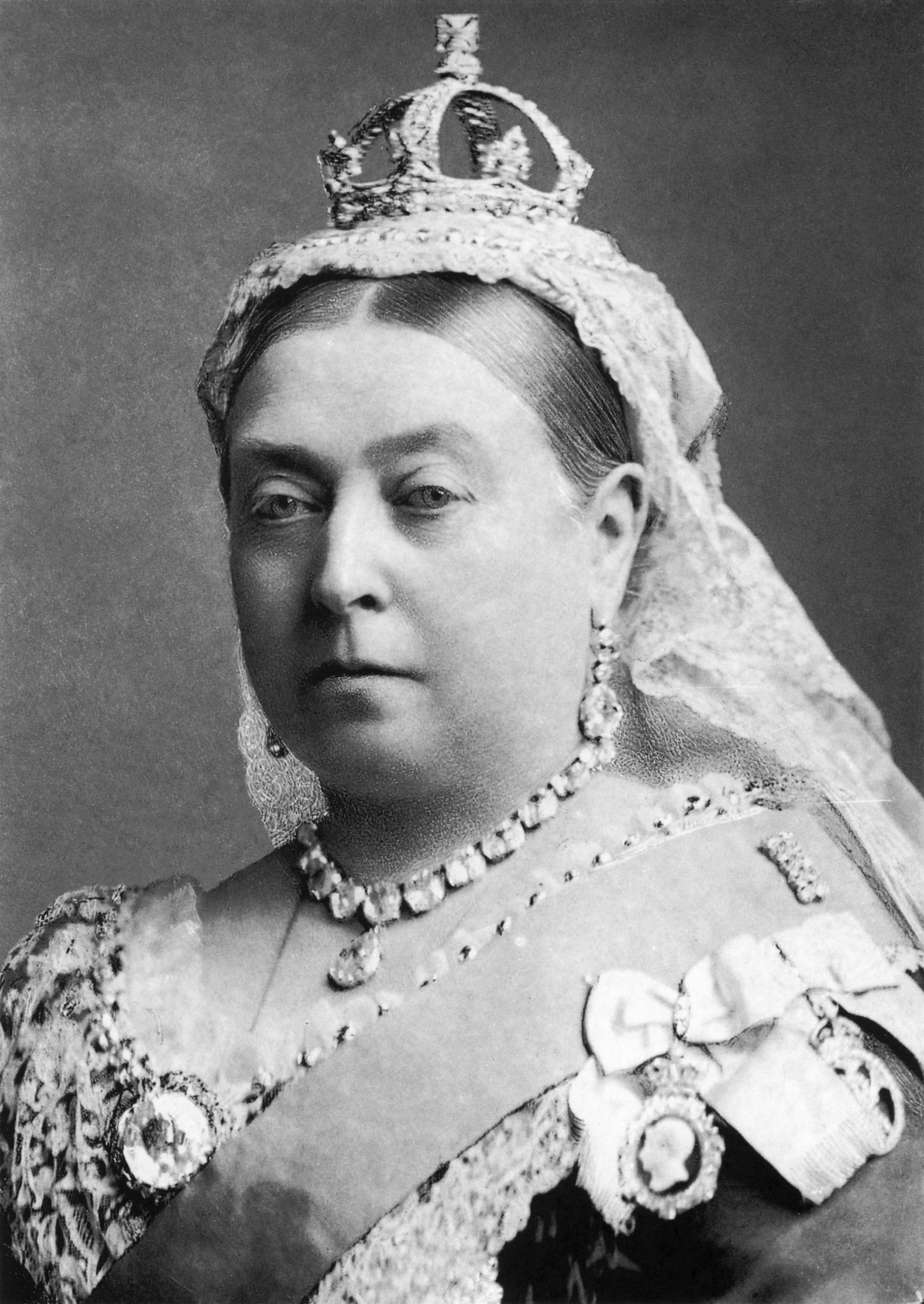
Queen Victoria

- 8 January – John Barry, Irish soldier, Victoria Cross recipient (born 1873)
- 14 January – Mandell Creighton, Bishop of London (died in office) (born 1843)
- 22 January – Queen Victoria (born 1819)
- 11 February – Henry Willis, organ builder (born 1821)
- 21 February – Henry Peach Robinson, photographer (born 1830)
- 6 March – John Jabez Edwin Mayall, photographer (born 1813
- 31 March – Sir John Stainer, composer and organist (born 1840)
- 3 April – Richard D'Oyly Carte, theatrical impresario (born 1844)
- 13 April – Sir Edward Watkin, politician and railway entrepreneur (born 1819)
- 15 April – Francis Baker, cricketer (born 1847)
- 21 May – Sir John Commerell, admiral of the fleet (born 1829)
- 24 May – Charlotte Mary Yonge, novelist (born 1823)
- 9 June – Sir Walter Besant, novelist and historian (born 1836)
- 5 August
  - Alfred Heaver, property developer (murdered) (born 1841)
  - Victoria, Princess Royal, eldest daughter of Queen Victoria (born 1840)
- 6 November – Kate Greenaway, children's book illustrator and writer (born 1846)
- 13 November – Sir William Houston Stewart, admiral (born 1822)
- 30 November – Edward John Eyre, explorer (born 1815)
- 1 December – George Lohmann, English cricketer (tuberculosis) (born 1865)
- 23 December – Edward Onslow Ford, sculptor (born 1852)

== See also ==
- List of British films before 1920
