= The Golden Dawn (film) =

1921 film

- Directed by: Ralph Dewsbury
- Written by: Bannister Merwin
- Starring: Gertrude McCoy; Warwick Ward; Frank Petley; Mary Brough
- Cinematography: Silvano Balboni
- Production company: Ralph Dewsbury Productions
- Distributed by: Pathé Pictures International
- Release date: September 1921
- Running time: 5,000 feet
- Country: United Kingdom
- Languages: Silent; English intertitles

The Golden Dawn is a 1921 British silent crime film directed by Ralph Dewsbury and starring Gertrude McCoy, Warwick Ward and Frank Petley. An actress falls in love with a blind man.

== Cast ==
- Gertrude McCoy as Nancy Brett
- Warwick Ward as Dick Landon
- Frank Petley as Henry Warville
- Sydney Fairbrother as Mrs. Briggs
- Mary Brough as Mrs. Powers
- Philip Hewland as Inspector Martin
- Charles Pelly as Charles Proctor
- Charles Vane as Jim Briggs

== Bibliography ==
- Low, Rachael. History of the British Film, 1918–1929. George Allen & Unwin, 1971.
