= Amy Brandon Thomas =

British actress (1890–1974)

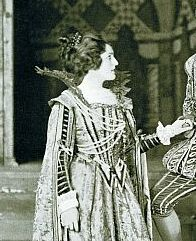
- Thomas as Lady Drake in Drake (1912)
- Born: Amy Marguerite Brandon-Thomas; 9 March 1890; London, UK
- Died: 6 May 1974 (aged 84); London, UK
- Years active: 1907–1935

Amy Marguerite Brandon Thomas (9 March 1890 – 6 May 1974) was an English film and stage actress. She was the daughter of the playwright Brandon Thomas. She is also known as Amy Brandon-Thomas.

== Life and career ==
Amy Brandon Thomas was born in London, the daughter of the playwright Brandon Thomas and his wife Marguerite, and was educated privately. She married William Deane Barnes-Brand.

Thomas joined the stage professionally in 1907, playing Alice Ormerod in A Lancashire Sailor at the Theatre Royal, Preston, where she also played Ela Delahay in her father's comedy, Charley's Aunt. She appeared in London that Christmas at the New Royalty Theatre in the same two plays, although this time she played Kitty Verdun in Charley's Aunt. She was next seen at the Garrick Theatre in 1908, as Lucy Lorirner in A Pair of Spectacles, with Sir John Hare, subsequently touring with him. In 1909 she was at the Royal Court Theatre in London as Kate Dalliscm in Strangers Within the Gates and then toured with Johnston Forbes-Robertson as Vivien O' Hussy in The Passing of the Third Floor Back at the Haymarket Theatre. That Christmas, she was Barbara Tracy in Might is Right. In 1910, she first played Portia in The Merchant of Venice at the Court Theatre, then appearing at His Majesty's Theatre with Sir Herbert Beerbohm Tree as Olivia in Twelfth Night, then touring as Portia with Arthur Phillips's company. That autumn, she was at the Lyceum Theatre, London, as Millie Anderson in The Sins of London, finishing the year at the London Pavilion as Nan in Good for Nothing. The next year, she was at Wyndham's Theatre as Lady Margaret Beauchamp in Mr. Jarvis and later at the Palace Theatre as Odette in The Choice.

In 1912, she was back at His Majesty's, playing Elizabeth Sydenham in Drake. The next year, at the Theatre Royal, Drury Lane, she reprised the role of Vivien in The Passing of the Third Floor Back. Then, at His Majesty's, she again played Olivia in Twelfth Night. In the Autumn, at the New Theatre, Manchester, she was Renee de Cochefordt in Under the Red Robe. In 1914, she played Mabel Chiltern in An Ideal Husband at the St. James's Theatre. Then, at His Majesty's, she reappeared as Elizabeth Sydenham in Drake. The next year, she was Madame Pasquier de la Man in Peter Ibbetson. In 1916, at the Comedy Theatre, she played in Half-Past Eight. In 1917, at the Haymarket, she played Evelyn Garland in Felix Gets a Month, ending the year at the St. James's in Charley's Aunt, again as Kitty. The next year, she was at the Queen's Theatre as Marion Fenton in Lot 79 and at the Lyric Theatre as Valentine Boudet in The Purple Mask. In 1919, at the Garrick, she played Mary Willmore in The Purse Strings. She had engagements in variety theatres during 1920 in The Odds. In 1921, she was back at St. James's as Lady Emma Jones in Emma. The next year at the Ambassadors' Theatre, she was Lady Eleanor Davys in Charles I, ending the year as Lady Mabel in The Secret Agent at the Prince of Wales's Theatre. In 1923, she was Lady Amy Ducksworth in So This Is London. Later roles included Sue in Is Zat So? at the Apollo Theatre (1926) and Lady Featherstone in Blue Eyes at the Piccadilly Theatre (1928).

Beginning during World War I, and until the 1930s, she made several films, most notably as the defending counsel in Alfred Hitchcock's Murder! Thomas enjoyed reading, sewing and motoring.

In later life, Thomas and her husband lived in Surrey, where the architect Oliver Hill designed two houses for them: Woodhouse Copse in Holmbury St Mary, built in 1926, and Burrows Wood in Gomshall in 1939. He also built them a house for speculative (resale) purposes, Raikes Hollow in Abinger, in 1930. Thomas discovered an interest in gardening after Hill introduced her to garden designer Gertrude Jekyll. She became a frequent visitor to Jekyll's house, Munstead Wood, and Jekyll designed the planting for the gardens at Woodhouse Copse.

Her husband William Deane Barnes-Brand died on 30 December 1945. Oliver Hill carried out the remodelling of Madgehole Farm, Shamley Green, for her around 1957. She died in London in 1974 at the age of 84.

== Selected filmography ==
- Partners at Last (1916)
- The Profligate (1917)
- The Cry for Justice (1919)
- The English Rose (1920)
- At the Villa Rose (1930)
- Murder! (1930)
- Java Head (1934)
- Vintage Wine (1935)
