= A Soldier's Courtship =

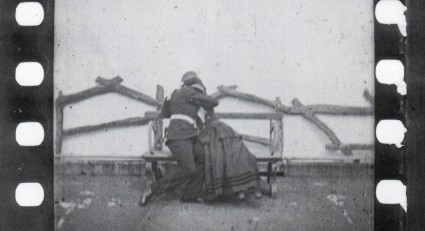
- Directed by: R.W. Paul
- Produced by: R.W. Paul
- Starring: Fred Storey, Julia Seale
- Cinematography: R.W. Paul
- Release date: 1896

A Soldier's Courtship is an 1896 British short silent drama film that was directed by R.W. Paul. It depicts a woman sitting on a bench, who is later approached by a soldier. At first, the woman refuses the soldier's advance on her, but later, they are kissing each other very excitedly.

== Legacy ==
The Natural Science and Media Museum of England said that the film was "Britain’s, and arguably the world’s, first fiction film."

== Lost film ==
The Soldier's Courtship was originally a lost film, but was later discovered in the Centro Sperimentale di Cinematografia in Rome and was premiered at the Pordenone silent film festival in October 2011.
