= Chappell Dossett =

British actor (1883–1961)

- Born: 1 January 1883; London, United Kingdom
- Died: 19 December 1961 (aged 78); Los Angeles, California, United States
- Occupation: Actor
- Years active: 1914–1936 (film)

Chappell Dossett (1883–1961) was a British stage and film actor.

== Selected filmography ==
- The King's Outcast (1915)
- Charity Ann (1915)
- Partners at Last (1916)
- Judge Not (1920)
- The Cowboy and the Countess (1926)
- Name the Woman (1928)
- The Mysterious Dr. Fu Manchu (1929)
- Madame X (1929)

== Bibliography ==
- Hanke, Ken. A Critical Guide to Horror Film Series. Routledge, 2013.
