= Philip Hewland =

British actor (1876–1953)

Philip Hewland (12 December 1876, Gravesend, Kent, England – 1953, Ealing, London) was a British actor. He had one son, Ivor, and a granddaughter, Domini.

== Selected filmography ==
- The Christian (1915)
- His Daughter's Dilemma (1916)
- Arsène Lupin (1916)
- The Manxman (1916)
- The March Hare (1919)
- I Will (1919)
- Whosoever Shall Offend (1919)
- Not Guilty (1919)
- Lady Tetley's Decree (1920)
- The Scarlet Kiss (1920)
- Duke's Son (1920)
- The Breed of the Treshams (1920)
- Kissing Cup's Race (1920)
- The Golden Dawn (1921)
- Dangerous Lies (1921)
- In Full Cry (1921)
- Her Penalty (1921)
- A Couple of Down and Outs (1923)
- The Money Habit (1924)
- The Guns of Loos (1928)
- Love's Option (1928)
- Alf's Carpet (1929)
- Harmony Heaven (1930)
- Tons of Money (1930)
- Glamour (1931)
- The Sleeping Cardinal (1931)
- Many Waters (1931)
- The Missing Rembrandt (1932)
- Marooned (1933)
- Murder by Rope (1936)
