= Everybody's Business =

1917 film

- Directed by: Ralph Dewsbury
- Written by: Frank Powell
- Starring: Norman McKinnel; Gerald du Maurier; Matheson Lang
- Release date: June 1917
- Country: United Kingdom
- Language: English

Everybody's Business is a 1917 British silent drama film directed by Ralph Dewsbury and starring Norman McKinnel, Gerald du Maurier and Matheson Lang.

== Cast ==
- Norman McKinnel as John Briton
- Gerald du Maurier as Tom Briton
- Matheson Lang as Lieutenant Jack Goudron
- Renee Kelly as Mabel Briton
- Kate Rorke as Mrs. Briton
- Gwynne Herbert as Cook
- Edward O'Neill as Mr. Keen

== Bibliography ==
- Low, Rachael. History of the British Film, 1914-1918. Routledge, 2005.
