= Ben Webster (actor) =

English actor (1864–1947)

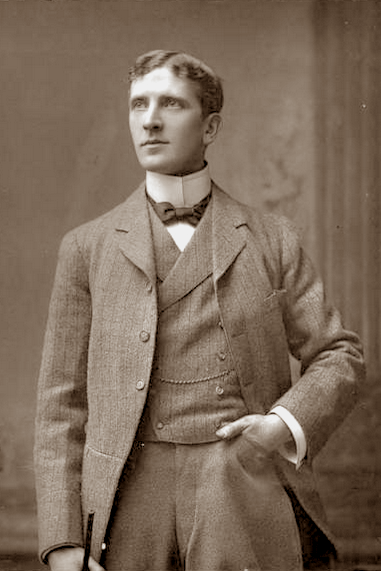
- Webster in 1893
- Born: Benjamin Webster; 2 June 1864; London, England
- Died: 26 February 1947 (aged 82); Hollywood, California, U.S.
- Occupations: Actor, barrister
- Years active: 1887–1947
- Spouse: May Whitty (m. 1892)
- Children: 2, including Margaret
- Relatives: Benjamin Nottingham Webster (grandfather)

Benjamin Webster (2 June 1864 – 26 February 1947) was an English actor, the husband of the actress May Whitty, and father of the actress and director Margaret Webster. After a long career on the English stage, Webster, together with his wife, moved to Hollywood, where they made numerous films in their later years.

== Life and career ==
=== Stage career ===
Webster was born on 2 June 1864 in London. His father, William Shakespeare Webster, was the son of the actor Benjamin Nottingham Webster. He was destined for the legal profession; after studying he became a practising barrister, but he appeared for a few performances with John Hare and W. H. Kendal in A Scrap of Paper and As You Like It, and was successful enough to be offered an engagement with them in 1887. He made his professional debut at the St James's Theatre on 3 March 1887, as Lord Woodstock in Clancarty, and subsequently toured as Octave in The Ironmaster. In 1888 he appeared under the managements of Willie Edouin in Katti, Run Wild, Charles Wyndham in Betsy, and Henry Irving as Malcolm in Macbeth.

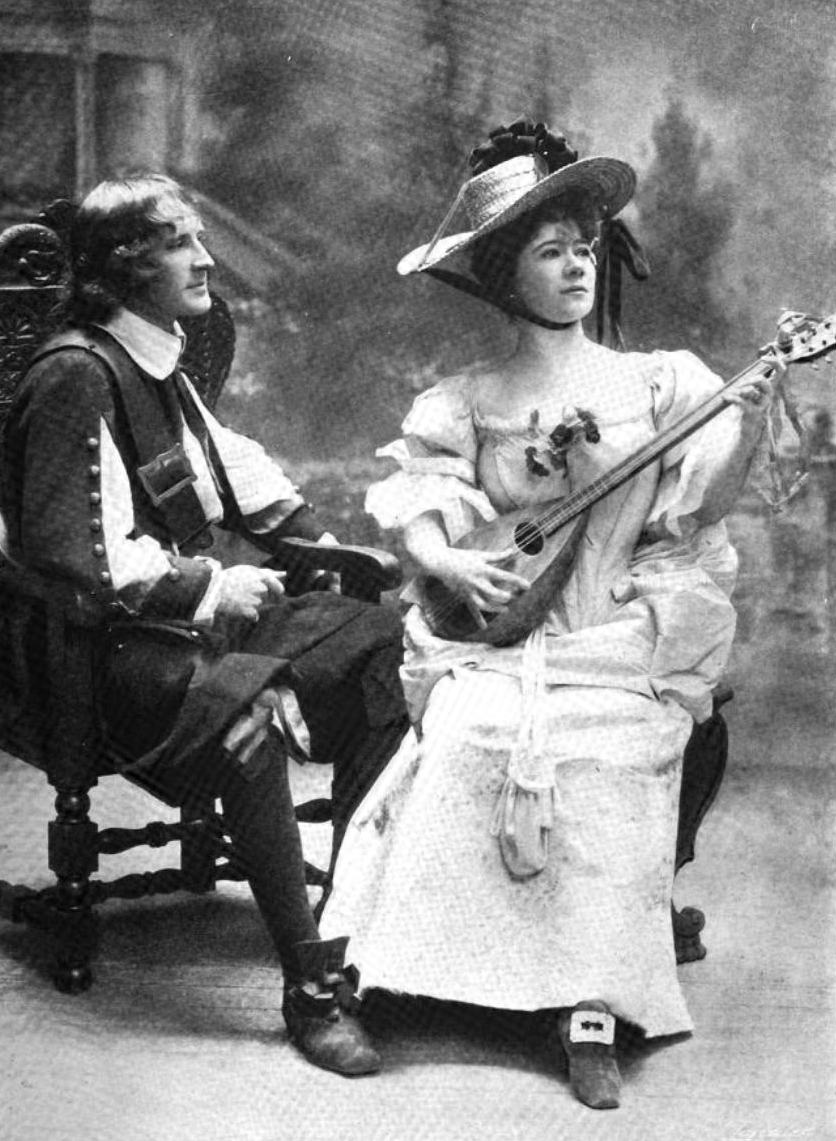
Webster as Simon Dale opposite Marie Tempest in English Nell, 1900

In the early 1890s he appeared in George Alexander's company, first at the Avenue Theatre and then at the St James's. Among many others he created roles in Lady Windermere's Fan, Liberty Hall and The Second Mrs Tanqueray. In 1892 he married the actress May Whitty in St Giles's-in-the-Fields Church, London. They had two children: a son who died in infancy and a daughter, Margaret, who became a stage director. Webster rejoined Irving for a tour of America in 1895–96, and remained with him at the Lyceum until 1898, playing Guiderius in Cymbeline, Hastings in Richard III, Comte de Neipperg in Madame Sans-Gêne among other parts. In 1898 he toured with Ellen Terry, playing Cassio in Othello, and Beauseant in The Lady of Lyons.

In the first decade of the 20th century his roles ranged from modern comedies and serious dramas, ranging from George D'Alroy in Caste to the title role in Euripides' Hippolytus, plays by Wilde and Shaw, as well as swashbuckling pieces such as The Prisoner of Zenda with Alexander. In the latter part of 1907 he accompanied Mrs Patrick Campbell on her American tour; he played the male leads in The Second Mrs Tanqueray, Magda, Hedda Gabler, The Notorious Mrs Ebbsmith, Electra and other pieces.

Between 1910 and 1920 his roles ranged from Torvald Helmer in A Doll's House to the Caliph Abdallah in Kismet, the Captain in Androcles and the Lion, Tom Wrench in Trelawny of the Wells and George Marsden in Mr Pim Passes By. In the 1920s he played more than 20 stage roles, mostly in the West End, but also in a tour of South Africa in 1928 with Zena Dare, playing in The High Road, The Trial of Mary Dugan, The Squeaker, and Aren't We All?.

In the 1930s he was more frequently seen in classics and other costume dramas, in roles including Richard de Beauchamp in Saint Joan, the Duke of Venice in Othello, the Duke of Venice in The Merchant of Venice, the Duke of Lancaster in Richard of Bordeaux and Egeus in A Midsummer Night's Dream.

=== Films ===
Webster acted in films for 30 years from 1913 to 1943. In the late 1930s he and Whitty emigrated to California, where they remained based until their deaths. His films included The House of Temperley (1913); Liberty Hall (1914); Enoch Arden (1914); Cynthia in the Wilderness (1916); The Vicar of Wakefield (1916); His Daughter's Dilemma (1916); The Gay Lord Quex (1917); 12.10 (1919); Miriam Rozella (1924); The Lyons Mail (1931); One Precious Year (1933); The Old Curiosity Shop (1934); Drake of England (1935); Eliza Comes to Stay (1936); Forever and a Day (1943); and Lassie Come Home (1943) as Dan'l Fadden.

Webster died in Hollywood from complications during surgery for a cancerous tumour on 26 February 1947, aged 82. His wife died 14 months later. Webster was cremated and his ashes scattered in Woolacombe, Devon, England. Ben, May and Margaret have neighbouring memorial plaques in St. Paul's, Covent Garden, London, known as "The Actors Church".

== References and sources ==
=== Sources ===
- Parker, John, ed. (1939). Who's Who in the Theatre (ninth ed.). London: Sir Isaac Pitman and Sons. OCLC 473894893.
