= The March Hare (1919 film) =

1919 film

- Directed by: Frank Miller
- Written by: Guy Newall; Frank Miller
- Produced by: George Clark
- Starring: Godfrey Tearle; Ivy Duke; Will Corrie; Philip Hewland
- Cinematography: Bert Ford
- Production company: Lucky Cat
- Distributed by: Ideal Film Company
- Release date: August 1919
- Running time: 5 reels
- Country: United Kingdom
- Languages: Silent; English intertitles

The March Hare is a 1919 British silent comedy film directed by Frank Miller and starring Godfrey Tearle, Ivy Duke and Will Corrie. The screenplay was written by Guy Newall as a vehicle for his wife Ivy Duke.

== Cast ==
- Godfrey Tearle as Guy
- Ivy Duke as Ivy
- Will Corrie
- Philip Hewland
- Lewis Gilbert
- Douglas Heathcote
- Percy Crawford
- Peggy Maurice
- John Miller

== Bibliography ==
- Bamford, Kentom. Distorted Images: British National Identity and Film in the 1920s. I.B. Tauris, 1999.
- Low, Rachael. History of the British Film, 1918-1929. George Allen & Unwin, 1971.
