= Harold Weston =

American painter (1894–1972)

- Harold Weston, Self-Portrait, 1923, oil on canvas.
- Born: February 14, 1894; Merion, Pennsylvania
- Died: April 10, 1972 (aged 78); New York City, New York
- Movement: American modernism; American Realism; Abstraction

Harold Weston (February 14, 1894 – April 10, 1972) was an American modernist painter, based for many years in the Adirondack Mountains, whose work moved from expressionism to realism to abstraction. He was collected by Duncan Phillips (now the Phillips Collection), widely exhibited in the 1920s and 1930s, and painted murals under the Treasury Relief Art Project for the General Services Administration. In later life he was known for his humanitarian food relief work during World War II and his arts advocacy that led to the passage of the National Endowment for the Arts and Humanities Act of 1965. Weston's most recent museum exhibition was at the Shelburne Museum in Vermont, and his most recent gallery exhibition was at Gerald Peters Gallery in New York City.

== Early life and education ==
Harold Weston was born February 14, 1894, in Merion, Pennsylvania, to Mary Hartshorne Weston, a pianist, and S. Burns Weston, the founder of the Ethical Culture Society in Philadelphia, who gave Weston an "integrity of purpose." Summers were spent by the family in the Adirondack Mountains in the company of the intellectual descendants of the American transcendentalists, for whom nature, aesthetics, and spirituality were fundamentally linked.

At the age of 15, Weston spent a year traveling in Europe and attending school in Switzerland and Germany, continuing to paint and draw in his sketchbooks while in Europe. After his return to the United States, Weston was stricken by polio in 1911, a chance occurrence that sealed his determination to be an artist. His left leg was paralyzed, and doctors said that he would never walk again. Through a regime of physical conditioning and the use of leg braces and a cane, Weston did learn how to walk and hike again, using his arms to hold onto trees as he went up and down mountains.

Weston entered Harvard University in 1912 and graduated magna cum laude with a degree in fine arts in 1916. He served as editor of the Harvard Lampoon, contributing a large number of cartoons and artworks to the magazine. In 1914, he studied under the American painter Hamilton Easter Field at the Summer School of Graphic Arts in Ogunquit, Maine.

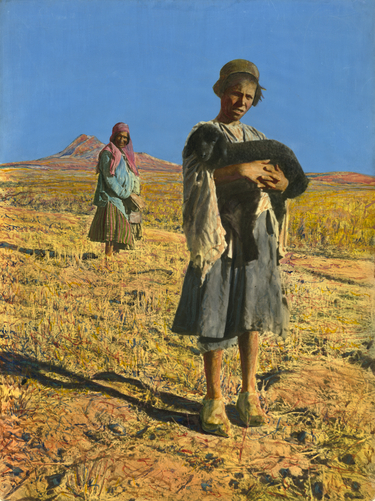
"A Gift Lamb from a Persian Potentate,” hand-painted photograph by Harold Weston, National Geographic Magazine, 1921.

== Early career and World War I ==
Many people believed that the global crisis of World War I would lead to a spiritual regeneration, and Weston wanted to be in the midst of that, "to literally see the heart of humanity laid bare." Unable to enlist due to his paralysis, and before the U.S. entered the war, he volunteered with the YMCA from 1916 to 1919, serving as a liaison with the British Army in Baghdad in the Ottoman Empire, attending to the mental wellbeing of 400,000 troops. In addition to arranging lectures, cinema, concerts, and tournaments, he encouraged soldiers to draw and paint, and organized the Baghdad Art Club to exhibit and promote the soldiers' art. He was appointed Official Painter for the British Army in 1918.

Weston's years in the Middle East had a lasting impact on both his art and social activism. The colors and light of the desert, so unlike the rich greens and blues of the Adirondacks, deeply affected his palette. Weston also witnessed the horror of famine and disease while in the Middle East. He saw men, women, and children die of heat exhaustion and starvation. In the summer of 1917, he reported 400 people a day dying from heat that rose to 128 degrees F in the shade. Weston wrote about some of his experiences for the National Geographic Magazine in April 1921, which included his photographs that he color tinted.

In late 1919 Weston returned to the United States via a caravan east to India, and then by ship with a layover in Japan. For five months he contributed social work while living in an immigrant settlement house in New York City, took classes at the Art Students League of New York, explored the city's art galleries, and became acquainted with the latest in modern art reaching American shores.

== Early Adirondack landscapes ==
Harold Weston sketching on top of Marcy Mountain, photograph by Esther B. Weston, 1922.

Harold Weston, Clouds—Upper Ausable Lake, 1922, oil on canvas. Frame hand-carved by Weston.

In May 1920 Weston left the city for the Adirondack Mountains to take nature as his teacher. Weston wrote: "Not yet sure just what paint can and cannot express. Do not want at present more of theory and feel must work it out with this great and ever changing source of inspiration about me." With the help of local carpenters, he built a one-room, uninsulated log cabin studio near St. Huberts, New York. For the next two years he lived largely in isolation, exploring the mountains and lakes, creating plein-air sketches in oil and pencil on small pieces of cardboard. In the studio he painted canvases based on those sketches. When he wasn't painting, he chopped wood, cooked on a small wood stove, wrote letters and journal entries prolifically, and listened to classical records on his Victrola phonograph.

Weston's first solo exhibition was at the Montross Gallery in New York City in November 1922. He showed over one hundred oil sketches from Persia and the Adirondacks and 63 oil paintings, each of which rested in one of Weston's hand-carved and gilded frames. Critics heaped praise on his vibrant use of color and the unique American perspective he brought to his work. The Christian Science Monitor wrote that the show was the highlight of the season: "In his pictures [there is] something different, something stirring and magnificently bold, a proclamation of a bigger belief in beauty than is usually heard in the galleries."

== Landscape Nudes ==
Harold Weston, Bending Nude, 1925, oil on canvas.

Weston met Faith Borton while giving a slide lecture about his experiences in Persia at Vassar College. He was impressed, and invited her along with his sister and friends to his cabin for a mid-winter party. Borton, raised Quaker in the suburbs of Philadelphia, was good-natured about the primitive experience in harsh winter weather. Hundreds of persuasive letters from Weston followed, until eight months later she relented. The couple was married on May 12, 1923.

For the first two and a half years of their marriage the Westons lived in the cabin studio—which now boasted indoor plumbing, a living room, and a bedroom—in the Adirondack Mountains. The period produced a significant change in Weston's work, that turned away from the landscape of nature toward the landscape of the human body.

The catalogue Wild Exuberance: Harold Weston's Adirondack Art describes the paintings: "The nudes deviated from a long tradition of beauty that aspired to perfection. These were no Botticelli or Titian Venuses, but cropped body parts painted as if with earth and flesh, whose primitive honesty complicated beauty with uncomfortably raw emotion and sex. These were not tame, pastoral scenes through which one could take a bourgeois stroll, but the wild. Unlike pretty nudes displayed for the male gaze, these were something more about the woman herself." The series of paintings came to be known as "landscape nudes" after John Marin said, "I feel the woods and the mountains in these nudes." Alfred Stieglitz considered the nudes daring and new, but they were too radical for the Montross Gallery to exhibit.

In August 1925, Harold Weston was hospitalized with a diseased kidney, which was removed, but he suffered a month of high fever before starting to pull out of it. Doctors advised him to paint less intensively and move away from the Adirondacks to a warmer, less stressful climate.

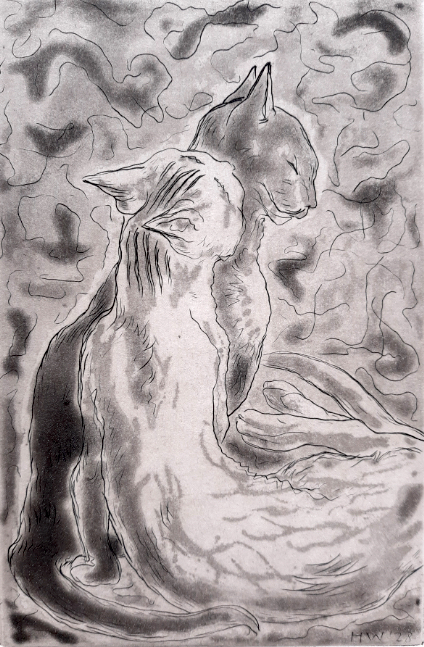
Harold Weston, Two Cats, 1928, etching on paper.

== Expatriates in France ==
The Westons visited the French Riviera in 1926, but contrary to doctors' orders settled in the rugged mountains in the French Pyrenees. They found an 11th-century farmhouse with a working chapel and bell tower in a farming community near Céret. The Westons bought a small wood stove to warm the room enough for posing in the nude. The painting of the new stove was the first purchase by Duncan Phillips, who went on to acquire the largest public collection of Westons at the Phillips Collection. "Quiet, simple, intimate and hard. It is a region very sympathetic to the pioneer in Harold. Suited to the Quaker in me," wrote Faith. The open fields and sunlight influenced Weston's palette, and his subjects broadened to include all manner of landscapes, figure painting, and still lifes in oil, watercolor, gouache, and etching.

At the Spanish sculptor Manolo's suggestion, the Westons went to Paris, France, to exhibit, and they became acquainted with painters working there. Captivated by etching, which was better suited to their small Parisian apartments, Weston experimented with the techniques of hard and soft ground, burin, dry point, and aquatint with and without brush. Weston exhibited his work in Paris, and also rolled-up canvases to ship back to New York City to be shown at the Montross Gallery.

They could not afford to live in Europe after the dollar weakened, and so after four productive years, the Westons—now with two small children—returned to America in 1930.

== The Depression ==
After living for a short period in Greenwich Village the Westons returned to their home and studio in the Adirondack mountains, again living simply. With a small family, he focused increasingly on the everyday: a quilt, plants in the garden, snowshoes.

Weston turned out prodigious amounts of artwork in the 1930s. His work was shown frequently in solo and group shows at galleries and museums, including the Phillips Memorial Gallery, the Art Institute of Chicago, and the Museum of Modern Art. His painting Green Hat won third prize in painting at the Golden Gate International Exposition in San Francisco in 1939. Duncan Phillips invited Weston to speak at his gallery several times. "We need you in this course of Gallery discussions for there is no man now painting better able to discuss color as an instrument of emotional expression and of plastic design," Phillips wrote to Weston.

In 1935 Weston competed for a Treasury Relief Art Project mural commission to paint murals depicting the government's efforts to speed the end of the Great Depression. For two-and-a-half years Weston worked 11 hours a day creating 840 square feet of 22 panels on canvas that were hung in the General Services Administration building in Washington, D.C., in 1938. At a time of intensive mural-painting in the country, Phillips said Weston's murals were "magnificent--the best by far of all the government murals."

Harold Weston, Supply Branch of Procurement, the north wall of the General Services Administration mural, 1936-38, oil on canvas, 10' x 20'5".

== Relief work and World War II ==
Humanitarian concerns at the advent of World War II compelled Weston to give up painting. "For the first time in my life, something seemed more important to me than painting," wrote Weston. First, in the Adirondacks, he organized a branch and 11 chapters of the Committee to Defend America by Aiding the Allies. Then after Pearl Harbor, with memories of the starvation he had seen during the war in the Middle East, he moved to Washington, D.C., to advocate full-time for humanitarian food relief. He outlined a plan that he called the Reconstruction Service Committee, for which he obtained the support of Eleanor Roosevelt, and which eventually evolved into the United Nations Relief and Rehabilitation Administration. "[Weston] more than anyone else -- as Mrs. Eleanor Roosevelt has written me -- was responsible for the original conception and carrying through of UNRRA," wrote Lewis Mumford. UNRRA saved millions of lives after the war.

To support UNRRA's governmental work, Weston founded Food for Freedom, a coalition of civic, religious, labor, and farm organizations representing more than 60 million Americans that advocated for food aid for refugees in Europe and Asia. He became an expert on food policy and the politics of farm policy in the U.S. Weston wrote a manuscript about his experiences, "Battle of Bread," that is now housed in the Library of Congress.

After seven years and wishing to return to painting, Weston seized on the idea of painting the United Nations headquarters that were under construction in New York City. He worked on the painting series, "Building the United Nations," from 1949 to 1952, further refining his hyper-realistic style. The painting series now belongs to the Smithsonian American Art Museum.

== Post World War II life ==
=== Arts advocacy ===
In 1953, the Westons started renting a small railroad flat over an Italian bakery in Greenwich Village for a phase of their life that took them to the center of the art world in New York City. Weston was elected president of the Federation of Modern Painters and Sculptors, and launched the museum gift plan, a scheme by which donors paid artists for their work and then subsequently donated it to museums. He also joined the International Association of Plastic Arts (later the International Association of Art [IAA]) and, as a delegate, vice president, or president, attended all of the group's international meetings between 1954 in Venice and 1966 in Tokyo.

Along with Lloyd Goodrich and Lillian Gish, in 1955 Weston founded the National Council on Arts and Government, an artists' group that lobbied for government support of the arts and that gathered the support of over 50 national organizations representing all of the arts. Weston served many years as its vice president and president. The group won passage of the National Foundation on the Arts and the Humanities Act of 1965 creating the National Endowment for the Arts. Weston, "more than any other private individual played a key role in the improvement of our government's relation to the arts in our time," wrote Lloyd Goodrich.

Harold Weston, Rain Can Down (Stone Series #34), 1968, gouache on paper.

=== Realism to abstraction ===
In the years after the completion of "Building the United Nations," Weston gradually transitioned into abstraction while maintaining a precisionist style. A 1958 trip to the Isle of Rhodes in Greece was pivotal in introducing ocean motifs. Increasingly, he magnified nature's details, heightening its patterns and rhythms. He was excited by the new direction of his work, for which he had more time after the passage of the National Endowment for the Arts legislation in 1965. He painted his last significant body of work, the "Stone Series," from 1968 until his death in 1972, inspired by stones found on the Gaspé Peninsula in Canada.

In 1971, Harold Weston published Freedom in the Wilds: A Saga of the Adirondacks, which is out of print, but a third, expanded edition was published in 2008 under the title Freedom in the Wilds: An Artist in the Adirondacks. Linking artistic creativity to wilderness conservation, Weston wrote: "The poet, composer, visual artist, and all those who are creative by instinct...can sense from a single fern frond, a leaf, a stone, or the song of a bird, the quintessence of the kind of freedom a wilderness tract can convey."

Harold Weston died on April 10, 1972, in New York City.

Major posthumous museum exhibitions of Weston's work have been held at the Philadelphia Art Alliance, the Adirondack Museum (now called the Adirondack Experience), and the Shelburne Museum. Galleries showing Weston work have included Gerald Peters Gallery, D. Wigmore Fine Art, and Salander-O'Reilly Galleries.

== Honors ==
In appreciation of Weston's work on behalf of artists, he was elected an honorary member of the Society of American Graphic Artists (1964), the National Education Theater Association (1966), and the National Society of Mural Painters (1965). Weston received an award from the American Society of Contemporary Artists (1964), and in 1963 Weston was appointed a fellow of the World Academy of Art and Science for his humanitarian work during World War II. At the time there were 28 Nobel Prize winners and only two practicing artists: Yehudi Menuhin and Henry Moore. Believing there were not enough women in the academy, in 1970 Weston nominated Louise Nevelson to be a fellow.
