= His Daughter's Dilemma =

1916 film

- Directed by: Ralph Dewsbury
- Written by: Frank Powell
- Starring: Ben Webster; Manora Thew; Philip Hewland
- Production company: London Film Company
- Distributed by: Jury Films
- Release date: January 1916
- Country: United Kingdom
- Languages: Silent; English intertitles

His Daughter's Dilemma is a 1916 British silent drama film directed by Ralph Dewsbury and starring Ben Webster, Manora Thew and Philip Hewland.

== Cast ==
- Ben Webster as Bernard Venn
- Manora Thew as Madeleine Kingsley
- Philip Hewland as Dr. Mackenzie
- Gwynne Herbert as Lady Kingsley
- Hubert Willis as Sharp
- Christine Rayner as Rose Twining

== Bibliography ==
- Palmer Scott. British Film Actors' Credits, 1895-1987. McFarland, 1988.
