= Name the Woman (1928 film) =

1928 film

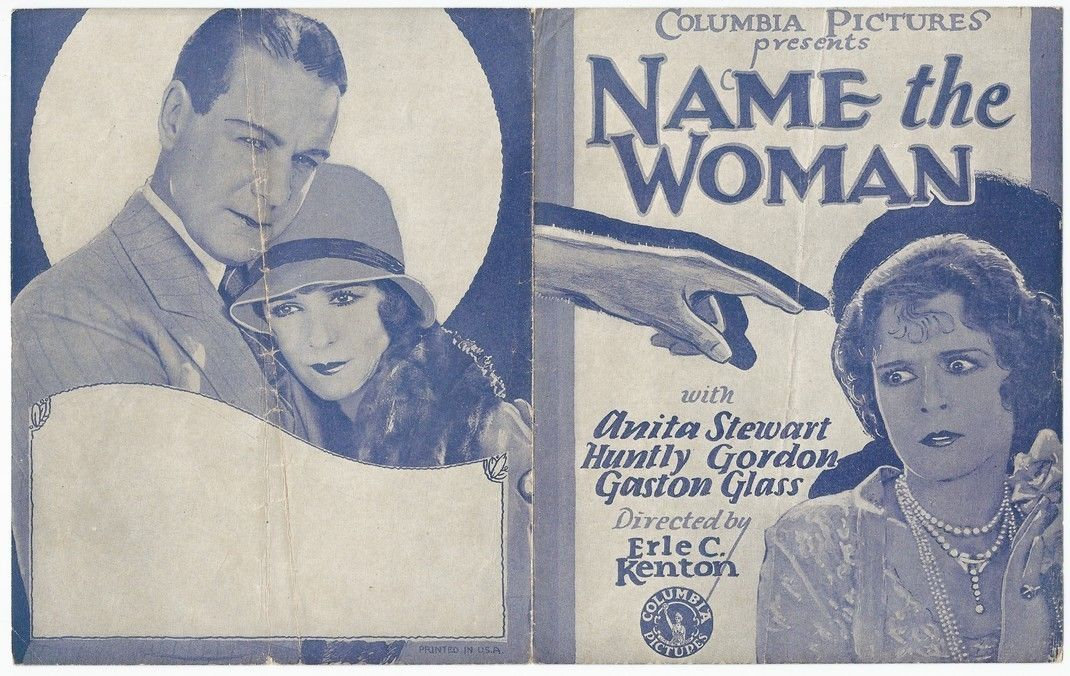
- Directed by: Erle C. Kenton
- Written by: Elmer Harris (novel); Erle C. Kenton; Peter Milne
- Produced by: Harry Cohn
- Starring: Anita Stewart; Huntley Gordon; Gaston Glass
- Cinematography: Ben F. Reynolds
- Edited by: Ben Pivar
- Production company: Columbia Pictures
- Distributed by: Columbia Pictures
- Release date: May 26, 1928
- Running time: 56 minutes
- Country: United States
- Languages: Silent; English intertitles

Name the Woman is a lost 1928 American silent drama film directed by Erle C. Kenton and starring Anita Stewart, Huntley Gordon and Gaston Glass. The film's sets were designed by the art director Joseph C. Wright. The studios's 1934 sound film of the same title is not a remake.

== Synopsis ==
A man on trial for murder is cleared when the wife of the prosecuting attorney reveals that she is his alibi having spent the night of Mardi Gras, when the killing occurred, with him. Realising that his neglect of his wife is to blame, the lawyer resigns from public office.

== Cast ==
- Anita Stewart as Florence
- Huntley Gordon as Marshall
- Gaston Glass as Joe Arnold
- Chappell Dossett as Judge
- Julanne Johnston as Nina Palmer
- Jed Prouty as Sam Palmer

== Bibliography ==
- Munden, Kenneth White. The American Film Institute Catalog of Motion Pictures Produced in the United States, Part 1. University of California Press, 1997.
