= Weary Willie (film) =

- Directed by: George Albert Smith
- Production company: George Albert Smith Films
- Release date: 1898
- Running time: 1 minute 5 seconds
- Country: United Kingdom
- Language: silent

Weary Willie is a one-shot black and white silent comedy short film shot in 1898 which shows a hobo named Weary Willie approach a bench full of upper class people and scares them off one by one.

== Synopsis ==
The film which is 1 minute and 5 seconds long shows a hobo named Weary Willie or Willie for short approaches a bench filled with upper-class people and scares them off one by one until he is the last one on the bench and uses the bench as a place to sleep. This early films is rumored to be what inspired the notorious comedy actor Charlie Chaplin which would go on to make many original classics.
