= Ralph Dewsbury =

British film director

- Born: 1882; Staffordshire, United Kingdom
- Died: 1921 (aged 38–39)
- Occupation: Director
- Years active: 1914-1921 (film)

Ralph Dewsbury (1882–1921) was a British film director of the silent era.

== Selected filmography ==
- The King's Outcast (1915)
- The Man in the Attic (1915)
- Partners at Last (1916)
- His Daughter's Dilemma (1916)
- Everybody's Business (1917)
- The Golden Dawn (1921)

== Bibliography ==
- Low, Rachael. The History of British Film (Volume 3): The History of the British Film 1914 - 1918. Routledge, 2013.
