= Name the Woman (1934 film) =

1934 film directed by Albert S. Rogell

- Directed by: Albert S. Rogell
- Written by: Herbert Asbury; Fred Niblo Jr.
- Produced by: Sid Rogell
- Starring: Richard Cromwell; Arline Judge; Rita La Roy
- Cinematography: John Stumar
- Edited by: John Rawlins
- Production company: Columbia Pictures
- Distributed by: Columbia Pictures
- Release date: July 25, 1934
- Running time: 60 minutes
- Country: United States
- Language: English

Name the Woman is a 1934 American mystery drama film directed by Albert S. Rogell and starring Richard Cromwell, Arline Judge and Rita La Roy. It is not a remake of the studio's 1928 silent film of the same name, although Variety wrongly reported this at the time.

== Plot ==
A novice reporter tries to get his break by investigating the murder of the district attorney.

== Cast ==
- Richard Cromwell as Clem Rogers
- Arline Judge as Betty Adams
- Rita La Roy as Marie Denton
- Charles C. Wilson as Joel Walker
- Thomas E. Jackson as Frank Martin
- Bradley Page as Dave Evans
- Henry Kolker as Judge Adams
- Purnell Pratt as Forbes
- Stanley Fields as Dawson
- Crane Wilbur as Blake
- Eddy Chandler as Chuck
- Wallis Clark as Det. Jeffries
- George Humbert as Louie
- Al Hill as Maxie
- Cyril Thornton as Reynolds
- Beulah Hutton as Telephone Operator
- Joseph P. Mack as Bartender
- Fred Walton as Butler
- Allan Sears as Hobbs

== Bibliography ==
- Bernard F. Dick. Columbia Pictures: Portrait of a Studio. University Press of Kentucky, 2015.
