= Cynthia in the Wilderness =

1916 British film by Harold Weston

- Directed by: Harold Weston
- Written by: Hubert Wales (novel); Harold Weston
- Starring: Eve Balfour; Ben Webster; Milton Rosmer
- Production company: Pioneer Films Agency
- Distributed by: Phoenix Film Agency
- Release date: June 1916
- Country: United Kingdom
- Languages: Silent; English intertitles

Cynthia in the Wilderness is a 1916 British silent drama film directed by Harold Weston and starring Eve Balfour, Ben Webster and Milton Rosmer. It was based on a novel of the same name by Hubert Wales.

== Cast ==
- Eve Balfour as Cynthia Elwes
- Ben Webster as Laurence Cheyne
- Milton Rosmer as Harvey Elwes
- Mary Odette as Erica
- Barbara Hannay

== Bibliography ==
- Low, Rachael. History of the British Film, 1914-1918. Routledge, 2005.
