= Partners at Last =

British silent crime film

- Directed by: Ralph Dewsbury
- Written by: Frank Powell
- Starring: Amy Brandon Thomas; Charles Rock; Chappell Dossett
- Production company: London Film Company
- Distributed by: Jury Films
- Release date: March 1916
- Country: United Kingdom
- Languages: Silent; English intertitles

Partners at Last is a 1916 British silent crime film directed by Ralph Dewsbury and starring Amy Brandon Thomas, Charles Rock and Chappell Dossett.

== Cast ==
- Amy Brandon Thomas as Muriel Wright
- Charles Rock as Edward Bradston
- Chappell Dossett as William Wright
- Hubert Willis as Joseph Trood

== Bibliography ==
- Palmer Scott. British Film Actors' Credits, 1895-1987. McFarland, 1988.
