= Kent, the Fighting Man =

- Directed by: A. E. Coleby
- Release date: 1916
- Country: United Kingdom
- Language: English

Kent, the Fighting Man is a 1916 British silent sports film directed by A. E. Coleby and starring Billy Wells, Hetty Payne and Arthur Rooke. It was based on a novel by George Edgar.

== Cast ==
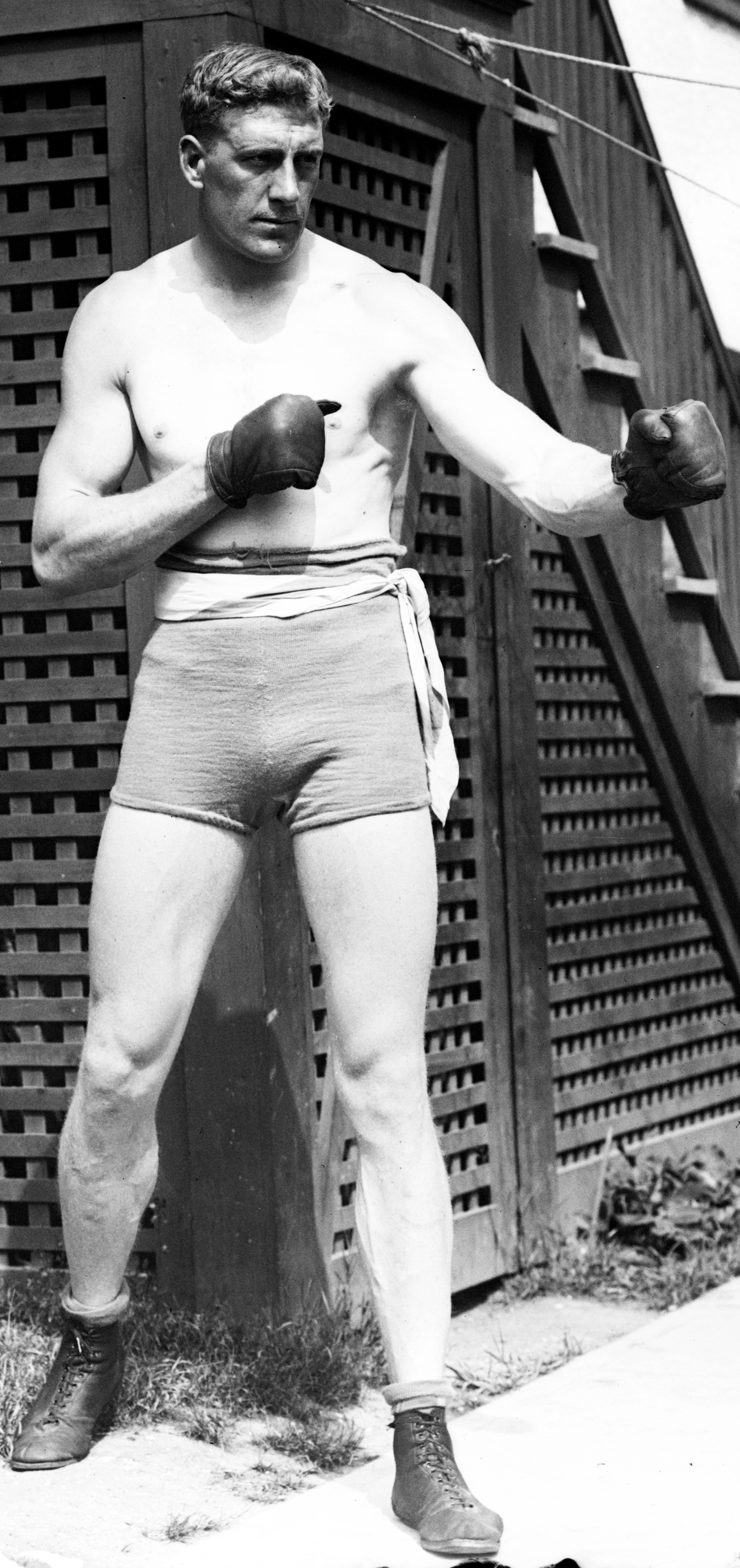
The film starred Bombardier Billy Wells.

- Billy Wells as John Westerley
- Hetty Payne as Constance
- A. E. Coleby as Adams
- Arthur Rooke as Honorable Jimmy Greenback
- Frank Dane as Brother
- Nelson Phillips as Col. Rapton
- Harry Lofting as Jim Dace
- Fred Drummond as Button
- Tom Coventry as Clown
