= For All Eternity (film) =

- Directed by: A.E. Coleby; Arthur Rooke
- Starring: Malvina Longfellow; Janet Alexander; Arthur Rooke
- Release date: 1917
- Country: United Kingdom
- Language: Silent (English intertitles)

For All Eternity is a 1917 British silent crime film directed by A.E. Coleby and Arthur Rooke and starring Janet Alexander, Malvina Longfellow and Arthur Rooke. Its plot concerns a man who is wrongly faced with execution for a murder he did not commit.

== Cast ==
- Malvina Longfellow as Ella Morgan
- Janet Alexander as Nurse Hillyer
- Arthur Rooke as Desmond Leach
- A.E. Coleby as Clifford Morgan
- Richard Buttery
- Joyce Templeton
- N. Watt-Phillips
