= Rex Wilson (director) =

British film director (1873–1951)

Rex Wilson (1873–1951) was a British film director of the silent era.

== Selected filmography ==
- Tom Brown's Schooldays (1916)
- The Life of Lord Kitchener (1917)
- Ora Pro Nobis (1917)
- Quinneys (1919)
- Unmarried (1920), propaganda film
- Tilly of Bloomsbury (1921)
- Housebreaker Charlie (1922)
- St. Elmo (1923)
