= The Woman Who Did (disambiguation) =

The Woman Who Did is a novel by Grant Allen.

The Woman Who Did may also refer to:

- The Woman Who Did (1915 film), a British film directed by Walter West
- The Woman Who Did (1925 film), a German film directed by Benjamin Christensen
