= Daphne Glenne =

English leading actress

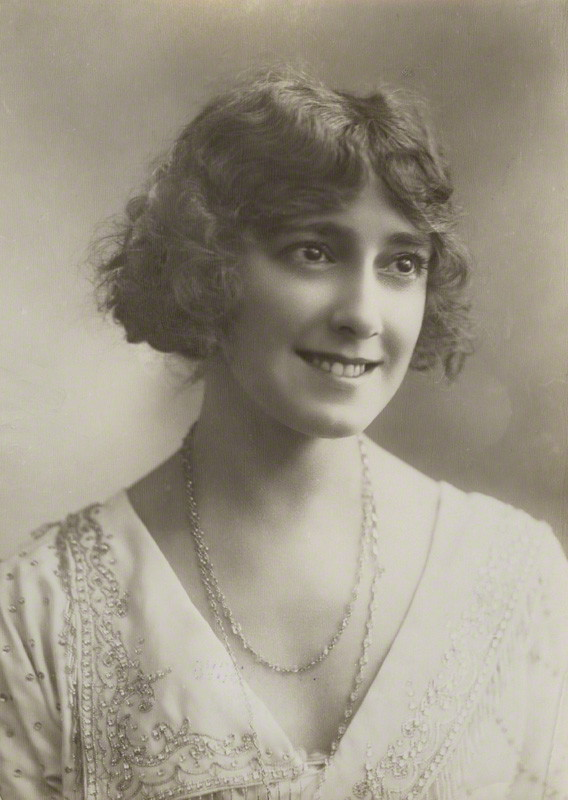
Daphne Glenne, circa 1913

Daphne Glenne (1886–1972), born Dorothy Cornelius, was an English leading actress in musical theatre and silent film in the period around 1910–1920.

== Biography ==
She was born and grew up in Blackheath in south-east London. She adopted the stage name Daphne Glenne in response to her father's disapproval of her seeking a career on the stage, and she continued to use this as her name throughout her life.

She began her theatrical career as a chorister with the D’Oyly Carte Company at the Savoy Theatre in 1906–1907, at one point taking a minor role in the Gilbert and Sullivan opera Iolanthe.

Subsequently, she was engaged by George Edwardes to play in his touring production of Franz Lehár’s The Merry Widow. Initially she played Olga, but quickly took over the title role of Sonia, which she performed around Britain from 1908-1910.

Returning to London, she took over the role of Lady Augusta in the musical play The Dollar Princess at Daly's Theatre. However, she was soon engaged by the American producer Charles Frohman to play the title role in his touring production of The Dollar Princess which travelled around the US in 1910-1911, starting in San Francisco.

Later in 1911, she returned to the United States in the role of Princess Mathilde in Lionel Monckton’s The Quaker Girl, which ran from 1911-1912 in New York at the Park Theatre on Broadway. She continued to play this role in George Edwardes’ touring production in Britain after her return later in 1912.

From 1913 onwards, she played leading roles in a series of successful musical comedies and revues, both in London and on tour, including Bric-a-Brac, Tonight's the Night, and The Dancing Mistress.

In 1917 she was persuaded by the prominent film producer Will Barker to move into silent films. After the success of her first film On Leave, Barker engaged her for another three years to make further films, billing her as “England’s Own Picture Girl”. Between 1918 and 1920 she made five more films (4 of them for Barker) in which she played lead roles, with directors including Alexander Butler and Bert Haldane. No copies of these films appear to have survived.

After 1920 she made no further films, and her career on the stage and in film basically ended. By then Barker had retired and sold his production facilities at Ealing Studios, while her two patrons in musical comedy, George Edwardes and Charles Frohman, had both died in 1915 (Frohman in the sinking of the RMS Lusitania).

In 1928 she re-appeared briefly in the musical play Topsy and Eva in Glasgow with The Duncan Sisters, under the direction of Jack Buchanan, but she is not listed in the opening cast for the London staging that followed.

From the 1930s until the early 1950s she ran a dancing school in Birmingham, putting on revues and pantomimes for charity, especially during the wartime period.

After retiring she lived in South London and died in 1972 at a nursing home in Bexhill.

== Principal musical theatre shows ==
- The Merry Widow (1908-10: on tour))
- The Dollar Princess (1910-11: London & touring US)
- The Quaker Girl (1911-12: New York and on tour)
- The Dancing Mistress (1913: on tour)
- The Merry-Go-Round (1914: London)
- Tonight's the Night (1915-16: on tour)
- Bric-a-Brac (1916-17: on tour)
- Carminetta (1917-18: on tour)

== Silent films ==
- On Leave (1918)
- The Ticket-of-Leave Man (1918)
- The Life of a London Actress (1919)
- Her Lonely Soldier (1919)
- The Lamp of Destiny (1919)
- The Ever Open Door (1920)
