= The Ticket-of-Leave Man (1918 film) =

- Directed by: Bert Haldane
- Written by: Tom Taylor (play)
- Starring: Daphne Glenne; George Foley; Aubrey Fitzmaurice
- Production company: Barker Motion Photography
- Distributed by: Barker Films
- Release date: August 1918
- Country: United Kingdom
- Languages: Silent; English intertitles

The Ticket-of-Leave Man is a 1918 British silent crime film directed by Bert Haldane and starring Daphne Glenne, George Foley and Aubrey Fitzmaurice. It is an adaptation of the 1863 melodrama The Ticket-of-Leave Man by Tom Taylor.

== Cast ==
- Daphne Glenne as May Edwards
- George Foley as Bob Brierley
- Aubrey Fitzmaurice as Hawkshaw
- Wilfred Benson as James Tiger Dalton
- Rolf Leslie as Melter Moss
- Rachel de Solla as Mrs. Willoughby
- George Harrington as Eliza

== Bibliography ==
- Goble, Alan. The Complete Index to Literary Sources in Film. Walter de Gruyter, 1999.
