= Jane Shore (1915 film) =

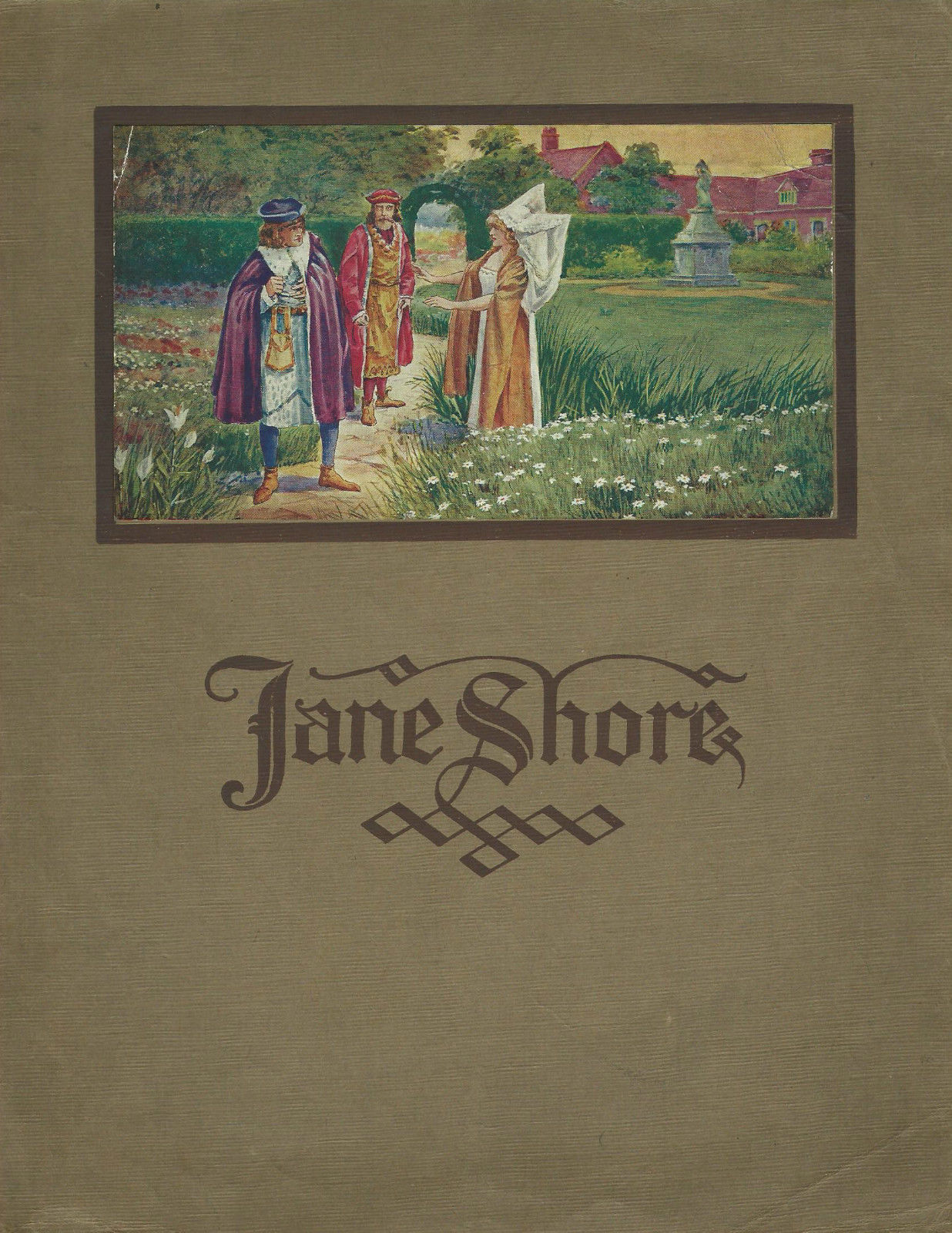
- Jane Shore publicity cover 1915
- Directed by: Bert Haldane; F. Martin Thornton
- Written by: Nicholas Rowe (play); W.G. Wills (play); Rowland Talbot
- Produced by: Will Barker
- Starring: Blanche Forsythe; Roy Travers; Robert Purdie; Thomas H. MacDonald
- Cinematography: Will Barker
- Production company: Barker Motion Photography
- Distributed by: Walturdaw (UK); Mutual Film (US)
- Release date: 1915
- Running time: 79 minute
- Country: United Kingdom
- Language: English

Jane Shore is a 1915 British silent historical film directed by Bert Haldane and F. Martin Thornton and starring Blanche Forsythe, Roy Travers and Robert Purdie. It is an adaptation of the 1714 play The Tragedy of Jane Shore by Nicholas Rowe and is based on the life of Jane Shore, the mistress of Edward IV.

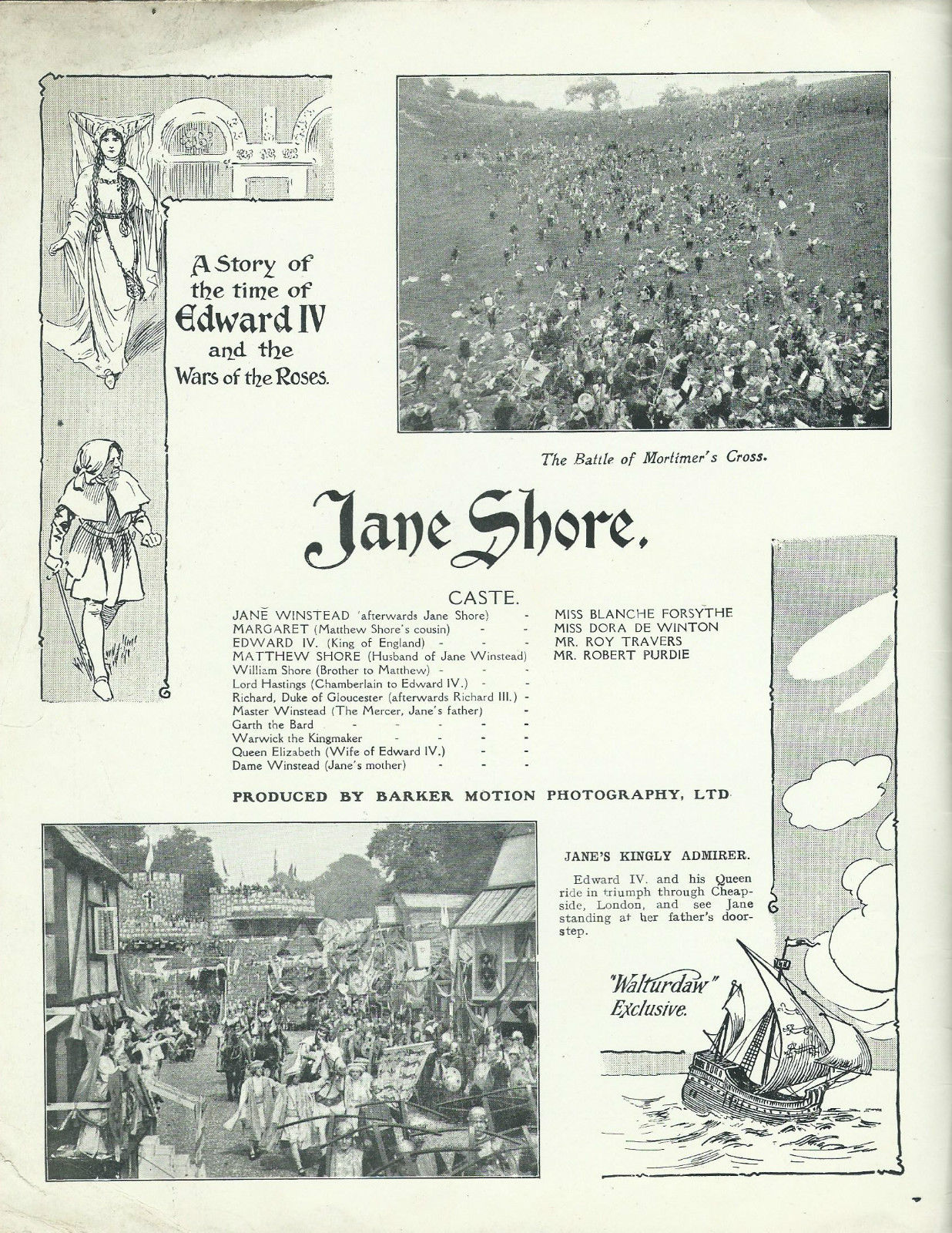

== Cast ==
- Blanche Forsythe as Jane Winstead
- Roy Travers as Edward IV
- Robert Purdie as Matthew Shore
- Thomas H. MacDonald as Lord Hastings
- Dora De Winton as Margaret
- Maud Yates as Queen Elizabeth
- Nelson Phillips as William Shore
- Rolf Leslie as Duke of Gloucester
- Tom Coventry as Master Winstead
- Rachel de Solla as Dame Winstead
- Frank Melrose as Garth the Bard
- Fred Pitt as Warwick
