= Jack Tar (film) =

- Directed by: Bert Haldane
- Written by: Ben Landeck (play); Arthur Shirley (play); Rowland Talbot
- Starring: Jack Tessier; Eve Balfour; Thomas H. MacDonald
- Production company: Barker Motion Photography
- Distributed by: I.C.C.
- Release date: April 1915
- Country: United Kingdom
- Languages: Silent; English intertitles

Jack Tar is a 1915 British silent war film directed by Bert Haldane and starring Jack Tessier, Eve Balfour and Thomas H. MacDonald. An Admiral's daughter goes undercover in Turkey to help a British agent thwart a German plot during the First World War.

== Cast ==
- Jack Tessier as Lt. Jack Atherley
- Eve Balfour as Margherita
- Thomas H. MacDonald as Max Schultz
- Harry Royston as Dick Starling
- J. Hastings Batson as Sir Michael Westwood
- Blanche Forsythe as Maid

== Bibliography ==
- Goble, Alan. The Complete Index to Literary Sources in Film. Walter de Gruyter, 1999.
