= Scars of Love =

Scars of Love may refer to:

- Scars of Love (film), a 1918 Australian silent film
- Scars of Love (album), a 1987 album by TKA
  - Scars of Love (song)
