= Rowland Talbot =

British screenwriter

Rowland Talbot was a British screenwriter of the silent era.

== Selected filmography ==
- The Lure of London (1914)
- Jane Shore (1915)
- Tommy Atkins (1915)
- Jack Tar (1915)
- Five Nights (1915)
- The Lure of Drink (1915)
- Brigadier Gerard (1915)
- The Rogues of London (1915)
- Beneath the Mask (1915)
- The Picture of Dorian Gray (1916)
- Kent, the Fighting Man (1916)
- Ora Pro Nobis (1917)
- Thelma (1918)
- The Secret Woman (1918)
