= Trapped by the London Sharks =

- Directed by: L.C. MacBean
- Starring: Humberston Wright; Blanche Forsythe; Bertram Burleigh
- Production company: Barker Films
- Distributed by: Magnet Film Exchange
- Release date: June 1916
- Running time: 4,500 feet
- Country: United Kingdom
- Languages: Silent; English intertitles

Trapped by the London Sharks is a 1916 British silent drama film directed by L.C. MacBean and starring Humberston Wright, Blanche Forsythe and Bertram Burleigh.

== Cast ==
- Humberston Wright as John Manton
- Blanche Forsythe as Hilda Manton
- Bertram Burleigh as Inspector James Graham
- Maud Yates as Countess Zena
- Hugh Nicolson as Baron Slomann

== Bibliography ==
- Palmer, Scott. British Film Actors' Credits, 1895-1987. McFarland, 1998.
