= The Odds Against Her =

1919 film

- Directed by: Alexander Butler
- Produced by: Jack W. Smith
- Starring: Milton Rosmer; Edna Dormeuil; Lorna Della; George Foley
- Production company: Barker Films
- Distributed by: Jury Films
- Release date: November 1919
- Running time: 5 reels
- Country: United Kingdom
- Languages: Silent; English intertitles

The Odds Against Her is a 1919 British silent drama film directed by Alexander Butler and starring Milton Rosmer, Edna Dormeuil and Lorna Della. It was made at Ealing Studios.

== Cast ==
- Milton Rosmer as Leo Strathmore
- Edna Dormeuil as Nanette
- Lorna Della as Lolita Rios
- George Foley as The Baron
- Thomas H. MacDonald
- Nancy Kenyon
- Vernon Davidson
- André Randall

== Bibliography ==
- Bamford, Kenton. Distorted Images: British National Identity and Film in the 1920s. I.B. Tauris, 1999.
- Low, Rachael. History of the British Film, 1918-1929. George Allen & Unwin, 1971.
