= God's Clay =

God's Clay may refer to:

- God's Clay (novel), a 1913 novel by Alice and Claude Askew
- God's Clay (1919 film), a British film directed by Arthur Rooke
- God's Clay (1928 film), a British film directed by Graham Cutts
