= Do Unto Others (disambiguation) =

Do Unto Others is part of the Golden Rule.

Do Unto Others may also refer to:

- Do Unto Others, a 2023 Japanese drama film starring Kenichi Matsuyama and Masami Nagasawa
- Do Unto Others (film), a 1915 British silent drama film
- "Do Unto Others" (song), a single by Luke Vibert
- Do Unto Others, part of the 1995-released EP titled "Mindless Self-Indulgence" by Jimmy Urine and re-released in 2015 under the name of Mindless Self Indulgence, The band that Urine sings in, on the compilation album "Pink".

== See also ==
- Unto Others
