= Lights of London (1914 film) =

- Directed by: Bert Haldane
- Written by: George R. Sims (play); Harry Engholm
- Produced by: William G.B. Barker
- Starring: Arthur Chesney; Phyllis Relph; Fred Paul; Roy Travers
- Production company: Barker Motion Photography
- Distributed by: Magnet Film Exchange
- Release date: April 1914
- Country: United Kingdom
- Language: English

Lights of London is a 1914 British silent drama film directed by Bert Haldane and starring Arthur Chesney, Phyllis Relph and Fred Paul. The film is based on the 1881 stage melodrama The Lights o' London by George Sims and was made at Ealing Studios. The play was again turned into a silent film in 1923.

The film is a thriller and melodrama in which a young man is sent to prison after being framed by his cousin and manages to escape to save his fiancée.

The film was produced by William G.B. Barker.

The film had four reels.

== Cast ==
- Arthur Chesney as Harold Armytage
- Phyllis Relph as Hetty Preene
- Fred Paul as Clifford Armytage
- Thomas H. MacDonald
- J. Hastings Batson
- Roy Travers
- Rolf Leslie

== Bibliography ==
- Low, Rachael. History of the British Film, 1914-1918. Routledge, 2005.
