= She (1916 film) =

- Directed by: Will Barker; Horace Lisle Lucoque
- Written by: Nellie E. Lucoque
- Based on: She; 1887 novel by H. Rider Haggard
- Produced by: Will Barker
- Starring: Alice Delysia; Henry Victor; Sydney Bland
- Production companies: Barker Motion Photography; Lucoque
- Distributed by: Lucoque
- Release date: February 1916
- Country: United Kingdom
- Languages: Silent; English intertitles

She is a 1916 British silent adventure film directed by Will Barker and Horace Lisle Lucoque and starring Alice Delysia, Henry Victor and Sydney Bland. It is an adaptation of H. Rider Haggard's 1887 novel She.

== Cast ==
- Alice Delysia as Ayesha
- Henry Victor as Leo Vincey
- Sydney Bland as Horace Holly
- Blanche Forsythe as Ustane
- Jack Denton as Job
- J. Hastings Batson as Bilali

== Bibliography ==
- Goble, Alan. The Complete Index to Literary Sources in Film. Walter de Gruyter, 1999.
