= The Rogues of London =

1915 film directed by Bert Haldane

- Directed by: Bert Haldane
- Written by: Rowland Talbot
- Starring: Blanche Forsythe; Fred Paul; Maud Yates
- Production company: Barker Motion Photography
- Distributed by: Ashley Films
- Release date: April 1915
- Country: United Kingdom
- Languages: Silent; English intertitles

The Rogues of London is a 1915 British silent thriller film directed by Bert Haldane and starring Blanche Forsythe, Fred Paul and Maud Yates.

== Cast ==
- Blanche Forsythe as Ruth Davies
- Fred Paul as Ralph Munt
- Maud Yates as Vera Verez
- Roy Travers

== Bibliography ==
- Institute, Rachel Low; based upon research of the History Committee of the British Film (2011). The history of the British film. 1914-1918. London: Routledge. ISBN 9780415679886.
