= Brigadier Gerard (film) =

1915 British film by Bert Haldane

- Directed by: Bert Haldane
- Written by: Arthur Conan Doyle (novel); Rowland Talbot
- Produced by: Will Barker
- Starring: Lewis Waller; Madge Titheradge; A.E. George; Blanche Forsythe
- Production company: Barker Motion Photography
- Distributed by: Walturdaw (UK); Universal Film Manufacturing Company (US)
- Release date: September 1915
- Country: United Kingdom
- Language: English

Brigadier Gerard is a 1915 British silent action film directed by Bert Haldane and starring Lewis Waller, Madge Titheradge and A.E. George. It is based on the 1896 short story collectionThe Adventures of Gerard by Arthur Conan Doyle which follows a fictional French cavalry officer during the Napoleonic Wars.

== Cast ==
- Lewis Waller - Brigadier Gerard
- Madge Titheradge - Countess de Rochequelaune
- A.E. George - Napoleon
- Blanche Forsythe - Agnes
- Austin Leigh - General Coulaincourt
- Frank Cochrane - Pierre
- Fernand Mailly - Talleyrand
- R.F. Symons - Major Olivier
- Philip Renouf - Jacques
