= Irene Miller =

British screenwriter

- Born: 1880
- Died: 1964 (aged 83–84)
- Occupation(s): Screenwriter, journalist
- Years active: 1915–1920

Irene Miller (1880–1964) was a British screenwriter active during the silent era. She began her career as a journalist before getting work as a screenwriter, and she eventually became chief of the department at Will Barker's studio; later on, she became a studio publicist.

== Selected filmography ==
- The Children of Gibeon (1920)
- The Night Riders (1920)
- Edge O' Beyond (1919)
- The Lamp of Destiny (1919)
- The Life of a London Actress (1919)
- Her Lonely Soldier (1919)
- Jo the Crossing Sweeper (1918)
- On Leave (1918)
- Meg o' the Woods (1918)
- Mrs. Cassell's Profession (1915)
