= The Lure of Drink =

- Directed by: A. E. Coleby
- Written by: Rowland Talbot
- Starring: Blanche Forsythe; Roy Travers
- Production company: Barker Films
- Distributed by: Sherwood
- Release date: April 1915
- Country: United Kingdom
- Languages: Silent; English intertitles

The Lure of Drink is a 1915 British silent drama film directed by A. E. Coleby and starring Blanche Forsythe and Roy Travers. With a run time of 37 minutes, The Lure of Drink is a temperance movement story that warns of the dangers of alcoholic beverages and female temptresses.

== Cast ==
- Blanche Forsythe as Peggy
- Roy Travers as Ned
- A. E. Coleby

== Bibliography ==
- Low, Rachael. History of the British Film, 1914-1918. Routledge, 2005.
