= Burnt Wings =

Burnt Wings may refer to one of several films:

- Burnt Wings, 1916 silent British film directed by Walter West
- Burnt Wings, 1920 silent American film directed by Christy Cabanne
