= East Lynne (1913 film) =

1913 British film by Bert Haldane

- Directed by: Bert Haldane
- Written by: Ellen Wood (novel); Harry Engholm
- Produced by: William G.B. Barker
- Starring: Blanche Forsythe; Fred Paul; Fred Morgan; Rachel de Solla
- Cinematography: Oscar Bovill
- Production company: Barker Motion Photography
- Distributed by: Walturdaw
- Release date: May 1913
- Country: United Kingdom
- Language: English

East Lynne is a 1913 British silent drama film directed by Bert Haldane and starring Blanche Forsythe, Fred Paul and Fred Morgan. It is based on the 1861 novel East Lynne by Ellen Wood.

== Cast ==
- Blanche Forsythe as Lady Isobel
- Fred Paul as Archibald Carlyle
- Fred Morgan as Captain Levison
- Rachel de Solla as Cornelia Carlyle
- May Morton as Joyce
- Pippin as Little Willie
- Doreen O'Connor as Afy Hallijohn
- Lindsay Fincham as Barbara Hare
- Rolf Leslie
- Roy Travers
