= Five Nights =

- Directed by: Bert Haldane
- Written by: Victoria Cross (novel); Rowland Talbot
- Starring: Eve Balfour; Thomas H. MacDonald; Tom Coventry
- Production company: Barker Motion Photography
- Distributed by: Imperial Films
- Release date: May 1915
- Country: United Kingdom
- Languages: Silent; English intertitles

Five Nights is a 1915 British silent romance film directed by Bert Haldane and starring Eve Balfour, Thomas H. MacDonald and Sybil de Bray. It was based on a novel of the same title by Victoria Cross.

== Cast ==
- Eve Balfour as Viola
- Thomas H. MacDonald as Trevor Lonsdale
- Sybil de Bray as Suzee
- Tom Coventry as Hop Lee

== Bibliography ==
- Low, Rachael. The History of British Film, Volume III: 1914-1918. Routledge, 1997.
