= Tecumseh Opera House =

- U.S. National Register of Historic Places
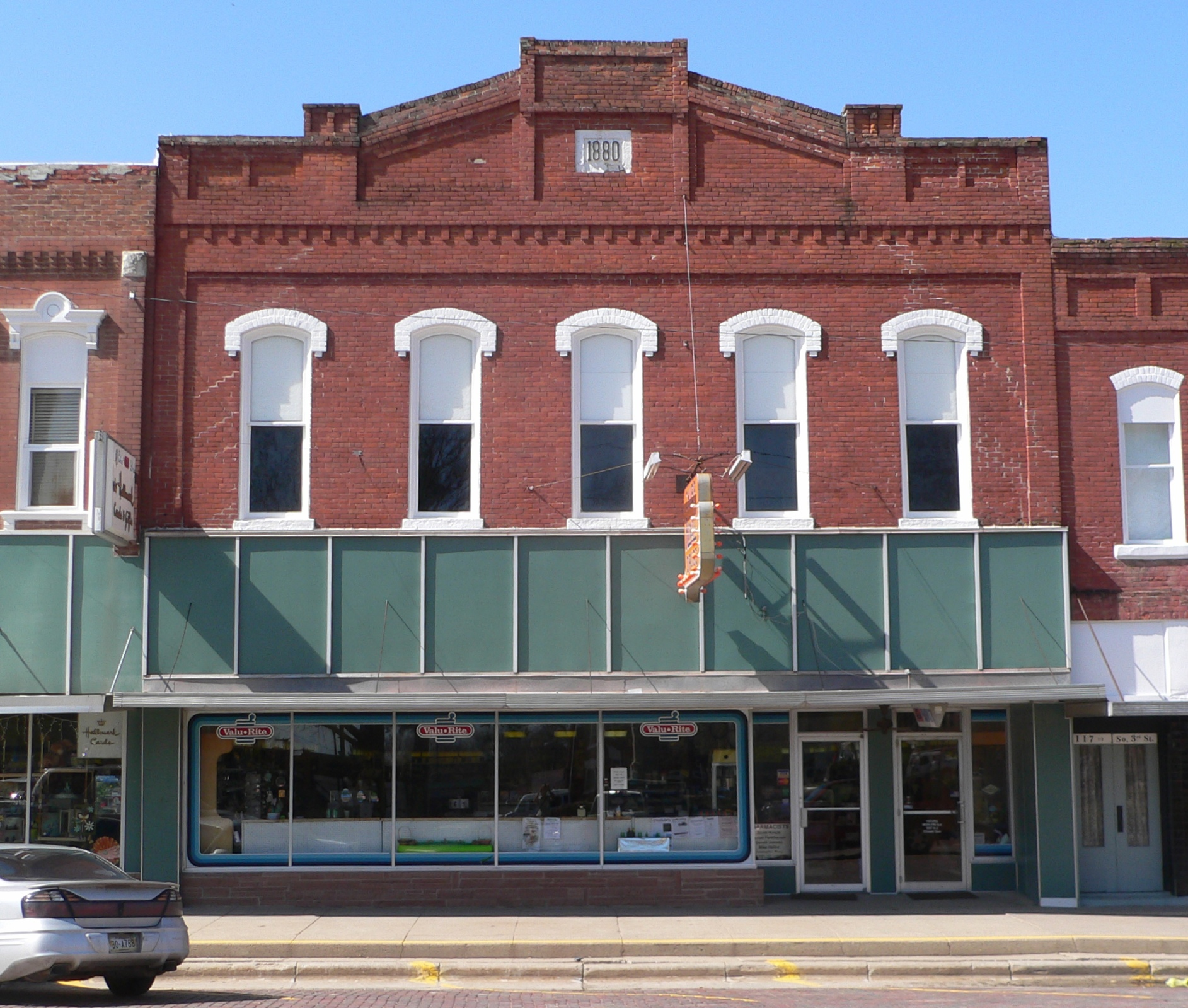

- Location within Nebraska Location within the United States
- Location: 123 S. Third, Tecumseh, Nebraska
- Coordinates: 40°22′4″N 96°11′46″W
- Area: less than one acre
- Built: 1880
- Built by: Dunlap, W.L.
- Architectural style: Two-part commercial block
- MPS: Opera House Buildings in Nebraska 1867-1917 MPS
- NRHP reference No.: 88000929
- Added to NRHP: September 28, 1988

The Tecumseh Opera House, located at 123 S. Third in Tecumseh, Nebraska, is a historic building built in 1880. It is a two-part commercial block building, and has also been known as Seaver Bros. Opera House, as Smith Theatre, as Hahn Opera House, as Spicknall & Goodman Opera House, as Goodman & Canfield Opera House, and as Villars Hall, and it has been denoted NeHBS #J007-53 and OHBIN #ll-29-OI.

It was listed on the National Register of Historic Places in 1988. It was deemed significant as a well-preserved example of an opera house building in Nebraska.

== The building ==
The Tecumseh Opera House is a brick structure measures 76 feet wide by 80 feet wide. The roof is pitched and tar-covered and has sustained significant water damage, but it was repaired. Access to the second-floor auditorium is only by way of a wide staircase, at the top the ticket counter that was there has been removed.

The auditorium of the Tecumseh Opera House stands 30 feet wide by 60 feet, 6 inches long. The theatre does not have a balcony. The original molded white tin ceiling is still there, however it and the surrounding walls have experienced rain damage. The proscenium arch spans 20 feet across and 11 feet high. The stage floor is 18 feet deep from the beginning of the arch at the front of the stage to the back wall. The stage has no apron and contains no trap doors.

The structural and historical integrity of the building has been preserved.

== Significance ==
=== Performing arts ===
The Tecumseh Opera House brought a variety of entertainment to the people of Tecumseh and the surrounding areas. As a center for the performing arts, the Tecumseh Opera House, was home to productions such as musical concerts, touring stock companies, performers such as Maude Atkinson, Katie Putnam, and John Dillon, classics such as Monte Cristo, Uncle Tom's Cabin, and East Lynn, minstrel shows such as the Tecumseh Ticklers, grand and comic opera, dialect comedies, and home talent shows.

=== Performing Arts History ===
Dates	Description
Jan. 1881	Home talent variety show
Nov. 1881	Wallace Sisters in Minnie's Luck Church Choir Co. of Atchison, Kansas, in Capital Jake and Penelope Georgia Minstrels
Oct. 1882	Whiteley's Co.'s The Hidden Hand with Nera Vernon and Dick Oglesby Home Dramatic Society's The Fallen Saved, home talent
Nov. 1882	Among the Breakers, home talent
Dec. 1882	Double Mammoth Uncle Tom's Cabin co.
Oct. 1883	Katie Putnam in Old curiosity Shop
Nov. 1883	James Heywood's Mastodon Minstrels with Heywood's Mastodons, Mocking Bird Minstrels, and Uncle Tom's Cabin Union Square Co. with Uncle Reuben Lowder, French Spy, and Gertrude the Unknown John Dillon in The State's Attorney Smith's Uncle Tom Combination
Oct. 1884	Maude Atkinson troupe
Nov 1884	Double Uncle Tom's Cabin
Oct. 1885	All Fool's Day Peck's Bad Boy Combination
Nov. 1885	A Widow Hunt, home talent by the Tecumseh Comedy Co.
Oct. 1887	McFadden Uncle Tom's Cabin Troupe
Oct. 1888	Noble Dramatic Co. with Uncle Dan'l
Nov. 1888	Gyp Junior, home talent operetta A Cold Day, or the Lap-Landers Pavanilli Troupe Aiden Benedict in Monte Cristo
Dec. 1888	The Louie Lord Co.
Oct. 1889	Colored Warblers Boston Ideal Minstrels
Dec. 1889	Blind Boone Concert Co.
Nov. 1890	Grand Comedy Co.
Dec. 1890	Nevada by home talent, music by Tecumseh Military Band
Oct. 1891	Kemper Komedy Co. with The Black Flag The Tennessee Scout by home talent
Oct. 1892	Little Tycoon Opera Co. of Pawnee City Berger-Dainty Concert Co.
Nov. 1892	Edgewood Folks with Alba Herwood
Oct. 1893	John Dillon in A Model Husband
Nov. 1893	Child's Comedy Co. and Baby Brass Band
Dec. 1893	Lindsay Dramatic Co. with Ingoma and Miralda
Oct. 1894	Dewey Heywood Concert Co. A Cold Day and Chip O' the Old Block
Nov. 1894	Uncle Tom's Cabin Co.
Oct. 1895	A Turkish Bath Madam Fry Concert Co.
Nov. 1895	A.M. Palmer's New York Co. with Trilby
Oct. 1896	Juno Barrett Co. in Reddy, the Mail Girl
Nov. 1896	Bittner Theatre Co. with Friends, Josh Spruceby, and The Lightning Express Josh Dillon in Wanted the Earth
Oct. 1897	The King of the Klondyke Senter-Payton Comedy co. Walter McDonald in Gilhooley's Reception The Missouri Girl Carlton & Lord Comedians in The American Princess with Jennie Calef
Nov. 1897	Beach & Bowers' Minstrels F. E. Spooner's Dramatic Co. with The Flower Girl The Nashville Students
Oct. 1898	The Merrie Bells Opera Co. with Olivette starring Ada Palmer Walker and Ed Seamans as Fra Diavola
Nov. 1898	The Shakers Medicine Show Uncle Hiram by the Tecumseh Dramatic Co.
Oct. 1899	A Turkish Bath Labadie's Co.'s Faust Richards and Pringles famous Georgia Minstrels Maloney's Wedding
Oct. 1900	Curts Dramatic Co. Schubert Symphony Club concert, including the Shubert Lady Quartet
Nov. 1900	Fitz & Webster's My Daughter's Husband with Dan Sherman Hans Hansen
Oct. 1901	Golden Rule Company
Nov. 1901	In Old Kentucky by the Tecumseh Dramatic Club Hogan's Alley Lillian Sterling's Burlesquers Courtney Morgan in East Lynne
Dec. 1901	Lincoln J Carter's The Eleventh Hour with Carles Gardner Madam Elsie de Tourney in Mary, Queen of Scots and Romeo and Juliet
Oct. 1902	Holden Brothers' The Denver Express A Breezy Time
Nov. 1902	E. J. Carpenter's For Her Sake Tecumseh Choral Union concert Brown's in Town Guy Green's Indians
Dec. 1902	Down Mobile by Lincoln J. Carter
Oct. 1903	Fulton Bros. Stock Co. in A Married Bachelor and Under Two Flags Earle Doty & Co. in The Iron Mask Don Wescott Novelty Entertainment Co. Where is Cobb? Gilbert Faust's The Two Orphans
Nov. 1903	Dixon Stock Co. in Don Caesar de Barzan with Leland Webb A Thoroughbred Tramp
Oct. 1904	E. J. Carpenter's A Little Outcast Joseph DeGrasse & Co.'s Hamlet Byron Troubadours of Chicago King- Perkins co.'s Old Farmer Hopkins with Frank G. King and Chic Perkins The Girl From Kansas
Nov. 1904	Kerhoff Stock Co. in A Southern Rose, Down on the Farm, Sappho, and A Family Affair. Was She to Blame?
Oct. 1905	Manning Glee Club of Boston E. J. Carpenter's A Little Outcast Wood & Ward's The Two Married Tramps
Nov. 1905	A Royal Slave with Eunice Murdock Stetson's Uncle Tom's Cabin co.
Oct. 1906	Prof. O. B. Griffith of the Griffith Comedy Co. The Country Kids Roland & Clifford's Over Niagara Falls
Nov. 1906	Walker Whiteside's We Are King with Lawrence Evart
Oct. 1907	Oakes & Wilson's A Bachelor's Honeymoon with Herbert DeGuerre and Grace Johnson When We Were Friends J. C. Lewis in The New Si Plunkard
Nov. 1907	Old Times entertainment by home talent The Slow Poke with W.B. Patton Chimes of Norway by the Beggar Prince Comic Opera Co. Wood & Ward's Two Merry Tramps
Dec. 1907	The Oriole Concert Co.
Oct. 1908	Sumner-Davis Concert Co. My Dixie Girl MacCauley & Patton's When We Were Friends
Nov. 1908	Wood & Ward's Two Merry Tramps and The Indiana Indians The Cow-Puncher by Hal Reid Three Years in Arkansaw Lucas Garrett Co.
Oct. 1909	Robert Sherman's My Friend from Arkansaw The Man On the Box The Belle of Japan Alterbery & Guys' The Missouri Outlaw Strollers Male Quartet & Concert Co.
Nov. 1909	Jack Mahara's White Minstrels Burton Nixon's Lena Rivers The Blockhead with W. B. Patton Doc Allman's Old Dan Tucker
Oct. 1910	St. Elmo Chicago Boys' Choir with Sarah Wathena Brown, Harpist The Prize Winners with the Lyman Twins and Patti Rosa Just a Woman's Way
Nov. 1910	The House of A Thousand Candles, original New York company The Girl from U.S.A. Edward P Reno, magician Violet Griffith Stock Co. in The Cowboy and the Lieutenant Henry Eames, pianist Brown's Tennessee Minstrels
Oct. 1911	Gaskill & MacVitty's The Rosary with Robert Harlan As Told in the Hills
Nov. 1911	The Wizard of Wizeland The Pumpkin Husker James T. McApin's Hans Hanson The Tecumseh Ticklers by home talent Election Night Concert by M. Beyrl Buckley, Miss Minnie Koester, and the Tecumseh Military Band
Oct. 1912	The Wolf
Nov. 1912	The City with Hugo B. Koch The Girl and the Gawk Tecumseh Ticklers, home talent minstrel show
Oct. 1913	The Confession Hillman's Ideal Stock Co. with Ida Root-Gordon and Harry Sohns in The Thoroughbred, The Telephone Girl, and The Defaulter The Girls of Eagle Ranch Old Theobaldi violin concert
Nov. 1913	Tecumseh Ticklers, home talent minstrel show The Spendthrift Shepherd of the Hills Lazy Bill with W. B. Patton
Dec. 1913	Henri Bernstein's The Thief with Miss Janet Allyn Guy Caufman in A Fool and His Money
Jan. 1914	James & Crane, Inc., with The Virginian
Feb. 1914	Sarah Padden in Lavender and Old Lace
Aug. 1914	The Commercial Traveler
Sep. 1914	The Last Settlement with Hal Worth Moore- Eddings Stock Co. with Her Legal Prisoner, The Two Sisters, The Whirlpool, Why Lindy Ran Away, St. Elmo, and Married Life.
Oct. 1914	Hastings Stock Co. with Rosalind at Redgate, The Divorce Question, and The Final Settlement Snow White and the Seven Dwarfs, home talent The Stranger The Girl and The Tramp
Nov. 1914	The Time, The Place, and The Girl The Call of the Cumberlands with Hugh B. Koch The Under Dog Terry's Uncle Tom's Cabin Tempest and Sunshine Tecumseh Ticklers, home talent minstrels.
Dec. 1914	Wolford Stock Co., In the Shadow of the Cross
Oct. 1915	The Prince of Tonight
Nov. 1915	Mutual Stock Co. Tecumseh Ticklers, home talent minstrels Wood & Ward in Two Merry Tramps
Sep 1916	The Girl from the U.S.A.
Oct. 1916	The Other Man's Wife with Ann Hamilton
Nov. 1916	In Old Kentucky Tecumseh Ticklers, home talent minstrels
Dec. 1916	Little Peggy O'Moore
Oct. 1917	Davenny Festival Quintet A Night in Honolulu with The Imperial Hawaiians A Good For Nothing Husband
Nov. 1917	Hillman Ideal Stock Co. The Girl Without a Chance
Dec. 1917	The End of a Perfect Day with Miss Rose Dean

=== Entertainment/recreation ===
The Tecumseh Opera House served as a place where the whole community of Tecumseh and the surrounding areas would be able to gather to attend dances, lectures, temperance meetings, and silent movies.

==== Entertainment/recreation history ====
Dates	Description
Oct. 1881	Episcopal Society entertainment Mrs. Ingham's dance
Oct. 1882	Lecture by Mrs. Elizabeth L. Saxon Tank Kee lecture
Nov. 1883	Silver Cornet Band ball Grand masquerade ball
Dec. 1883	Home talent instrumental and vocal music Temperance lecture by Mrs. Fixen
November 1885	Eli Perkin, "The Champ Liar of the World" Annual masquerade ball Lecture by Dr. Zielle and son, "Stage and Pulpit"
Nov. 1887	Annual masquerade ball Prof. Jundano, ventriloquist and legerdemainist
Dec. Lecture by Prof. Vaught on "Better Marriages" Benefit ball for Tecumseh Band
Nov. 1889	Grand masquerade ball Lecture by Mary A. Livermore of Boston on "Women of the War"
Oct. 1890	Temperance lecture by Luther Benson
Nov. 1892	Ball sponsored by Peerless Dancing Club, music by Professor Luft's Orchestra
Oct. 1893	Lectures by Father Enright on "Temperance" and "The True Church"
Nov. 1893	Lucia B. Griffin, elocutionist and impersonator Ball sponsored by Tecumseh Dancing CLub "Hard Times" Ball
Nov. 1898	Lectures by the Shaker Doctor on "Health" and "How to Live," then grand entertainment using Thomas Edison's Kinetoscope
Nov. 1899	Kline's Lumiere Cinematograph moving pictures Prof. Harry Olsen's students' musical recital
Oct. 1900	Dance, music by three Italians
Oct. 1903	Tecumseh Fire Dept. ball Lecture by Col. George W. Bain on "Among the Masses"
Oct. 1904	Lecture by Dr. M. Stewart on "Naples and Rome"
Nov. 1904	Lecture by Prof. Frank R. Robertson on "Russia-Japan: The Destiny of the Far East"
Dec. 1904	Elias Day, characterist
Oct. 1905	Fire Dept. ball, music by Tecumseh Orchestra
Oct. 1906	Fire Dept. ball
Nov. 1907	Moving Pictures
Nov. 1911	Fire Dept. ball Lecture by Col. P. E. Holp, "California"
Feb. 1914	Promenade concert and grand ball by Tecumseh Military Band Public dance by Tecumseh Military Band
Nov. 1914	Lyman H. Howe's Travel Festival, moving pictures change of management: primary booking now
Dec. 1915	Lyman H. Howe's California Exposition, moving pictures
Nov. 1916	Election night dance Lyman H Howe's Travel Festival, moving picture
Nov. 1917	Grand masque ball Sarah Mildred Willmer, reader

===== Social =====
The Tecumseh Opera House was a nonaffiliated place where people could have political meetings, church socials, basketball, and school entertainment. Before radio and television were invented to tell people about events, they were often scheduled and anticipated months in advance.

====== Social history ======
Dates	Description
Oct. 1882	Political Speech by J. Sterling Morton
Nov. 1883	Chicken Pie festival by ladies of the Universalist Church
Nov. 1885	Pound Party to benefit the Home of the Friendless in Lincoln
Oct. 1888	Political speech by Sen. Charles F. Manderson
Nov. 1900	Chrysanthemum show and supper
Nov. 1903	Bazaar, supper, and entertainment by ladies of St. Andrew's Church
Nov. 1903	Girls' basketball, town team vs. last year's high school team
Nov. 1904	Basketball, Tecumseh vs. State Normal
Oct. 1905	Girls' and boys' basketball, Tecumseh vs. Table Rock
Nov. 1908	Art exhibit and entertainment by high school pupils Basketball, Tecumseh vs. Wilber
Dec. 1908	"County Fair" bazaar by M. E. Church
Oct. 1917	"County Fair" pumpkin show by Tecumseh Bandage Circle
