= Truth and Justice (disambiguation) =

Truth and Justice is an Estonian novel written from 1926 to 1933.

Truth and Justice can refer to:

- Truth and Justice (1916 film)
- Truth and Justice (2019 film)
- Truth and Justice (Afghanistan), an Afghan political party
- Truth and Justice Alliance, a Romanian political party
- Truth & Justice (role-playing game), a tabletop role-playing game
- Truth & Justice (podcast), a podcast focused on people wrongfully convicted of crimes
