= A. E. George =

English stage actor (1869–1920)

A.E. George (22 July 1869 – 10 November 1920) was an English stage actor. He also appeared in three silent films.

He was born Albert Edward George in Castle Hill, Lincoln, Lincolnshire, England and died in London in 1920 at the age of 51.

== Filmography ==
- Henry VIII (1911)
- Brigadier Gerard (1915)
- The Vicar of Wakefield (1916)
