= The Lure of London =

1914 film directed by Bert Haldane

- Directed by: Bert Haldane
- Written by: Arthur Applin (play); Rowland Talbot
- Starring: Ivy Close; Edward Viner; M. Gray Murray
- Production company: Barker Motion Photography
- Release date: February 1914
- Country: United Kingdom
- Languages: Silent; English intertitles

The Lure of London is a 1914 British silent drama film directed by Bert Haldane and starring Ivy Close, Edward Viner and M. Gray Murray. It is based on a play of the same title by Arthur Applin.

It revolves around the lost daughter of a surgeon from London who is adopted by a "cockney drunkard"; she becomes a dancer and has an accident before being operated by her own real father.

The film was "praised for scened enacted among the hustle and bustle of the city."

== Cast ==
- Ivy Close as Daisy Westbury
- Edward Viner as William Anderson
- M. Gray Murray as Charlie Brooks
- William Harbord as Sir John Westbury
- Leal Douglas as Lady Westbury
- Gwenda Wren as Olga Westbury
- Lempriere Pringle as George Stamford
- F.W. Trotti as Brooks - a Coster
- M. Delarue as Mrs. Brooks

== Bibliography ==
- Goble, Alan. The Complete Index to Literary Sources in Film. Walter de Gruyter, 1999.
