= Tommy Atkins (1915 film) =

- Directed by: Bert Haldane
- Written by: Ben Landeck (play); Arthur Shirley (play); Rowland Talbot
- Starring: Blanche Forsythe; Jack Tessier; Roy Travers
- Production company: Barker Motion Photography
- Distributed by: I.C.C.
- Release date: January 1915
- Country: United Kingdom
- Languages: Silent; English intertitles

Tommy Atkins is a 1915 British silent war film directed by Bert Haldane and starring Blanche Forsythe, Jack Tessier and Roy Travers. It is based on an 1895 play of the same title by Ben Landeck and Arthur Shirley.

== Plot ==
A German-born captain kills his wife and frames his fiancée, who loves a curate.

== Cast ==
- Blanche Forsythe as Ruth Raymond
- Jack Tessier as The Curate
- Roy Travers as Captain Richard Maitland
- Maud Yates as Rose Selwyn
- Barbara Rutland

== Bibliography ==
- Goble, Alan. The Complete Index to Literary Sources in Film. Walter de Gruyter, 1999.
