= Lucas Cleeve =

English novelist

Adeline Georgiana Isabel Kingscote (pseudonyms, Lucas Cleeve and Mrs Howard Kingscote; 1862–1908) was an English novelist, the author of over sixty works including The Woman Who Wouldn't in 1895. After her marriage to Colonel Howard Kingscote, most of her novels were published under the name Mrs Howard Kingscote.

== Life ==
Adeline Georgiana Isabel Wolff was born in 1862. She was the only daughter of Henry Drummond Wolff, a diplomat and Conservative MP. Recorded in Who's Who as a traveller and linguist, she compiled a book of Indian folklore, Tales of the Sun, or, Folklore of Southern India, and a work entitled The English Baby in India and How to Rear it. However she was best known as a novelist.

Her most famous novel was a response to Grant Allen's The Woman Who Did. The first edition of Cleeve's The Woman Who Wouldn't (1895) sold well but received hostile reviews. She said of this:

If one young girl is kept from a loveless, mistaken marriage, if one frivolous nature is checked in her career of flirtation by remembrance of Lady Morris, I shall perhaps be forgiven by the public for raising my feeble voice in answer to The Woman Who Did.

One of her sons, Algernon Kingscote, became a notable tennis player.

She died in Château-d'Œx, Switzerland, 1908.
