= Do Unto Others (film) =

1914 British film by Bert Haldane

- Directed by: Bert Haldane
- Written by: H. Grenville-Taylor
- Starring: Thomas H. MacDonald; Peggy Richards; Patrick J. Noonan
- Production company: Barker Motion Photography
- Distributed by: Barker Films
- Release date: July 1914
- Country: United Kingdom
- Languages: Silent; English intertitles

Do Unto Others is a 1914 British silent drama film directed by Bert Haldane and starring Thomas H. MacDonald, Peggy Richards and Patrick J. Noonan.

== Cast ==
- Thomas H. MacDonald as Curley
- Peggy Richards as Renee
- Patrick J. Noonan as Steve
- Pippin Barker as Curley as a Child
- Connie Barnes as Renee as a Child
- Willie Harris as Steve as a Child

== Bibliography ==
- Low, Rachael. The History of British Film, Volume III: 1914-1918. Routledge, 1997.
