= Lily Saxby =

British stage and film actress

Lily Saxby was a British stage and film actress. She was born in Poplar, London and died in Willesden, London at age 59.

Saxby married Israel Myers, a publican, in 1906 in Hackney, the marriage ended in divorce in 1917.

== Selected filmography ==
- Traffic (1915)
- Vice and Virtue (1915)
- The Woman Who Did (1915)
- Burnt Wings (1916)
- The Hard Way (1916)
