= The Lamp of Destiny =

1919 film

- Directed by: Alexander Butler
- Written by: Irene Miller
- Produced by: G. B. Samuelson
- Starring: Judd Green; Florence Nelson
- Production company: G. B. Samuelson Productions
- Release date: May 1919
- Country: United Kingdom
- Languages: Silent; English intertitles

The Lamp of Destiny is a 1919 British silent drama film, directed by Alexander Butler and starring Judd Green, Daphne Glenne and Florence Nelson.

== Cast ==
- Judd Green
- Leal Douglas
- Daphne Glenne
- Florence Nelson
