= The Way of the World (1920 film) =

1920 film

- Directed by: A. E. Coleby
- Written by: A. E. Coleby
- Starring: A. E. Coleby
- Production company: I. B. Davidson
- Distributed by: Granger
- Release date: June 1920
- Country: United Kingdom
- Languages: Silent; English intertitles

The Way of the World is a 1920 British silent drama film directed by A. E. Coleby and starring Coleby, Gordon Coghill and Charles Vane.

== Cast ==
- A. E. Coleby as Seth Langton
- Gordon Coghill as Dick Jefferson
- Charles Vane as Marshall
- Babs Ronald as Angela, as a child
- Cherry Hardy as Angela Barton
- Sargeant Stanley as Bill Swayne
- Olive Bell as Landlady
- Henry Nicholls-Bates as Landlord
- Humberston Wright as Manager

== Bibliography ==
- Palmer, Scott. British Film Actors' Credits, 1895-1987. McFarland, 1998.
