= London Day by Day =

London Day by Day was the first newsreel produced by British filmmaker Will Barker in 1906. The newsreel was a short, Silent film documentary film compilation regularly released in a public presentation place and contained filmed news.
