= Blanche Forsythe =

British actress

Blanche Forsythe was a British actress of the silent era. She was born in Islington in 1872 and died in Middlesex in 1953 - aged 80.

== Selected filmography ==
- Sixty Years a Queen (1913)
- East Lynne (1913)
- Jack Tar (1915)
- Jane Shore (1915)
- The Lure of Drink (1915)
- Tommy Atkins (1915)
- Brigadier Gerard (1915)
- The Rogues of London (1915)
- She (1916)
- Trapped by the London Sharks (1916)
- A Just Deception (1917)
