= Cecil Humphreys =

British actor (1883–1947)

- Born: 21 July 1883; Cheltenham, Gloucestershire, England, UK
- Died: 6 November 1947 (aged 64); New York City, New York; United States
- Other name: Cecil Humphries
- Occupation: Film actor
- Years active: 1916–1948

Cecil Humphreys (1883–1947) was a British film and theatre actor who played in 46 films between 1916 and 1948, mostly in supporting roles as doctors, aristocrats, and generals. Among his best-known roles were Judge Linton, in the 1939 version of Wuthering Heights (1939) with Laurence Olivier, and the mysterious "Holy Man" in The Razor's Edge (1946), the first film adaptation of W. Somerset Maugham's novel. In addition, he was also a notable Broadway actor between the 1920s and 1940s, appearing in 17 plays. Humphreys's grandson is actor Chris Humphreys.

== Filmography ==
Year	Title	Role	Notes
1916	The Lifeguardsman	Valet	
1916	The Pleydell Mystery	John Pleydell	
1917	The Veiled Woman	Gascoigne Devine	
1917	The Sorrows of Satan	Prince Ramirez	
1917	The Profligate	Lord Danvers	
1919	The Romance of Lady Hamilton	Charles Greville	
1919	The Swindler	Nat Verney	
1919	The Elusive Pimpernel	Sir Percey Blakeney	
1920	The Pride of the North	John Hargreaves	
1920	The Hour of Trial	John Graham	
1920	The House on the Marsh	Gervas Rayner	
1920	The Amateur Gentleman	Wilfred Chichester	
1920	The Winding Road	Major Gawthorne	
1920	The Tavern Knight	Joseph Ashburn	
1921	The White Hen	Louis St. Romney	
1921	The Shadow of Evil		
1921	The Four Just Men	Manfred	
1921	Greatheart	Eustace Studley	
1922	The Glorious Adventure	Walter Roderick	
1922	False Evidence	Rupert Deveraux	
1922	Dick Turpin's Ride to York	Lytton Glover	
1924	Her Redemption	Hubert Steele	
1925	Irish Luck	Douglas	
1929	The Broken Melody	Gen. Delange	
1929	The Woman in White	Sir Percival Glyde	
1931	77 Park Lane	Paul	
1931	The Old Man	Lord Arranways	
1933	The Silver Spoon	Lord Perivale	
1933	It's a King	Count Yendoff	
1934	Oh No Doctor!	Dr. Morrow	
1934	Guest of Honour	Mr. Gilwattle	
1934	Dick Turpin	Sir Luke Rookwood	
1934	Unfinished Symphony	Salieri	
1935	Adventure Ltd.	General Baroda	
1935	Koenigsmark	De Marçaise	Uncredited
1936	Fair Exchange	Matthew Randall	
1936	Chick	Sturgis	
1936	Accused	Prosecuting Counsel	
1936	Reasonable Doubt		
1939	Wuthering Heights	Judge Linton	
1946	The Razor's Edge	Holy Man	
1947	Desire Me	Dr. Andre Leclair	
1948	A Woman's Vengeance	General Spence	(final film role)
