= The Hard Way (1916 film) =

- Directed by: Walter West
- Produced by: Walter West
- Starring: Muriel Martin-Harvey; Joseph R. Tozer; Thomas H. MacDonald
- Release date: February 1916 (United Kingdom)
- Country: United Kingdom
- Language: English

The Hard Way is a 1916 British silent crime film directed by Walter West and starring Muriel Martin-Harvey, Joseph Tozer and Thomas H. MacDonald. It was the first film to be shot at Broadwest's newly acquired Walthamstow studios. Its plot concerns an English artist's wife who commits bigamy in Paris.

== Cast ==
- Muriel MartinasHarvey as Lilah Chertsey
- Joseph Tozer as Noel Creighton
- Thomas H. MacDonald as Arnold Graves
- Lily Saxby as Clarice Creighton
- George Bellamy as Lepine
- Owen Francis as Martin Graves
