= The Romance of Lady Hamilton =

- Directed by: Bert Haldane
- Written by: Kenelm Foss
- Starring: Malvina Longfellow; Humberston Wright; Cecil Humphreys
- Production company: Famous Pictures
- Distributed by: Phillips Film Company
- Release date: March 1919
- Running time: 7 reels
- Country: United Kingdom
- Languages: Silent; English intertitles

The Romance of Lady Hamilton is a 1919 British historical drama film directed by Bert Haldane and starring Malvina Longfellow, Humberston Wright and Cecil Humphreys. It follows the love affair between the British Admiral Horatio Nelson, 1st Viscount Nelson and Lady Emma Hamilton during the Napoleonic Wars.

== Cast ==
- Malvina Longfellow as Emma Hamilton
- Humberston Wright as Horatio Nelson
- Cecil Humphreys as Charles Greville
- Jane Powell as Irene Greville
- Teddy Arundell as Prince of Wales
- Barbara Gott as Mrs Kelly
- Frank Dane as King of Naples
- Maud Yates as Queen of Naples
- Will Corrie as Featherstonehaugh
- Irene Tripod as Mrs Budd

== Bibliography ==
- Sue Parrill. Nelson's Navy in Fiction and Film: Depictions of British Sea Power in the Napoleonic Era. McFarland, 2009.
