= The Vicar of Wakefield (1916 film) =

1916 film by Fred Paul

The Vicar of Wakefield is a 1916 British silent drama film directed by Fred Paul and starring Laura Cowie, A.E. George and John Hare. It is based on the 1766 novel The Vicar of Wakefield by Oliver Goldsmith. Prints and/or fragments were found in the Dawson Film Find in 1978.

== Cast ==
- Laura Cowie - Olivia Primrose
- A.E. George - Jenkinson
- John Hare - Dr. Charles Primrose
- Marie Illington - Mrs. Primrose
- Martin Lewis - George Primrose
- Margaret Shelley - Sophia Primrose
- Mabel Twemlow - Miss Skeggs
- Ben Webster - Sir William
- Frank Woolf - Mr. Burchell
