= The Secret Woman (film) =

- Directed by: A. E. Coleby
- Written by: Eden Phillpotts (novel); Rowland Talbot
- Starring: Maud Yates; Janet Alexander; Henry Victor
- Production companies: I. B. Davidson; Tiger
- Distributed by: Gaumont British Distributors
- Release date: June 1918
- Country: United Kingdom
- Languages: Silent; English intertitles

The Secret Woman is a 1918 British silent drama film directed by A.E. Coleby and starring Maud Yates, Janet Alexander and Henry Victor.

== Cast ==
- Maud Yates as Anne Redvers
- Janet Alexander as Salome Westaway
- Henry Victor as Jesse Redvers
- A. E. Coleby as Anthony Redvers
- Olive Noble as Barbara Westaway
- Henry Nicholls-Bates as Michael Redvers
- Humberston Wright as William Arscott
- Olive Bell as Sarah Tapp
- W. S. Manning as Flockmaster Westaway

== Bibliography ==
- Palmer, Scott. British Film Actors' Credits, 1895-1987. McFarland, 1998.
