= A. E. Coleby =

British actor (1876–1930)

- Born: Albert Ernest Coleby; 1876; London, England
- Died: 15 July 1930; London
- Occupation(s): Film director, film actor, screenwriter
- Years active: 1907–1929

Albert Ernest Coleby (1876 – 15 July 1930) was a British film director, actor and screenwriter of the silent era.

== Selected filmography ==
=== Director ===
- The Pirates of 1920 (1911)
- Peg Woffington (1912)
- Mysteries of London (1915)
- The Lure of Drink (1915)
- Kent, the Fighting Man (1916)
- Thelma (1918)
- The Secret Woman (1918)
- The Silver Lining (1919)
- The Call of the Road (1920)
- The Way of the World (1920)
- The Right to Live (1921)
- Long Odds (1922)
- The Peacemaker (1922)
- The Prodigal Son (1923)
- The Mystery of Dr. Fu Manchu (1923)
- The Rest Cure (1923)
- The Great Prince Shan (1924)
- The Flying Fifty-Five (1924)
- The Prehistoric Man (1924)
- The Moon Diamond (1926)
- The Locked Door (1927)
- Over the Sticks (1929)

=== Actor ===
- The Secret Woman (1918)
- The Way of the World (1920)
- The Great Prince Shan (1924)
