= Unto Others =

Unto Others may refer to:

- Unto Others (The Wire), the seventh episode of the fourth season of the HBO series The Wire
- Unto Others (band), an American gothic rock/heavy metal band

== See also ==
- Do Unto Others (disambiguation)
