= Sixty Years a Queen =

1913 film directed by Bert Haldane

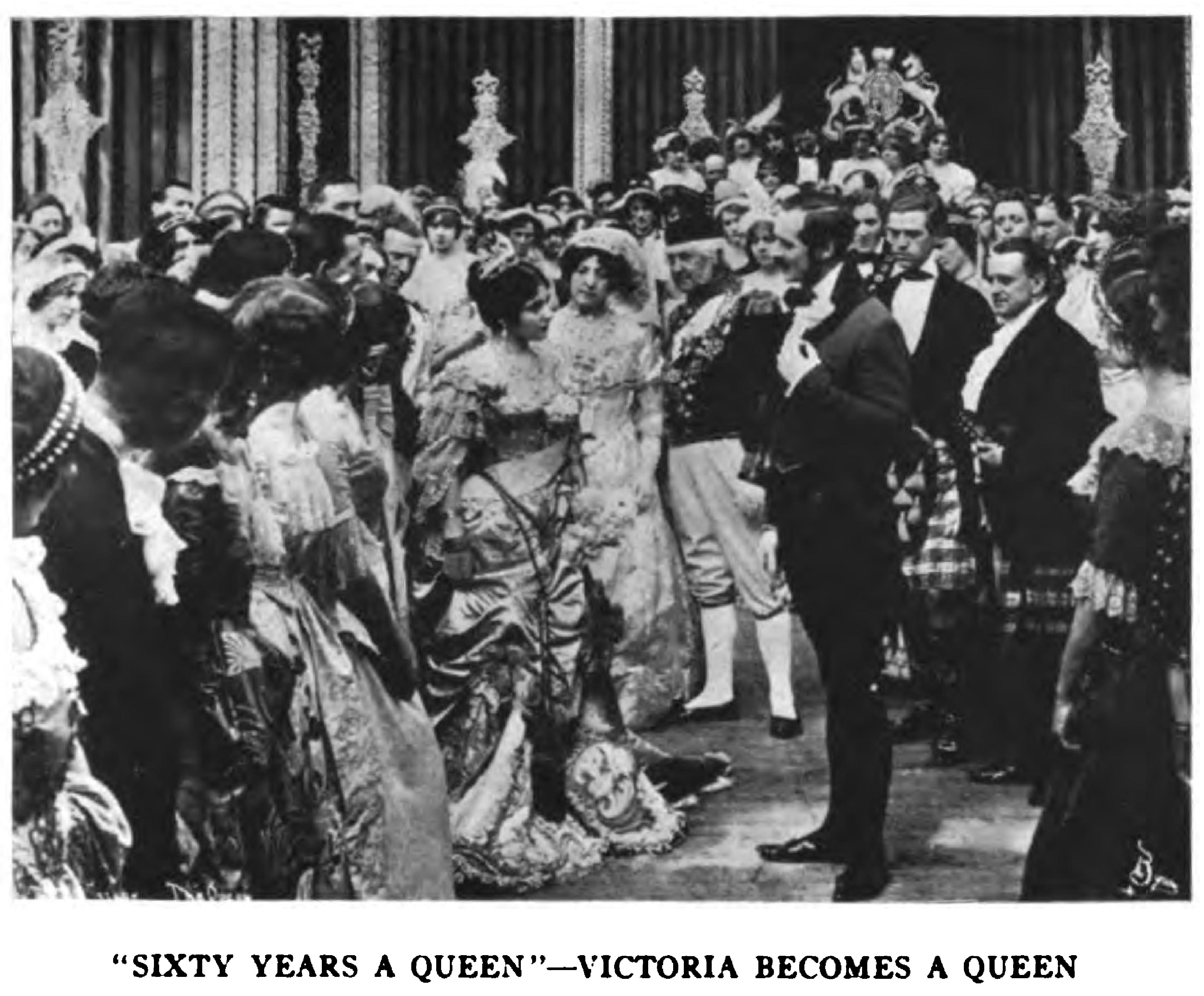
- Sixty Years a Queen
- Directed by: Bert Haldane
- Written by: Herbert Maxwell; Harry Engholm; Arthur Shirley; G.B. Samuelson
- Produced by: G. B. Samuelson; Will Barker
- Starring: Blanche Forsythe; Louie Henri; Fred Paul
- Production company: Barker Motion Photography
- Distributed by: Royal Film Distributors
- Release date: November 1913
- Country: United Kingdom
- Languages: Silent; English intertitles

Sixty Years a Queen is a 1913 British silent historical film directed by Bert Haldane and starring Blanche Forsythe, Louie Henri and Fred Paul.

== Outline ==
The film portrays the six decade-long reign of Queen Victoria, serving as a wider depiction of the Victorian era and its leading British figures. It was based on the 1897 non-fiction work of the same title by Sir Herbert Maxwell, 7th Baronet which had been written to celebrate Victoria's Diamond Jubilee.

== Production ==
The film was conceived in 1912 at a meeting between G. B. Samuelson and his brother Julian Wylie. Samuelson was looking for his first film project, and later brought in Will Barker as his co-producer. The picture was largely filmed at Barker's newly built Ealing Studios, where Barker gained a reputation for extravagant productions, often historical.

A great deal of money was invested in Sixty Years a Queen, and more than a thousand actors and extras were employed, on many locations. There was also much advance publicity. The picture was a great success at the box-offices, making the producers a profit of some £35,000.

More than twenty years later Herbert Wilcox made a similar film, Sixty Glorious Years, which was also very popular.

== Cast ==
- Blanche Forsythe as Queen Victoria (younger)
- Louie Henri as Queen Victoria (older)
- Fred Paul as Archbishop of Canterbury
- Roy Travers as Prince Albert
- Gilbert Esmond as Duke of Wellington
- E. Story Gofton as W.E. Gladstone
- Rolf Leslie as 27 Different Roles
- J. Hastings Batson
- Alfred Bailey Groves as Prince Edward

== Bibliography ==
- Oakley, Charles. Where We Came In: Seventy Years of the British Film Industry. Routledge, 2013.
