= Romany Love =

1931 film directed by Fred Paul

- Directed by: Fred Paul
- Written by: Patrick K. Heale
- Produced by: Patrick K. Heale
- Starring: Esmond Knight; Florence McHugh; Roy Travers
- Production company: Patrick K. Heale Productions
- Distributed by: Metro-Goldwyn-Mayer
- Release date: 1931
- Running time: 58 minutes
- Country: United Kingdom
- Language: English

Romany Love is a 1931 British musical film directed by Fred Paul and starring Esmond Knight, Florence McHugh and Roy Travers. It was made at Isleworth Studios as a quota quickie.

== Cast ==
- Esmond Knight as Davy Summers
- Florence McHugh as Taraline
- Roy Travers as Joe Cayson
- Rita Cave
- Rick Barnes

== Bibliography ==
- Chibnall, Steve. Quota Quickies: The Birth of the British 'B' Film. British Film Institute, 2007.
- Low, Rachael. Filmmaking in 1930s Britain. George Allen & Unwin, 1985.
- Wood, Linda. British Films, 1927-1939. British Film Institute, 1986.
