= Emma Brooke =

English novelist (1844–1926)

Emma Frances Brooke
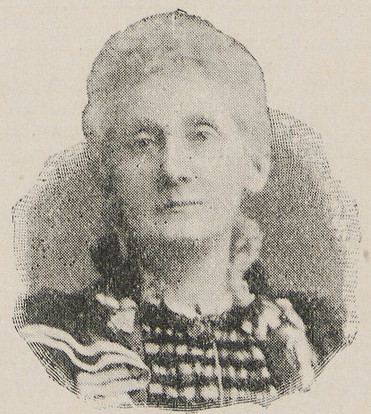
- Emma Brooke as depicted in Program of 1899 International Congress of Women at which she was a representative.
- Born: 22 December 1844; Bollington, Cheshire
- Died: 28 November 1926; Weybridge, Surrey
- Occupation: Writer
- Writing career
- Literary movement: New Woman

Emma Brooke or Emma Frances Brooke (22 December 1844 – 28 November 1926) was a British novelist and a campaigner for the rights of women and workers.

== Life ==
Brooke was born in Cheshire on 22 December 1844. Her father was a cotton mill owner and a capitalist. She was brought up in Bollington. Her father died in 1872 and with her inheritance she invested it in her own education. She was educated at Newnham College between 1872 and 1874 and the London School of Economics in the late 1890s. After she left Newnham she returned to Bollington. She seems to have lost most of her inherited fortune some time before 1879, though it is unclear how this happened. She never married or had children. She supported herself as a writer from 1880 until 1912, when she stopped writing entirely.

Her most famous novel, A Superfluous Woman, was published in 1894. This was called an immoral tale by some male critics of the time. The plot of the novel focused partly on a story about the effects of the degeneration of the aristocratic classes on the women who were forced to marry them for money. At the end of the novel, the heroine, Jessamine Halliday, gives birth to a deformed still born child and afterward dies. Brooke implies, but does not explicitly state, that the Lord who Jessamine marries might have syphilis. This was the first of Brooke's "New Woman" novels. Brooke saw this novel and The Woman Who Did as important in trying to resolve the "Sex Question" which she thought dominated debate in the 1880s and 1890s. She was annoyed when H. G. Wells reinvented the question when he spoke to the Fabian Society in 1906.

Brooke died at a nursing home in Weybridge, Surrey on November 28, 1926.

== Works ==
- Milicent: A Poem (1881)
- A Fair Country Maid (1883)
- God's Gifts to Two or Margaret Redfern's Discipline (1883)
- Reaping the Whirlwind: A Story of Three Lives (1885)
- Entangled (1885)
- The Heir Without a Heritage (1887)
- A Superfluous Woman (1894)
- Transition: A Novel (1895)
- Life the Accuser (1896)
- The Confession of Stephen Whapshare (1898)
- The Engrafted Rose (1899)
- The Twins of Skirlaugh Hall (1903)
- The Poet's Child (1903)
- Susan Wooed and Susan Won (1905)
- Sir Elyot of the Woods (1907)
- The Story of Hauksgarth Farm (1909)
- The House of Robershaye (1912)
