= Maud Yates =

British actress

Maud Yates was a British actress of the silent era.

== Filmography ==
- Tommy Atkins (1915)
- The Rogues of London (1915)
- Jane Shore (1915)
- Trapped by the London Sharks (1916)
- What Every Woman Knows (1917)
- Thelma (1918)
- The Secret Woman (1918)
- The Romance of Lady Hamilton (1919)
- God's Clay (1919)
- The Green Terror (1919)
- Castles in Spain (1920)
- Branded (1920)
- A Bachelor's Baby (1922)
- The Peacemaker (1922)
