= The Winding Road =

1920 British film

- Directed by: Bert Haldane; Frank Wilson
- Starring: Cecil Humphreys; Edith Pearson; Annesley Healy
- Production company: British Famous Films
- Release date: September 1920
- Country: United Kingdom
- Languages: Silent; English intertitles

The Winding Road is a 1920 British silent crime film directed by Bert Haldane and Frank Wilson and starring Cecil Humphreys, Edith Pearson and Annesley Healy. The screenplay concerns an army officer who is cashiered for forgery, but later is granted his freedom after saving a warden from rioting prisoners.

== Cast ==
- Cecil Humphreys as Major Gawthorne
- Edith Pearson as Ruth Gledhill
- Annesley Healy as Jack Gledhill
- Jack Jarman as Lieutenant Chatterton
- Dorothy Cecil as Hon. Mrs. Dunoyne
- Moore Marriott as Jed Sterrett

== Bibliography ==
- Low, Rachael. History of the British Film, 1918-1929. George Allen & Unwin, 1971.
