= The Peacemaker (1922 film) =

1922 film

- Directed by: A. E. Coleby
- Written by: A. E. Coleby
- Production company: Stoll Pictures
- Distributed by: Stoll Pictures
- Release date: March 1922
- Country: United Kingdom
- Languages: Silent; English intertitles

The Peacemaker is a 1922 British silent drama film directed by A. E. Coleby.

== Cast ==
- A. E. Coleby as Big Ben Buckle
- Henry Nicholls-Bates as Ted Staples
- Bob Vallis as Jim Blakeley
- Sam Austin as Fred Smith
- Maud Yates as Miss Brown
- Minna Leslie as Widow Smith
- Frank Wilson as Charles Wilkes
- Humberston Wright as George Brownlow

== Bibliography ==
- Low, Rachael. History of the British Film, 1918-1929. George Allen & Unwin, 1971.
