= Long Odds =

1922 film

Long Odds is a 1922 British sports drama film directed by A.E. Coleby and starring Edith Bishop, Sam Marsh and Garry Marsh.

== Cast ==
- A.E. Coleby: Gus Granville
- Edith Bishop: Sally Walters
- Sam Marsh: Jim Straker
- Fred Paul: Hastings Floyd
- Sam Austin: Tony Walters
- Henry Nicholls-Bates: Sam Marshall
- Frank Wilson: Ned Boulter
- Madge Royce: Mrs. Granville
- Garry Marsh: Pat Malone

== See also ==
- List of films about horses
