= The Laugh on Dad =

- Directed by: A.C. Tindsale
- Written by: A.C. Tinsdale
- Production company: Austral Photoplay Company
- Release dates: 2 March 1918 (premiere); 28 July 1919 (commercial release)
- Running time: 5 reels
- Country: Australia
- Languages: Silent film English intertitles
- Budget: £1,000

The Laugh on Dad is a 1918 comedy Australian silent film. It is considered a lost film.

== Plot ==
John Forrest, aka Dad, is an ostrich farmer. His daughter Jean wants to marry Ralph Bond but Dad is opposed, so he devises a scene where a farmhand will dress as Jean and pretend to marry Ralph. Jean outwits him and the marriage goes ahead.

== Cast ==
- Netta Lawson as Jean Forrest
- Johnson Weir as John Forrest
- May Morton as May
- Mrs Tinsdale as Mrs Dumpling
- Jules Olaff as Arthur Elliott
- Alwyn West as Jim
- Olaf Jensen as Ralph Bond
- Charles Clarke

== Production ==
The film was the first production of the Austral Photoplay Company, run by film importer and entrepreneur A.C. Tinsdale. Finance was raised by means of public subscription, offering two shilling shares to the public; buying one hundred shares got you free motion picture tuition and a part in the film. Most of the cast paid to appear in the movie.

The movie was shot at a real life ostrich farm in South Head.

== Release ==
The film had trouble securing bookings but the same method of raising finance was used to find production of a sequel, Dad Becomes a Grandad (1918).

Tinsdale was later sued by an investor for not paying out his obligations under the film and settled out of court.
