= Austral Photoplay Company =

The Austral Photoplay Company was a short lived Australian production and distribution company. It was established in Melbourne in 1913 by A. C. Tinsdale and later transferred to Sydney in 1917. It initially sought to raise £10,000 to make a film about the goldfields.

It raised funds to make movies via public subscription; people would pay for the right to appear in the film. They later purchased the negatives of films made by the Australian Film Syndicate in 1911–12.

In 1917 Tinsdale shot footage for a feature in Ballarat called Women and Gold which was never completed.

The company was still trying to raise funds in 1919 and also later in 1920, under another name.

== Select Credits ==
- The Life's Romance of Adam Lindsay Gordon (1916) – distribution only
- The Laugh on Dad (1918)
- Dad Becomes a Grandad (1918) – short
- Through Australian Wilds (1918) – documentary with Francis Birtles
- A Romance of Burke and Wills Expedition of 1860 (1918)
- Scars of Love (1918)
