= Eve Balfour (actress) =

New Zealand actress (1890–1955)

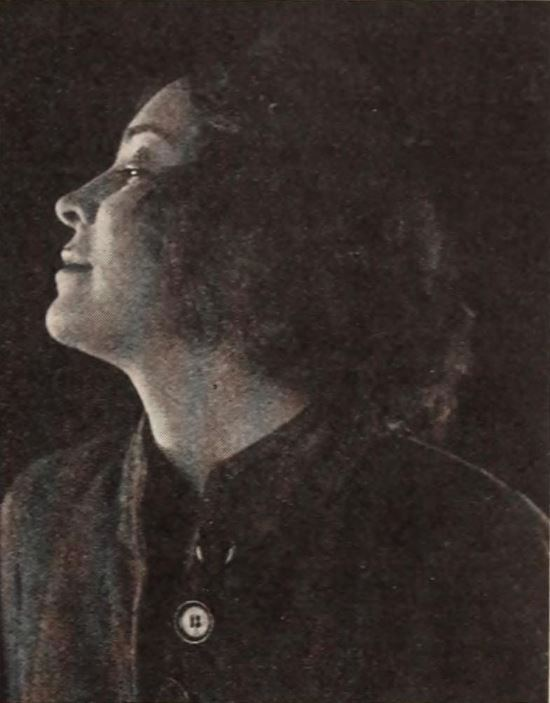
- Balfour in Fantômas (1920)
- Born: 3 May 1890; Christchurch, New Zealand
- Died: 19 March 1955 (aged 64); Northfield, Birmingham, England
- Occupation: Actress
- Years active: 1914–1926

Eve Balfour (3 May 1890 – 19 March 1955) was a New Zealand actress.

Balfour was born in Christchurch, where she attended St Mary's College. She went to London in about 1909 and began her career on the stage there.

== Selected filmography ==
- The Woman Who Did (1915)
- Jack Tar (1915)
- Five Nights (1915)
- Burnt Wings (1916)
- Cynthia in the Wilderness (1916)
- The Woman of the Iron Bracelets (1920)
- The Scarlet Wooing (1920)
- The Black Sheep (1920)
- Fantômas (1920)
