= The Ever Open Door =

1920 film

- Directed by: Fred Goodwins
- Written by: George R. Sims (play); William J. Elliott
- Starring: Hayford Hobbs; Daphne Glenne; Margaret Hope; Ralph Forster
- Production company: Ideal Film Company
- Distributed by: Ideal Film Company
- Release date: 1920
- Country: United Kingdom
- Language: English

The Ever Open Door is a 1920 British silent drama film directed by Fred Goodwins and starring Hayford Hobbs, Daphne Glenne and Margaret Hope. It was based on the play The Ever Open Door by George R. Sims, a leading Victorian writer of stage melodramas. It was one of a number of Sims' plays to be adapted for cinema during the silent era.

== Cast ==
- Hayford Hobbs - Dick
- Daphne Glenne - Miriam
- Margaret Hope - Janet
- Sydney Wood - Robbie
- Terence Cavanagh - Honourable John Halstead
- Ralph Forster - Father Clement

== Bibliography ==
- Low, Rachael. The History of British Film, Volume 4 1918-1929. Routledge, 1997.
- Richards, Jeffrey (ed.). The Unknown 1930s: An Alternative History of the British Cinema, 1929- 1939. I.B. Tauris & Co, 1998.
