= Down Channel =

1929 film

- Directed by: Michael Barringer
- Written by: Michael Barringer
- Produced by: E. Gordon Craig
- Starring: Henry Victor; Alf Goddard; Roy Travers
- Production company: New Era Films
- Distributed by: New Era Films
- Release date: February 1929
- Country: United Kingdom
- Languages: Silent; English intertitles

Down Channel is a 1929 British silent adventure film directed by Michael Barringer and starring Henry Victor, Alf Goddard and Roy Travers. It was made at Cricklewood Studios.

== Cast ==
- Henry Victor as Smiler
- Alf Goddard as Nixon
- Christopher Anthony as The Boy
- Roy Travers as Smuggler

== Bibliography ==
- Low, Rachael. Filmmaking in 1930s Britain. George Allen & Unwin, 1985.
- Wood, Linda. British Films, 1927-1939. British Film Institute, 1986.
