= The Child Stealers =

1904 British film by William Barker

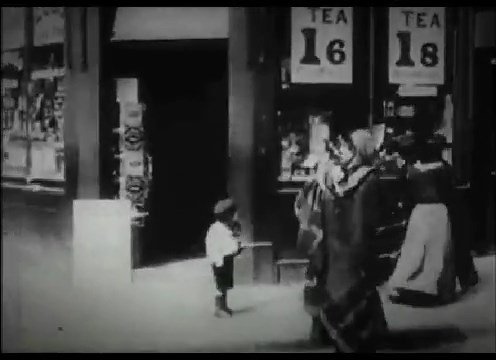
- Screenshot
- Directed by: William Barker
- Starring: Kenneth Barker, Alfred Collins
- Production company: Warwick Trading Company
- Release date: 1904
- Running time: 5 min.
- Country: United Kingdom

The Child Stealers also known as The Kidnapped Child or Child Stealing is a 1904 British silent crime film about kidnapping, directed by William Barker and produced by the Warwick Trading Company.

== Plot ==
As a mother enters a store, she leaves her child outside in a perambulator. Another woman standing nearby quickly snatches the child out of the carriage. Soon afterwards, another mother is playing with two children in the park, and when she leaves one of them unattended, her child is also seized by the same woman. These are only two of a number of children that an unscrupulous couple has captured for their own purposes.

== Production and distribution ==
This is the first film directed by William Barker, who was then working for the Warwick Trading Company. The film has been distributed in the United Kingdom by the same company. It has been distributed in the United States by the Edison Manufacturing Company and by the American Mutoscope and Biograph Company who has registered it for copyright on June 9, 1904.

== Analysis ==
The film is composed of 6 scenes, all of them including only one shot with the exception of the last one which includes two shots showing the continuation of the action from two different angles. Five shots were filmed on location, while the other two were filmed on constructed sets. The five first shots are wide shots filmed with a static camera, but the movements of the actors sometimes lead to full or medium shots. In the last shot, the camera pans to follow the actors running towards it.

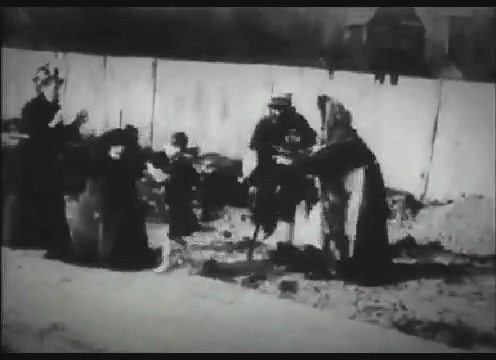

1. A street with a shop front. A lady enters from the right pushing a pram. She leaves the pram in front of the shop and while she is inside another woman, dressed as a gipsy steals the child.
2. A bench in a park. A lady plays with two children. As she leaves the youngest one sitting on the bench unattended, the same woman steals him.
3. A staircase in front of a house with the same woman sitting on the steps. Two women enter with a young boy. As they start arguing, they pay no attention to the boy who is lured away by the same woman.
4. The inside of a slum with a man and several children. The woman enter with the little boy and undresses him.
5. The inside of a second-hand shop. The woman comes to sell the child's clothes.
6. The two gypsies are standing up with the barefooted boy in a street, the woman holding a sign where the word "Blind" is written. Passers-by give them alms until a woman recognises the little boys and the gypsies try to escape.
7. Wider shot of the same street from a different angle. The two criminals are arrested by a policeman assisted by passers-by.

Child stealers has been identified as having made popular in America films about kidnapping, other noticeable example of this new genre being in 1905 Rescued by Rover and in 1908 the first film directed by D.W. Griffith, The Adventures of Dollie. It has also been mentioned as one of the first films where a scene was filmed from two different angles. and as an example of the "preponderance of sordid reality" present in early British drama films.
