= A Bachelor's Baby =

1922 British film by Arthur Rooke

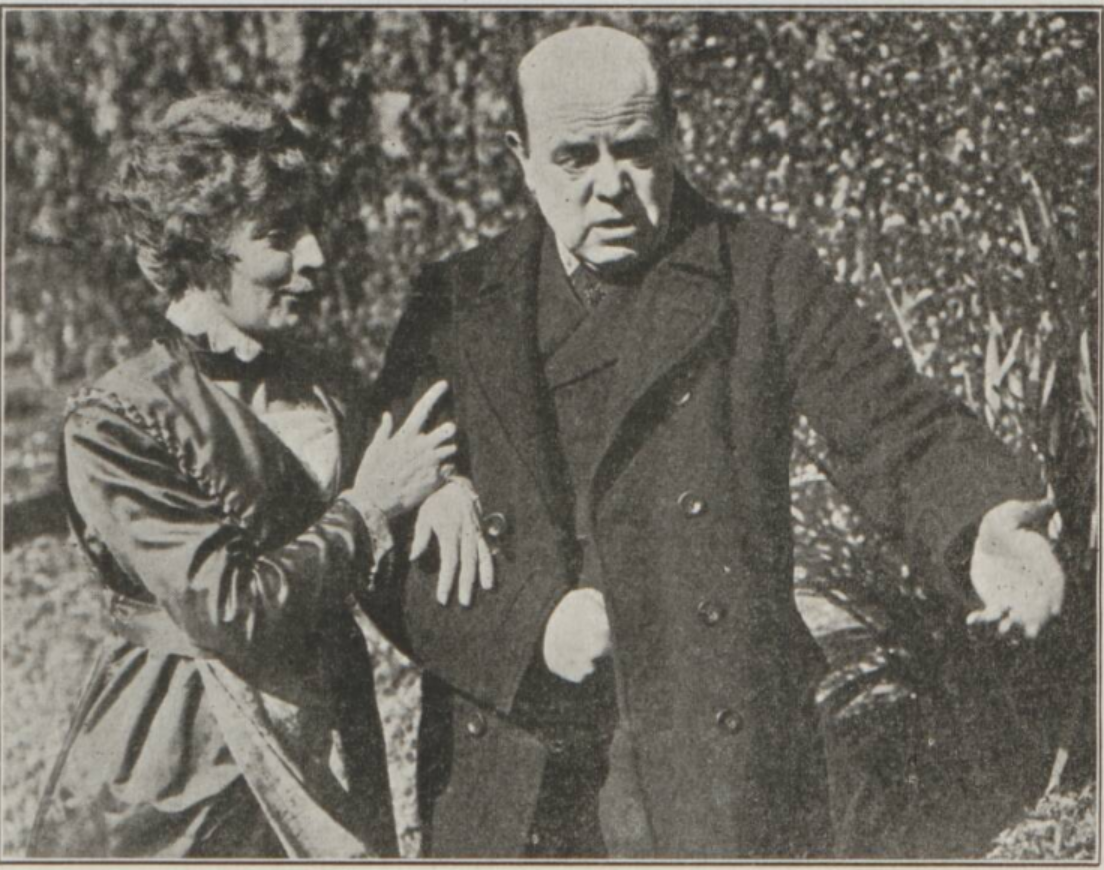
- Tom Reynolds and Haidee Wright
- Directed by: Arthur Rooke
- Written by: Rolph Bennett (novel); Lydia Hayward
- Production company: I.B. Davidson
- Distributed by: Granger Films
- Release date: 27 June 1922
- Running time: 5 reels
- Country: United Kingdom
- Languages: Silent; English intertitles

A Bachelor's Baby is a 1922 British silent comedy film directed by Arthur Rooke and starring Constance Worth, Malcolm Tod and Tom Reynolds.

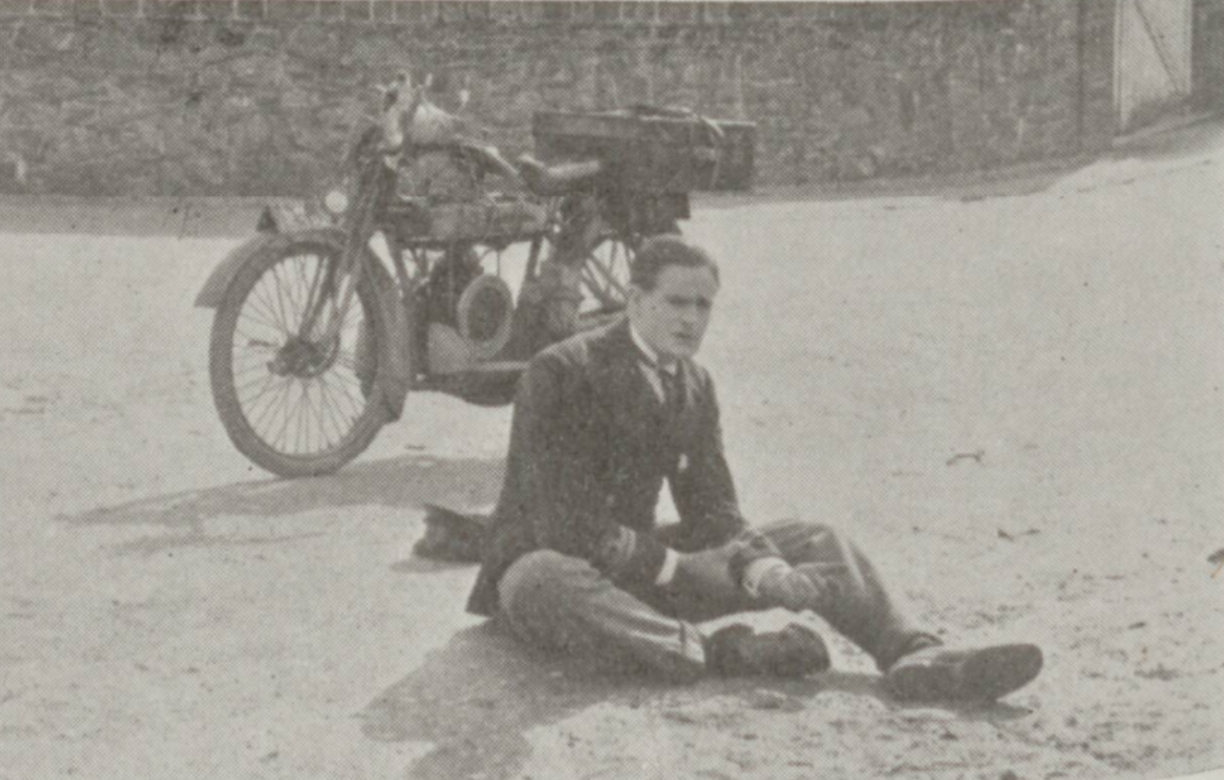
Malcolm Tod in a scene where his character falls off his motorbike

== Plot ==
While on leave, Lieut. James Burton's motorbike breaks down and he spots a supposedly abandoned child. The mother was examining a property and bent down behind a hedge, but James did not see her and took the child to a nearby cottage; where he left the child with the Ponders’ family, who already had nine children.

James' motorbike becomes damaged and he is taken in by Captain Rogers, Miss Fisher, and her niece, Peggy Woodward. Peggy discloses that the captain loves her aunt, and the lieutenant suggests to the captain that he should adopt a baby to win the aunt's heart. James returns to the Ponders household and takes the wrong baby, and complications arise when Mrs. Ponders sees him take her baby. His explanation is not accepted, and the motorists Mr. and Mrs. Nosey Parker, whose property the original mother was examining, quietly remove the child.

James successfully woos Peggy and tries to butter up Miss Fisher for the captain, but he is kicked out of the house. The captain's housekeeper discovers the baby missing and sends for the police, who accuse the captain of murder. The motorists could not find the baby's true mother, and task James to return the baby to the captain, who is relieved at its safety. The trials and tribulations the aunt and the captain have experienced, brought them closer together, fulfilling James' original mission. Meanwhile, James and Peggy have their own happy ending.

== Cast ==
- Constance Worth as Peggy Woodward
- Malcolm Tod as Lieutenant Jimmy Barton
- Tom Reynolds as Captain Rogers
- Haidee Wright as Miss Fisher
- Maud Yates as Mrs. Prowse, the housekeeper

== Bibliography ==
- Low, Rachael. History of the British Film, 1918-1929. George Allen & Unwin, 1971.
