= Thomas H. MacDonald =

British actor

Thomas H. MacDonald was a British stage and film actor.

== Selected filmography ==
- Lights of London (1914)
- The Woman Who Did (1915)
- Jack Tar (1915)
- Five Nights (1915)
- Do Unto Others (1915)
- Jane Shore (1915)
- The Tailor of Bond Street (1916)
- The Hard Way (1916)
- Burnt Wings (1916)
- The Odds Against Her (1919)
