= May Morton =

English actress (1894–1965)

- Born: Marjorie Rose Mohr; December 1894; Hampstead
- Died: 28 October 1965 (aged 70)
- Occupation: Actress
- Years active: 1912–1937

May Morton (December 1894 – 28 October 1965) was an English stage and silent film actress.

== Early life ==
May Morton was born Marjorie Rose Joseph in December 1894, the only daughter of Ernest Joseph and Nena Bessie in Hampstead, London. Little is known about her early childhood but she had a talent for the arts, winning a literature prize for a short story at the age of 10 which was published in The Gentlewoman on 8 July 1905. It was titled “An Imaginary Story”. She also won the Associates’ Prize for her Essay on “A Notable Woman of the Day” on Queen Alexandra, wife of King Edward VII. In November that year she won another Associates’ Prize for her entry in the category “A Day in the Holidays” for her entry “The Shipwreck”. The judges said “Your story is ambitious to a degree, but considering your age, very cleverly arranged and exceedingly well composed. You will do good work some day.” She won a further literature prize in 1907 awarded by the Children’s’ Salon, an organisation composed of “the children of the rich who work for the children of the poor”.

== Acting career ==
By the age of 18, Marjorie had taken the stage name Miss May Morton and was appearing in touring theatre companies, including Albert de Courville’s touring revues. Simultaneously, she was beginning her career in silent film. She played the part of Polly the Girl Scout in a series of films of the same name made by Barkers All British Stock Company and several other films made in 1912 and 1913.

She also appeared in the Sexton Blake film ‘Britain’s Secret Treaty’ in which she played a girl who climbs down Beachy Head on a rope where Sexton Blake is suspended in mid-air and cuts away a fuse which is perilously near burning the rope in half. The film was accused of sensationalism of the most rampant barnstormer type. May Morton told her daughter she performed the stunt herself.

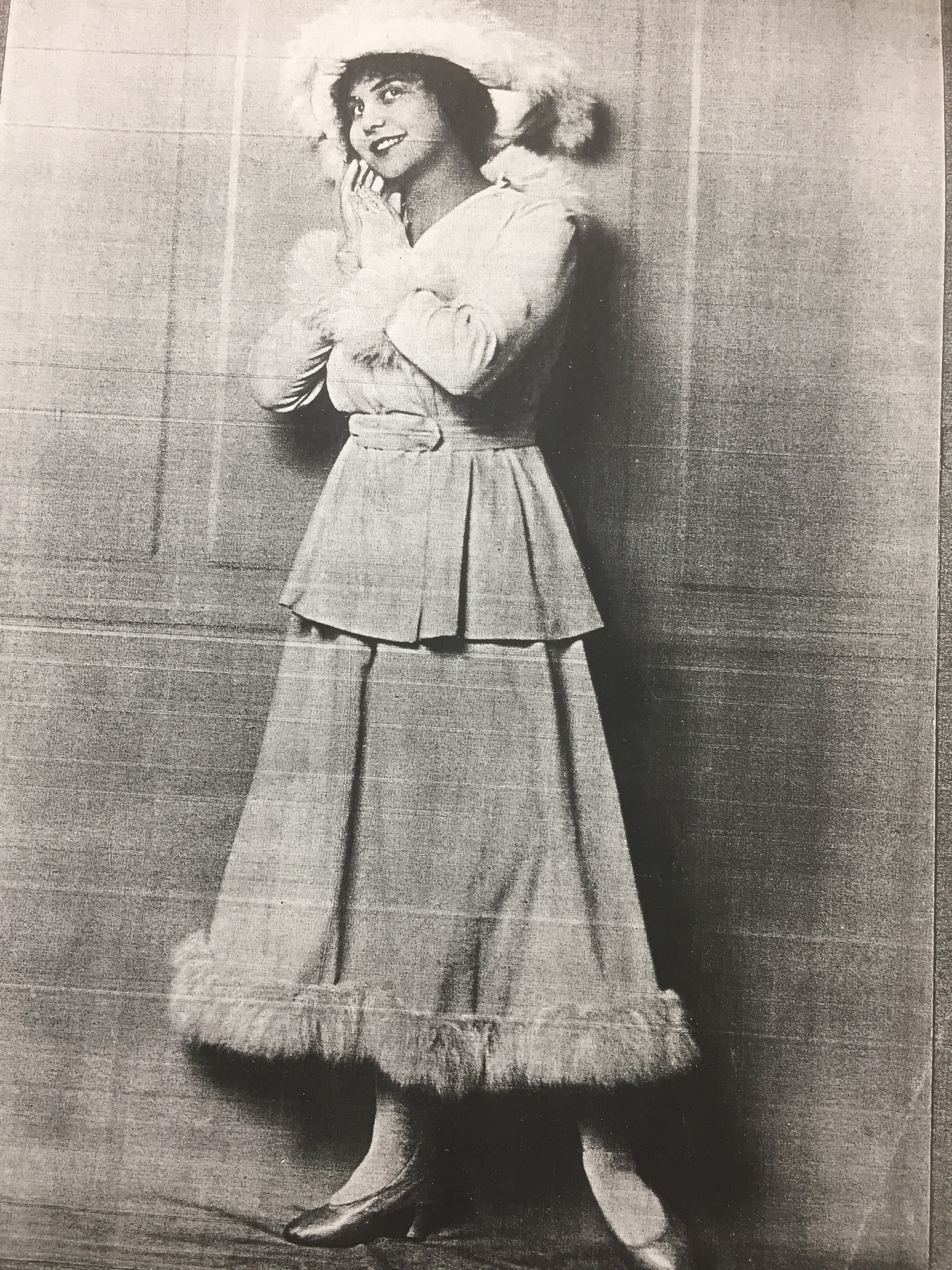
May Morton

Her first published review, dated 18 August 1913, was of her role as Mariette in "The Girl in the Taxi" at the Grand Opera House in Buxton. The play toured over the next few months, playing a week at a time at the Northampton Opera House, The New Theatre, Crewe, The Royalty Theatre, Chester, The Kursaal, Bognor, The Opera House, Coventry, The Theatre Royal Worcester, The Grand Llandudno, the Theatre Royal, South Shields and theatres in Lowestoft, Harrogate, Buxton, Morecambe, Southwold, Margate, Bognor, Weymouth, Worcester, Reading, Aldershot, Chatham, Ipswich, Colchester, Grimsby, York, Coventry, Burton-on-Trent, Lincoln, Grantham and Norwich.

In 1914, "The Girl in the Taxi" went on tour to: Crewe, Chester, Southport, Wigan, Preston, Rochdale, Barnsley, Dewsbury, Birkenhead, Ashton-under-Lyme, Stockport, Walford, Bedford and Woolwich before beginning a six month run at the Lyric Theatre, London. Then there was a Christmas performance of Aladdin at Dalston Theatre. She also played the part of Mimi in “Mam’selle Tralala”, opening in the Lyric, London on 9 April 1914.

At the end of January 1915, May Morton went straight into rehearsals for the role of Mascha in the comic opera, "The Chocolate Soldier" which was performed at Middlesbrough, Sheffield, Huddersfield, Dalston, Salisbury, Bristol, Cardiff, Manchester, Liverpool and Leamington. Then there was a summer season at the Winter Gardens, Bournemouth running through till the end of September.

1916 saw a run of the Revue "Joyland". May Morton was praised for her performance of the song "Rag-a-scale". It played in Liverpool for seven weeks, followed by Manchester, Glasgow, Edinburgh, Birmingham, Cardiff, Folkestone, Manchester again, Sheffield, Hanley, Dublin, Belfast, Glasgow (again), Plymouth, Southsea, Folkestone, Sunderland, West Hartlepool, Newcastle, Aberdeen, Dundee, Blackpool, continuing without a break in January 1917 across the country.

In 1918, she was performing in "Merry-go-round" around the country until September, then "Keep to the Right", "Go as you please" and "The River Girl" simultaneously. The war had ended but her performances continued into 1919, adding "Fall In" to the list of shows.

May Morton was engaged to Stanley Mohr on 5 December 1919 and they were married the following April. In spite of saying that she would give up work on her marriage, May Morton did return to the stage in 1937 playing “the chattering busybody friend of Mrs Blake” in Marie Oxenford’s comedy “The Worm that Turned”, which premiered at the De La Warr Pavilion in Bexhill (Brighton Evening Argus 1 December 1937). She played opposite Richard Goolden. The play was put on by the Forsyth Players.

May Morton died after a short illness in 1966. Her funeral took place at the South Downs Crematorium in Brighton.

== Personal life ==
May Morton married Major Stanley Mohr, an engineer, on 21 April 1920 at the Liberal Synagogue. They lived in London. Her son, Martin Jack Stanley, was born on 15 June 1923 and her daughter, Hilary Ann, on 22 June 1926. Martin Stanley served as an Allied fighter pilot during World War II; he was shot down and killed over Njimegen around 23 October 1944.

Marjorie’s first cousin was Doris Leslie, novelist, historical biographer and fiction writer.

Her father, Ernest Joseph was the first cousin of Sir Isaac Isaacs, 9th Governor General of Australia from 1930-1936.

== Filmography ==
| Title | Year | Role | Director(s) | Ref |
|---|---|---|---|---|
| The Stab of Disgrace | 1912 | Mary | Bert Haldane | |
| How Molly and Polly Got Pa's Consent | 1913 | Polly Perkins | Bert Haldane | |
| Polly the Girl Scout's Timely Aid | 1913 | Polly | Bert Haldane | |
| Polly the Girl Scout and Grandpa's Medals | 1913 | Polly | Bert Haldane | |
| Polly the Girl Scout and the Jewel Thieves | 1913 | Polly | Bert Haldane | |
| Just Like a Mother | 1913 | Betty Ware | Bert Haldane | |
| The Debt of Gambling | 1913 | French maid | Bert Haldane | |
| In the Toils of the Blackmailer | 1913 | Miss Morton | Alexander Butler | |
| East Lynne | 1913 | Joyce | Bert Haldane | |
| Britain's Secret Treaty | 1914 | Girl on rope | I.B. Davidson | |
| The Laugh on Dad | 1918 | May | A.C. Tinsdale | |
