= Dick Turpin's Ride to York =

1922 British film by Maurice Elvey

- Directed by: Maurice Elvey
- Written by: Leslie Howard Gordon
- Starring: Matheson Lang; Isobel Elsom; Cecil Humphreys
- Distributed by: Stoll Pictures
- Release date: 1922
- Running time: 80 minutes
- Country: United Kingdom
- Languages: Silent film English intertitles

Dick Turpin's Ride to York is a 1922 British historical silent film drama directed by Maurice Elvey and starring Matheson Lang, Isobel Elsom and Cecil Humphreys. It was the first feature-length film of the story of the famous 18th-century highwayman Dick Turpin and his legendary 200 mi (320 km) overnight ride from London to York on his mount Black Bess.

Dick Turpin's Ride to York was for many years assumed by film historians to be completely lost. However two reels of the film were among several rediscoveries in a private collection in the United States in 2003.

== Cast ==
- Matheson Lang as Dick Turpin
- Isobel Elsom as Esther Bevis
- Cecil Humphreys as Lytton Glover
- Norman Page as Ferret Bevis
- Lewis Gilbert as Tom King
- Lily Iris as Sally Dutton
- Malcolm Todd as Sir Charles Weston
- Madame d'Esterre as Lady Weston

== See also ==
- Hippodrama, a stage play in which live horses feature as characters
