= Bijou Fernandez =

American actress (1877–1961)

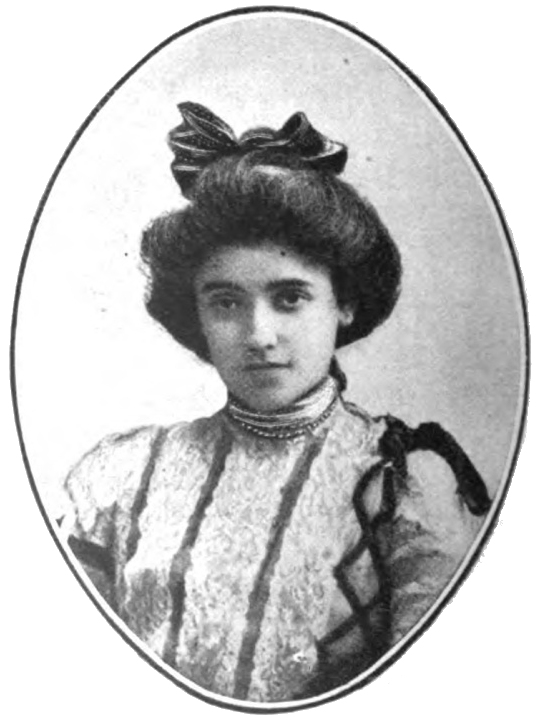
- Bijou Fernandez c. 1901
- Born: November 4, 1877; New York City, U.S.
- Died: November 7, 1961 (aged 84); New York City, U.S.
- Occupation: Actress
- Years active: 1884–1956
- Spouse: William L. Abingdon (m. 1906; died 1918)

Bijou Fernandez (November 4, 1877 – November 7, 1961) was an American stage and silent film actress. Her theatrical career endured for seven decades, from the 1880s until the mid 20th century. She appeared in a few movies in the silent film era.

== Early life and career ==
Bijou Fernandez was born in New York City on November 4, 1877. She was the daughter of Escamillo L. Fernandez and Emily L. Bradshaw, who was a noted theatrical agent.

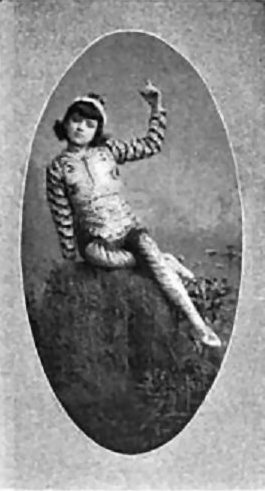
Fernandez as a child actress

As a youth she was tutored in acting by her mother. Fernandez, at the age of thirteen, was described in a review as "bright-eyed, slender, and fragile." Her voice and demeanour on stage were likened to "an unaffected child." She was not exceedingly precocious as was Bijou Heron, who acted the role of Adrienne in Monsieur Alphonse, as a juvenile player. She was a photographer's model known as the "photograph queen" in 1884. At the time she was under contract to Sarony to be photographed every day. For a May Blossom Picnic she wore a red check dress and danced in Central Park.

In August 1884, she acted nightly in May Blossom with fellow youth actress Gracie Levard. The venue of the production was the Madison Square Theatre, located near Broadway, on 24th Street, behind the Fifth Avenue Hotel. New scenery was painted when May Blossom moved to Niblo's Garden in February 1885. Fernandez played the part of Little May. She played Adriana, wife to Antipholus of Ephesus when A Comedy of Errors was staged at the Star Theatre, Broadway & 13th Street, in September 1885. The work of William Shakespeare was directed by Joseph Brooks. The following November Uncle Tom's Cabin was presented by the Third Avenue Theatre in Manhattan. Fernandez performed the role of Eva. Mr and Mrs G. C. Howard, whose daughter had been the original Eva, acted the characters of Topsy and St. Clair. The couple had been identified with the production of the novel by Harriet Beecher Stowe for over thirty years.

Fernandez proved popular as a page to Falstaff in The Merry Wives, a January 1886 production by Augustin Daly at Daly's Theatre on 30th Street. She was the recipient of a play, Peggy, The Fisherman's Child, written especially for her in 1887, and played in a production of it for the first time on June 7, at the Lyceum Theatre (New York). She accepted a contract with the Daly company in July 1887, which bound her to the firm for a period of seven years. The terms allowed Fernandez a liberal salary, furnished her stage costumes and all her clothing, and supervised her education. She was Puck in a production of A Midsummer Night's Dream at Daly's Theatre in February 1888.

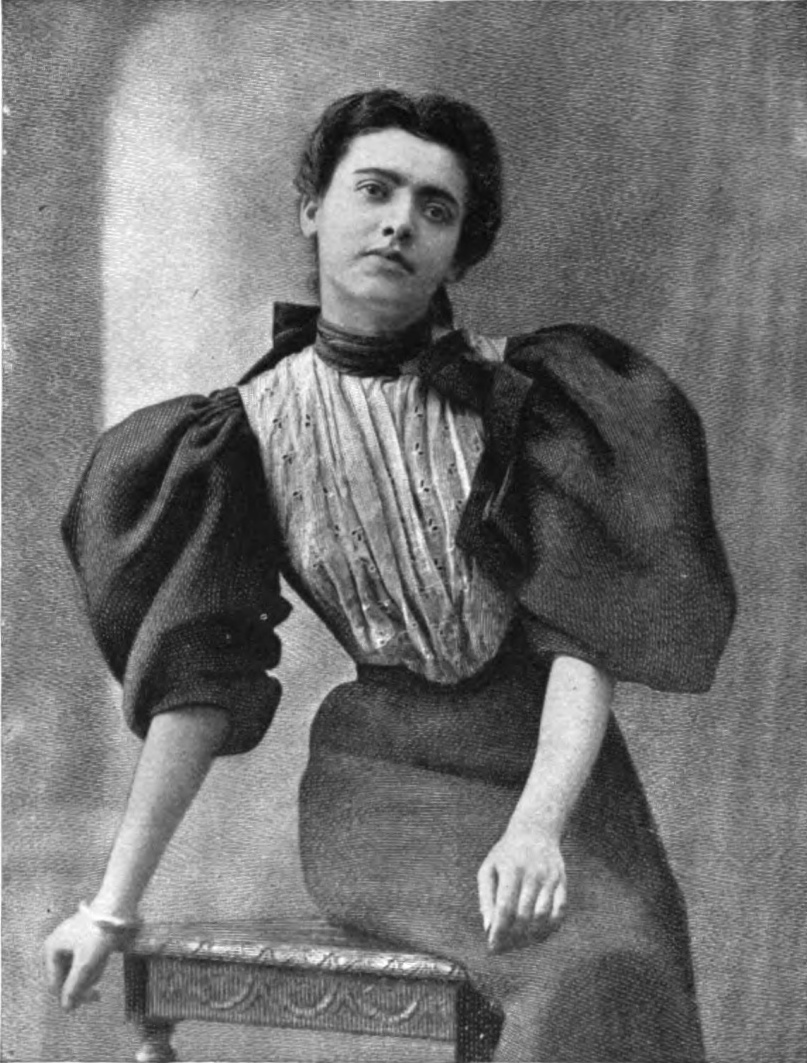
Fernandez, c. 1897

In preparation for her characterization of Allison Deyo in Hearts Aflame, in 1902, her mother felt she became too much like the character she was playing. The elder Fernandez remarked to a friend that her daughter had become preoccupied with riding horseback "in divided skirts, smoking cigarettes, and making high balls". She performed the role at the Garrick Theatre during the 1901 season before her mother's objections almost caused her to withdraw the following year.

In the fall of 1902 Fernandez teamed with Charles Waldron to lead the Herbert Stock Company in presenting Aristocracy by Bronson Howard. It was staged at the Circle Theatre, Broadway and Sixtieth Street. Adapted by David Belasco and Henry Churchill de Mille, the play was eventually called The Charity Ball. Fernandez portrayed Ann Cruger, the daughter of a Wall Street tycoon and an enemy of her sinful brother.

Fernandez married the English actor William L. Abingdon on May 29, 1906. For the summer of 1907, Fernandez appeared at the Elitch Theatre as part of the Summer stock cast. In 1910, she temporarily quit acting and began working as a theatrical agent. She joined Goldwyn Pictures in 1918 following the deaths of her mother and husband. Abingdon committed suicide in May 1918, in his home at 235 West Seventy-Sixth Street, New York City. Fernandez worked as a talent scout and later in the same capacity with both Metro Goldwyn Mayer and Warner Bros. She signed Patricia Collinge at the age of 16 and found her a role in The Queen of the Moulin Rouge. She appeared in New Toys (1925), a silent feature which stars Richard Barthelmess, Mary Hay, and Clifton Webb. In Just Suppose (1926), a story of the Prince of Wales who falls in love with an American woman, she played Mrs Stafford, mother to leading lady Lois Moran.

She played roles in The Girl I Left Behind Me as a member of the Empire Theatre Company, The Climbers with the Amelia Bingham Company, Arms and Man with Arnold Daly, and Man and Superman with Robert Lorraine. In 1937 Fernandez was in the cast of I'd Rather Be Right at the Alvin Theatre. The musical comedy was written by George S. Kaufman, Moss Hart, Richard Rodgers, and Lorenz Hart. George M. Cohan acted the part of President Franklin Delano Roosevelt.

Fernandez was among the honored actors at a tea given by the Drama League of New York at The Pierre Hotel, in November 1937. Her final stage role came in Prescott Proposals with Katharine Cornell in 1956.

== Death ==
Fernandez died following a short illness at University Hospital in New York City in 1961. She lived at the Lancaster Hotel, 22 East 38th Street.

She was a life member of the Episcopal Actors Guild and the Actors' Fund of America. She was elected as an Actors' Fund trustee for a three-year term on May 23, 1919.

She participated in the Stage Women's War Relief during World War I. For a number of years Fernandez managed the program distribution for several benefits conducted by The Players and The Lambs.
