= The Woman Who Did =

1895 novel by Grant Allen

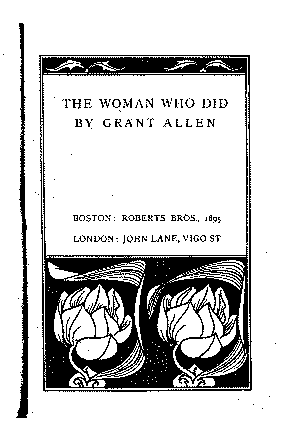
- From the original edition illustrated by Aubrey Beardsley
- Author: Grant Allen
- Language: English
- Publication date: 1895

The Woman Who Did (1895) is a novel by Grant Allen about a young, self-assured middle-class woman who defies convention as a matter of principle and who is fully prepared to suffer the consequences of her actions. It was first published in London by John Lane in a series intended to promote the ideal of the "New Woman". It was adapted into a British silent film in 1915, The Woman Who Did, which was directed by Walter West, and later into a 1925 German film, Die Frau mit dem schlechten Ruf.

== Plot summary ==
Herminia Barton, the Cambridge-educated daughter of a clergyman, frees herself from her parents' influence, moves to London and starts living alone. As she is not a woman of independent means, she starts working as a teacher. When she meets and falls in love with Alan Merrick, a lawyer, she suggests they live together without getting married. She believes that marriage inevitably means a woman's submission to her husband. Reluctantly, he agrees, and the couple move to Italy. There, in Perugia, Merrick dies of typhoid before their daughter Dolores is born. Legal technicalities and the fact that the couple were not married prevent Herminia from inheriting any of Merrick's money.

Dreaming of being a role model for Dolores and her friends, Herminia returns to England and raises her daughter as a single mother. She wants to show the younger generation that even as a woman there is something one can do about the unfair position of women in society—a small step maybe, but with more and larger steps to follow soon. However, Dolores turns out to be ashamed of her mother's unmarried state and gradually turns against her. Eventually, Herminia chooses to make a huge sacrifice for her daughter's benefit and commits suicide.

== Reception ==
Allen was sympathetic to the feminist cause and saw his novel as a way to promote women's rights. It certainly created an immediate popular sensation - Flora Thompson for instance describing how, in small-town Hampshire, "copies were bought and handed round until practically everyone of mature age in the village had read and passed judgement on it". However, the novel was also controversial right from the start, with conservative readers as well as feminists criticizing Allen for the heroine he had invented. For example, Victoria Crosse wrote her novel The Woman Who Didn't (1895) as a response to Allen's book and Mrs. Lovett Cameron wrote The Man Who Didn't.

Whereas Herminia Barton questions the institution of marriage by refusing to get married herself, Victoria Crosse's heroine Eurydice Williamson—"the woman who didn't"—remains faithful to her impossible husband although, during a passage from India, she meets a man who falls in love with her. Similarly, Lovett Cameron's hero is a married man who resists the temptation to stray.

Another novel written in reply to Allen's work, Lucas Cleeve's The Woman Who Wouldn't, (1895) sold well and received hostile reviews. The author said of this:

"If one young girl is kept from a loveless, mistaken marriage, if one frivolous nature is checked in her career of flirtation by remembrance of Lady Morris, I shall perhaps be forgiven by the public for raising my feeble voice in answer to The Woman Who Did".

The campaigner Emma Brooke saw this novel and her own novel "The Superfluous Woman" as important in trying to resolve the "Sex Question" which she thought dominated intellectual debate in the 1880s. She was annoyed when H. G. Wells reinvented the question when he spoke to the Fabian Society in 1906.

Sarah Grand, the feminist writer who coined the term "New Woman," considered the novel to have an important social purity moral, but only because Herminia comes to a sad end, not because she stands up for her principles:

Mr. Grant Allen is a large-minded, liberal man, and he argues that if men are permitted to practice polygamy then women should be equally free to indulge in polyandry. I do not know that he approves of polygamy, only he is liberal enough to say that if men are to claim sexual freedom then it should be accorded to women also. The story answers the question when followed to its logical conclusions, and shows very clearly that women have nothing to gain and everything to lose by renouncing the protection which legal marriage gives.

Thomas Hardy approved more of Allen's progressive aims in the novel, than of their artistic realisation.

Modern feminist critics are divided on their approach to the novel. Nicholas Ruddick, however, in his introduction to his scholarly edition of the novel, concludes that it had "a progressive goal and positive consequences. Indeed ... it may have added as much as any novel of its time to the sum of human happiness."
