= Scars of Love (film) =

- Directed by: Walter S. McColl
- Written by: Walter S. McColl
- Starring: Walter S. McColl; Mary McVean
- Production company: Austral Photoplay Company
- Release dates: 21 October 1918; 1919 (re-release)
- Running time: 5 reels
- Country: Australia
- Languages: Silent film English intertitles

Scars of Love is a 1918 Australian silent film. It is a lost film about which little is known except it is a melodrama featuring a Red Cross nurse and an Anzac soldier which climaxes in the European battlefields of World War I in which both leads die. It deals with the sins of the father visiting the children.

== Production ==
The film was most likely made by wealthy amateur enthusiasts. It was shot in Melbourne.

It was re-released in 1919 as Should Children Suffer.
