= God's Clay (1919 film) =

- Directed by: Arthur Rooke
- Based on: God's Clay by Claude Askew and Alice Askew
- Starring: Janet Alexander Humberston Wright Maud Yates
- Release date: 1919
- Country: United Kingdom
- Language: Silent (English intertitles)

God's Clay is a 1919 British silent drama film directed by Arthur Rooke and starring Janet Alexander, Humberston Wright and Maud Yates. It is an adaptation of the novel God's Clay by Claude Askew and Alice Askew. The story was adapted for a 1928 film God's Clay directed by Graham Cutts.

== Plot ==
A respectable woman's position in society is threatened by a blackmailer.

== Cast ==
- Janet Alexander as Angela Clifford
- Humberston Wright as Geoffrey Vance
- Maud Yates as Poppy Stone
- Arthur Rooke as Horace Newton
- Nancy Kenyon
- Adeline Hayden Coffin
- J. Hastings Batson
