= The Woman Who Did (1915 film) =

1915 film directed by Walter West

- Release date: 1915
- Country: United Kingdom
- Language: Silent

The Woman Who Did is a 1915 British silent drama film directed by Walter West and starring Eve Balfour, Thomas H. MacDonald and George Foley. It was adapted from the 1895 novel The Woman Who Did by Grant Allen. It follows the life of Herminia Barton, a Cambridge-educated woman as she tries to make it in the world by herself.

== Cast ==
- Eve Balfour
- Thomas H. MacDonald
- George Foley
- Lily Saxby
