= J. Hastings Batson =

English actor (1841–1921)

Abraham John Hastings Batson (8 November 1841 – 18 April 1921), usually credited as J. Hastings Batson, was an English stage actor of the Victorian and Edwardian era who went on to become a character actor in silent movies.

== Biography ==
Batson was born in Clerkenwell, London, in 1841. In October 1881 he played Iago in Othello, at Kilburn Town Hall, and was credited as John Hastings Batson.

In 1908 and 1909 he was a member of the executive committee of the Actors' Union, founded in 1907.

Batson played the leading role in The German Spy Peril (1914), a silent war propaganda film based loosely on the Guy Fawkes plot of 1605, with German spies planning to blow up the Houses of Parliament.

He died in the West Middlesex Hospital, Isleworth, Middlesex, on 18 April 1921, aged 79, leaving effects worth £50. At the time of his death his address was 26, Mountfield Road, Ealing.

== Filmography ==
- In the Hands of London Crooks (1913) : Sir James Linley
- Sixty Years a Queen (1913)
- Lights of London (1914)
- The German Spy Peril (1914)
- Jack Tar (1915) : Sir Michael Westwood
- The Scorpion's Sting (1915) : Bishop of Lowden
- She (1916)
- On the Banks of Allan Water (1916) : Sir John Warden
- The Little Damozel (1916) : Admiral Craven
- The House Opposite (1917)
- Just a Girl (1917) : The Duke
- A Gamble for Love (1917)
- The Woman Wins (1918) : Admiral Fraser
- Consequences (1918) : Guardian
- Because (1918)
- God's Clay (1919)
- The Soul of Guilda Lois (1919) : Gregoire
- With All Her Heart (1920) : Earl of Stanborough
