= Burnt Wings (1916 film) =

1916 British film by Walter West

- Directed by: Walter West
- Written by: R. Byron Webber; Mrs. Stanley Wrench
- Produced by: Walter West
- Starring: Eve Balfour; Joseph R. Tozer; Thomas H. MacDonald; Lily Saxby
- Release date: 1916
- Country: United Kingdom
- Language: English

Burnt Wings is a 1916 British silent drama film directed by Walter West and starring Eve Balfour, Joseph Tozer and Thomas H. MacDonald. It was adapted from the 1909 novel Burnt Wings by Mrs Stanley Wrench. A woman decides to bring up a baby that her husband has had with his mistress.

== Cast ==
- Eve Balfour — Margaret Dennis
- Joseph Tozer — Paul Westlake
- Thomas H. MacDonald — Frank Vane
- Lily Saxby — Lila Stebbing

== Bibliography ==
- Low, Rachael. The History of British Film, Volume III: 1914-1918. Routledge, 1997.
