= Roy Travers =

British actor (1883–1941)

Roy Travers (born 1883 in London) was a British actor. Travers appeared in a number of films (mostly directed by Kenelm Foss) made by Astra Films. He died in 1941.

== Selected filmography ==
- East Lynne (1913)
- Sixty Years a Queen (1913)
- Lights of London (1914)
- Tommy Atkins (1915)
- The Rogues of London (1915)
- The Lure of Drink (1915)
- The Man Who Bought London (1916)
- Diana and Destiny (1916)
- It Is for England (1916)
- Auld Lang Syne (1917)
- Little Women (1917)
- The Splendid Coward (1918)
- Ave Maria (1918)
- The Lackey and the Lady (1919)
- No. 5 John Street (1921)
- Cherry Ripe (1921)
- The Street of Adventure (1921)
- All Roads Lead to Calvary (1921)
- The Double Event (1921)
- A Romance of Old Baghdad (1922)
- The House of Peril (1922)
- The Hypocrites (1923)
- The Indian Love Lyrics (1923)
- Moonbeam Magic (1924)
- For Valour (1928)
- Q Ships (1928)
- Down Channel (1929)
- Romany Love (1931)
- Kiss Me Sergeant (1932)
