= Truth and Justice (1916 film) =

- Directed by: Bert Haldane
- Written by: Horatio Bottomley; G. Fletcher Hewitt
- Starring: Florence Alliston; Horatio Bottomley; Will Page
- Production company: Birmingham Film Producing Company
- Distributed by: Brum Films
- Release date: March 1916
- Country: United Kingdom
- Languages: Silent; English intertitles

Truth and Justice is a 1916 British silent drama film directed by Bert Haldane and starring Florence Alliston, Horatio Bottomley and Will Page.

== Cast ==
- Florence Alliston
- Horatio Bottomley as himself
- Will Page as The Husband

== Bibliography ==
- Low, Rachael. The History of British Film, Volume III: 1914-1918. Routledge, 1997.
