= Bert Haldane =

British film director

Bert Haldane (1871–1937) was a British film director of the silent era.

== Filmography ==
=== 1910 ===
- Coals of Fire (1910)
- Tried and Found True (1910)
- Cast Thy Bread Upon the Waters (1910)
- Behind the Scenes (1910)
- A Village Love Story (1910)
- The Thieves' Decoy (1910)
- The Queen of the May (1910)
- The Miser's Lesson (1910)
- Her Debt of Honour (1910)
- Hunger's Curse (1910)
- Dora (1910)
- Circumstantial Evidence (1910)
- All Is Not Gold That Glitters (1910)
- Woman vs. Woman (1910)
- The Farmer's Two Sons (1910)
- A Plucky Kiddie (1910)
- A Chum's Treachery (1910)

=== 1911 ===
- Right Is Might (1911)
- A Girl's Love Letter (1911)
- A Fool and His Money (1911)
- The Faith Healer (1911)
- The Road to Ruin (1911)
- The Man Who Kept Silent (1911)
- Lottery Ticket No. 66 (1911)
- The Silver Lining (1911)
- A Touch of Nature (1911)
- A Struggling Author (1911)
- A Nephew's Artifice (1911)
- The Convict's Sister (1911)
- The Baby and the Bomb (1911)
- Kiddie (1911)
- Hilda's Lovers (1911)
- For Better or Worse (1911)
- Elsie, the Gamekeeper's Daughter (1911)
- The Trail of Sand (1911)
- The Torn Letter (1911)
- Proud Clarissa (1911)
- Jack's Sister (1911)
- An' Good in the Worst of Us (1911)
- Wealthy Brother John (1911)
- His Son (1911)
- A Burglar for a Night (1911)
- The Impediment (1911)
- A Bid for Fortune (1911)
- The Reclamation of Snarky (1911)
- The Broad Arrow (1911)

=== 1912 ===
- The Girl at the Lodge
- Bill's Temptation
- A Night of Peril
- The Child Detective
- Phoebe of the Inn
- Our Bessie
- A Girl Alone
- The Blind Heroine
- His Actress Daughter
- Bill's Reformation
- The Deception
- When Gold Is Dross
- The Birthday That Mattered
- A Dumb Matchmaker
- Was He Justified?
- The Disinherited Nephew
- Ethel's Danger
- The Poacher's Fight for Liberty
- The Little Poacher
- The Irony of Fate
- Pippin Up to His Pranks
- Peter Pickles' Wedding
- Only an Outcast
- Her Better Self
- The Trail of the Fatal Ruby
- The Reward of Perseverance
- The Poacher's Reform
- The Eccentric Uncle's Will
- His Honour at Stake
- Won by a Snapshot
- Neighbours
- Muriel's Double
- A Fight for Life
- A Brother's Sacrifice
- The Stab of Disgrace
- The Fighting Parson
- The Draughtsman's Revenge
- Robert's Lost Supper
- Jeff's Downfall
- How Vandyck Won His Wife
- How Molly and Polly Got Pa's Consent
- For Baby's Sake
- The Lieutenant's Bride (1912)
- Her Sacrifice

=== 1913 ===
- Was He a Coward?
- The Turning Point
- The Interrupted Honeymoon
- That Awful Pipe
- Mary of Briarwood Dell
- Suspicious Mrs. Brown
- Peter Tries Suicide
- The Price of Deception
- Alfred Harding's Wooing
- Allan Field's Warning
- A Village Scandal
- The Debt of Gambling
- Zaza the Dancer
- When Paths Diverge
- Polly the Girl Scout and the Jewel Thieves
- Polly the Girl Scout's Timely Aid
- Peter Pens Poetry
- Luggage in Advance
- A Lucky Escape for Dad
- Just Like a Mother
- Polly the Girl Scout and Grandpa's Medals
- The Test
- A Double Life
- Binks' Wife's Uncle
- Uncle as Cupid
- Never Forget the Ring
- East Lynne
- Now She Lets Him Go Out
- Little Elsie
- Molly's Burglar
- In the Shadow of Darkness
- Fisherman's Luck
- Humanity; or, Only a Jew
- Younita
- Sixty Years a Queen

=== 1914 ===
- A Brother's Atonement
- The Lure of London
- The Last Encampment
- By His Father's Orders
- Lights of London
- Jim the Fireman
- The Last Round
- As a Man Sows; or, An Angel of the Slums
- Your Country Needs You
- The German Spy Peril
- Their Only Son
- His Sister's Honour

=== 1915 ===
- Tommy Atkins
- Beneath the Mask
- Jane Shore
- Darkest London: or, The Dancer's Romance
- The Rogues of London
- Five Nights
- Do Unto Others
- By the Shortest of Heads
- Brigadier Gerard
- Poor Clem
- Cowboy Clem
- The Knut and the Kernel
- The Barnstormers
- Jack Tar

=== 1916 ===
- The Lady Slavey
- Some Detectives
- Truth and Justice

=== 1917 ===
- Men Were Deceivers Ever
- A Boy Scout's Dream; or, How Billie Captured the Kaiser
- A Birmingham Girl's Last Hope
- The Child and the Fiddler

=== 1918/1919 ===
- The Ticket-of-Leave Man
- The Romance of Lady Hamilton

=== 1920 ===
- The Grip of Iron
- Mary Latimer, Nun
- The Woman and Officer 26
- The Winding Road

=== 1922 ===
- The Affected Detective
- Gipsy Blood
- Eliza's Romeo
- Auntie's Wedding Present
