= Henry VIII (film) =

1911 film by Will Barker

- Directed by: Henry Edwards
- Produced by: William Barker
- Starring: Herbert Beerbohm Tree
- Release date: 1911
- Country: United Kingdom
- Languages: Silent; English intertitles

Henry VIII (1911) is a British historical film based on the play of the same name by William Shakespeare. The film consisted of scenes from the play; it was released for six weeks before all copies were burnt. At a time when films based on Shakespeare plays were common, the film was considered to have a unique appeal and had considerable success. It was well-viewed in contemporary newspapers.

== Plot ==
Little is known about the film's plot. It was an abridged version of the William Shakespeare's play Henry VIII. The film consisted of five scenes from the play in chronological order. The Stage, a newspaper focused on entertainment, listed the film's contents as "the scene in the Cloisters, with the arrest of [the duke of] Buckingham; the gorgeous spectacle of revelry in the Banqueting Hall at Wolsey's Palace, with the singling out of Anne Boleyn by the King; the Trial of Queen Katharine, at Blackfriars; the Fall of Wolsey, in the scene of the Ante-chamber with adjoining chapel; and the brilliant pageant of the Coronation of Anne in Westminster Abbey."

== Background, production and release ==
Thirty-six film adaptions of Shakespeare plays were produced between 1908 and 1913. Most of these were of American origin; American films were cheap to import and dominated the British market. Films in these period appealed mainly to a working-class audience and were often shown among other entertainment in music halls. This demographic found Shakespeare's violent and romantic storylines exciting. "Picture palaces" were also being built which appealed to a middle-class demographic that were poorer than theatre audiences but wealthier than music hall audiences.

The film was produced by William Barker and starred Herbert Beerbohm Tree. It was the most expensive film based on a Shakespeare play that had then been made and Tree was paid £1,000, a very high salary by the standards of the time. Filming was conducted over a single day. The film was released for a six week period beginning in March 1911. Twenty reels of the film were made; Barker personally arranged the circulation of ten of these in London and rented ten to a distribution company to be shown elsewhere. All the reels were recalled at the end of the six weeks. They were then burnt outside Ealing Studios in London in view of a group of journalists and passers-by.

== Reaction ==
It was the most successful film adaption of a Shakespeare play that had then been produced; no records exist but academic Cary DiPietro estimates that approximately 200,000 viewers saw the film. DiPietro suggests that the film's short release period and Tree's acting prestige gave the film a unique appeal. Barker also conducting a promotional campaign which was unusually large by the standards of the time. An advertisement in a trade magazine, The Bioscope, commented that the films cast included "many of Britain's leadings actors and actresses" and warned "Naturally the demand for such a film is enormous ... there is now only a very limited number of copies available ... it is a vital necessity that applications for exhibiting this wonderfully vivid and life-like portrayal of some of the leading characters in English history should be made without delay." The Dundee Evening Telegraph, a local newspaper, expressed some cynicism commenting that "An effort is being made in London to give an almost continuous bioscope [film] production of the leading scenes in " Henry VIII.," as it is now at His Majesty's [theatre]. How far the public will relish these dumb [silent] reproductions of the great scenes of the drama remains to be seen."

The Stage, a newspaper focused on entertainment, gave a positive review commented that the film had "admirable clearness and realistic effect". The film was described by local newspapers the Kensington News and West London Times and Southwark and Bermondsey Recorder respectively as "beautiful" and "splendid". An article in the South Wales Argus commented that it was a "magnificent film ... played by British actors". The Cheshire Observer commented that "The taking of the film is a great triumph in photography, the histrionic art of England's great actors and actresses being shown with great clearness, while the story of Cardinal Wolsey at the zenith of his power, to his downfall and coronation of Ann Boleyn, is portrayed in such a manner as to impress the observer with the high merit of the original production and the cleverness of the pictorial representations." Alfred Edward Taylor wrote in an American trade magazine, The Moving Picture World;

[The film is a] great triumph of the kinematographer’s art. The picture is without doubt the greatest that has even been attempted in the country, and I am almost tempted to say in any other.

== Bibliography ==
- DiPietro, Cary (8 October 2003). "Shakespeare in the Age of Mechanical Reproduction: Cultural Discourse and the Film of Tree's 'Henry VIII'". New Theatre Quarterly. 19 (4): 352–365. doi:10.1017/s0266464x03000241. ISSN 0266-464X.
