= William L. Abingdon =

English stage actor (1859–1918)

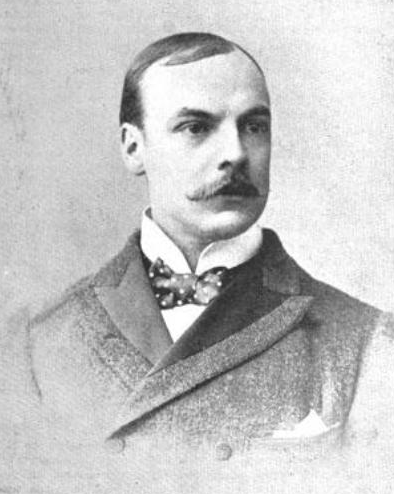
- In The Sketch, 28 November 1894
- Born: William Lepper Pilgrim; 2 May 1859; Towcester, England
- Died: 17 May 1918 (aged 59); New York City, US
- Burial place: Woodlawn Cemetery
- Occupation: Actor
- Spouses: Rachel de Solla (divorced) Bijou Fernandez (m. 1906)
- Children: 1

William Lepper Pilgrim (stage name Abingdon; 2 May 1859 – 17 May 1918) was an English stage actor who settled in the United States. As well as enjoying a lengthy theatre career, he appeared in four silent films during the 1910s.

== Biography ==
William L. Pilgrim was born in Towcester on 2 May 1859. He attended private school, and worked as a bank clerk until age 18. He then left to pursue a career in theatre.

=== Early career ===
Pilgrim began his professional stage career in England during the 1880s, establishing himself in London's West End by the early 1890s. He adopted the stage name "Abingdon" early in his career, possibly inspired by the town of Abingdon in Oxfordshire.

=== American career ===
In the early 1900s, Abingdon emigrated to the United States, joining the thriving American theatre scene. He quickly established himself as a character actor, performing in numerous stage productions across major theatrical circuits. His American debut came at the Empire Theatre in New York in September 1904.

=== Personal life ===
He married twice, first to British actress Rachel de Solla, and then to American actress Bijou Fernandez on May 29, 1906.

His son William (1888–1959), from his first marriage, also took the surname Abingdon and became a stage director who was later awarded an M.B.E. for his contributions to theatre.

=== Death ===
He committed suicide at his home in New York City on 17 May 1918, and was buried at Woodlawn Cemetery.

== Legacy ==
Abingdon's theatrical papers and memorabilia were donated to the New York Public Library for the Performing Arts shortly after his death. His work represents an important example of the transatlantic theatrical migration that characterized the late 19th and early 20th-century entertainment world.

== Filmography ==
- Manon Lescaut (1914)
- The Kiss of Hate (1916)
- Panthea (1917)
- Fedora (1918)
