= Will Barker (director) =

British film director (1868–1951)

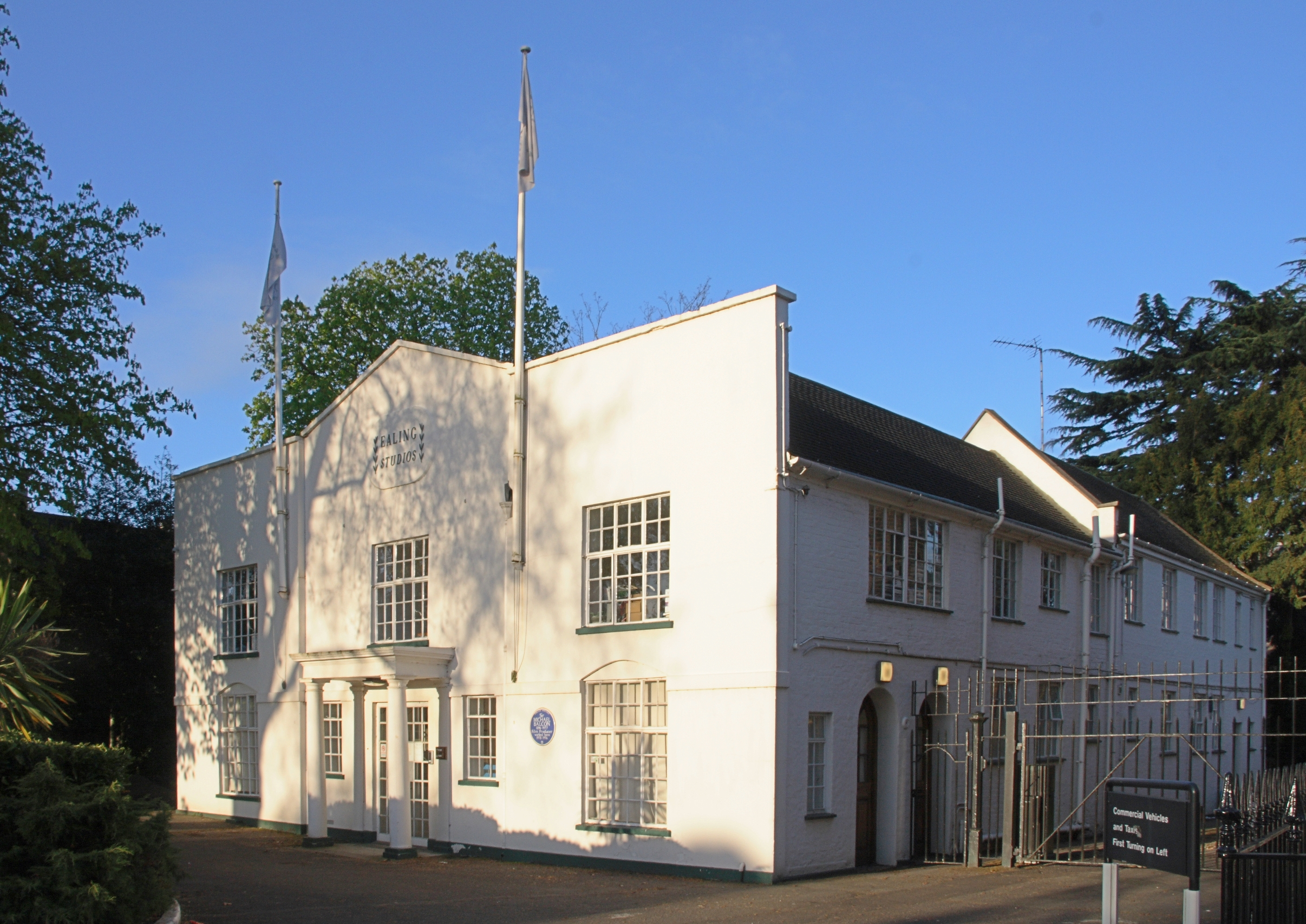
The Lodge as it is today now renamed the White House

William George Barker (18 January 1868, in Cheshunt – 6 November 1951, in Wimbledon) was a British film producer, director, cinematographer, and entrepreneur who took film-making in Britain from a low budget form of novel entertainment to the heights of lavishly produced epics that were matched only by Hollywood for quality and style.

== Biography ==
=== Early career ===
His early career was that of a commercial traveller. He was evidently successful enough at this that he was able to indulge his interest in photography. In 1901 he started a business at 50 Gray's Inn Road, Holborn for the purposes of making moving pictures on a hand cranked Lumiere camera, which had bought a few years before and then showing the resulting films to the public -for a fee. This was the Autoscope Company. Like the early Mitchell and Kenyon films, the genre was mainly 'topicals'; for they require the least amount of preparation and expense.

On 1 January 1906 it merged with the Warwick Trading Company with Barker as the managing director.

Having left Warwick he set up Barker Motion Photography Limited in December 1909 at Number 1 Soho Square, Westminster, London. Now he wanted to shoot film using set stages regardless of the weather. Having already purchased a house called "The Lodge", Ealing (now renamed the White Lodge, Ealing Studios) overlooking Ealing Green, he procured the adjacent property two years later in 1904. This second house was set back from Ealing Green behind a school on the west side, and was therefore known as the West Lodge. Having 3.8 acres (1.5 ha) of land there was plenty of room to build stages, which he did, three in number. Back then, early Edwardian Ealing had two striking similarities to modern day Ealing: it still looks majestic (hence its title 'Queen of the Suburbs') and in the words of one writer "it still ain't Hollywood". Therefore, the original stages were built with very tall glass walls and roofs to make the most of the available light whilst keeping out the British weather. By 1912 this had become the largest film studio in Britain and possibly Europe. Many productions were released under his trademark of Bulldog Films.

=== American market ===
At that time British cinema started facing two important problems. One was the restrictive practises of the new Motion Picture Patents Company, which prevented English films from being shown to audiences in America. Hitherto, foreign films had prominence on American screens. This cartel effectively put a limit on the revenue that English film-makers could hope to receive for their investment. Secondly, film prints copies were purchased out right by the distributor. This meant a popular film would not earn the film maker any more than an unsuccessful one. However, it also meant that the audiences had no choice but to see ever degrading prints that had become evermore scratched through repeated use. As more and more frames were lost due to multiple re-splicing and general damage, so the action would unexpectedly jump forward whilst the film was being watched. The first problem he attempted to rectify by travelling to America to voice his support at the International Projecting and Producing Company (IPPC) meeting of February 1909. This organisation had been set up in the vain hope of challenging the cartel's dominance.

=== Advancing the British film industry ===
He then set about to improve the viewing experience of the public by popularising films which were released on a rental only basis. The very first of these for hire only films is now considered by film buffs to be the first important British film. This is despite no copies of this production surviving.

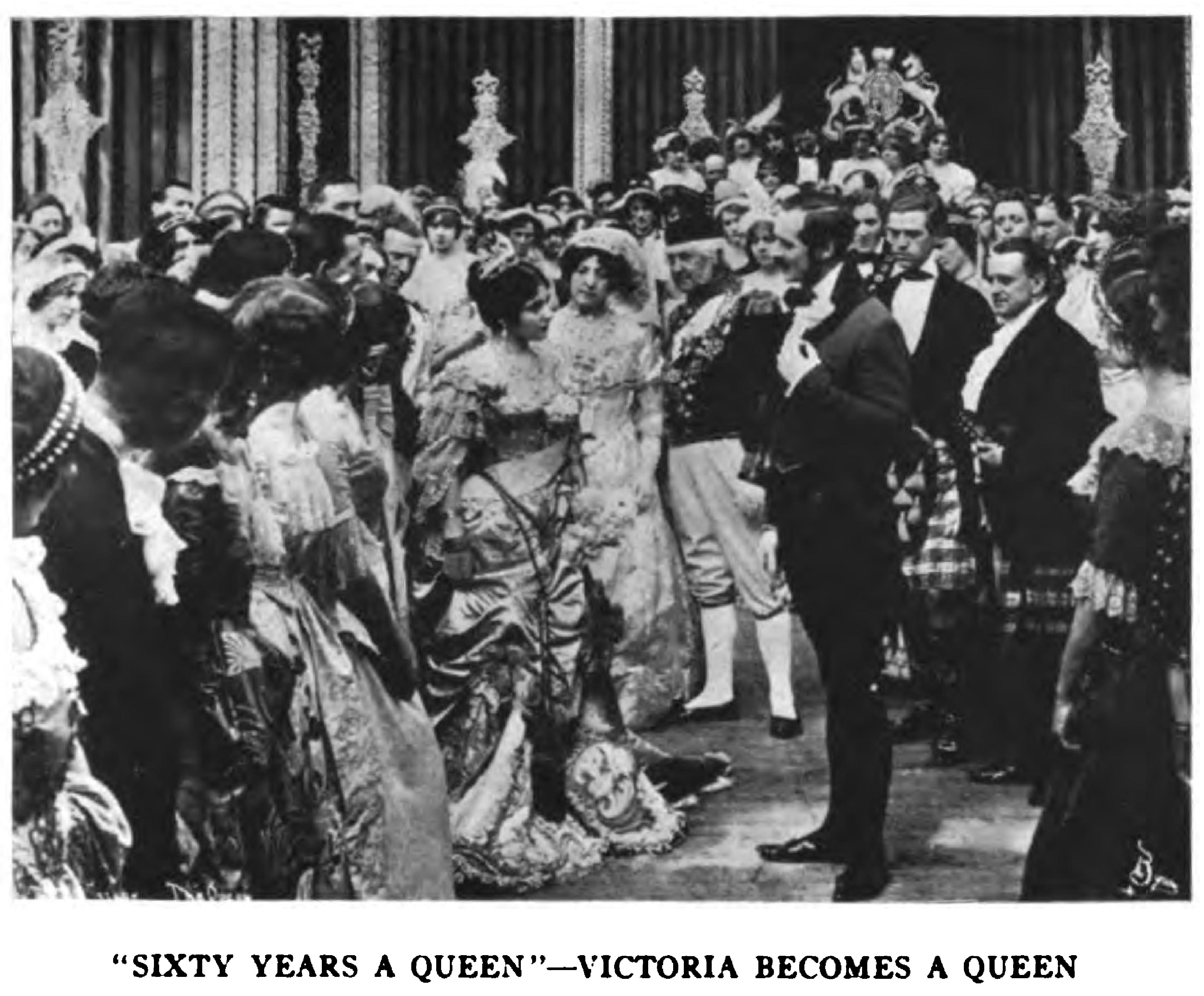
Still from Sixty Years a Queen

This film was a lavish adaptation of Henry VIII. Barker even used some of the original stage sets from Her Majesty's Theatre. He was reported to have paid Sir Herbert Beerbohm Tree (who was actor/manager of the before-said theatre), £1,000 for doing his interpretation of Cardinal Wolsey for the film. After being shown to record audiences, the total film stock was ceremoniously burned before the press to promote hired films as a way of ensuring the public saw only good quality stock whilst at the same time maximise his own profits by maintaining control of the prints.

Another entrepreneur and film distributor called G.B. Samuelson, persuaded Barker to make what became another very important British film: Sixty Years a Queen (1913) about the life of Victoria. Samuelson, also heavily financed the production of this film and so further increased his fortune through its success. After Barker made his last films in the 1920s, Samuelson went on in 1924 to found the Southall Film Studio, just 4 miles (6.4 km) west in a converted aircraft hangar which stood in Gladstone Road. Unfortunately both studios then suffered from the recession.

He died on 6 November 1951 in Wimbledon, London.

In 2001 and after many changes of ownership at Ealing Studios, Ealing Council approved planning permission to demolish the West Lodge as part of a major new studio development project; the original Lodge survives as studio offices.

== List of films ==
Beerbohm Tree as Cardinal Wolsey

Short Films:

- The Child Stealers (1904)

Topicals:

- London Day by Day (1906)

Film Series:

- Cape to Cairo (1907).

Feature films:

- Henry VIII (1911)

screen composer: Edward German

- East Lynne ( 1913)
- Sixty Years a Queen (1913)

B&W : Eight reels / 7500 feet

Format: standard 35 mm spherical 1.37:1

Director: Bert Haldane.

Cast: Blanche Forsythe, Mrs. Lytton, J. Hastings Batson, Jack Brunswick, Gilbert Esmond, Fred Paul, Roy Travers, E. Story Gofton, Rolf Leslie. Will Barker Film Company production. Produced by Will Barker, Jack Smith and Ernest Shirley in association with G.B. Samuelson. Scenario by G. B. Samuelson, Arthur Shirley and Harry Engholm, from a book by Sir Herbert Maxwell.

- She

Jane Shore (1915) Director: F. Martin Thornton.

== Further reading and research ==
- Perry, George (1981) Forever Ealing: a celebration of the great British film studio. Pavilion Press, London
- Ealing Library's Local History Department also has in its archives, photographs and articles about film production in Ealing.
- Allen Eyles and David Meeker (1992) Missing Believed Lost: The Great British Film Search. BFI Publishing ISBN 978-0-85170-306-0.
