= Fettered =

- Directed by: Arrigo Bocchi
- Written by: Joan Sutherland (novel); Kenelm Foss
- Starring: Manora Thew; Hayford Hobbs; Fred Morgan
- Production company: Windsor Films
- Distributed by: Ideal Film Company
- Release date: August 1919
- Country: United Kingdom
- Languages: Silent; English intertitles

Fettered is a 1919 British silent drama film directed by Arrigo Bocchi and starring Manora Thew, Hayford Hobbs and Fred Morgan. The film is based on a novel by Joan Sutherland.

== Cast ==
- Manora Thew as Sheila Clavering
- Hayford Hobbs as Lucien de Guise
- Fred Morgan as Rocci
- Charles Vane as General Clavering
- Evelyn Harding as Lady Clavering
- Bert Wynne as Harry Logan
- Peggy Patterson as Monica Hewlett
- George Butler as Captain Galveston
- Ethel Royale as Lady Mortimer

== Bibliography ==
- Low, Rachael. History of the British Film, 1918-1929. George Allen & Unwin, 1971.
