= A Little Bit of Fluff =

A Little Bit of Fluff may refer to:

- A Little Bit of Fluff (play), 1915 by Walter Ellis
- A Little Bit of Fluff (1919 film), adaptation by Kenelm Foss
- A Little Bit of Fluff (1928 film), adaptation
