= The Slave (Hichens novel) =

1899 novel

- Author: Robert Hichens
- Language: English
- Genre: Drama
- Publisher: Heinemann
- Publication date: 1899
- Publication place: United Kingdom
- Media type: Print

The Slave is an 1899 novel by the British writer Robert Hichens.

== Adaptation ==
In 1918, it was adapted into a silent film of the same title directed by Arrigo Bocchi and starring Hayford Hobbs and Charles Vane.

== Bibliography ==
- Goble, Alan. The Complete Index to Literary Sources in Film. Walter de Gruyter, 1999.
- Vinson, James. Twentieth-Century Romance and Gothic Writers. Macmillan, 1982.
