= Cavendish Morton =

Cavendish Morton may refer to:

- Cavendish Morton (actor) (1874–1939), British actor, photographer, and art director
- Cavendish Morton (artist) (1911–2015), British painter and illustrator
