= Peace, Perfect Peace =

- Directed by: Arrigo Bocchi
- Written by: Kenelm Foss
- Starring: Hayford Hobbs; Mary Odette; Charles Vane
- Production company: Windsor Films
- Distributed by: Walturdaw
- Release date: December 1919
- Country: United Kingdom
- Languages: Silent; English intertitles

Peace, Perfect Peace is a 1918 British silent drama film directed by Arrigo Bocchi and starring Hayford Hobbs, Mary Odette and Mary Marsh Allen. The Armistice that ends the First World War allows French and British soldiers to return home.

== Cast ==
- Hayford Hobbs as Poilu
- Mary Odette as Marie Odette
- Mary Marsh Allen as Mrs. Atkins
- Charles Vane as Pensioner
- Bert Wynne as Tommy Atkins
- Evelyn Harding as Mother
- Chubby Hobbs as Child

== Bibliography ==
- Low, Rachael. The History of British Film, Volume III: 1914-1918. Routledge, 1997. ISBN 978-0-415-15451-2.
