= Whosoever Shall Offend =

- Directed by: Arrigo Bocchi
- Written by: Francis Marion Crawford (novel); Kenelm Foss
- Starring: Kenelm Foss; Mary Odette; Hayford Hobbs
- Production company: Windsor Films
- Distributed by: Walturdaw
- Release date: February 1919
- Country: United Kingdom
- Languages: Silent; English intertitles

Whosoever Shall Offend is a 1919 British silent crime film directed by Arrigo Bocchi and starring Kenelm Foss, Mary Odette and Mary Marsh Allen. The screenplay concerns a man murders his wife in Italy and then tries to marry a wealthy women.

== Cast ==
- Kenelm Foss as Guido Falco
- Mary Odette as Aurora
- Mary Marsh Allen as Regina
- Hayford Hobbs as Marcello Consalvi
- Evelyn Harding as Signora Consalvi
- Charles Vane as Ercole
- Maud Cressall as Countess Del Armi
- Barbara Everest as Maddalena
- Philip Hewland as Professor Kalmon
- Joyce Templeton as Regina (child)

== Bibliography ==
- Low, Rachael. History of the British Film, 1918-1929. George Allen & Unwin, 1971.
