= When It Was Dark (film) =

- Directed by: Arrigo Bocchi
- Written by: Guy Thorne (novel); Kenelm Foss
- Starring: Manora Thew; Hayford Hobbs; George Butler
- Production company: Windsor Films
- Distributed by: Walturdaw
- Release date: October 1919
- Country: United Kingdom
- Languages: Silent; English intertitles

When It Was Dark is a lost 1919 British silent drama film directed by Arrigo Bocchi and starring Manora Thew, Hayford Hobbs and George Butler. It is an adaptation of the 1903 novel of the same title by Guy Thorne.

== Cast ==
- Manora Thew as Gertrude Hunt
- Hayford Hobbs as Reverend Basil Gortrie
- George Butler as Constantin Sharke
- Charles Vane as Professor Llewellyn
- Evelyn Harding as Princess Lontaine
- Bert Wynne as Harold Spence
- Peggy Patterson as Helen Byars
- Judd Green as Father Riposi
- Arthur Walcott as Governor

== Bibliography ==
- Low, Rachael. History of the British Film, 1918-1929. George Allen & Unwin, 1971.
