= The Man and the Moment (1918 film) =

1918 film by Arrigo Bocchi

- Directed by: Arrigo Bocchi
- Written by: Elinor Glyn (novel); Kenelm Foss
- Starring: Manora Thew; Hayford Hobbs; Charles Vane
- Production company: Windsor Films
- Distributed by: Walturdaw
- Release date: July 1918
- Country: United Kingdom
- Languages: Silent; English intertitles

The Man and the Moment is a 1918 British silent drama film directed by Arrigo Bocchi and starring Manora Thew, Hayford Hobbs and Charles Vane. It is an adaptation of the 1914 novel of the same name by Elinor Glyn.

== Plot ==
An American heiress marries a Scottish aristocrat. She leaves him and goes to Italy, but later returns.

== Cast ==
- Manora Thew as Sabine Delburg
- Hayford Hobbs as Lord Michael Arranstoun
- Charles Vane as Lord Henry Fordyce
- Maud Cressall as Princess Morava
- Peggy Carlisle as Miss Van der Water
- Jeff Barlow as Armstrong
- Kenelm Foss as Prince Torniloni

== See also ==
- Mad Hour (1928)
- The Man and the Moment (1929)

== Bibliography ==
- Low, Rachael. The History of British Film, Volume III: 1914-1918. Routledge, 1997.
