= Splendid Folly =

- Directed by: Arrigo Bocchi
- Written by: Margaret Pedlar (novel); Hedley Sedgwick
- Starring: Manora Thew; Hayford Hobbs; Evelyn Harding
- Production company: Windsor Films
- Distributed by: Walturdaw
- Release date: November 1919
- Country: United Kingdom
- Languages: Silent; English intertitles

Splendid Folly is a 1919 British silent romance film directed by Arrigo Bocchi and starring Manora Thew, Hayford Hobbs and Evelyn Harding. The film is set in Naples and was shot on location in Italy, and at Catford Studios in London. It is based on a novel by Margaret Pedlar.

== Plot ==
A playwright's wife leaves him when she mistakenly believes he has taken a mistress. She becomes a renowned opera singer.

== Cast ==
- Manora Thew as Diana Quentin
- Hayford Hobbs as Mr. Errington
- Evelyn Harding as Adrienne de Gervais
- Charles Vane as Baroni
- Bert Wynne
- Peggy Patterson
- George Butler
- Eileen McGrath
- James English

== Bibliography ==
- Low, Rachael. History of the British Film, 1918-1929. George Allen & Unwin, 1971.
