= Cherry Ripe =

Cherry Ripe may refer to:

- "Cherry Ripe" (song), an English poetic song with lyrics from the 16th or 17th century
- Cherry Ripe (novel), an 1878 British novel
- Cherry Ripe (painting), an 1879 oil painting by the English artist John Everett Millais
- Cherry Ripe (film), a 1921 British silent film based on the 1878 novel of the same name
- Cherry Ripe (chocolate bar), an Australian brand of chocolate bar first introduced in 1924
- Cherry Ripe (numbers station), a suspected cryptic British radio station commencing transmissions in the late 1960s
