= The Top Dog =

- Directed by: Arrigo Bocchi
- Written by: Fergus Hume (novel); Kenelm Foss
- Starring: Kenelm Foss; Mary Odette; Hayford Hobbs
- Production company: Windsor Films
- Distributed by: Walturdaw
- Release date: September 1918
- Country: United Kingdom
- Languages: Silent; English intertitles

The Top Dog is a 1918 British silent drama film directed by Arrigo Bocchi and starring Kenelm Foss, Mary Odette and Hayford Hobbs. It was made at Catford Studios.

== Cast ==
- Kenelm Foss as Jerry Perris
- Mary Odette as Margaret Drum
- Hayford Hobbs as Dick Drum
- Charles Vane as Sir Gregory Horne
- Evelyn Harding as Mademoiselle Cibot
- Edward O'Neill as The Octopus
- Douglas Munro as Mr. Margin
- Bert Wynne as Pedro Medina
- Clive Currie as Giles

== Bibliography ==
- Goble, Alan. The Complete Index to Literary Sources in Film. Walter de Gruyter, 1999.
