= All Roads Lead to Calvary =

All Roads Lead to Calvary may refer to:

- All Roads Lead to Calvary (novel), a 1919 novel by Jerome K. Jerome
- All Roads Lead to Calvary (film), a 1921 film adaptation directed by Kenelm Foss
