= The Wages of Sin (1918 film) =

- Directed by: Arrigo Bocchi
- Written by: Kenelm Foss
- Starring: Kenelm Foss; Mary Odette; Hayford Hobbs
- Production company: Windsor Films
- Distributed by: Walturdaw
- Release date: November 1918
- Country: United Kingdom
- Languages: Silent; English intertitles

The Wages of Sin is a 1918 British silent drama film directed by Arrigo Bocchi and starring Kenelm Foss, Mary Odette and Hayford Hobbs. It is based on the 1891 novel of the same name by Lucas Malet.

== Cast ==
- Kenelm Foss as Colthurst
- Mary Odette as Mary Crookenden
- Mary Marsh Allen as Jenny Parris
- Hayford Hobbs as Lance Crookenden
- Charles Vane as Cyprian Aldham
- Edward O'Neill as Bill Parris
- Bert Wynne as Steve Kingdom
- Arthur Walcott as Isaacstein
- Judd Green as Wilmot
- Harry Lofting as Captain Prust

== Bibliography ==
- Goble, Alan. The Complete Index to Literary Sources in Film. Walter de Gruyter, 1999.
