= Dorothy Minto =

Scottish actress (c.1886–1957)

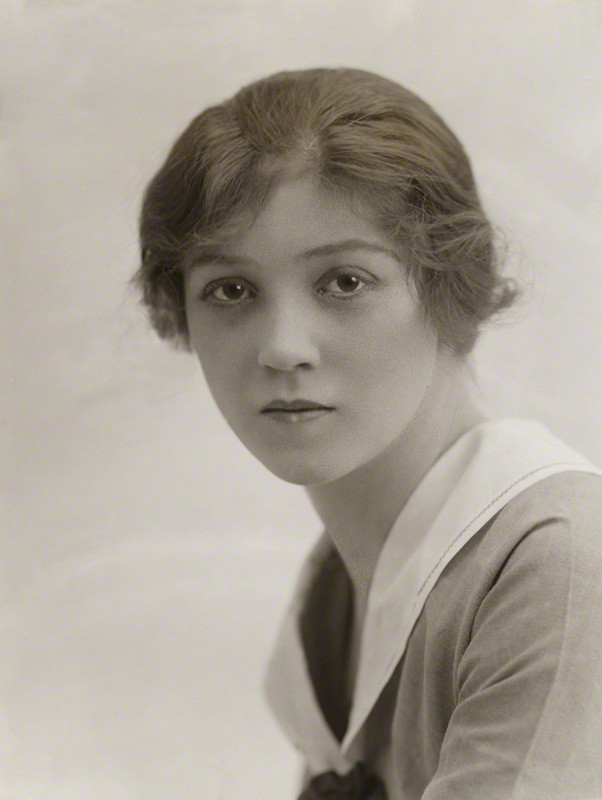
- Dorothy Minto in 1914
- Born: Dorothy Scott c. 21 February 1886 probably Edinburgh, Scotland
- Died: 6 December 1957 (aged 71); Chelsea, London, England
- Occupation: Actress
- Years active: 1904–1936
- Spouses: Shiel Barry (m. 1907; died 1916) Robert Geoffrey Buxton (m. 1921; div. 1928)

Dorothy Minto (née Scott) (c. 21 February 1886 – 6 December 1957) was a prominent actress on the London stage between 1905 and the mid-1930s, notably appearing in the first runs of several plays written by George Bernard Shaw. She also featured in a small number of films between 1916 and 1936. While her early stage career concentrated on classical plays and serious new work, from 1912 onwards she devoted herself more to musicals and comedies.

== Early life ==
Many references to Dorothy Minto state or imply that she was born in 1891 (for instance, her entry in Who's Who in the Theatre, 1925, gives her date of birth as 21 Feb 1891). This is based on the assumption that she was just 14 years old when playing Juliet in a 1905 production of Romeo and Juliet. However, she was (almost certainly) born in 1886 and raised as Dorothy Scott. She was very probably the daughter of Harriett Chambers of Edinburgh, a member of the publishing family that produced the Chambers Dictionary.

Dorothy Scott grew up in Acton, Middlesex and the Kensington area of London. In the 1891 and 1901 censuses she was living with Harriett Chambers, described as a 'visitor' born in Edinburgh. She took acting tuition at an establishment run by Mrs. Crowe (née Kate Josephine Bateman, an actor in America and Britain who had opened an acting school in London in 1892). A photograph taken by Window & Grove of Baker St, probably while she was at acting school, is labelled "Miss Dorothy Minto Scott". She was known by the stage name of Dorothy Minto throughout her career.

== Stage career ==
=== First phase ===
In 1903/4 Dorothy Minto worked with F. R. Benson's company, beginning with small parts. Her breakthrough came in 1905 when she worked with William Poel's Elizabethan Stage Society and was cast as Juliet alongside Esmé Percy's Romeo. Subsequent legend put their ages at the time of the performance as 14 and 17, though a contemporary report in the London Daily Chronicle (6 May 1905) gave more realistic ages of 19 and 21. The production and the leading performances were critical successes and Minto went on to secure a number of prestigious roles in leading productions, including classical works by Shakespeare, Ibsen, Ben Jonson and Aristophanes and plays by new authors, most notably George Bernard Shaw (she was described as one of Shaw's favourite performers) but also John Galsworthy, J. M. Barrie and Harley Granville Barker amongst others. In 1907 she played in Elizabeth Robins' play "Votes for Women", the first suffragist play to be performed on the London stage, and she later became a member of the suffragist Actresses' Franchise League.

=== Second phase ===
From 1912 onwards, possibly influenced by her relationship with Morris Harvey (with whom she appeared that year in the review Hullo, Ragtime), Minto turned more to lighter - and perhaps more lucrative - roles, taking part in a series of musicals, reviews and comedies. These included productions by Irving Berlin and Nat Ayer, with whom she and Harvey appeared in Pell Mell in 1916. In 1920 she was a member of the London offshoot of the Grand Guignol company. During the 1920s she mixed lighter and more serious roles before retiring from the stage in the mid-1930s.

From the 1920s she regularly toured with new productions before they were brought to London. In 1923 she was described in print as an "Actress Manageress", a position shared at the time with only two others in London (Gladys Cooper and Marie Lohr). In 1927 she starred in Wild-Cat Hetty (renamed in London from its touring name, Hell-Cat Hetty) in a title role that had echoes of Eliza Doolittle in Shaw's Pygmalion, a role for which she might have been considered if she had not changed direction in 1912. In 1927 the Lord Chamberlain deemed it necessary to inspect the pyjamas she was wearing in the production of P. G. Wodehouse's Good Morning, Bill ("a tight-fitting, black lace, filmy affair"). After suitably close scrutiny the pyjamas were passed fit for public viewing. In 1930-31 she did a season in repertory at the Ambassadors Theatre, Southend. She toured in Canada in 1932, performing in Shaw's Too True to be Good and Robert E. Sherwood's The Queen's Husband. Throughout her career she received good reviews, with reviewers often praising her attractiveness as well as her acting skills.

== Film career ==
In 1913 Minto appeared as herself, modelling clothes in a short film called Kinemacolour Fashion Gazette. She played roles in a small number of feature films from 1916 onwards, including in several silent films directed by British director Kenelm Foss. The last of the firms she made with Foss was The Glad Eye (1920), an adaptation of a play by Paul Armont that she had acted in eight years previously. She played no film parts between 1922 and 1930 (approximately corresponding to the dates of her second marriage) when she acted in her first 'talkie', a musical comedy directed by Walter Summers called Raise the Roof. Her final film part was in Broken Blossoms (d. John Brahm, 1936) which was a remake of a D. W. Griffith classic.

== Personal life ==
In 1907 Dorothy Minto married the actor Shiel Barry, with whom she had appeared the previous year in the play Robin Hood. Barry was the son of one of the main actors in Dion Boucicault's company (he was also called Shiel Barry). "The wedding was known only to a few persons, and the bride and bridegroom continued to appear at their respective theatres without indulging in a honeymoon." In 1908 they had a daughter, Moira. By 1913, though, Minto was listed in the London phone book as living at the same address as the actor Morris Harvey, and in 1914 Barry (who was by then acting in the North of England, notably in the Liverpool Repertory Company) filed divorce proceedings citing Harvey as the co-respondent. However, these proceedings were withdrawn before Barry joined the armed forces to take part in the First World War: he was killed at the Somme in October 1916.

In 1921 Minto married Capt. Robert Geoffrey Buxton (formerly Heinekey), whose family had interests in the Malayan rubber industry. As with her first wedding, the groom's family knew nothing about the wedding until it had taken place. In June 1922 she had to postpone an extensive tour of the far east with her husband after an operation to remove her appendix. They had no children, and Buxton divorced her in 1928 on grounds of infidelity.

In 1930 she was fined for contempt of court after failing to appear at a hearing relating to non-payment of a tradesman's bill (the tradesman was an engineer in Steyning, Sussex, where her daughter was living). There is little record of her life after the mid-1930s. She died in Chelsea on 6 December 1957.

== Selected stage roles ==
ca. 1903/4

- Hamlet (Shakespeare) Second Gravedigger

1904

- The Power of Darkness (Leo Tolstoy) Nan

1905

- The First Franciscans (William Poel) Peasant Girl
- Romeo and Juliet (William Shakespeare) Juliet
- The Wild Duck (Henrik Ibsen) Hedwig Ekdal
- Major Barbara (George Bernard Shaw) Jenny Hill
- The Faithful Lover (William Poel) ?

1906

- The School for Husbands (Molière/Charles Macklin) Clarissa Huntleigh
- Prunella (or Love in a Dutch Garden) (Laurence Housman/Granville Barker) Prunella
- Olf and the Little Maid (M. E. Francis) Kitty
- Tribute to Ellen Terry (?) French court lady
- You Never Can Tell (George Bernard Shaw) Dolly Clandon
- Robin Hood (William Devereux & Henry Hamilton) Adela (Maid Marian's attendant)

1907

- The Philanderer (George Bernard Shaw) Sylvia Craven
- Votes For Women! (Elizabeth Robins) Ernestine Blunt
- The Return of the Prodigal (St. John Hankin) Stella Faringford
- Mr. Steinmann's Corner (Alfred Sutro) Nora
- David Ballard (Charles McEvoy) Mercy Hainton
- Joy (John Galsworthy) Joy

1908

- The Merchant of Venice (William Shakespeare) Nerissa
- The Dog Between (Laurence Irving) wife
- The Duke's Motto (Justin H. McCarthy) Flora
- Peter Pan (J.M. Barrie) Tootles

1910

- Old Friends (J.M. Barrie) Carry
- Chains (Elizabeth Baker) Sybil Frost
- Vision of Delight (Ben Jonson) ?
- Lysistrata (Aristophanes) Myrrhina
- Just To Get Married (Cicely Mary Hamilton) Daphne Grayle
- The Merciful Soul (Laurence Alma Tadema) Fiordelisa

1911

- An Episode (?) Bianca
- Fanny's First Play (George Bernard Shaw) Dora Delaney
- The First Actress (Christopher St. John) Mrs. Kitty Clive

1912

- The Grass Widows (Gustave Kerker) Betty Baker
- Where There's A Will (Bernard Parry) Dolly Graham
- Hullo, Rag-Time! (Louis Hirsch) ?

1913

- 8d-a-Mile, 8d-a-Mile (?) ?
- The Real Thing (Catherine Chisholm Cushing) Lulu

1914

- Things We'd Like to Know (Monckton Hoffe) Dorothy Gedge
- An Indian Summer (Mrs. Horlick) Ursula
- The Glad Eye (Paul Armont) Kiki

1915

- A Chinese Honeymoon (George Dance) Fifi
- Watch Your Step (Irving Berlin) Iona Ford

1916

- School For Scandal (Richard Brinsley Sheridan) ?
- More (?) ?
- Pell Mell (Morris Harvey/Nat Ayer/Fred Thompson) Typist, office boy, mother, etc.

1917

- Double Dutch (Laurence Cowen) Miena
- Wild Heather (Dorothy Brandon) Dolly Thompson
- The Admirable Crichton (J.M. Barrie) Gladys
- The Happy Family (Cecil Aldin) Melisande Stubbins

1918

- Nothing But The Truth (James Montgomery) Mabel Jackson

1920 (all with the Grand Guignol company)

- Husbands For All (Gertrude Jennings) Jemima
- G.H.Q. Love (Sewell Collins) Lily
- Oh! Hell!! (Reginald Arkell & Russell Thorndike) ?
- What Did her Husband Say? (H.F. Maltby) 'Her'
- A Man In Mary's Room (Gladys Unger) Victoria
- The Tragedy of Mr. Punch - a fantastic play in prologue and one act (Russell Thorndike) Polly

1921

- The Person Unknown (H.F. Maltby) Mary (with Guignol)
- A Christmas Carol (Russell Thorndike, from Dickens) Sarah Cratchit
- Nightie Night (Martha M. Stanley & Adelaide Matthews) Trixie Lorraine
- The Hotel Mouse (Guy Bolton; orig. play Marcel Gerbidon & Paul Armont) Mauricette

1922

- Nightie Night (Martha M. Stanley & Adelaide Matthews) Trixie Lorraine (revival of 1921 play)

1923 (both as 'actress-manageress')

- The Piccadilly Puritan (Gertie de S. Wentworth-James & Lechmere Worrall) Alice
- Eliza Comes To Stay (H.V. Esmond) Eliza

1924

- The Blue Peter (E. Temple Thurston) Rosie Callaghan

1925

- The Wishing Well (Grace Richardson) 'vulgar Cockney'

1926

- His Wild Oat (Sydney Blow & Douglas Hoare, orig. "Dis Que C'est Toi") Dou Dou Delville

1927

- Wild-Cat Hetty (aka Hell-Cat Hetty) (Florence Kilpatrick) Hetty
- Good Morning, Bill! (P.G. Wodehouse) Lottie

1928

- Who's Who? (Roland Daniel & Clifford Poultney) Zita Lorton
- Quest (Ralph Stock) Alice Bolton

1930

- The Double Man (Val Gielgud) ?
- Fourth Floor Heaven (Kathleen D. Hewitt) Stella Dallas
- Search (Ralph Stock & Terence de Marney) Charlotte

1931

- Two Deep (Sydney Blow) Rosemary
- Port Said (Emlyn Williams) Edith

1932

- Too True to be Good (George Bernard Shaw) ?

1933

- Vessels Departing (Emlyn Williams - adaptation of Port Said) Edith?

== Filmography ==
1916

- Bored (short, comedy, d. Harry Buss) The Girl

1918

- Once Upon a Time (romantic drama, d. Kenelm Foss) Lottie Price

1919

- A Little Bit of Fluff (comedy, d. Kenelm Foss) Mamie Scott
- I Will (comedy, d. Kenelm Foss) Mrs. Giles

1920

- The Glad Eye (comedy, d. Kenelm Foss, James Reardon) Kiki

1922

- The Game of Life (historical drama, d. G.B.Samuelson) Betsy Rudd

1930

- Raise the Roof (musical comedy, d. Walter Summers) Juanita
- Children of Chance (crime, d. Alexander Esway) Sally

1935

- Inside the Room (crime, d. Leslie S. Hiscott) Lilian Hope

1936

- Broken Blossoms (drama, d. John Brahm) Woman

== See also ==
A set of photographs of Dorothy Minto, taken between 1908 and the early 1920s mainly by the photographers Rita Martin and Bassano, is held at the National Portrait Gallery in London.

The London Victoria and Albert Museum holds two photographs of Esmé Percy and Dorothy Minto as Romeo and Juliet in 1905. See here and here.

The British Pathé Historical Archive has a short, silent video newsreel, dated 1929 and entitled 'After the Play is Over', which contains a brief clip of Dorothy Minto pretending to spoonfeed a 'mascot' (=doll) in a restaurant. See here.
