= Dan Chatterton =

English pamphleteer (1820–1895)

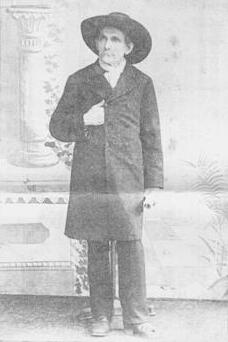
- Dan Chatterton
- Born: Daniel Chatterton; 25 August 1820; Clerkenwell, London, England
- Died: 7 July 1895 (aged 74); London, England

Daniel Chatterton (25 August 1820 – 7 July 1895) was a British political pamphleteer and propagandist and publisher of Chatterton's Commune, the Atheistic Communistic Scorcher.

== Biography ==
Chatterton was born in Clerkenwell in central London. His father was a practitioner of Japanning, a form of lacquerwork, but an accident left him unable to continue his craft. Chatterton suffered poor health when young and his attempts to establish himself as a bootmaker were unsuccessful. In the 1850s, at the time of the Crimean War he enlisted in the army, but appears to have spent much of his military service in a hospital in Malta. He subsequently earned what seems to have been a precarious living as a bill poster and a peddler of left-wing literature. Chatterton married twice – his first wife, Emma, died in St Pancras workhouse at the age of 32. He lived in slum housing in the Cromer Street area of King's Cross and later around Drury Lane in Covent Garden. He was buried in an unmarked grave in St Pancras cemetery in Finchley. Of his children, only one, Alfred, outlived him.

== Political activism ==
Chatterton said that he imbibed his atheism and freethought from his father. By his own account, he was 'badly injured' when police used violence to clear a Chartist protest on Clerkenwell Green in 1848. He appears to have been influenced by the ideas of the Chartist and socialist Bronterre O'Brien and was prominent in several of the small extreme radical groups which emerged in the early 1870s. At about this time, he published the first of his own pamphlets, in total producing at least twenty titles often incendiary in tone, denouncing the royal family, organised religion and government and urging workers to revolt. While the tone of Chatterton's writings was intemperate and angry, he also addressed issues which touched directly on the lives of the urban poor. He advocated birth control so that women could enjoy 'all the sexual pleasures of love, of life, of all desire' without giving birth to children they could not afford to feed. In another pamphlet, he expressed fierce criticism of slum clearances which left slum-dwellers homeless and argued that land and houses should be nationalised.

In 1884, Chatterton began publishing the 'Scorcher', which appeared roughly every three months - more than forty issues in all - for the rest of his life. It was often produced on cheap paper with irregular type and printed without a press. He was the only contributor. The full title, 'Chatterton's Commune, the Atheistic Communist Scorcher' reflected his interest in the Paris Commune of 1871 as a model of working class self-organisation and rebellion. He repeatedly denounced "kingcraft" and "priestcraft" and the various "shams and swindles" which he saw as perpetuating inequality and the misery of the urban poor. Chatterton has been described as 'a born contrarian' who was also 'an authentic voice, steeped in British and continental political demands, typical themselves of the result of Victorian non-conformity'.

Chatterton was a regular orator at outdoor speaking pitches and often spoke from the floor at religious and political meetings. His outlandish appearance and fierce polemics gained him a reputation - and a degree of affection - beyond the confined circles of left-wing activists. Although Chatterton did not describe himself as an anarchist, his highly individualist and insurrectionary style of propaganda gained the attention of anarchist activists who came to regard him as one of their own. 'Old Chat', as he sometimes styled himself, became known as a character of the London streets.

== In Literature ==
Several novelists based fictional characters on Chatterton, including Richard Whiteing in his 1899 best-seller No 5 John Street and also W. Pett Ridge and John Henry Mackay and perhaps George Gissing.

The pamphleteer Betterton in R.B. Cunninghame Graham's sketch, "An Idealist" (1906), is based on Dan Chatterton.
