= The Town of Crooked Ways =

1920 film

The Town of Crooked Ways is a 1920 British silent drama film directed by Bert Wynne and starring Edward O'Neill, Poppy Wyndham and Denis Cowles. It was based on a novel by J.S. Fletcher.

== Cast ==
- Edward O'Neill as Solomon Quamperdene
- Poppy Wyndham as Queenie Clay
- Denis Cowles as Bevis Coleman
- Cyril Percival as Clarence Quamperdene
- Eileen Magrath as Millie Earnshaw
- George Bellamy as James Winter
- Joan Ferry as Beatrice Quamperdene
- Bert Wynne as Winterton Loring
- Charles Vane as Alderman Tanqueray
- Arthur M. Cullin as Parson
- Arthur Walcott as Jack Ricketts
- Judd Green as Chancellor Slee
- Lyell Johnstone as Ben Claybourne
- Ida Fane as Miss Grampayne
- Wallace Bosco as Mallowes
- Fred Rains as Chyver
