= No. 5 John Street =

1921 film

- Directed by: Kenelm Foss
- Written by: Richard Whiteing (novel); Kenelm Foss
- Produced by: H.W. Thompson
- Starring: Zena Dare; Mary Odette; Lionelle Howard
- Cinematography: Frank Canham
- Edited by: John Miller
- Production company: Astra Films
- Distributed by: Astra Films
- Release date: December 1921
- Country: United Kingdom
- Languages: Silent; English intertitles

No. 5 John Street is a 1921 British silent drama film directed by Kenelm Foss and starring Zena Dare and Mary Odette and Lionelle Howard. It is based on the 1899 novel by Richard Whiteing. The screenplay concerns a soap-making heiress who disguises herself as a worker.

== Plot ==
A soap-making heiress disguises herself as a worker and gets employment at her own family's factory to find out about ordinary conditions. However she comes under threat from an anarchist.

== Cast ==
- Zena Dare as Tilda
- Mary Odette as Celia Ridler
- Lionelle Howard as Seaton Ridler
- Randle Ayrton as I. Azreal
- Roy Travers as Sir Charles Pounds
- Charles Danvers as Sir Marmaduke Ridler
- James McWilliams as Stubbs
- Peggy Bayfield as Nance

== Bibliography ==
- Low, Rachael. History of the British Film, 1918-1929. George Allen & Unwin, 1971.
