= George Leyton =

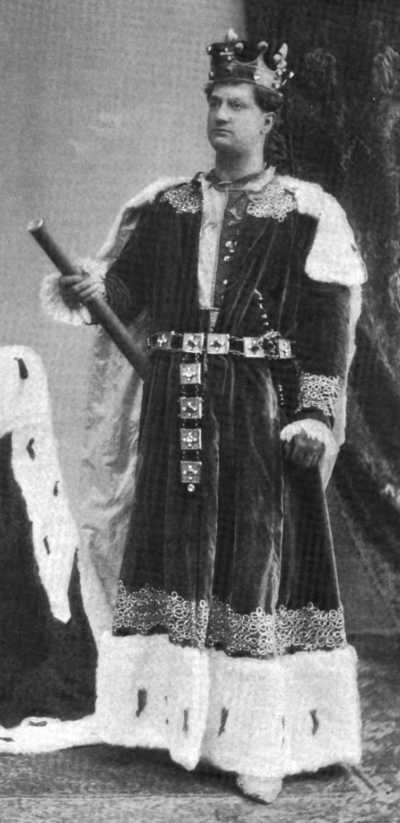
- As Henry V at Oxford Music Hall in 1895

Background information
- Birth name: Henry George Hackett
- Born: 28 April 1864; New Orleans, Louisiana, U.S.
- Died: 5 June 1948 (aged 84); London, England
- Genres: Music hall, films
- Occupation(s): Singer, songwriter, actor
- Years active: 1890s-1920s

George Leyton (born Henry George Hackett, 28 April 1864 – 5 June 1948) was a British singer, songwriter, and actor.

== Biography ==
He was born in New Orleans, Louisiana, to English parents, and returned with them to London, where he was baptised in 1866. He first appeared on stage at the Princess's Theatre in 1889, in the play True Heart, and the following year began appearing in venues such as the Royal Music Hall and the Oxford Music Hall. He quickly became associated with performing military and patriotic scenes, and in 1894 first performed his piece Waterloo.

He became a popular "descriptive and character vocalist" in music halls, performing songs and monologues, many of which he wrote. He toured around the country, and at each venue raised money for local veterans by selling copies of his popular songs, such as "Boys of the Chelsea School", "Forgotten", "The Best of Friends Must Part", and "All Hands on Deck", raising that way over £5,000 in total. He was an active member and supporter of the Legion of Frontiersmen, and started a fund for veterans of the Crimean War and the Indian Mutiny, raising some £3,600, for which he was thanked by King Edward VII. He also put on performances incorporating war veterans, and local recruits performing military drill, such as in Hanley in 1905, where 20 local boys performed the sketch "Britannia's Babes" on stage with him.

During the First World War he turned to the making of silent films. As an actor, he appeared in films including It's Never Too Late to Mend (1917); The Man Who Made Good (1917), for which he wrote the script; and Land of My Fathers (1921), directed by Fred Rains, which Leyton produced.

He died in London in 1948, aged 84.
