= Dicky Monteith =

1922 British film by Kenelm Foss

Dicky Monteith is a 1922 British silent drama film directed by Kenelm Foss and starring Stewart Rome, Joan Morgan and Jack Minister. Its plot involves a lawyer who tries to con a drunken client out of a large sum of money. It is an adaptation of a play by Tom Gallon and Leon M. Lion.

== Cast ==
- Stewart Rome as Dicky Monteith
- Joan Morgan as Sally/Dorothy Weston
- Jack Minister as Vincent Hepburn
- Douglas Munro as Mayor
- Nelson Ramsey as Barty
- Jack Frost as Ginger
- Gertrude Sterroll as Miss Tillotson
- David Hallett as Gilbert Collingwood
- James English as Sydney Carton
- Fay Segel as Lucy Manette
- A. B. Imeson as Charles Darnay
- Lewis Gilbert as Defarge
- Irene Tripod as Madame Defarge
- Kenelm Foss as Charles Dickens
