= The Polar Star =

- Directed by: Arrigo Bocchi
- Written by: Leslie Stiles
- Starring: Manora Thew; Hayford Hobbs; Peggy Patterson
- Production company: Windsor Films
- Distributed by: Walturdaw
- Release date: December 1919
- Country: United Kingdom
- Languages: Silent; English intertitles

The Polar Star is a 1919 British silent mystery film directed by Arrigo Bocchi and starring Manora Thew, Hayford Hobbs and Peggy Patterson. The screenplay concerns a London solicitor who is killed in mysterious circumstances in Italy.

It was made at Catford Studios and on location in Italy.

== Cast ==
- Manora Thew
- Hayford Hobbs
- Peggy Patterson
- Bert Wynne
- Charles Vane

== Bibliography ==
- Low, Rachael. History of the British Film, 1918–1929. George Allen & Unwin, 1971.
