= Cherry Ripe (film) =

1921 film

- Directed by: Kenelm Foss
- Written by: Helen Mathers (novel); Kenelm Foss
- Produced by: H.W. Thompson
- Starring: Mary Odette; Lionelle Howard; Roy Travers
- Cinematography: Frank Canham
- Edited by: John Miller
- Production company: Astra Films
- Distributed by: Astra Films
- Release date: August 1921
- Country: United Kingdom
- Languages: Silent; English intertitles

Cherry Ripe is a 1921 British silent romance film directed by Kenelm Foss and starring Mary Odette, Lionelle Howard and Roy Travers. The film is based on the 1878 novel of the same title by Helen Mathers which is itself named after the traditional song "Cherry Ripe".

== Cast ==
- Mary Odette as Mignon
- Lionelle Howard as Adam Montrose
- H.V. Tollemach as Christopher Codrington
- Roy Travers as Philip Lamert
- Peggy Bayfield as Muriel
- Gwen Williams as Miss Sorel
- Will Corrie as Silas Sorel
- Julie Kean as Puck
- Beatie Olna Travers as Prue

== Bibliography ==
- Low, Rachael. History of the British Film, 1918-1929. George Allen & Unwin, 1971.
