= The Slave (1918 film) =

- Directed by: Arrigo Bocchi
- Written by: Kenelm Foss
- Based on: The Slave; 1899 novel by Robert Hichens
- Starring: Jean-Marie de l'Isle; Hayford Hobbs; Charles Vane
- Production company: Windsor Films
- Release date: March 1918
- Country: United Kingdom
- Languages: Silent; English intertitles

The Slave is a 1918 British silent crime film directed by Arrigo Bocchi and starring Jean-Marie de l'Isle, Hayford Hobbs and Charles Vane. It was based on the 1899 novel of the same name by Robert Hichens.

== Cast ==
- Jean-Marie de l'Isle as Lady Carroll Knox
- Hayford Hobbs as Aubrey Herrick
- Charles Vane as Sir Reuben Allabruth
- Hettie Grossman as Diamond Manners
- Ernest Wallace
- Paul Courtenay

== Bibliography ==
- Goble, Alan. The Complete Index to Literary Sources in Film. Walter de Gruyter, 1999.
