= Cherry Ripe (novel) =

1878 novel by Ellen Buckingham Mathews

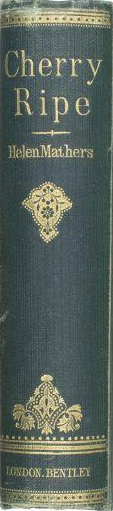
- Author: Ellen Buckingham Mathews
- Language: English
- Genre: Romance; Melodrama
- Publication date: 1878
- Publication place: United Kingdom
- Media type: Print

Cherry Ripe is a romance novel by the British writer Ellen Buckingham Mathews under her pen name of Helen Mathers, which was first published in 1878. Like much of her other work it is a sentimental rural romance, with shades of melodrama.

== Film adaptation ==
In 1921, the book was turned into a silent film Cherry Ripe directed by Kenelm Foss and starring Mary Odette.

== Bibliography ==
- Low, Rachael. History of the British Film, 1918-1929. George Allen & Unwin, 1971.
