= Not Guilty (1919 film) =

- Directed by: Arrigo Bocchi
- Written by: Kenelm Foss
- Starring: Kenelm Foss; Charles Vane; Hayford Hobbs
- Cinematography: Randal Terraneau
- Production company: Windsor Films
- Distributed by: Walturdaw
- Release date: March 1919
- Country: United Kingdom
- Languages: Silent; English intertitles

Not Guilty is a 1919 British silent comedy crime film directed by Arrigo Bocchi and starring Kenelm Foss, Charles Vane and Hayford Hobbs. The screenplay concerns a barrister who takes on his own case when he has to defend himself in court for tricking a millionaire out of money for a good cause.

== Cast ==
- Kenelm Foss as Sir Graham Carfax
- Charles Vane as Andrew McTaggart
- Hayford Hobbs as Donald McTaggart
- Olive Atkinson as Minnie Day
- Barbara Everest as Hetty Challis
- Bert Wynne as Tom Dent
- Evelyn Harding as Matron
- Philip Hewland as Dillingham

== Bibliography ==
- Low, Rachael. History of the British Film, 1918-1929. George Allen & Unwin, 1971.
