= Asthore =

1917 British silent film by Wilfred Noy

- Directed by: Wilfred Noy
- Written by: Kenelm Foss
- Production company: Clarendon
- Distributed by: Ideal Films
- Release date: June 1917
- Country: United Kingdom
- Languages: Silent; English intertitles

Asthore is a 1917 British silent film directed by Wilfred Noy.

== Cast ==
- Hayford Hobbs as Lord Frederick Armitage
- Violet Marriott as Elsa
