= Fred Morgan (actor) =

British actor (1878–1941)

Fred Lees Morgan (June 1878 – 11 May 1941) was a British actor of the silent era.

He was born in Islington, London, England, UK and died at age 62 in London.

== Selected filmography ==
- East Lynne (1913)
- The Harbour Lights (1914)
- The King's Romance (1914)
- Flying from Justice (1915)
- Disraeli (1916)
- The Grit of a Jew (1917)
- Fettered (1919)
- The Beetle (1919)
- The Land of Mystery (1920)
- The Pride of the Fancy (1920)
- The Breed of the Treshams (1920)
- Colonel Newcombe, the Perfect Gentleman (1920)
- Rodney Stone (1921)
- Safety First (1926)
