= Belphegor the Mountebank =

1921 British film by Bert Wynne

- Directed by: Bert Wynne
- Written by: Charles Webb (play); Adolphe d'Ennery (play); Marc Fournier (play); Eliot Stannard
- Starring: Milton Rosmer; Kathleen Vaughan; Warwick Ward
- Production company: Ideal Film Company
- Distributed by: Ideal Film Company
- Release date: 1921
- Running time: 6 reels/5500 feet
- Country: United Kingdom
- Languages: Silent film English intertitles

Belphegor the Mountebank is a 1921 British silent film directed by Bert Wynne and starring Milton Rosmer, Kathleen Vaughan and Warwick Ward. It is based on the play Belphegor, the mountebank : or, Woman's constancy from the 1850s by Charles Webb. Webb's own play was a translation and adaptation of Adolphe d'Ennery's and Marc Fournier's Paillasse.

== Plot ==
The plot centres on the character Belphegor, a nobleman by birth whose life circumstances change and who is forced to take up the life of a traveling showman.

== Cast ==
- Milton Rosmer as Belphegor
- Kathleen Vaughan as Pauline de Blangy
- Warwick Ward as Laverennes
- Nancy Price as Countess de Blangy
- Margaret Dean as Madeleine
- Peter Coleman as Fanfaronade
- Leal Douglas as Catherine
- R.Heaton Grey as Comte de Blangy
- A.Harding Steerman as Duc de Sarola
