= The Man and the Moment =

1929 film

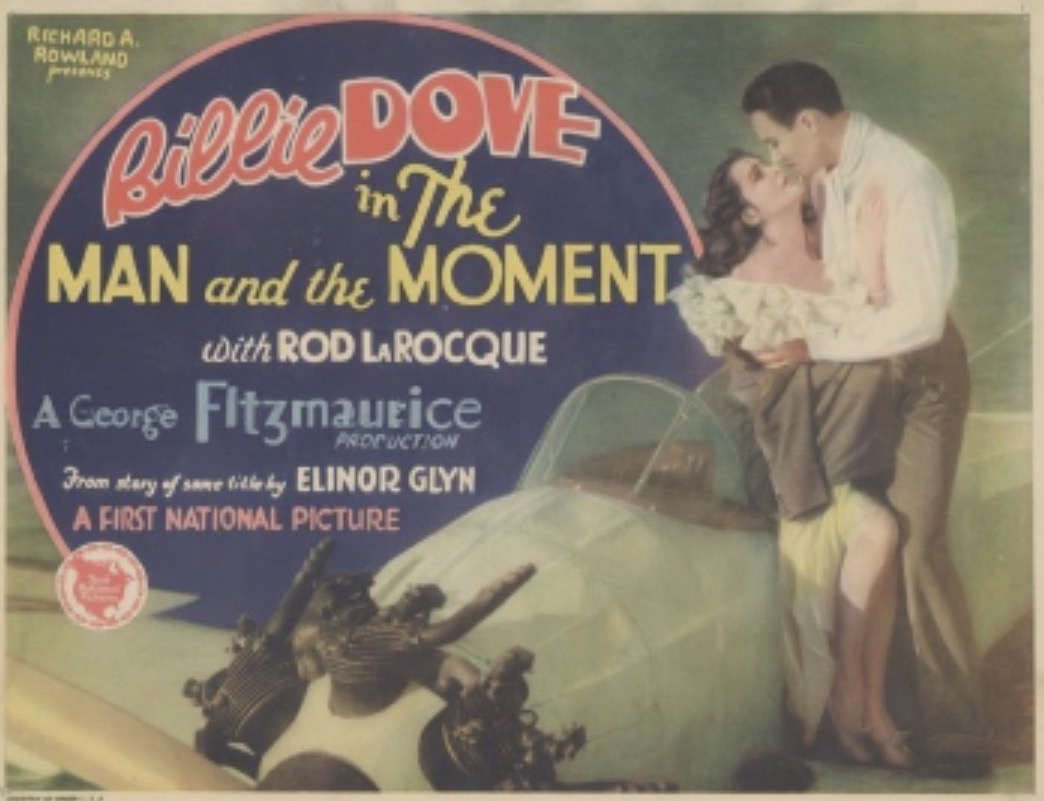
- Lobby Card
- Directed by: George Fitzmaurice
- Written by: Agnes Christine Johnston; Paul Perez
- Based on: story by Elinor Glyn
- Produced by: Richard A. Rowland
- Starring: Billie Dove
- Cinematography: Sol Polito
- Production companies: First National Pictures; The Vitaphone Corp.
- Distributed by: Warner Bros. Pictures, Inc.
- Release date: July 7, 1929
- Running time: 75 minutes
- Country: United States
- Languages: Sound (Part-Talkie); English Intertitles

The Man and the Moment is a 1929 American sound part-talkie romantic comedy film directed by George Fitzmaurice and starring Billie Dove. In addition to sequences with audible dialogue or talking sequences, the film features a synchronized musical score and sound effects along with English intertitles. The soundtrack was recorded using the Vitaphone sound-on-disc system.

The story is from a 1914 novel by Elinor Glyn, the famous novelist. The film was produced by Richard A. Rowland and released by First National Pictures. A British silent film adaptation of the same story was filmed in 1918.

== Plot ==
The Man and the Moment (1929; International Sound Version)

When Joan crash-lands her plane in the middle of Michel Towne's weekend yachting party, she finds herself rescued by the charming host. Her sudden arrival draws the ire of Viola Hatfield, Michel's possessive former lover, whose pending divorce has kept her from securing him for herself.

Back home, Joan receives a cold welcome from her stern guardian, who insists she pack up and return to the isolation of the Nebraska ranch where she has been largely hidden away from society. Learning that his accidental role in her troubles may send her back to exile, Michel visits Joan to comfort her.

Meanwhile, Viola sneaks into Michel's home through a private entrance and pressures him to promise marriage as soon as her divorce is finalized. Michel, realizing that marriage is Joan's only route to independence from her guardian, proposes a “convenient” marriage between himself and Joan—one in name only, followed by immediate separation. After hesitation, Joan agrees, on the condition that the marriage remains secret.

They marry aboard Michel's yacht, and he convinces her to stay for a private wedding supper. But Michel, now deeply in love with Joan, breaks his promise and forces his conjugal rights upon her.

Joan escapes at dawn by slipping through a porthole and swimming ashore. There, by chance, she encounters Skippy, Viola's ne’er-do-well brother. Joan tells her guardian the truth, but he still refuses to forgive her. With nowhere else to turn, she ends up staying at Viola's home—with Skippy.

Michel repeatedly tries to make amends, but Joan is unreceptive. To cover her heartbreak, she becomes a notorious socialite, partying constantly with Skippy. At one particularly scandalous gathering, Michel finally loses patience and forcibly carries Joan off to his home.

There, he sincerely pleads for forgiveness and presents her with her wedding gown, which he had saved. Joan, touched by his remorse, agrees to stay and wear the dress again.

Just as happiness seems within reach, Viola barges in—once again using the secret entrance—to announce that her divorce is now final. Joan, heartbroken by the intrusion, leaves.

She prepares to fly away alone, but Michel arrives just in time to board the plane. In a dramatic night flight over the ocean, the plane crashes. Believing they are about to die, Joan confesses her love for Michel and finally forgives him.

At dawn, Michel's yacht appears on the horizon to rescue them—Viola is aboard with her decree of divorce in hand, still intent on claiming Michel. “There’s nothing to prevent your being a witness,” Viola sneers at Joan.

“Nothing—except that I’m married to Michel myself,” Joan replies.

== Cast ==
- Billie Dove as Joan
- Rod La Rocque as Michel
- Gwen Lee as Viola
- Robert Schable as Skippy
- Charles Sellon as Joan's Guardian
- George Bunny as Butler

== Music ==
The film features a theme song entitled Just a Lucky Moment which was written by Ray Perkins. The song is played frequently as background music by the Vitaphone orchestra throughout the film and is sung off screen by an unnamed tenor. This song was also featured on the film's trailer.

== Preservation ==
The film was considered lost for decades until an complete print of the International Sound Version was discovered in an Italian archive and an restored version was screened July 4, 2015 at the Il cinema ritrovato festival in Bologna, Italy.

The sound of the domestic part-talkie version was synchronized to the surviving print of the international sound version. Because of this, many scenes feature intertitles shown immediately after the spoken dialogue conveying the same words. The talking sequences on the international sound version were muted with music and intertitles were inserted to convey the dialogue replaced in the appropriate foreign language. Therefore, intertitles were left in the talking sequences during the restoration to maintain synchronization with the Vitaphone soundtrack. It was given a DVD-R release by Warner Archive Collection in 2016.

The film was not included to the Associated Artists Productions' packages, as Warner Bros. retained it distribution rights.

== See also ==
- The Man and the Moment (1918)
- Mad Hour (1928)
- List of early sound feature films (1926–1929)
