= Colonel Newcombe, the Perfect Gentleman =

1920 British film by Fred Goodwins

Colonel Newcome
- Directed by: Fred Goodwins
- Written by: William Makepeace Thackeray (novel); William J. Elliott
- Starring: Milton Rosmer; Joyce Carey; Temple Bell; May Whitty
- Production company: Ideal Film Company
- Distributed by: Ideal Film Company
- Release date: 1920
- Country: United Kingdom
- Language: English

Colonel Newcome (or Colonel Newcome, the Perfect Gentleman) is a 1920 British silent historical drama film directed by Fred Goodwins and starring Milton Rosmer, Joyce Carey and Temple Bell. It was based on the 1854-55 novel The Newcomes by William Makepeace Thackeray.

== Cast ==
- Milton Rosmer as B. Newcombe
- Joyce Carey as Rose
- Temple Bell as Ethel Newcome
- Louis Willoughby as Newcombe
- May Whitty as Mrs. Mackenzie
- Fred Morgan as Baynham
- Haidee Wright as Lady Newcome
- Bobby Andrews as C. Newcombe
- Norma Whalley as Lady Clare
