= Castles in Spain (film) =

1920 British film by Horace Lisle Lucoque

- Directed by: Horace Lisle Lucoque
- Written by: Ruby M. Ayres (novel); Nellie E. Lucoque
- Produced by: Nellie E. Lucoque
- Starring: C. Aubrey Smith; Lilian Braithwaite; Bertie Gordon; Hayford Hobbs
- Cinematography: I. Roseman
- Production company: Lucoque
- Distributed by: Gaumont British Distributors
- Release date: June 1920
- Running time: 5,000 feet
- Country: United Kingdom
- Languages: Silent; English intertitles

Castles in Spain is a 1920 British silent drama film directed by Horace Lisle Lucoque and starring C. Aubrey Smith, Lilian Braithwaite and Hayford Hobbs. It was based on the 1912 novel Castles in Spain by Ruby M. Ayres. It was made at Kew Studios in London. A man retires to a country village, where he meets the woman of his dreams. However, he soon discovers that his nephew has also fallen in love with her.

== Cast ==
- C. Aubrey Smith as The builder
- Lilian Braithwaite as Elizabeth Cherry
- Bertie Gordon as Rachael
- Hayford Hobbs as Roger Welchman
- Maud Yates as Gwendolyn Welchman
- Charles Vane as The lame man
- R. Heaton Grey as George Henson
- Jeff Barlow as The lavender man
- May Lind as Diana Wynne

== Bibliography ==
- Bamford, Kentom. Distorted Images: British National Identity and Film in the 1920s. I.B. Tauris, 1999.
- Low, Rachael. History of the British Film, 1918-1929. George Allen & Unwin, 1971.
- Warren, Patricia. British Film Studios: An Illustrated History. Batsford, 2001.
