= A Little Bit of Fluff (play) =

Play written by Walter W. Ellis

Poster advertising the Criterion Theatre's suitability as an air raid shelter during WW I.

A Little Bit of Fluff is a British farce written by Walter W. Ellis which was first staged in 1915 and went on to have a long original run. Starring Ernest Thesiger, it ran at the Criterion Theatre, London, between 1915–1918, for a total of 1241 performances.

== Original production ==
The play opened at the Criterion Theatre on October 27, 1915, with the following cast:

- Ernest Thesiger as Bertrand Tully
- George Desmond as John Ayers
- Marjorie Maxwell as Pamela
- Ruby Miller as Maimie
- Stanley Lathbury as Trippett
- Alfred Drayton as Dr. Bigland
- Violet Gould as Ursula
- Lilian Talbot as Aunt Hannah
- Dulcie Greatwich as Chalmers

== Critical reception ==
Writing of the original production, The Annual Register described the play as "a really first-rate farce", and the performance of Ernest Thesiger (playing the comic hero), as "wonderful".

== Other productions ==
The play, with Stanley Lathbury from the London cast, opened on Broadway in August 1916 at the 39th Street Theatre, but closed after only 17 performances. It was revived in London at the Ambassadors Theatre in 1923, with Thesiger reprising his role as Tully; and at the Ambassadors once more, in 1943.

== Adaptations ==
The play was twice turned into films during the silent era. A 1919 film A Little Bit of Fluff, again with Thesiger, Stanley Lathbury and Alfred Drayton, directed by Kenelm Foss; and the 1928 film A Little Bit of Fluff which featured Betty Balfour, the most popular British actress of the day, and Sydney Chaplin, Charlie Chaplin's elder half-brother.

== Bibliography ==
- Low, Rachael. History of the British Film, 1918-1929. George Allen & Unwin, 1971.
