= The Homemaker =

- Directed by: George Dewhurst
- Written by: Donovan Bayley
- Produced by: George Dewhurst
- Starring: Manora Thew; Basil Gill; Gwynne Herbert
- Production company: Dewhurst Productions
- Distributed by: Dewhurst Productions
- Release date: January 1919
- Country: United Kingdom
- Languages: Silent; English intertitles

The Homemaker is a 1919 British silent romance film directed by George Dewhurst and starring Manora Thew, Basil Gill and Gwynne Herbert.

== Cast ==
- Manora Thew as Lysbeth
- Basil Gill as Wilbur Benson
- Gwynne Herbert as Lady Sturdy
- Peggy Patterson as Esther
- Jeff Barlow
- Lottie Blackford
- Nessie Blackford

== Bibliography ==
- Robert B. Connelly. The Silents: Silent Feature Films, 1910-36. December Press, 1998.
