= My Sweetheart =

- Directed by: Meyrick Milton
- Written by: Minnie Palmer (play); Kenelm Foss
- Starring: Concordia Merrel; Randle Ayrton; Bert Wynne; Marguerite Blanche
- Production company: Ideal Film Company
- Distributed by: Ideal Film Company
- Release date: 1918
- Country: United Kingdom
- Language: English

My Sweetheart is a 1918 British silent comedy film directed by Meyrick Milton and starring Concordia Merrel, Randle Ayrton and Bert Wynne. It was based on a play by Minnie Palmer.

== Cast ==
- Concordia Merrel - Mrs. Fleeter
- Randle Ayrton - Joe Shotwell
- Bert Wynne - Tony
- E.H. Kelly - Dudley Harcourt
- Marguerite Blanche - Tina Hatzell
