= Land of My Fathers (film) =

1921 film by Fred Rains

Land of My Father
- Directed by: Fred Rains
- Written by: Diana Torr
- Produced by: George Leyton
- Starring: John Stuart; Edith Pearson; Yvonne Thomas; Ernest Moore
- Production company: Glen Films
- Distributed by: Glen Films
- Release date: 1921
- Country: United Kingdom
- Language: English

Land of My Fathers is a 1921 British silent drama film directed by Fred Rains and starring John Stuart, Edith Pearson and Yvonne Thomas.

== Cast ==
- John Stuart - David Morgan
- Edith Pearson - Lady Gwenneth Beailah
- Yvonne Thomas - Dilwys Colwyn
- George Leyton - Lord Beaulah
- Florence Lynn - Mrs. Colwyn
- Ernest Moore - Owen Morgan
- Fred Rains - Bad Bill
- David Teriotdale - Agent
