= A Little Bit of Fluff (1928 film) =

1928 film

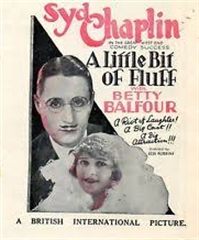
- Directed by: Wheeler Dryden; Jess Robbins
- Written by: Jess Robbins
- Based on: the stage farce A Little Bit of Fluff by Walter W. Ellis
- Starring: Sydney Chaplin; Betty Balfour; Edmund Breon; Clifford McLaglen
- Cinematography: René Guissart; George Pocknall
- Production company: British International Pictures
- Distributed by: Wardour Films (UK); Metro-Goldwyn-Mayer (US)
- Release dates: May 1928 (UK); 26 July 1928 (UK)
- Running time: 72 minutes
- Country: United Kingdom
- Languages: Silent film English intertitles

A Little Bit of Fluff (or Skirts in the U.S.), is a 1928 British silent comedy film directed by Wheeler Dryden and Jess Robbins and starring Sydney Chaplin, Betty Balfour and Edmund Breon.

== Synopsis ==
The misadventures of Tully (Chaplin), a young newly-wed man, and an exotic dancer (Balfour), the titular "little bit of fluff." Tully, an effete and completely mother-in-law-dominated new husband becomes unwittingly involved in boxer Hudson's plot to wrest his girlfriend's (Balfour's) $5000 necklace from her in order to pay his gambling debts. Living next door to Maggie, the exotic dancer, Tully is first introduced to her only because his mother-in-law demands that he go next door and make the noise cease—noise from one of Maggie's hedonist parties.

That evening, purely by coincidence, Tully accompanies his other neighbor, John Ayres, to the club at which Maggie performs as a singer/dancer (The Little Bit of Fluff), his wife and MIL having left town to visit aunty. It is at this club that Tully accidentally acquires the necklace and so, the rest of the farce is taken up with scenes of mistaken identities, moments of being in the wrong places at the wrong times, misunderstandings with wives, stepmothers, and boxer boyfriends, etc.

In the end, Hudson is arrested for trying to steal the necklace back from Tully's apartment and all falls back into order—except that Tully has NOT managed to lose his mother-in-law along the way. This film is highlighted by intricate gags, including using a pekinese puppy to moisten stamps, a fantastic spinning headstand by Chaplin, and, perhaps, marred a bit by a lack of plot and an unbearably long scene at the nightclub in which Chaplin mistakes a female "little person" for a little girl. This film definitely follows along well from the sort of character Chaplin created in his Warner Brothers contract—a winning one for him.

== Cast ==
- Sydney Chaplin as Bertram Tully
- Betty Balfour as Mamie Scott
- Edmund Breon as John Ayres
- Nancy Rigg as Violet Tully
- Clifford McLaglen as Henry Hudson
- Annie Esmond as Aunt Agatha
- Enid Stamp-Taylor as Susie West
- Cameron Carr as Fred Carter
- Haddon Mason as The Wasp
- John Thomas Hallas The Vicar
- Dorothy Bartlam as Bit role
- Harry McCoy

== Production ==
The film is based on the long running farce of the same title by Walter W. Ellis, which premiered at the Criterion Theatre, London, on 27 October 1915, featuring Ernest Thesiger as Bertram Tully.

This film version was predated by a 1919 film A Little Bit of Fluff directed by Kenelm Foss. In that adaptation, Thesiger reprised his role as Tully, as did Alfred Drayton (Dr. Bigland) and Stanley Lathbury (Nixon Trippett). This 1928 film features Syd Chaplin, the half-brother of both Charlie Chaplin and director Wheeler Dryden, as Tully. It was Chaplin's final film.
