= I Will (film) =

- Directed by: Kenelm Foss; Hubert Herrick
- Written by: Kenelm Foss
- Produced by: George Clarke
- Starring: Guy Newall; Ivy Duke; Dorothy Minto
- Production company: Lucky Cat Films
- Distributed by: Ideal Films
- Release date: July 1919
- Country: United Kingdom
- Languages: Silent; English intertitles

I Will is a 1919 British silent comedy film directed by Kenelm Foss and Hubert Herrick and starring Guy Newall, Ivy Duke and Dorothy Minto. In order to be able to marry a beautiful daughter of a socialist, a wealthy young aristocrat gains a job as a farmworker.

== Cast ==
- Guy Newall as Lord Eustace Dorsingham
- Ivy Duke as Ida Sturge
- Dorothy Minto as Mrs. Giles
- Cyril Raymond as Harris Giles
- Ronald Power as Bart Sturge
- Will Corrie as Kiffin
- Wallace Bosco as Sherlock Blake
- Percy Crawford as Boosey
- Lyell Johnstone as Professor Biggs
- Philip Hewland as Landlord

== Bibliography ==
- Low, Rachael. History of the British Film, 1918-1929. George Allen & Unwin, 1971.
