= The Toilers (1919 film) =

- Directed by: Tom Watts
- Written by: R. C. Sherriff; Eliot Stannard
- Based on: novel Toilers of the Sea by Victor Hugo
- Produced by: Neville Bruce
- Starring: Manora Thew; George Dewhurst; Gwynne Herbert; Ronald Colman
- Cinematography: E. G. Egrot
- Production company: Diamond Super Film Company
- Distributed by: Neville Bruce, Limited
- Release dates: March 1919 (UK); 27 March 1919 (US)
- Running time: 5 reels
- Country: United Kingdom
- Language: Silent

The Toilers is a 1919 British romantic drama film starring Ronald Colman as a young man who leaves behind his family and girl in a Cornish fishing village to seek his fortune in London. Two of five reels survive.

== Cast ==
- Manora Thew as Rose
- George Dewhurst as Jack
- Gwynne Herbert as Mother
- Ronald Colman as Bob
- Eric Barker as Jack (as a child)
- John Corrie as Lighthouse Keeper
- Mollie Terraine as Merchant's Daughter
