= Little Meg's Children =

1921 film

- Directed by: Bert Wynne
- Starring: Joan Griffith; Warwick Ward
- Release date: 1921
- Country: United Kingdom
- Languages: Silent; English intertitles

Little Meg's Children is a 1921 British silent film directed by Bert Wynne and starring Joan Griffith and Warwick Ward.

== Cast ==
- Joan Griffith
- Warwick Ward
- C. Hargrave Mansell
- Stella Nelson

== Bibliography ==
- Palmer, Scott. British Film Actors' Credits, 1895-1987. McFarland, 1988.
