= All Roads Lead to Calvary (film) =

1921 British silent film by Kenelm Foss

- Directed by: Kenelm Foss
- Written by: Jerome K. Jerome (novel); Kenelm Foss
- Produced by: H.W. Thompson
- Starring: Minna Grey; Bertram Burleigh; Mary Odette
- Cinematography: Jack Parker
- Production company: Astra Films
- Distributed by: Astra Films
- Release date: August 1921
- Country: United Kingdom
- Languages: Silent; English intertitles

All Roads Lead to Calvary is a 1921 British silent drama film directed by Kenelm Foss and starring Minna Grey, Bertram Burleigh and Mary Odette. It is partly based on the 1919 novel of the same name by Jerome K. Jerome. A fisherman becomes a Member of Parliament, but is torn between his career, mistress and wife.

== Cast ==
- Minna Grey as Nan Phillips
- Bertram Burleigh as Bob Phillips
- Mary Odette as Joan Allway
- Roy Travers as Preacher
- Julie Kean as Hilda Phillips
- J. Nelson Ramsay as Mr. Alway
- David Hallett as Arthur Allway
- George Travers as Editor
- Lorna Rathbone as Editor's Wife
- Kate Gurney as Landlady

== Bibliography ==
- Low, Rachael. History of the British Film, 1918–1929. George Allen & Unwin, 1971.
