= Warwick Ward =

English actor (1891–1967)

- Born: Warwick Manson Ward; 3 December 1891; St. Ives, Cornwall, England
- Died: 9 December 1967 (aged 76); London, England
- Occupations: Actor, film producer
- Years active: 1919–1958

Warwick Manson Ward (3 December 1891 – 9 December 1967) was an English actor of the stage and screen, and a film producer. He appeared in more than 60 films between 1919 and 1933. He also produced 19 films between 1931 and 1958. He was born in St. Ives, Cornwall.

Ward was a popular leading man in silent films of the 1920s, although he also played villains. Ward cultivated a debonair but forceful air in his films. Having made his breakthrough in British productions, he found his career impacted by a slum in 1924 that dramatically reduced the number of British films being made. Ward increasingly appeared in Continental productions, particularly German films. His career gradually tailed-off with the arrival of sound film and he began a second career as a film producer. He was an important figure at Associated British and appears in the studio's Elstree Story (1952).

== Filmography ==
=== Actor ===
- The Silver Lining (1919)
- Build Thy House (1920)
- Mary Latimer, Nun (1920)
- Wuthering Heights (1920)
- The Manchester Man (1920)
- The Call of the Road (1920)
- Handy Andy (1921)
- The Mayor of Casterbridge (1921)
- Corinthian Jack (1921)
- Little Meg's Children (1921)
- Demos (1921)
- The Golden Dawn (1921)
- The Diamond Necklace (1921)
- Belphegor the Mountebank (1921)
- Tell Your Children (1922)
- The Lilac Sunbonnet (1922)
- The Call of the East (1922)
- Bulldog Drummond (1922)
- Petticoat Loose (1922)
- The Hotel Mouse (1923)
- The Lady Owner (1923)
- The Great Turf Mystery (1924)
- The Prude's Fall (1924)
- Human Desires (1924)
- Southern Love (1924)
- The Money Habit (1924)
- Hurricane Hutch in Many Adventures (1924)
- Madame Sans-Gene (1925)
- Varieté (1925)
- The Wooing of Eve (1926)
- The Woman Tempted (1926)
- Lady Harrington (1926)
- The Famous Woman (1927)
- Eva and the Grasshopper (1927)
- The Bordellos of Algiers (1927)
- Looping the Loop (1928)
- The White Sheik (1928)
- Maria Marten (1928)
- Odette (1928)
- The Case of Prosecutor M (1928)
- La venenosa (1928)
- Eva and the Grasshopper (1928)
- The Most Beautiful Woman in Paris (1928)
- After the Verdict (1929)
- The Wonderful Lies of Nina Petrovna (1929)
- Her Dark Secret (1929)
- The Three Kings (1929)
- The Informer (1929)
- The Way of Lost Souls (1929)
- Birds of Prey (1930)
- L'enfant de l'amour (1930)
- The Yellow Mask (1930)
- To Oblige a Lady (1931)
- Number, Please (1931)
- Deadlock (1931)
- A Man of Mayfair (1931)
- Stamboul (1931)
- Life Goes On (1932)
- The Blind Spot (1932)
- The Call Box Mystery (1932)
- F.P.1 (1933)
- Kind, ich freu' mich auf Dein Kommen (1933)

=== Producer ===
- The Man at Six (1931)
- The Last Chance (1937)
- French Leave (1937)
- Saturday Night Revue (1937)
- Save a Little Sunshine (1938)
- Night Alone (1938)
- Almost a Honeymoon (1938)
- The Gables Mystery (1938)
- Me and My Pal (1939)
- Dead Men are Dangerous (1939)
- Suspected Person (1942)
- Women Aren't Angels (1943)
- Warn That Man (1943)
- The Man from Morocco (1945)
- Quiet Weekend (1946)
- My Brother Jonathan (1948)
- The Dancing Years (1950)
- Isn't Life Wonderful! (1953)
- The Young and the Guilty (1958)
