= The Shulamite (film) =

- Directed by: George Loane Tucker
- Written by: Edward Knoblock (play); Alice Askew; Claude Askew; Kenelm Foss
- Starring: Norman McKinnel; Manora Thew; Gerald Ames
- Production company: London Film Company
- Distributed by: Jury Films
- Release date: July 1915
- Country: United Kingdom
- Languages: Silent; English intertitles

The Shulamite, also known as The Folly of Desire, a 1915 British silent drama film directed by George Loane Tucker and starring Norman McKinnel, Manora Thew and Gerald Ames. It is based on the 1906 play of the same name by Edward Knoblock. Prints and/or fragments were found in the Dawson Film Find in 1978.

== Cast ==
- Norman McKinnel as Simeon Knollett
- Manora Thew as Deborah
- Gerald Ames as Robert Waring
- Mary Dibley as Joan Waring
- Gwynne Herbert as Mrs. Waring
- Minna Grey as Tanta Anna
- Bert Wynne as Jan Van Kennel
- Lewis Gilbert
- Beryl Mercer

== Bibliography ==
- Goble, Alan. The Complete Index to Literary Sources in Film. Walter de Gruyter, 1999.
