= Concordia Merrel =

English actress (1885–1962)

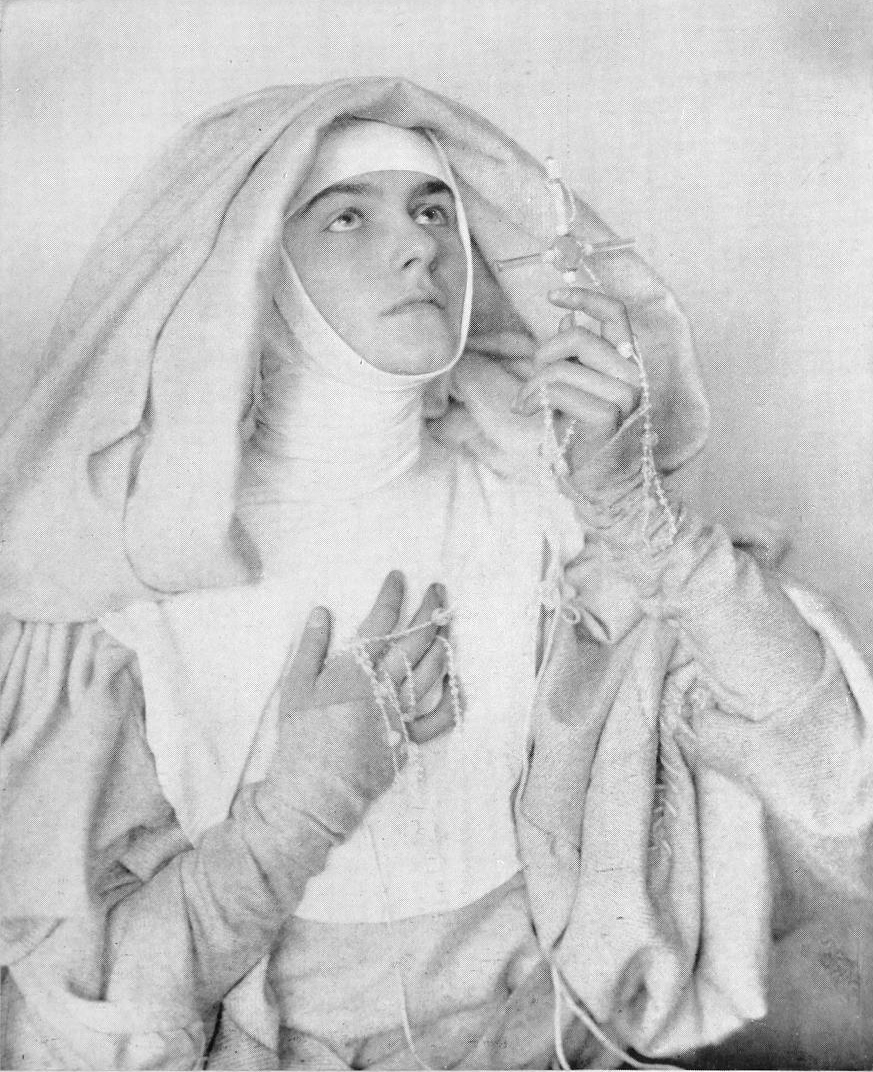
- Merrel as Isabella in Measure for Measure (1909)
- Born: Mary Phyllis Joan Logan; 10 September 1885; Visakhapatnam, Andhra Pradesh, India
- Died: 18 May 1962 (aged 76); Eye, Suffolk, England, U.K.
- Occupations: Actress; Model; Author
- Years active: 1909–1956
- Spouses: Franklin Dyall (m. 1907; div. 1929) Cavendish Morton (m. 1931; died 1939)
- Children: 3, including Valentine Dyall and Cavendish Morton

Concordia Merrel (born Mary Phyllis Joan Logan; 10 September 1885 – 18 May 1962) was a British stage and silent film actress, photographer's model and a prolific author of romantic fiction.

== Biography ==
She was born as Mary Phyllis Joan Logan in 1885 at Visakhapatnam, Andhra Pradesh in India, one of four children of Thomas Tweddle Logan (1855–1936), in 1880 the Principal of Bellary College in Madras and an Inspector of Schools in the Indian Educational Service, and Beatrice Maude née Pattenden (1860–1938). In 1891 Beatrice Logan was suffering ill-health and returned to England with her children while her husband remained in India. Her parents divorced in 1899 following her mother's adultery. On returning to England on furlough Thomas Logan went to his London house in 1892. On arrival he enquired of his man servant the whereabouts of Mrs Logan, to be told that she had moved out with the children and was living around the corner. He called at the address to be told that Mrs Logan was, in fact, living there with an unnamed man and her children. Thomas Logan then instigated divorce proceedings citing the man as co-respondent in his wife's adultery.

The divorce case caused him to overstay his furlough and this was logged in his service record. During his time in England he met Marian Hartley on an omnibus. On his next return to England they met again and decided to marry, which they did in Ceylon on the way back to India. They had a summer bungalow in Coonoor, Tamil Nadu, where daughters Sylvia and Gladys were born.

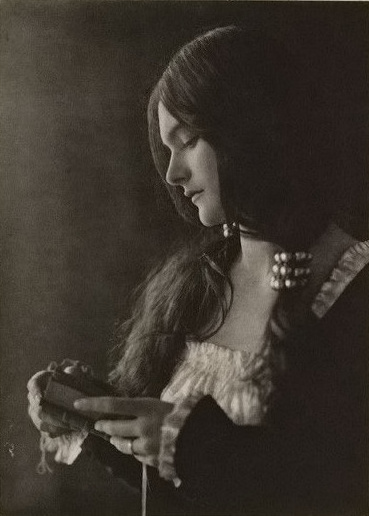
Concordia Merrel as Rosamond, 1909

Mary married the actor Franklin Dyall in 1907 and with him had a son, the actor Valentine Dyall (1908-1985), who went on to find fame as radio's 'The Man in Black'. She left Dyall in 1929 so he could marry the actress Mary Merrall. She began a relationship with the actor and photographer Cavendish Morton and married in 1935, giving birth to the twins Cavendish Morton and Concord Morton in 1911. After a period of nomadic wandering the family settled in Bembridge in the Isle of Wight where the couple home-schooled their sons with an emphasis on the arts.

In her youth, she was a photographer's model and in 1910 was the 'Kodak Girl' on a poster in a well-known advertising campaign for that company based on a photograph taken by Morton. In 1913 she played Mrs. Leighton in The Cormorant opposite her partner Cavendish Morton, and Giulia Verlaine in Greater Love Than This! at the Little Theatre in London. Her films roles included Pauline in A Smart Set (1919), Joan in The Lost Chord (1917), Margaret in Ave Maria (1918) and Mrs. Fleeter in My Sweetheart (1918).

Concordia Merrel and Cavendish Morton remained married until his death in 1939. She began writing romantic fiction in the 1920s, publishing her last novel in 1956. Her works were translated into four languages, with the last reprint occurring in 1999.

Concordia Merrel died in May 1962 in Eye, Suffolk in England. In her will, she left £739 6s to her sons Concord and Cavendish Morton.

== Select publications ==
- John Gresham's Girl, London : Hodder & Stoughton, [1926]
- Love's Hazard, London : Hodder & Stoughton, [1934]
- The Savage, London : Hodder & Stoughton, [1931]
- Two Men and Sally, London : Hodder & Stoughton, [1926]
- The Man without Mercy, London : Hodder & Stoughton, [1929]
- Julia takes her chance, London : Selwyn & Blount, [1920]
- The Miracle Merchant, London : Hodder & Stoughton, [1928]
- Sally among the Stars, London : Hodder & Stoughton, [1930]
- The Unconquerable Girl, London : Hodder & Stoughton, [1927]
- The Surprising Marriage, London : Hodder & Stoughton, (1932)
- The Fanshawe Family, London : Hodder & Stoughton, [1925]
- The Cads' Party, London : Hodder & Stoughton, [1931]
- The House of Yesterday, London : Hodder & Stoughton, [1932]
- Jacqueline and Love, London : Hodder & Stoughton, [1925]
- Love in Fetters, London : Hodder & Stoughton, [1925]
- The Shadow of Red Mason, London : Hodder & Stoughton, [1930)
- The Marriage of Anne, London : Hodder & Stoughton, [1927]
- Adam - and some Eves, London : Hodder & Stoughton, [1931]
- Introducing Terry Sloane, London : Hodder & Stoughton, [1933]
- His Lucky Star, London : Hodder & Stoughton, [1929]
- Heart's Journey, London : Hodder & Stoughton, [1924]
- The Girl with No Name, London : Hodder & Stoughton, [1925]
- Love Courageous, London : Selwyn & Blount, [1922]
- Storm Comes to Stay, London : Hodder & Stoughton, [1935]
- Love-and Diana, London : Hodder & Stoughton, [1926]
- Married for Money, London : Hodder & Stoughton, [1925]
- Ragged Robin, London : Hodder & Stoughton, [1925)
- The Seventh Miss Brown, London : Hodder & Stoughton, [1927]
- Consequences, London : Hodder & Stoughton, [1931]
- Ordeal by Marriage, London : Hodder & Stoughton, [1925]
- Les Deux fiancés de Lisbeth, [S.l.] : [s.n.], [1937]
- C'est toi que je cherchais - The Seventh Miss Brown, Adapté de l'anglais par Th. & E. de Saint-Segond, Paris; Édimbourg printed 1939
- In Pursuit of Happiness, [1956]
