= The Breed of the Treshams =

1920 British film by Kenelm Foss

- Directed by: Kenelm Foss
- Written by: Beulah Marie Dix (play); E.G. Sutherland (play) Kenelm Foss
- Produced by: H.W. Thompson
- Starring: Mary Odette; Hayford Hobbs; A. B. Imeson
- Cinematography: Frank Canham
- Production company: Astra Films
- Distributed by: Astra Films
- Release date: September 1920
- Country: United Kingdom
- Languages: Silent; English intertitles

The Breed of the Treshams is a 1920 British silent adventure film directed by Kenelm Foss and starring Mary Odette, Hayford Hobbs and A. B. Imeson. During the English Civil War, the Royalists uncover a Roundhead spy.

== Cast ==
- Mary Odette as Margaret Hungerford
- Hayford Hobbs as Hon. Francis Tresham
- A. B. Imeson as Hon. Clement Hungerford
- Charles Vane as Vis. Dorsington
- Margot Drake as Margaret
- Fred Morgan as Capt. Rashleigh
- Gordon Craig as Batty
- Will Corrie as Cpl. Lumsford
- Philip Hewland as Col. Henry Curwen
- Nelson Ramsey as Col. Bagshawe
- Norman Tharp as Capt. Stanhope
- Farmer Skein as Lord Tresham
- Gwen Williams as Mrs. Bagshawe
- C.R. Foster-Kemp as Child
- John Martin Harvey as Lt. Rat Reresby

== Bibliography ==
- Low, Rachael. History of the British Film, 1918-1929. George Allen & Unwin, 1971.
