= All Roads Lead to Calvary (novel) =

1919 novel by Jerome K. Jerome

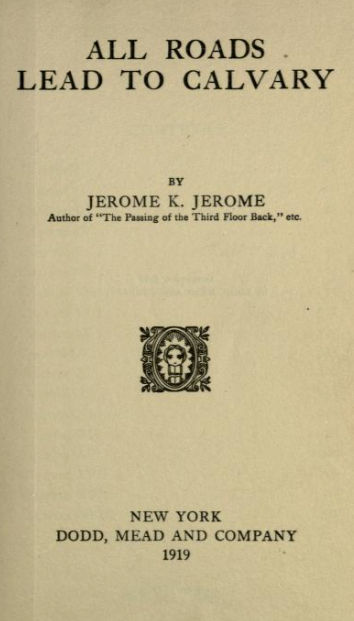
- Title page for All Roads Lead to Calvary (1919)
- Author: Jerome K. Jerome
- Language: English
- Genre: Drama
- Publication date: 1919
- Publication place: United Kingdom
- Media type: Print

All Roads Lead to Calvary is a 1919 novel by the British writer Jerome K. Jerome. It was one of the last works written by Jerome, better known for his Three Men in a Boat, and shows the influence of the First World War on him. It is a Bildungsroman in which a Cambridge University educated woman Joan Allway becomes a journalist and then a wartime ambulance driver. She encounters various different people, gaining new experiences and confronting many of the moral issues of the day.

== Film adaptation ==
In 1921 the novel was turned into a silent British film All Roads Lead to Calvary directed by Kenelm Foss.

== Bibliography ==
- Low, Rachael. History of the British Film, 1918-1929. George Allen & Unwin, 1971.
