= Cyril Raymond =

British actor (1899–1973)

Cyril Raymond's 1936 Spotlight photo

Cyril William North Raymond MBE (13 February 1899 – 20 March 1973) was a British character actor. He maintained a stage and screen career from his teens until his retirement, caused by ill health, in the 1960s.

His many stage, film and television roles include Fred Jesson, the husband of Celia Johnson's Laura Jesson in Brief Encounter (1945).

== Life and career ==
Raymond was the son of Herbert Linton Raymond and his second wife, Rose (née Knowles). Herbert died in 1906 at the Grand Hotel, Broad Street, Bristol, which he and his wife ran.

Raymond became a pupil at Sir Herbert Tree's Academy of Dramatic Art. He made his professional debut in 1914 at the Garrick Theatre, London, playing the Second Spanish Gentleman in Bluff King Hal.

As Little Billee in Trilby he supported Tree's Svengali at His Majesty's Theatre in 1915. While still a boy actor he appeared in plays by Louis N. Parker, Edward Knoblock and Harold Brighouse. In 1916, he played a major juvenile role, Lord Deerford, in Parker's Disraeli. The Observer reported that he "played very cleverly". A film was made of the play; he repeated his role of Deerford.

In 1922 Raymond married the actress Iris Hoey. (Note: The Times recorded on 18 September 1922: "Miss Iris Hoey, the actress, was married yesterday at a Bristol Register Office to Mr Cyril Raymond, of Bristol, an actor. Mr Raymond's mother, Rose L. Raymond, is the manageress of the Grand Hotel, Bristol.") They had one child, John Raymond, who became an author and critic. The couple co-starred in several West End plays in the 1920s; Raymond also worked extensively with the producer Basil Dean. He and Hoey divorced in 1936 and the following year he married the actress Gillian Lind.

In the view of Raymond's obituarist in The Times it was in the mid-1930s that "he found what might be called his vocation, in contributing balanced, controlled, humorous pieces of acting as foils to more flamboyant performances by highly accomplished leading ladies".

He co-starred as the spouse or partner of a range of leading ladies over the next twenty or so years, including Sybil Thorndike in Short Story (1935), Ruth Chatterton in The Constant Wife (1937 revival), Gertrude Lawrence in September Tide (1948), Edith Evans in Waters of the Moon (1953) and Yvonne Arnaud in Mrs Willie (1956).

During the Second World War Raymond served in the Royal Air Force from 1939 to 1945, and was awarded the MBE. In the cinema he appeared as Celia Johnson's character's husband in the 1945 film Brief Encounter. In The Observer, C. A. Lejeune praised "the sweetness, the sobriety, and the fresh delicacy" of his performance and those of Johnson and Trevor Howard.

On television, he appeared in the 1961 Danger Man episode entitled "Name, Date and Place" as Nash. http://danger-man.co.uk/episodeDetails.asp?episodeID=19&seriesNo=1

In the 1960s, Raymond appeared in plays by writers of the younger generation, including Nigel Dennis, Giles Cooper and John Osborne. In Osborne's Inadmissible Evidence in 1965 he appeared with Nicol Williamson and John Hurt. This was one of his last appearances, and ill health obliged him to retire several years before his death.

== Filmography (incomplete) ==
- The Hypocrites (1916) – Leonard Wilmore
- Disraeli (1916) – Lord Deeford
- I Will (1919) – Harris Giles
- His Last Defence (1919) – David Hislop
- The Scarlet Kiss (1920)
- Wuthering Heights (1920) – Hareton
- Sonia (1921) – Tom Dainton
- Single Life (1921) – John Henty
- Moth and Rust (1921) – Fred Black
- Cocaine (1922)
- The Faithful Heart (1922) – Albert Oughterson
- These Charming People (1931) – Miles Winter
- The Ghost Train (1931) – Richard Winthrop
- The Happy Ending (1931) – Anthony Fenwick
- A Man of Mayfair (1931) – Charles
- Condemned to Death (1932) – Jim Wrench
- The Frightened Lady (1932) – Sergeant Ferraby
- The Shadow (1933) – Jim Silverton
- The Lure (1933) – Paul Dane
- Strike It Rich (1933) – Slaughter
- The Man Outside (1933) – Captain Fordyce
- Mixed Doubles (1933) – Reggie Irving
- Home, Sweet Home (1933) – John Falkirk
- Keep It Quiet (1934) – Jack
- Royal Cavalcade (1935) – Undetermined Minor Role (uncredited)
- The Tunnel (1935) – Harriman
- It's Love Again (1936) – Montague
- Tomorrow We Live (1936) – George Warner
- Accused (1936) – Guy Henry
- Thunder in the City (1937) – James
- Dreaming Lips (1937) – PC
- Stardust (1938) – Jerry Sears
- Night Alone (1938) – Tommy
- The Spy in Black (1939) – The Rev. John Harris
- Goodbye, Mr. Chips (1939) – Teacher (uncredited)
- Come On George! (1939) – Jimmy Taylor
- Saloon Bar (1940) – Harry Small
- The First of the Few (1942) – Radio Control Officer (uncredited)
- Brief Encounter (1945) – Fred Jesson
- Men of Two Worlds (1946) – Education Officer
- This Was a Woman (1948) – Austin Penrose
- Quartet (1948) – Railway Passenger (segment "The Colonel's Lady")
- The Jack of Diamonds (1949, co-wrote screenplay with Nigel Patrick) – Roger Keen
- Angels One Five (1952) – Squadron Leader Barry Clinton
- Rough Shoot (1953) – Cartwright
- The Heart of the Matter (1953) – Carter (uncredited)
- The Gay Dog (1954) – Rev. Gowland
- The Crowded Day (1954) – Philip Stanton
- One Just Man (1954)
- Lease of Life (1954) – The Headmaster
- Charley Moon (1956) – Bill
- The Baby and the Battleship (1956) – P.M.O.
- The Safecracker (1958) – Inspector Frankham
- Dunkirk (1958) – General The Viscount Gort V.C.
- No Kidding (1960) – Col. Matthews
- Carry On Regardless (1961) – Army Officer
- Don't Talk to Strange Men (1962) – Mr. Painter
- Night Train to Paris (1964) – Insp. Fleming

== Selected stage credits ==
- Summertime by Louis N. Parker (1919)
- The Last Hour by Charles Bennett (1928)
- The Return of the Soldier by John Van Druten (1928)
- There's Always Juliet by John Van Druten (1931)
- Tony Draws a Horse by Lesley Storm (1939)
- Under the Counter by Arthur Macrae (1945)
- Happy with Either by Margaret Kennedy (1948)
- Towards Zero by Agatha Christie and Gerald Verner (1956)
- Aunt Edwina by William Douglas Home (1959)

== Notes, references and sources ==
=== Sources ===
- Gaye, Freda, ed. (1967). Who's Who in the Theatre (fourteenth ed.). London: Sir Isaac Pitman and Sons. OCLC 5997224.
- Goble, Alan (2011) [1999]. The Complete Index to Literary Sources in Film. Berlin and Boston: De Gruyter Saur. ISBN 978-3-11-095194-3.
