= The Broken Melody (1916 film) =

1916 British film by Cavendish Morton

- Directed by: Cavendish Morton
- Written by: Benedict James; Auguste van Biene
- Starring: John Martin Harvey; Hilda Moore; Manora Thew; Fred Rains
- Production company: Ideal Film Company
- Distributed by: Ideal Film Company
- Release date: 20 November 1916
- Running time: 5 reels
- Country: United Kingdom
- Language: English

The Broken Melody is a 1916 British silent romance film directed by Cavendish Morton and starring John Martin Harvey, Hilda Moore and Manora Thew. A woman leaves her husband, a Polish violinist, but returns to him after he is wounded fighting a duel.

== Cast ==
- John Martin Harvey - Paul
- Hilda Moore - Duchess
- Manora Thew - Mabel
- Courtice Pounds
- Barbara Hannay
- Fred Rains
- Nelson Ramsey
- Edward Sass
