= The Double Event (1921 film) =

1921 British film by Kenelm Foss

- Directed by: Kenelm Foss
- Written by: Kenelm Foss
- Produced by: H.W. Thompson
- Starring: Mary Odette; Roy Travers; Lionelle Howard
- Production company: Astra Films
- Distributed by: Astra Films
- Release date: July 1921
- Country: United Kingdom
- Languages: Silent; English intertitles

The Double Event is a 1921 British silent comedy film directed by Kenelm Foss and starring Mary Odette, Roy Travers and Lionelle Howard. After her father, a country clergyman, loses large sums of money his daughter recoups his losses by becoming the partner of a bookie.

The film is based on the play The Double Event, which was adapted into a sound film The Double Event in 1934.

== Cast ==
- Mary Odette as Dot Martingale
- Roy Travers as Captain Dennison
- Lionelle Howard as Charles Martingale
- Tom Coventry as Angus McNeil
- Roy Byford as James Bennington
- Beatie Olna Travers as Laura Bennington
- James McWilliams as Reverend Hubert Martingale
- Louie Freear as Susannah
- Sydney Wood as Dick Martingale
- Julie Kean as Harriet Martingale

== Bibliography ==
- Low, Rachael. History of the British Film, 1918-1929. George Allen & Unwin, 1971.
