= Trouble for Nothing =

1916 British silent film

- Directed by: Maurice Elvey
- Written by: Arthur Eckersley (play); Guy Newall (play)
- Starring: Guy Newall; Hayford Hobbs; Jeff Barlow
- Production company: London Films
- Distributed by: Jury Films
- Release date: August 1916
- Country: United Kingdom
- Languages: Silent; English intertitles

Trouble for Nothing is a 1916 British silent comedy film directed by Maurice Elvey and starring Guy Newall, Hayford Hobbs and Jeff Barlow.

== Cast ==
- Guy Newall as Rev. Cuthbert Cheese
- Hayford Hobbs
- Jeff Barlow
- Winifred Sadler

== Bibliography ==
- Murphy, Robert. Directors in British and Irish Cinema: A Reference Companion. British Film Institute, 2006.
