= A Royal Demand =

- Directed by: Gustav A. Mindzenti
- Written by: Jane Moorland
- Produced by: Jane Moorland
- Starring: Cyril McLaglen; Marjorie Hume; Fred Rains
- Cinematography: D.P. Cooper
- Production company: Moorland Productions
- Distributed by: Paramount Pictures
- Release date: August 1933
- Running time: 62 minutes
- Country: United Kingdom
- Language: English

A Royal Demand a 1933 British historical drama film directed by Gustav A. Mindzenti and starring Cyril McLaglen, Marjorie Hume and Fred Rains. It was made as a quota quickie for release by Paramount Pictures. It is set during the English Civil War.

== Cast ==
- Cyril McLaglen as Lord Forest (Southampton)
- Marjorie Hume as Lady Forest
- Fred Rains as Walters
- Vi Kaley as Nana
- Powell Edwards as General Orring
- Howard Fry as Lord Wentower
- Tich Hunter as Robin
- Gisela Leif Robinson as Lady Ann
- Cynthia Clifford

== Bibliography ==
- Low, Rachael. Filmmaking in 1930s Britain. George Allen & Unwin, 1985.
- Wood, Linda. British Films, 1927-1939. British Film Institute, 1986.
