= Bert Wynne =

British actor and film director (1889–1971)

Bert Wynne (15 November 1889, Battersea, London – 14 November 1971, Yeovil, Somerset) was a British actor and film director.

== Selected filmography ==
Director

- The Town of Crooked Ways (1920)
- The Manchester Man (1920)
- Little Meg's Children (1921)
- Jessica's First Prayer (1921)
- Handy Andy (1921)
- Belphegor the Mountebank (1921)
- The Call of the East (1922)

Actor

- The Heroine of Mons (1914)
- The Christian (1915)
- The Shulamite (1915)
- The Game of Liberty (1916)
- When Knights Were Bold (1916)
- The Manxman (1917)
- Justice (1917)
- Tom Jones (1917)
- God and the Man (1918)
- The Top Dog (1918)
- The Wages of Sin (1918)
- Peace, Perfect Peace (1918)
- My Sweetheart (1918)
- Fettered (1919)
- Not Guilty (1919)
- The Polar Star (1919)
- When It Was Dark (1919)
- Splendid Folly (1919)
