= Jeff Barlow =

British actor (1871–?)

- Born: 1871; Lancashire, England
- Occupation: Actor
- Years active: 1910s–1920s

Jeff Barlow (born 1871 in Lancashire, England) was a British film actor known for his character roles in early 20th-century cinema. Active primarily during the silent and early sound eras, he appeared in a variety of supporting parts that often drew on his distinctive appearance, including his bald head and round spectacles. Although details of his early life and career origins are scarce, Barlow maintained a steady presence in British film throughout the 1920s and 1930s. Information about his later life and death is not well documented in surviving published sources.

== Selected filmography ==
- Rupert of Hentzau (1915)
- The Man Who Bought London (1916)
- Trouble for Nothing (1916)
- Love's Old Sweet Song (1917)
- The Happy Warrior (1917)
- Bonnie Mary (1918)
- The Man and the Moment (1918)
- Once Upon a Time (1918)
- The Splendid Coward (1918)
- A Master of Men (1918)
- The Lackey and the Lady (1919)
- The Homemaker (1919)
- Castles in Spain (1920)
- Beyond the Dreams of Avarice (1920)
- The Glorious Adventure (1922)
- The Skipper's Wooing (1922)
- Was She Justified? (1922)
- The Lady Owner (1923)
- Hornet's Nest (1923)
- Chu-Chin-Chow (1923)
- Sen Yan's Devotion (1924)
- Satan's Sister (1925)
- The Marriage Business (1927)
