= The Diamond Man =

1924 British film by Arthur Rooke

The Diamond Man is a 1924 British crime film directed by Arthur Rooke and starring Arthur Wontner, Mary Odette and Reginald Fox. It was based on a novel by Edgar Wallace. The movie is silent and black and white. Distributed by Butcher's film service, script written by Eliot Stannard, and produced by I.B. Davidson Film Company.

== Cast ==
- Arthur Wontner - Lacy Marshalt
- Mary Odette - Audrey Torrington (Or Audrey Bedford)
- Reginald Fox - Dick Shannon
- Gertrude McCoy - Mrs. Marshalt
- Philip Hewland - Henry Torrington
- George Turner - Peter Tonger

== Plot ==
The Diamond Man is about an orphan who takes the blame for her sister's crime, and later reveals her boss as her evil husband.
