= Manora Thew =

English actress

Manora Alice Thew
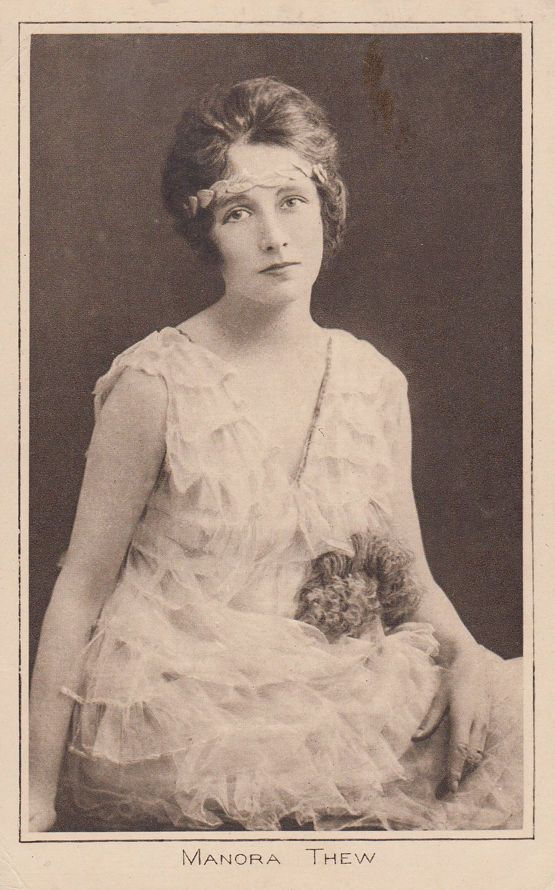
- Thew in 1916
- Born: 12 April 1891; Negapatam, Madras Presidency, British India
- Died: 12 April 1987 (aged 96); Marlow, Buckinghamshire, England
- Occupation: actress
- Years active: 1915-1922
- Spouse: John Davidson
- Children: Manora Joy Davidson
- Parents: Cuthbert Harrison Thew (father); Alice Maude Turner (mother)

Manora Alice Thew (12 April 1891 – 12 April 1987) was an English actress.

She was born in Negapatam, Madras Presidency, British India, the daughter of Alice Maude née Turner (1865–1925) and Cuthbert Harrison Thew (1859–1928). In 1911 she was a student at a boarding school in Frimley in Surrey. In 1915 she married John Davidson (1890–1954), a medical doctor, and with him had a daughter, Manora Joy Davidson (1920–1999). After the birth of her daughter she largely retired from acting. In 1939 she and her family were living at 140 Manchester Road in Sheffield.

Manora Thew died in Marlow, Buckinghamshire, England in 1987. In her will she left £116,050.

== Partial filmography ==
- The Shulamite (1915)
- Honour in Pawn (1916)
- Arsène Lupin (1916)
- The New Clown (1916)
- The Broken Melody (1916)
- His Daughter's Dilemma (1916)
- The Grit of a Jew (1917)
- Not Negotiable (1918)
- The Man and the Moment (1918)
- Once Upon a Time (1918)
- The Splendid Folly (1919)
- When It Was Dark (1919)
- The Polar Star (1919)
- The Homemaker (1919)
- Fettered (1919)
- The Toilers (1919)
- At the Villa Rose (1920)
- A Romance of Old Baghdad (1922)
