= Mad Hour =

1928 film

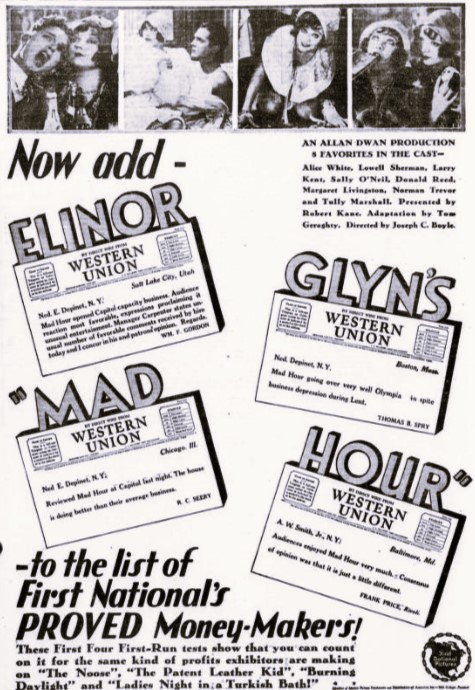
- Advertisement
- Directed by: Joseph Boyle
- Written by: Thomas J. Geraghty; Casey Robinson
- Based on: The Man and the Moment by Elinor Glyn
- Produced by: Robert Kane
- Starring: Sally O'Neil; Alice White; Donald Reed
- Edited by: Terry O. Morse
- Production company: First National Pictures
- Distributed by: First National Pictures
- Release date: March 4, 1928
- Running time: 70 minutes
- Country: United States
- Language: Silent (English intertitles)

Mad Hour is a 1928 American silent drama film directed by Joseph Boyle and starring Sally O'Neil, Alice White, and Donald Reed. It was adapted from a 1914 novel by Elinor Glyn.

== Cast ==
- Sally O'Neil as Cuddles
- Alice White as Aimee
- Donald Reed as Jack Hemingway Jr.
- Larry Kent as Elmer Grubb
- Lowell Sherman as Joe Mack
- Norman Trevor as Hemingway Sr.
- Eddie Clayton as Red
- Jim Farley as Inspector
- Rose Dione as Modiste
- Tully Marshall as Lawyer
- Margaret Livingston as Maid
- Jack Egan as Chauffeur
- Kate Price as Jail Matron
- Mary Foy as Police Matron
- Ione Holmes as Bride

== Censorship ==
Like many American films of the time, Mad Hour was subject to cuts by city and state film censorship boards. In Kansas the film, with a plot involving drinking, crime, and suicide, was banned by the Board of Review.

== Preservation ==
With no prints of Mad Hour located in any film archives, it is a lost film.

== See also ==
- The Man and the Moment (1918)
- The Man and the Moment (1929)

== Bibliography ==
- Goble, Alan. The Complete Index to Literary Sources in Film. Walter de Gruyter, 1999.
