= Sen Yan's Devotion =

1924 film

- Directed by: A.E. Coleby
- Written by: A.E. Coleby
- Starring: Sessue Hayakawa; Tsuru Aoki; Fred Raynham; Jeff Barlow; Tom Coventry
- Production company: Stoll Picture Productions
- Distributed by: Stoll Picture Productions
- Release date: July 1924 (UK)
- Running time: 60 minutes

Sen Yan's Devotion is a 1924 British drama film directed and written by A.E. Coleby. Sessue Hayakawa, Tsuru Aoki, Fred Raynham, Jeff Barlow and Tom Coventry featured in the film.

== Plot ==
A servant of a Japanese prince works to get back important papers of the line of succession.

== Cast ==
- Sessue Hayakawa as Sen Yan
- Tsuru Aoki as Sen Yan's wife
- Fred Raynham as Lutan Singh
- Jeff Barlow as Prince Huo Sang
- Fred Raynham as Lutan Singh
- Tom Coventry as Li Chang
- Johnny Butt as O Ming
- Henry Nicholls-Bates as Wung Li
