= Once Upon a Time (1918 film) =

- Directed by: Thomas Bentley
- Written by: Kenelm Foss
- Starring: Lauri de Frece; Manora Thew; Dorothy Minto
- Production company: British Actors Film Company
- Distributed by: Stoll Pictures
- Release date: May 1918
- Country: United Kingdom
- Language: English

Once Upon a Time is a 1918 British silent romance film directed by Thomas Bentley and starring Lauri de Frece, Manora Thew and Dorothy Minto. The screenplay concerns a love affair that develops between a comedian and a clown's daughter.

== Premise ==
Over the years a love affair slowly develops between a comedian and a clown's daughter.

== Cast ==
- Lauri de Frece as Sam Dunn
- Manora Thew as Sally Drury
- Dorothy Minto as Lottie Price
- Nelson Keys as Harry Gwynne
- Joan Legge as Mary Gwynne
- A. E. Matthews as Guy Travers
- Noel Fisher as Eustace Travers
- Frederick Volpe as Mr. Goodheart
- Charles Macdona as Dr. Brown
- Adelaide Grace as Mrs. Gwynne
- Jeff Barlow as Ned Drury
- Kenelm Foss as Charles Dickens

== Bibliography ==
- Low, Rachael. History of the British Film, 1914-1918. Routledge, 2005.
