= Emerald of the East =

1929 film

- Directed by: Jean de Kuharski
- Written by: Jerbanu Kothawala (novel); Lothar Knud Frederik; Jean de Kuharski
- Starring: Joshua Kean; Mary Odette; Lya Delvelez; Gillian Dean
- Cinematography: George Pocknall; Joe Rive
- Music by: Ed May
- Production companies: British International Pictures; British Pacific
- Distributed by: Wardour Films
- Release date: January 1929
- Running time: 5,600 feet
- Country: United Kingdom
- Language: English

Emerald of the East is a 1929 British adventure film directed by and featuring Jean de Kuharski. It also starred Joshua Kean, Mary Odette and Lya Delvelez. It was based on a novel by Jerbanu Kothawala. It was one of a growing number of British films to be set in India during the era.

== Plot ==
In India, British troops attempt to rescue the kidnapped son of a Maharaja.

== Cast ==
- Joshua Kean as Lt. Desmond Armstrong
- Mary Odette as Nellum
- Jean de Kuharski as Maharajah Rujani
- Lya Delvelez as The Maharanee
- Gillian Dean as Evelyn Gordon
- Maria Forescu as The Chieftainess
- Kenneth Rive as Maharaj Kumar
- Promotha Bose as Vaghi

== Bibliography ==
- Lahiri, Shompa. Indians in Britain: Anglo-Indian encounters, race and identity, 1880-1930. Frank Casss, 2000.
- Low, Rachel. The History of British Film: Volume IV, 1918–1929. Routledge, 1997.
