= Disraeli (1916 film) =

1916 British film by Charles Calvert and Percy Nash

- Directed by: Charles Calvert; Percy Nash
- Written by: Louis N. Parker (play and screenplay)
- Produced by: Arrigo Bocchi
- Starring: Dennis Eadie; Mary Jerrold; Cyril Raymond
- Production company: NB Films
- Distributed by: NB Films
- Release date: November 1916
- Running time: 6 reels
- Country: United Kingdom
- Language: English

Disraeli is a 1916 British silent biographical film directed by Charles Calvert and Percy Nash and starring Dennis Eadie, Mary Jerrold and Cyril Raymond. The film was based on the 1911 play Disraeli by Louis N. Parker, which was adapted twice more, as a 1921 silent version and most famously in 1929, as an early sound film. It was made at Ealing Studios.

When actor George Arliss who had made his name appearing in the play, wanted to make the 1921 version in America he acquired the rights from producer Arrigo Bocchi and oversaw the destruction of all copies of the original film.

== Synopsis ==
The mid-Victorian statesman Benjamin Disraeli manages to thwart the plans of Britain's rival Great Powers and gain control of the strategically important Suez Canal.

== Cast ==
- Dennis Eadie as Benjamin Disraeli
- Mary Jerrold as Lady Beaconsfield
- Cyril Raymond as Lord Deeford
- Dorothy Bellew as Clarissa
- Fred Morgan as Nigel Foljambe
- Daisy Cordell as Mrs. Travers
- Cecil Morton York as Duke of Glastonbury
- Evelyn Harding as Duchess of Glastonbury
- Arthur M. Cullin as Sir Michael Probert
- A. B. Imeson as Meyers
- Mrs. Henry Lytton as Queen Victoria

== Bibliography ==
- Fells, Robert M. George Arliss: The Man Who Played God . Scarecrow Press, 2004.
- Low, Rachael. History of the British Film, 1914-1918. Routledge, 2005.
