= Charles Vane (actor) =

British actor (1860–1943)

- Born: 2 January 1860; Kingston upon Thames, Surrey England; United Kingdom
- Died: 14 April 1943 (age 83); Polzeath, Cornwall, England; United Kingdom
- Occupation: Actor
- Years active: 1912–1927 (film)

Charles Vane (born William George Yarrow; 2 January 1860 – 14 April 1943) was a British stage and film actor. Vane appeared in more than fifty films during the silent era including the lead in When It Was Dark (1919).

== Selected filmography ==
- Kent, the Fighting Man (1916)
- A Bunch of Violets (1916)
- Sowing the Wind (1916)
- The Grand Babylon Hotel (1916)
- The House of Fortescue (1916)
- Boys of the Old Brigade (1916)
- The Top Dog (1918)
- The Wages of Sin (1918)
- The Man and the Moment (1918)
- Peace, Perfect Peace (1918)
- The Slave (1918)
- Whosoever Shall Offend (1919)
- The Irresistible Flapper (1919)
- Not Guilty (1919)
- When It Was Dark (1919)
- The Polar Star (1919)
- Fettered (1919)
- Splendid Folly (1919)
- The Lyons Mail (1919)
- Castles in Spain (1920)
- The Breed of the Treshams (1920)
- The Channings (1920)
- Calvary (1920)
- The Way of the World (1920)
- The Town of Crooked Ways (1920)
- Stella (1921)
- The Golden Dawn (1921)
- Mist in the Valley (1923)

== Bibliography ==
- Low, Rachael. History of the British Film, 1918–1929. George Allen & Unwin, 1971.
