= A. B. Imeson =

English stage and film actor (1875–1944)

- Born: John Arthur Bangley Imeson; 1875; Middlesbrough Rural District, North Riding of Yorkshire, England, UK
- Died: 28 February 1944 (aged 68–69); Epsom, Surrey, England, UK
- Occupation: Actor

A. B. Imeson (1875 – 28 February 1944) was an English stage and film actor.

== Filmography ==
His first role was playing Satan in the silent film The Picture of Dorian Gray (1916).

- Disraeli (1916)
- Ave Maria (1918)
- The Breed of the Treshams (1920)
- The Harbour Lights (1923)
- Out to Win (1923)
- The Monkey's Paw (1923)
- Bonnie Prince Charlie (1923)
- The Virgin Queen (1923)
- I Will Repay (1923)
- The White Shadow (1923)
- What the Butler Saw (1924)
- The Notorious Mrs. Carrick (1924)
- Second to None (1927)
- False Colours (1927) dramatic short film, with Ursula Jeans, directed by Miles Mander in the sound-on-film Phonofilm process
- Spangles (1928)
- The Burgomaster of Stilemonde (1929)
- After the Verdict (1929)

== Portrait ==
The National Portrait Gallery in London holds a portrait of Imeson by Alexander Bassano.
