= A Little Bit of Fluff (1919 film) =

- Poster ad in The Era, April, 1919
- Directed by: Kenelm Foss; Geoffrey H. Malins
- Written by: Walter W. Ellis (play); Kenelm Foss
- Produced by: Jack Clair; Leonide Zarine
- Starring: Ernest Thesiger; Dorothy Minto; Bertie Wright
- Cinematography: Lucien Egrot
- Production company: Kew Films
- Distributed by: Ruffells Pictures
- Release date: May 1919
- Country: United Kingdom
- Languages: Silent; English intertitles

A Little Bit of Fluff is a 1919 British silent comedy film directed by Kenelm Foss and Geoffrey H. Malins and starring Ernest Thesiger, Dorothy Minto and Bertie Wright. The film is an adaptation of the popular stage farce of the same name by Walter W. Ellis. Ernest Thesiger reprised his stage success as Bertram Tully, as did Alfred Drayton (Dr. Bigland) and Stanley Lathbury (Nixon Trippet). The play was filmed again in 1928. The 1919 version was made at the Kew Bridge Studios in London.

== Cast ==
- Ernest Thesiger as Bertram Tully
- Dorothy Minto as Mamie Scott
- Bertie Wright as John Ayers
- Kitty Barlow as Pamela Ayers
- James Lindsay as Aunt Agnes
- Alfred Drayton as Dr. Bigland
- Stanley Lathbury as Nixon Tippett

== Critical reception ==
Amongst contemporary reviews, The Derbyshire Advertiser noted "a riot of extraordinary and mirth-provoking scenes, and during its projection large audiences were continually laughing in the hearty manner that tells of real appreciation and enjoyment. Ernest Thesiger, as Bertram Tully, was the outstanding character of the film, and his facial expressions were truly wonderful achievements”; while Cinema Chat wrote, "It’s a perfect scream from start to finish, and the acting in several of the ludicrous scenes is clever - that’s the very word for it. We believe that this is Ernest Thesiger’s first appearance in the movies.”

== Bibliography ==
- Low, Rachael. History of the British Film, 1918-1929. George Allen & Unwin, 1971.
