= Hayford Hobbs =

British actor (1890–1957)

Hayford Hobbs (25 August 1890 – 10 January 1957) was a leading British film actor of the silent era and later became a film director. He was born in London, England, in 1891. He made his first screen appearance in the 1915 film The Third Generation and appeared in his last film High Treason in 1929. The following year he directed his first film, a documentary about London.

== Filmography ==
- The Firm of Girdlestone (1915)
- 1914 (1915)
- The Sons of Satan (1915)
- The Heart of a Child (1915)
- The Third Generation (1915)
- A Man of His Word (1915)
- The Heart of Sister Ann (1915)
- When Knights Were Bold (1916)
- The Man in Motley (1916)
- The Hypocrites (1916)
- The Princess of Happy Chance (1916)
- Trouble for Nothing (1916)
- The King's Daughter (1916)
- The Grit of a Jew (1917)
- Asthore (1917)
- Love's Old Sweet Song (1917)
- Justice (1917)
- The Gay Lord Quex (1917)
- Dombey and Son (1917)
- The Wages of Sin (1918)
- Hindle Wakes (1918)
- The Top Dog (1918)
- The Slave (1918)
- The Rugged Path (1918)
- The Man and the Moment (1918)
- Peace, Perfect Peace (1918)
- Victory and Peace (1918)
- The Polar Star (1919)
- Whosoever Shall Offend (1919)
- When It Was Dark (1919)
- The Romance of Old Bill (1919)
- Splendid Folly (1919)
- Not Guilty (1919)
- Fettered (1919)
- Unmarried (1920)
- The Manchester Man (1920)
- The Glad Eye (1920)
- The Breed of the Treshams (1920)
- The Ever Open Door (1920)
- A Bachelor Husband (1920)
- Castles in Spain (1920)
- In the Night (1922)
- A Rough Passage (1922)
- The Strangers' Banquet (1922)
- The Prisoner (1923)
- Bucking the Barrier (1923)
- Her Dangerous Path (1923)
- Flames of Desire (1924)
- That Man Jack! (1925)
- Wasted Lives (1925)
- The Midnight Limited (1926)
- The Flag Lieutenant (1926)
- The Luck of the Navy (1927)
- Toni (1928)
- The Ringer (1928)
- Smashing Through (1929)
- The Devil's Maze (1929)
- High Treason (1929)
- The Third Eye (1929)
