= Cavendish Morton (artist) =

British painter and illustrator (1911–2015)

Cavendish Morton (17 February 1911 – 30 January 2015) was a British painter and illustrator, a member of the Norwich Twenty Group. A painter in oils and watercolour, he concentrated on marine scenes and landscapes. He exhibited at the Royal Academy and was a member of both the Royal Institute of Painters in Oil and Royal Institute of Painters in Watercolours.

== Biography ==
Morton was born in Edinburgh, with twin brother Concord Morton (1911-1979), to the actor, art director and photographer Cavendish Morton (1874–1939) and Mary Phyllis Joan Logan, who acted and wrote romantic fiction under the name Concordia Merrel. The boys were brought up in Thornton Heath, Surrey.. The family settled at Bembridge, on the Isle of Wight, where the two boys were home-schooled, with an emphasis on the arts.

During the Second World War Cavendish worked in the aircraft industry. In 1946 he married the musician Margaret Rosemary Elisabeth Britten (1919-2000) on the Isle of Wight. They moved to Suffolk and he taught at Old Hall School, Hethersett in Norfolk, between 1957 and 1967. They later lived at Eye in Suffolk where Morton was art therapist at Hartismere Hospital. He twice became Eye town mayor.

He made a series of art programmes for children, for Anglia Television, in the 1960s and also illustrated books by Dorothy Hammond Innes (1906-1989). He also designed the bodies of various cars, some of which raced at Le Mans. He was a member of the Norfolk & Norwich Art Circle between 1951 and 1967 and became a member of the Norwich Twenty Group and the Norfolk Contemporary Art Society. In 1963 he became chairman of the Gainsborough's House Society in Sudbury and helped ensure that it remained an independent museum and art gallery. Morton was a member of the Ipswich Art Club from 1950 and exhibited at the club's 1974 centenary exhibition. He was exhibited widely in London and throughout East Anglia, with an annual exhibition at the Aldeburgh Festival.

His wife died in 2000 and Morton died on 30 January 2015, being survived by their son and two daughters.

In July 2012, the book Conversations with Cavendish Morton, about the artist, was published by Bella Janson.

Concord and Cavendish produced a number of artworks together.
