= The Grit of a Jew =

1917 film

- Directed by: Maurice Elvey
- Written by: Kenelm Foss
- Produced by: F.W. Baker
- Starring: Augustus Yorke; Manora Thew; Fred Groves
- Production company: Butcher's Film Service
- Distributed by: Butcher's Film Service
- Release date: May 1917
- Country: United Kingdom
- Languages: Silent; English intertitles

The Grit of a Jew is a 1917 British silent drama film directed by Maurice Elvey and starring Augustus Yorke, Manora Thew and Fred Groves.

== Cast ==
- Augustus Yorke as Moses Levi
- Manora Thew as Leah
- Fred Groves as Russell
- Marguerite Blanche as Elsie Maudsley
- Hayford Hobbs as Ben Levi
- Rachel de Solla as Mrs. Levi
- Cecil Mannering
- Frank Stanmore
- Fred Morgan
- Will Asher
- Inez Bensusan

== Bibliography ==
- Murphy, Robert. Directors in British and Irish Cinema: A Reference Companion. British Film Institute, 2006.
