= Cavendish Morton (actor) =

British actor, photographer and art director (1874–1939)

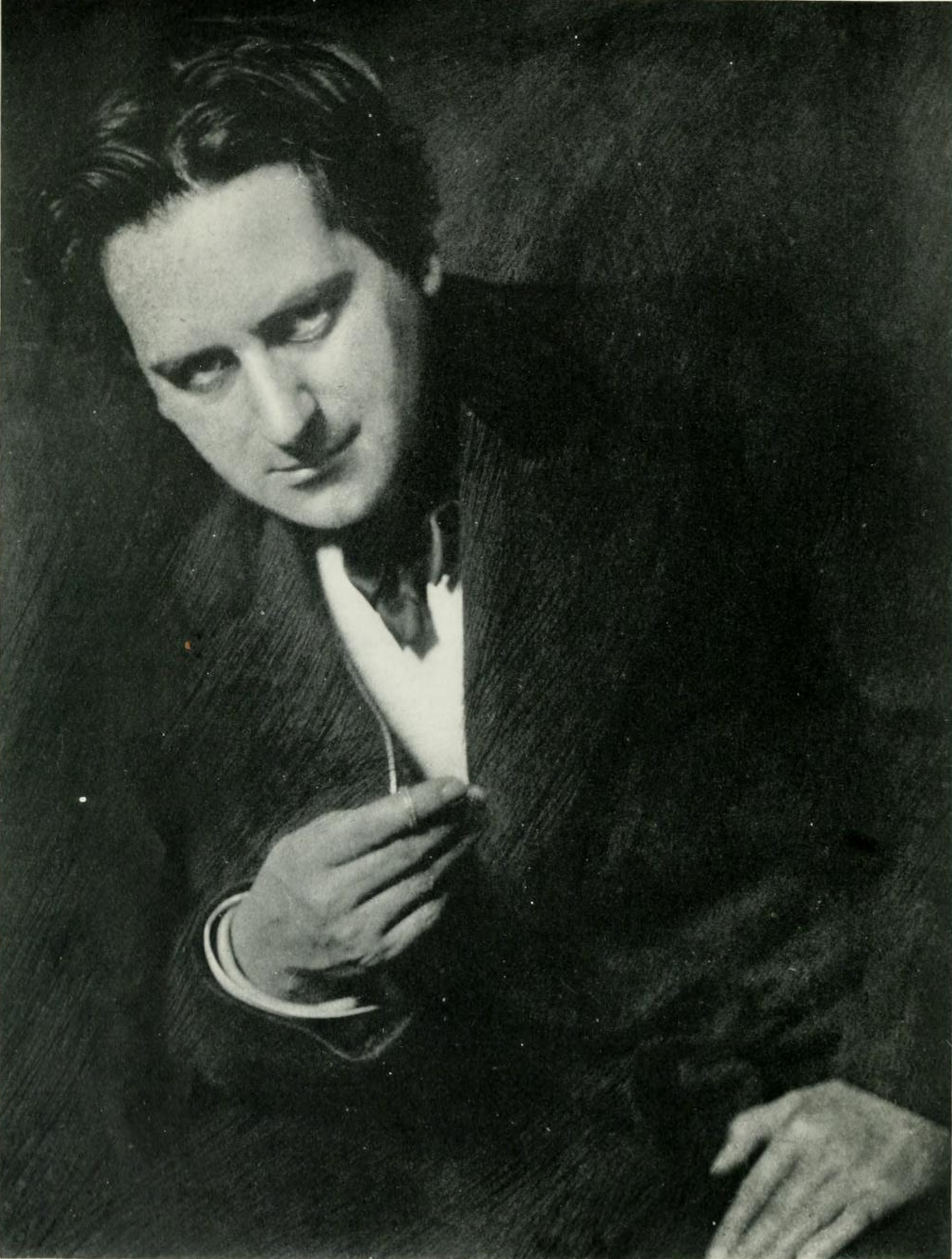
Cavendish Morton

Cavendish Morton (1874–1939) was a British actor, photographer, and art director. Morton was born in New York City to British parents, and made his stage debut in a New York production of The Prodigal Daughter. He moved to London in the late 1890s and worked with the companies of Charles Wyndham and H. Beerbohm Tree. He was the author of The Art of Theatrical Make-up (1909) and Cinema Acting: A Handbook for Amateurs (1914), a presumed-to-be lost book that may be the earliest British guide to film acting. He also directed the 1916 silent film The Broken Melody.

He was married to the novelist and actress Concordia Merrel, who posed for many of his photographs, and with her was the father of the twin painters Cavendish Morton and Concord Morton. After a period of nomadic wandering the family settled in Bembridge in the Isle of Wight where the couple home-schooled their sons with an emphasis on the arts.

He died in a London nursing home on 29 June 1939 aged 65. Much of his photographic work was lost when his studio caught fire during the London Blitz bombing of World War II.
