= Richard Whiteing =

18th-19th century English author and journalist

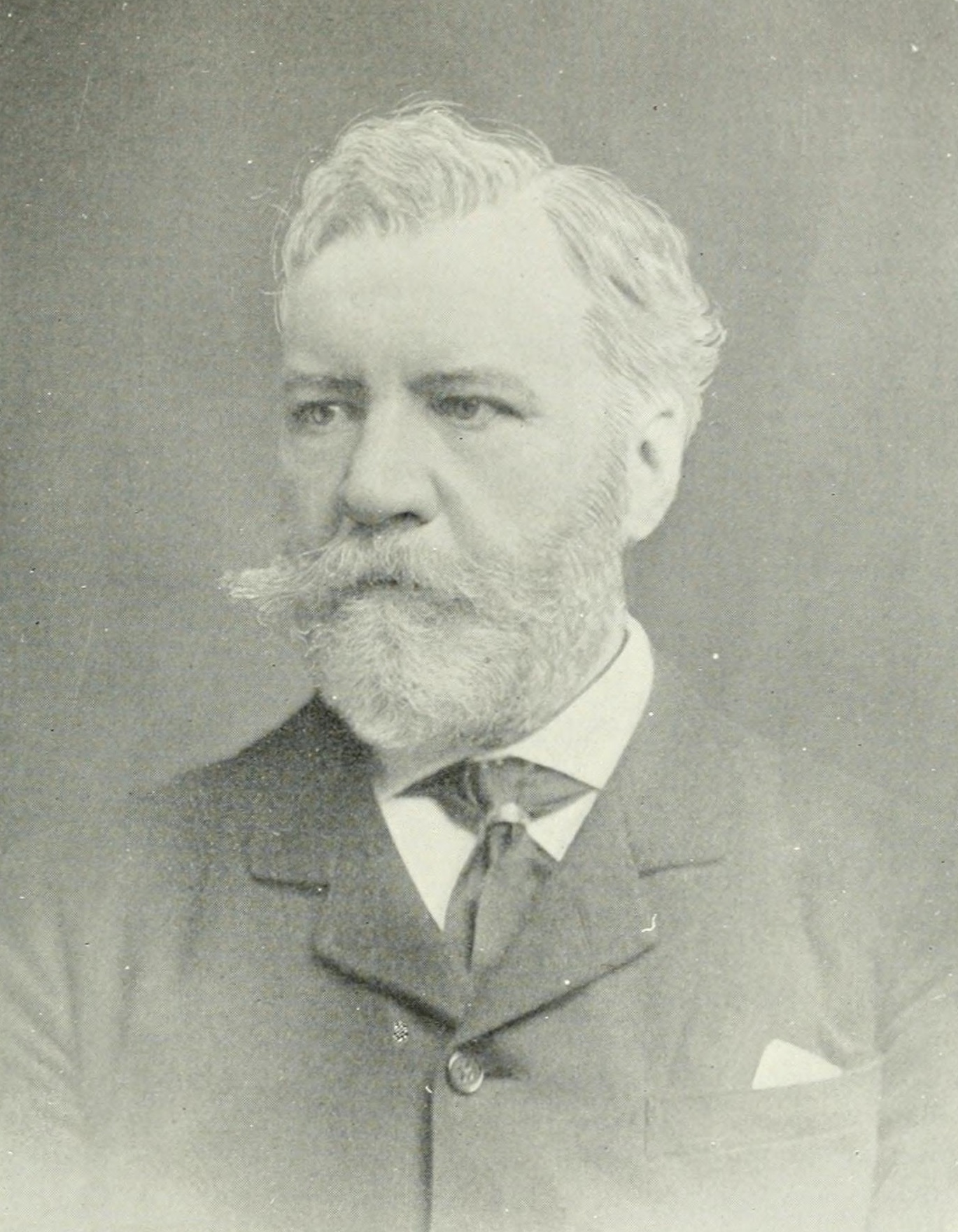
Richard Whiteing, ca. 1904.

Richard Whiteing (27 July 1840 – 29 June 1928) was an English author and journalist.

== Biography ==
Richard Whiteing was born in London the son of Mary Lander and William Whiteing, a civil servant employed as an Inland Revenue Officer. His mother died early and Richard claimed to have spent much of his upbringing with foster parents.

For seven years in his youth Whiteing was apprenticed to Benjamin Wyon as a medalist and seal-engraver; meanwhile he was also educating himself on the side. In 1866, after a failed attempt to start his own medalist business, he turned to journalism as a career. He made his debut with a series of papers in the Evening Star in 1866, printed separately in the next year as Mr Sprouts, His Opinions. He became leader-writer and correspondent on the Morning Star, and was subsequently on the staff of the Manchester Guardian, the New York World, and for many years the Daily News, resigning from the last-named paper in 1899.

His first novel The Democracy (3 vols, 1876) was published under the pseudonym of Whyte Thorne. His second novel The Island (1888) was about a utopian life on Pitcairn Island; it attracted little attention until, years afterwards, its successor, No. 5 John Street (1899), made him famous; the earlier novel was then republished. No. 5 John Street has the character from the first novel return to London, but has no money, and describes the low-life of London. Later works were The Yellow Van (1903), Ring in the New (1906), All Moonshine (1907). In 1919, Whiteing coined the precursor term to the name of World War II, which he referred to as "World War No. 2." He predicted that this war would arise some time in the future to resolve the social upheaval caused by World War I.

Whiteing died 29 June 1928 in Hampstead and is buried in the Parish Church of St. John-at-Hampstead, Church Row, London near his son Richard Clifford (1870–1923).

== Family ==
Whiteing's autobiography, My Harvest, written in 1915, led many to believe he was an only child, whose mother had died in the 1840s when he was quite young. However family historian, Kathleen Whiteing Fitzgerald, revealed that Whiteing actually had three siblings. There were two brothers, Robert & George, who had both lived well into adulthood and a sister Elizabeth who died as an infant. Fitzgerald noted that in the 1861 London census Whiteing, then 20 years old, was listed as living with both of his parents and his younger brother George. Richard's father, William, died in Beverley in 1876, and his mother died in Kensington in 1884.

In 1869 Whiteing married Helen Watson Harris (1848-1921), the ward/niece of Townsend Harris, US Ambassador to Japan. To their marriage was born an only child in 1872, Richard Clifford Whiteing. Their son married Ellen Marie Louise "Nell" du Maurier in 1908, the niece of illustrator and novelist George du Maurier and cousin of actor Gerald du Maurier.

After Whiteing's separation from Helen, he lived for many years with journalist and children's author Alice Corkran. He was also friends with her sister Henriette, who wrote an intimate account of him in her Celebrities and I.
