= Mary Odette =

French-British actress (1901–1987)

- Odette in May 1922
- Born: Marie Odette Goimbault; 10 August 1901; Dieppe, French Third Republic
- Died: 26 March 1987 (aged 85); Stockport, Cheshire, United Kingdom
- Other name: Mary Odette
- Occupation: Actress
- Years active: 1916–1928

Marie Odette Goimbault (10 August 1901 – 26 March 1987), known professionally as Mary Odette, was a French-born silent-screen actress.

Odette starred in a number of films made by Astra Films. After the slump of 1924 dramatically reduced the number of British films being made, she appeared in several continental European productions. She retired from films in 1928, shortly before the arrival of sound films in Britain.

== Filmography ==
- Cynthia in the Wilderness (1916)
- The Greatest Wish in the World (1918)
- The Way of an Eagle (1918)
- Spinner o' Dreams (1918)
- The Top Dog (1918)
- The Wages of Sin (1918)
- Peace, Perfect Peace (1918)
- The Lackey and the Lady (1919)
- As He Was Born (1919)
- Whosoever Shall Offend (1919)
- Dombey and Son (1919)
- Castle of Dreams (1919)
- The Lady Clare (1919)
- With All Her Heart (1920)
- Enchantment (1920)
- As God Made Her (1920)
- Torn Sails (1920)
- John Heriot's Wife (1920)
- Inheritance (1920)
- The Breed of the Treshams (1920)
- Mr. Gilfil's Love Story (1920)
- The Wonderful Year (1921)
- No. 5 John Street (1921)
- All Roads Lead to Calvary (1921)
- The Double Event (1921)
- Cherry Ripe (1921)
- The Crimson Circle (1922)
- The Hypocrites (1923)
- The Lion's Mouse (1923)
- The Diamond Man (1924)
- Eugene Aram (1924)
- Not for Sale (1924)
- Nets of Destiny (1924)
- Kean (1924)
- Father Voss (1925)
- She (1925)
- The Elegant Bunch (1925)
- The Morals of the Alley (1925)
- If Youth But Knew (1926)
- Celle qui domine (1927)
- Emerald of the East (1928)
