= Astra Films =

British film company

Astra Films was a British film production and distribution company of the silent era. It was set up in Leeds following the First World War by the film director Herbert Wilcox, his younger brother Charles Wilcox and H.W. Thompson, a leading figure in film distribution in the North of England. After the company's initial success, Wilcox left the firm to set up on his own and rose to become one of the most successful independent producer-directors in the world. After a merger the company released films under the name Astra-National.

While smaller than the leading British studios Ideal Films and Stoll Pictures, it was an important producer of films before the Slump of 1924. As was common during the era, many of the same writers, directors and a stock company of actors worked on various different films for the company. After Herbert Wilcox left the company, the majority of films were directed by Kenelm Foss and featured stars such as Mary Odette, Lionelle Howard and Roy Travers.

== Selected filmography ==
- The Breed of the Treshams (1920)
- Cherry Ripe (1921)
- The Street of Adventure (1921)
- The Double Event (1921)
- The Wonderful Story (1922)
- Paddy the Next Best Thing (1923)
- Southern Love (1924)
- Decameron Nights (1924)
- The Flag Lieutenant (1926)

== Bibliography ==
- Low, Rachael. The History of the British Film, 1918-1929. George Allen & Unwin, 1971. ISBN 978-0-04-791021-0.
