= Fred Rains =

British actor (1860–1945)

Frederick William Rains (28 January 1860 – 3 December 1945) was a British actor and film director.

His father, also called Alfred Rains, was a coachbuilder. On 27 October 1884, at St Michael's Church, Lambeth, he married Emily Eliza Cox. They had several children, including the Hollywood actor Claude Rains (born 1889).

Rains died on 3 December 1945, aged 85.

== Selected filmography ==
Actor

- The Broken Melody (1916)
- The New Clown (1916)
- The Marriage of William Ashe (1916)
- Sally in Our Alley (1916)
- Sally Bishop (1916)
- A Welsh Singer (1916)
- Land of My Fathers (1921)
- Expiation (1922)
- Little Brother of God (1922)
- A Rogue in Love (1922)
- The Lady Owner (1923)
- The Audacious Mr. Squire (1923)
- Mist in the Valley (1923)
- The Indian Love Lyrics (1923)
- The Money Habit (1924)
- The Conspirators (1924)
- Nell Gwyn (1926)
- The Only Way (1927)
- The Inseparables (1929)
- The Runaway Princess (1929)
- The Clue of the New Pin (1929)
- Stepping Stones (1931)
- Verdict of the Sea (1932) as Martin
- A Royal Demand (1933) as Walters
- The Broken Rosary (1934) as Professor
- The Immortal Gentleman (1935) as Miser
- Chick (1936) as Warden

Director

- Land of My Fathers (1921)
