= Kenelm Foss =

British actor (1885–1963)

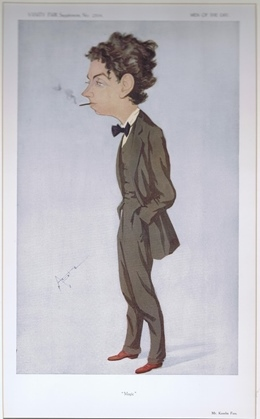
Caricature of Kenelm Foss by "Astz" in Vanity Fair, 1913

Kenelm Foss (13 December 1885 – 28 November 1963) was a British actor, theatre director, author, screenwriter and film director.

== Early life and education ==
He was born in Croydon, Surrey and studied art at the Wellesley School of Art and in Paris. He was, however, more interested in theatre and in 1903 made his first appearance on the London stage at the Royal Court Theatre. He then spent four years at the Glasgow Repertory Theatre producing plays and acting before returning to London to manage the Lyric Theatre in the Strand.

== Career and publications ==
He produced the play Magic by G.K.Chesterton and which title was the caption to the Vanity Fair caricature of him on 17 December 1913. He then produced the first performance of Chekhov’s The Cherry Orchard in England and in Europe, after which he obliged to leave the theatre for a while when he contracted tuberculosis.

In 1915 he began a new career as a film director utilizing the production techniques and acting skills he had learned in the theatre. Many of his films were made for Astra Films. Following a relapse of his illness, he was able to return to the theatre and in the early 1920s spent some time in New York City where he produced a play on Broadway starring John Barrymore.

He published several novels, works of poetry and biographical studies of Richard Brinsley Sheridan and J. M. W. Turner. With Mary Pickford, Charlie Chaplin and others he published Practical Course in Cinema Acting in Ten Complete Lessons in 1920.

In 1925 he opened a sandwich bar in London which soon became a great success with the theatre fraternity and was followed by more "Sandys" to meet the demand.

== Death and family ==
Foss died in 1963. He had married the actress Elisabeth Gilson and had six children, two of whom died in childhood.

In 2005 his daughter Fanny Burney Woolnough published (under the name Fanny Burney) a biography of her father, Stage, Screen and Sandwiches: the Remarkable Life of Kenelm Foss.

== Publications ==
- The Hem of the Flag. Topical Monologue (European War, 1914) (play) (1914)
- Love in Spain or If our love should die (play) (1916)
- Till Our Ship Comes In ... Chapters in the Life of Two Poor Dears with H M Brock (1919)
- Practical Course in Cinema Acting in Ten Complete Lessons with various film actors (1920)
- "The Dead Pierrot" Poems
- "Nuncs' Causeway A Bohemian Fantasy" A Novel (1929) Cayme Press Ltd, 21 Soho Square, London with Foreword by Author 'Old Windsor Lock, Summer 1929
- The Double Life of J. M. W. Turner (1938)
- Bohemian Love Song (1938)
- Here Lies Richard Brinsley Sheridan (Jun 1940)
- Unwedded bliss, vol.I: first 30 examples (1949)
- The Best of A.J. Alan with A.J Alan (1954)
- A Swinburne Anthology. Verse, drama, prose, criticism. Selected, with a biographical introduction, by Kenelm Foss with Algernon Charles Swinburne (1955)
- Beardsley: His best fifty drawings (1955)
- Short Stories with A.J. Alan (Jun 1968)

== Selected filmography ==
=== Director ===
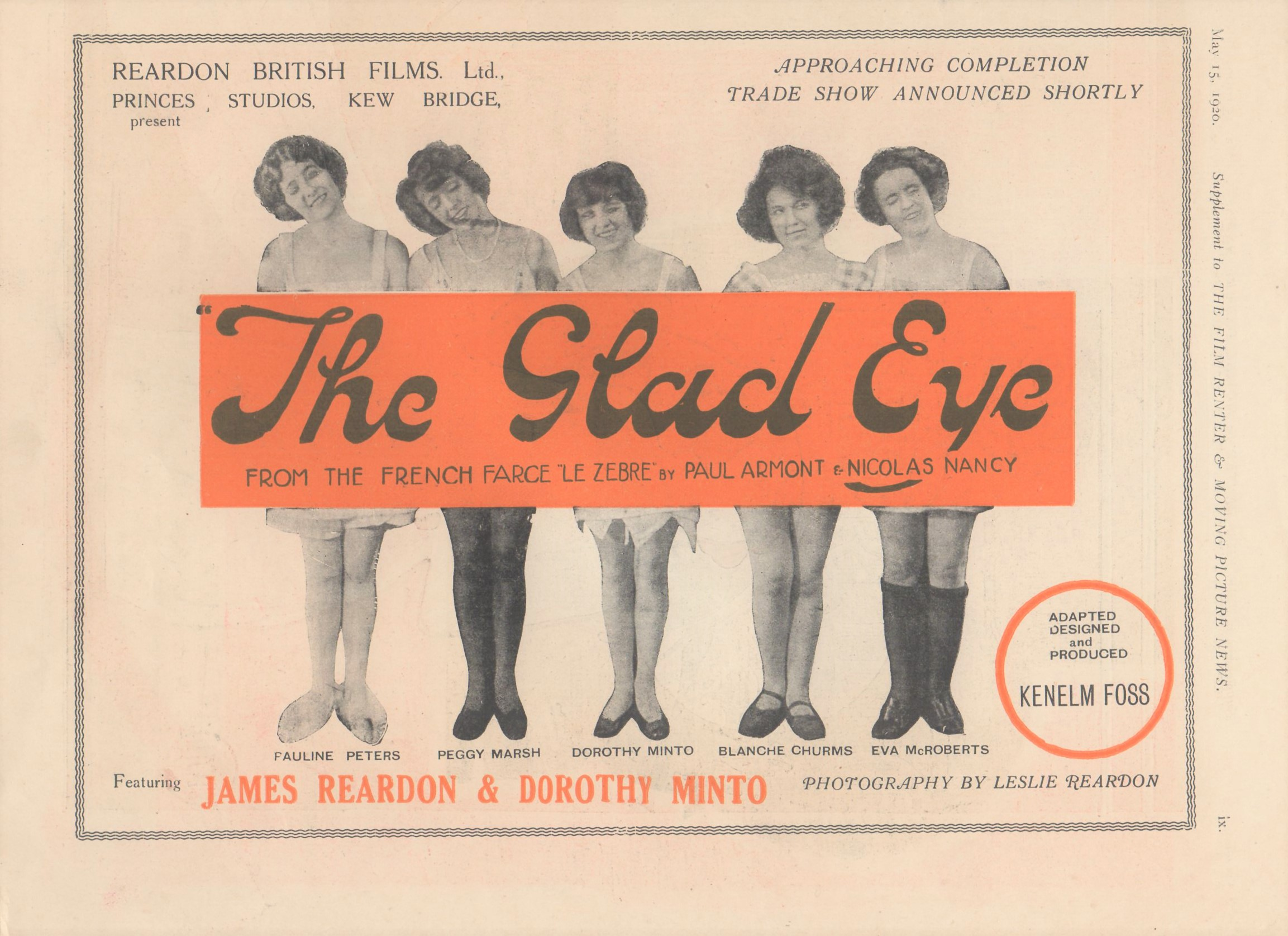
The Glad Eye poster (1920).

- A Peep Behind the Scenes (1918)
- Fancy Dress (1919)
- I Will (1919)
- A Little Bit of Fluff (1919)
- The Glad Eye (1920)
- The Breed of the Treshams (1920)
- A Bachelor Husband (1920)
- The Street of Adventure (1921)
- The Wonderful Year (1921)
- All Roads Lead to Calvary (1921)
- No. 5 John Street (1921)
- The Headmaster (1921)
- The Double Event (1921)
- A Romance of Old Baghdad (1922)
- The House of Peril (1922)
- Dicky Monteith (1922)

=== Writer ===
- The Shulamite (1915)
- The Mother of Dartmoor (1916)
- Mother Love (1916)
- The Hypocrites (1916)
- The Labour Leader (1917)
- The Grit of a Jew (1917)
- Daddy (1917)
- Peace, Perfect Peace (1918)
- The Man and the Moment (1918)
- Once Upon a Time (1918)
- Rock of Ages (1918)
- The Slave (1918)
- The Divine Gift (1918)
- All the Sad World Needs (1918)
- My Sweetheart (1918)
- Under Suspicion (1919)
- The Soul of Guilda Lois (1919)
- When It Was Dark (1919)
- Kean (1924)
- Mrs. Dane's Defence (1933)

=== Actor ===
- Love in a Wood (1915)
- Arsène Lupin (1916)
- The Top Dog (1918)
- The Wages of Sin (1918)
- Once Upon a Time (1918)
- Not Guilty (1919)
- Whosoever Shall Offend (1919)
- Kean (1924)
