= Arrigo Bocchi =

British-Italian film director and producer

- Born: 1871; Italy
- Died: Unknown
- Occupation(s): Film director, Producer

Arrigo Bocchi (c.1871 – ?) was a British-Italian film director and producer of the silent era. After the First World War Bocchi worked for Windsor Films at the Catford Studios in London as well as shooting films on location in Italy.

== Selected filmography ==
=== Producer ===
- Disraeli (1916)
- The Black Night (1916)
- A King of the People (1917)
- Ora Pro Nobis (1917)

=== Director ===
- The Slave (1918)
- Not Guilty (1919)
- The Polar Star (1919)

== Bibliography ==
- Low, Rachael. The History of the British Film 1918–1929. George Allen & Unwin, 1971.
