= Catford Studios =

Former British film studio in Catford, Southeast London

Coordinates: 51°25′43.2″N 0°0′44.88″W

Catford Studios was a British film studio located in Southend, London, just southeast of Catford in Southeast London which operated from 1914 to 1921. It was also known as the Windsor Studios.

The studio was constructed in 1914, and produced a number of notable films during the First World War such as Tom Brown's Schooldays and the first Edgar Wallace adaptation The Man Who Bought London. After the war the studio was acquired by the Broadwest Company of Walter West who used it largely as an overflow facility for his main base at Walthamstow Studios. When Broadwest ran into financial problems, the studio was closed.

== Bibliography ==
- Low, Rachael. History of the British Film, 1918–1929. George Allen & Unwin, 1971.
- Warren, Patricia. British Film Studios: An Illustrated History. Batsford, 2001.
