= The Lilac Sunbonnet =

1922 film

- Directed by: Sidney Morgan
- Written by: S. R. Crockett (novel); Sidney Morgan
- Produced by: Frank E. Spring
- Starring: Joan Morgan; Warwick Ward; Pauline Peters; Arthur Lennard
- Production company: Progress Films
- Distributed by: Butcher's Film Service
- Release date: July 1922
- Country: United Kingdom
- Languages: Silent; English intertitles

The Lilac Sunbonnet is a 1922 British silent drama film directed by Sidney Morgan and starring Joan Morgan, Warwick Ward and Pauline Peters.

== Cast ==
- Warwick Ward as Ralph Peden
- Joan Morgan as Winsome Charteris
- Pauline Peters as Jess Kissock
- Lewis Dayton as Capt. Greatorix
- Nell Emerald as Meg Kissock
- Forrester Harvey as Jock Gordon
- Arthur Lennard as Rev. Allen Walsh
- Charles Levey as Walter
- A. Harding Steerman as Rev. Gilbert Peden

== Bibliography ==
- Low, Rachael. The History of the British Film 1918-1929. George Allen & Unwin, 1971.
