= Margaret Blanche =

Danish actress

Marguerite Blanche
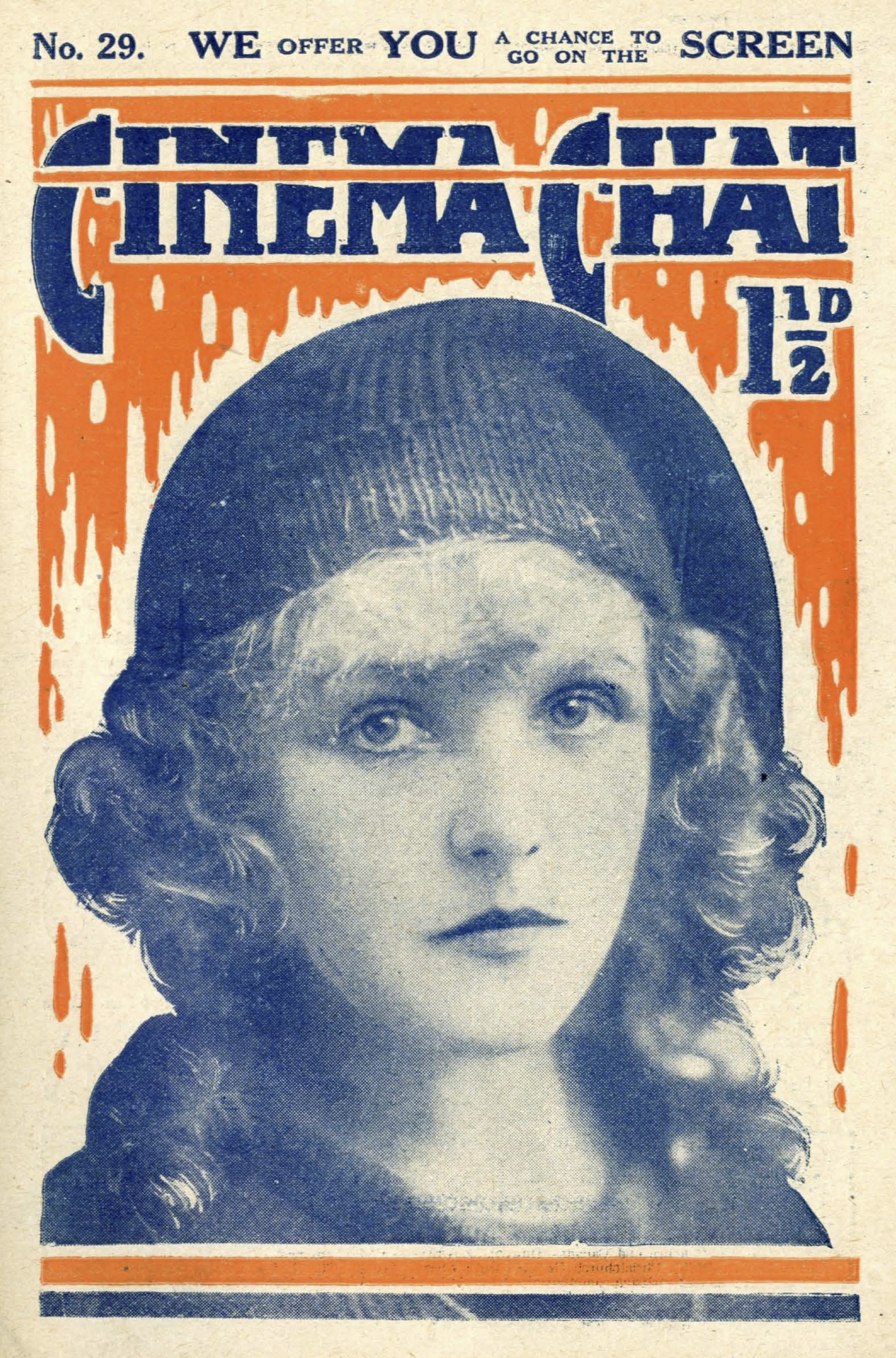
- On the cover of a 1919 magazine
- Born: Copenhagen, Denmark
- Other name: Margaret Jessen
- Occupation: Actress
- Years active: 1916-1920 (film)

Marguerite Blanche was a Danish actress notable for her starring roles in British silent films. She was born in Copenhagen as Margaret Jessen, but emigrated to Britain where she made twelve films for director-producers such as Cecil Hepworth and Sidney Morgan. Her final film was Morgan's The Woman of the Iron Bracelets in 1920. Morgan then replaced her as the star of his films with his own daughter Joan Morgan.

== Selected filmography ==
- Trelawny of the Wells (1916)
- A Place in the Sun (1916)
- The Grand Babylon Hotel (1916)
- The Grit of a Jew (1917)
- The Cobweb (1917)
- The Romance of Old Bill (1918)
- Sweet and Twenty (1919)
- The Black Sheep (1920)
- The Scarlet Wooing (1920)
- The Woman of the Iron Bracelets (1920)

== Bibliography ==
- Low, Rachael. The History of the British Film 1918-1929. George Allen & Unwin, 1971.
