= Dora De Winton =

British actress (1874–?)

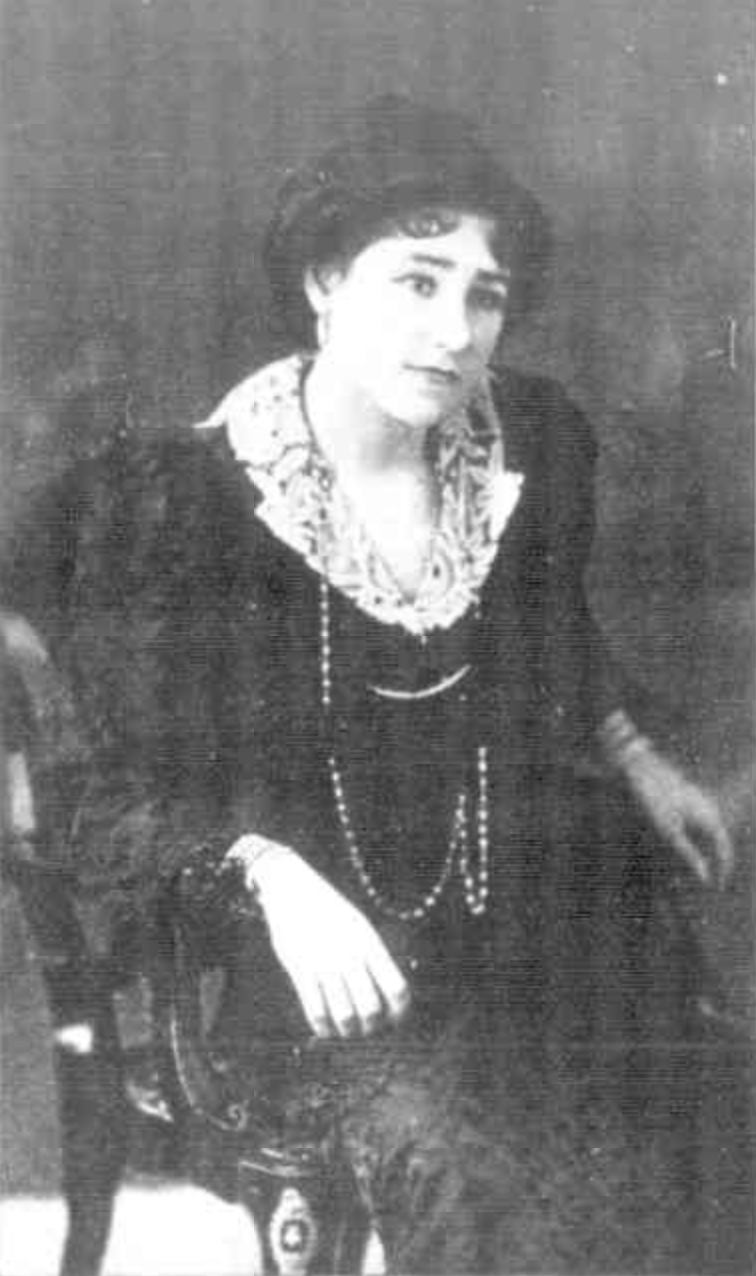
Dora De Winton appearing in A Soldier and a Man at the Lyceum Theatre, Sydney in 1899

Dora De Winton was a British actress of the silent era. Born Dora Wilson in London in 1874, De Winton was a well-known drama and comedy theatre performer during the 1880s. She starred in a number of films from 1912 to 1925, especially melodramas and crime films. She began her film career working with the British & Colonial Film Company in 1912, but with her first feature film in 1913 she worked with the Barker Film Company, where she would remain for most of her acting career. She may be best remembered for her role as Miss Western in Edwin J. Collins's Tom Jones starring Langhorn Burton and produced by the Ideal Film Company in 1917, and also for her last screen performance as Lady Barmouth in The Presumption of Stanley Hay, MP at the Stoll Film Company in 1925. She is also the sister of actress Alice De Winton.

== Full filmography ==
- The Fairy Doll (1912, short)
- In the Hands of London Crooks (1913)
- Jane Shore (1915, aka The Eternal Strife)
- The Vultures of London (1915, short)
- Eve's Daughter (1916)
- Chains of Bondage (1916)
- Tom Jones (1917)
- The House Opposite (1917)
- What Would a Gentleman Do? (1918)
- Jo the Crossing Sweeper (1918)
- The Chinese Puzzle (1919)
- Barnaby (1919)
- Wuthering Heights (1920)
- Mr. Gilfil's Love Story (1920)
- The Flame (1920)
- The Manchester Man (1920)
- The Crooked Man (1923)
- The Presumption of Stanley Hay, MP (1925)
