= Cats (1925 film) =

1925 British film by Leslie S. Hiscott

- Directed by: Leslie S. Hiscott
- Written by: Thomas le Breton
- Produced by: George A. Cooper
- Starring: Sydney Fairbrother; Irene Tripod
- Production company: Quality Plays
- Release date: January 1925 (UK)
- Country: United Kingdom

Cats is a 1925 silent-era British comedy film directed by Leslie S. Hiscott and featuring Sydney Fairbrother, Frank Stanmore and Irene Tripod.

== Cast ==
- Sydney Fairbrother as Mrs. May
- Irene Tripod as Mrs. McMull
- Frank Stanmore
- Annie Esmond
- Edward O'Neill
- James Reardon
- Percy Parsons
