= Sweet and Twenty =

- Directed by: Sidney Morgan
- Written by: Basil Hood (play); Sidney Morgan
- Produced by: Frank E. Spring
- Starring: Marguerite Blanche; Langhorn Burton; George Keene; Arthur Lennard
- Production company: Progress Films
- Distributed by: Butcher's Film Service
- Release date: November 1919
- Country: United Kingdom
- Languages: Silent; English intertitles

Sweet and Twenty is a 1919 British silent romance film directed by Sidney Morgan and starring Marguerite Blanche, Langhorn Burton and George Keene.

It adapts a play by Basil Hood.

The film revolves around the son of a cleric who leaves to Australia after being court-martialled. It had five reels.

== Cast ==
- Marguerite Blanche as Jean Trevellyn
- Langhorn Burton as Douglas Floyd
- George Keene as Eustace Floyd
- Arthur Lennard as Reverend James Floyd
- George Bellamy as Prynne
- Nell Emerald as Ellen

== Reception ==
"Sweet and Twenty is a charmingly produced English film, with story, photogtaphy, and-acting well above the average.", wrote The Era.

== Bibliography ==
- Low, Rachael. The History of the British Film 1918-1929. George Allen & Unwin, 1971.
