= Fires of Innocence =

1922 British silent drama film

- Directed by: Sidney Morgan
- Written by: George Stevenson (novel); Sidney Morgan
- Produced by: Frank E. Spring
- Starring: Joan Morgan; Bobbie Andrews; Arthur Lennard; Madge Tree
- Production company: Progress Films
- Distributed by: Butcher's Film Service
- Release date: September 1922
- Country: United Kingdom
- Languages: Silent; English intertitles

Fires of Innocence is a 1922 British silent drama film directed by Sidney Morgan and starring Joan Morgan, Bobbie Andrews and Arthur Lennard. It was based on George Stevenson's novel A Little World Apart.

== Cast ==
- Joan Morgan as Helen Dalmaine
- Bobbie Andrews as Arthur Dalmaine
- Arthur Lennard as Rev. Dalmaine
- Marie Illington as Lady Crane
- Madge Tree as Bella Blackburn
- Nell Emerald as Lydia Blackburn

== Bibliography ==
- Low, Rachael. The History of the British Film 1918-1929. George Allen & Unwin, 1971.
