= Two Little Wooden Shoes =

1920 film

- Directed by: Sidney Morgan
- Written by: Ouida (story); Sidney Morgan
- Starring: Joan Morgan; Langhorn Burton
- Production company: Progress Films
- Distributed by: Butcher's Film Service
- Release date: September 1920
- Country: United Kingdom
- Languages: Silent; English intertitles

Two Little Wooden Shoes is a 1920 British silent romance film directed by Sidney Morgan and starring Joan Morgan, Langhorn Burton and J. Denton-Thompson.

== Premise ==
An orphan walks to Paris to visit a sick artist, but discovers him living a dissolute lifestyle.

== Cast ==
- Joan Morgan as Dedee
- Langhorn Burton as Victor Flamen
- J. Denton-Thompson as Jeannot
- Constance Backner as Liza
- Faith Bevan as The Model
- Ronald Power as The Master
- Maud Cressall as Mme. Vallier

== Bibliography ==
- Low, Rachael. The History of the British Film 1918–1929. George Allen & Unwin, 1971.
