= The Temptress =

The Temptress may refer to:

- The Temptress (1926 film), an American silent romantic drama film
- The Temptress (1920 film), a British silent romance film
- The Temptress (1949 film), a British second feature drama film
- The Temptress (1951 film), a crime-melodrama film
- The Temptress, a ring name of professional wrestler Katarina Waters
