= A Man's Shadow =

1920 film

- Directed by: Sidney Morgan
- Written by: Robert Buchanan; Sidney Morgan
- Produced by: Frank E. Spring
- Starring: Langhorn Burton; Violet Graham; Gladys Mason; Arthur Lennard
- Production company: Progress Films
- Distributed by: Butcher's Film Service
- Release date: December 1920
- Country: United Kingdom
- Languages: Silent; English intertitles

A Man's Shadow is a 1920 British silent crime film directed by Sidney Morgan and starring Langhorn Burton, Violet Graham and Gladys Mason. In the film, a man murders a Jewish moneylender, but his doppelganger is accused of the crime.

== Cast ==
- Langhorn Burton as Peter Beresford / Julian Grey
- Violet Graham as Vivian Beresford
- Gladys Mason as Yolande Hampton
- Arthur Lennard as Robert Hampden
- J. Denton-Thompson as Williams
- Sidney Paxton as Billings
- Babs Ronald as Helen Beresford
- Warris Linden as Simon Oppenheim

== Bibliography ==
- Low, Rachael. The History of the British Film 1918-1929. George Allen & Unwin, 1971.
