= Lady Noggs =

1920 film

- Directed by: Sidney Morgan
- Written by: Cicely Hamilton (play); Edgar Jepson (novel); Sidney Morgan
- Starring: Joan Morgan; George Bellamy; Yolande Duquette; Mavis Clair
- Cinematography: Stanley Mumford
- Production company: Progress Films
- Distributed by: Butcher's Film Service
- Release date: January 1920
- Country: United Kingdom
- Languages: Silent; English intertitles

Lady Noggs (also known as Lady Noggs: Peeress) is a 1920 British silent drama film directed by Sidney Morgan and starring Joan Morgan, George Bellamy and Yolande Duquette.

== Cast ==
- Joan Morgan as Lady Noggs
- George Bellamy as Lord Errington
- Yolande Duquette as Miss Stetson
- Arthur Lennard as Reverend Grieg
- James Prior as Caldicott Beresford

== Bibliography ==
- Low, Rachael. The History of the British Film 1918-1929. George Allen & Unwin, 1971.
