= Drink (film) =

1917 British film by Sidney Morgan

- Directed by: Sidney Morgan
- Written by: Sidney Morgan; Charles Reade (play); Émile Zola (novel)
- Produced by: Harry T. Roberts
- Starring: Fred Groves; Irene Browne; Alice O'Brien
- Production company: British Pictures
- Distributed by: Gaumont British Distributors
- Release date: March 1917
- Running time: 6,000 feet
- Country: United Kingdom
- Languages: Silent; English intertitles

Drink is a 1917 British silent drama film directed by Sidney Morgan and starring Fred Groves, Irene Browne and Alice O'Brien. It was the film version of a play by Charles Reade, first performed in 1879 and based on Émile Zola's novel, L'Assommoir.

== Plot ==
A laundress takes to drink and dies after her alcoholic husband goes mad.

== Cast ==
- Fred Groves as Coupeau
- Irene Browne as Gervaise
- Alice O'Brien as Virginie
- George Foley as Gouget
- Lionel d'Aragon as Auguste Lautier
- Arthur Walcott as Chabot
- Joan Morgan as Gervaise, as a child
- Stanley Arthur as Bibi
- William Brandon as Mes-Bottes

== Bibliography ==
- Murphy, Robert. Directors in British and Irish Cinema: A Reference Companion. British Film Institute, 2006.
