= The Road to London =

1921 film

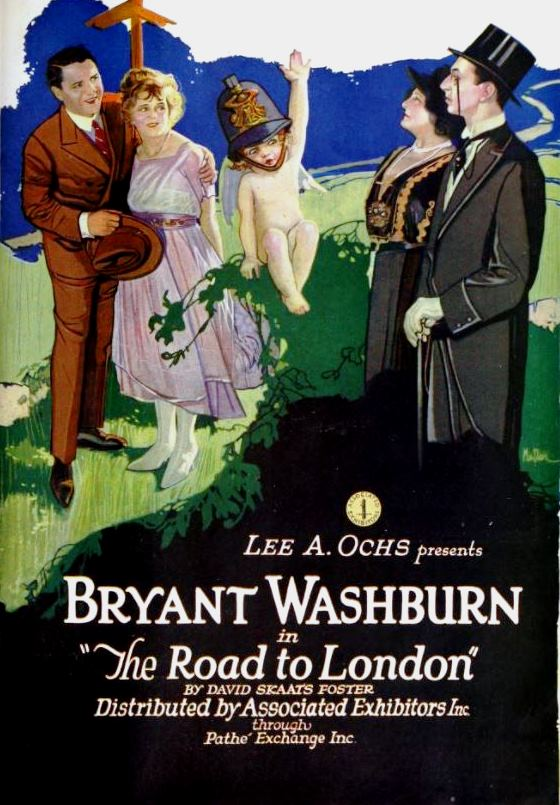
- Directed by: Eugene Mullin
- Written by: David Skaats Foster (novel); Dwight Cleveland
- Produced by: Lee Ochs
- Starring: Bryant Washburn; Saba Raleigh; Joan Morgan
- Cinematography: Charles J. Davis
- Production company: Screenplays Productions
- Distributed by: Associated Exhibitors
- Release date: June 3, 1921
- Running time: 50 minutes
- Country: United States
- Languages: Silent; English intertitles

The Road to London is a 1921 American silent drama film directed by Eugene Mullin and starring Bryant Washburn, Saba Raleigh and Joan Morgan. Location shooting took place in London.

== Plot ==
An American millionaire visiting London falls in love with a young aristocrat and elopes with her, pursued by a rival suitor.

== Cast ==
- Bryant Washburn as Rex Rowland
- Saba Raleigh as The Duchess
- Gibb McLaughlin as The Count
- Joan Morgan as The Lady Emily
- George J. Folsey as Rex's Father
- Rev. Dr. Batchelor as The Vicar
- Bertram Fox Hayes as Captain of H.M.S. Olympic
- Mabel Washburn as Maid

== Production ==
Exteriors for the film were shot on location in Maidenhead, with some scenes shot in Piccadilly Circus and on various London streets, in the autumn of 1920. The production was plagued by cloudy weather, with the sun being obscured for hours at a time.

== Preservation ==
With no holdings located in archives, The Road to London is considered a lost film.

== Bibliography ==
- Munden, Kenneth White. The American Film Institute Catalog of Motion Pictures Produced in the United States, Part 1. University of California Press, 1997.
