= Violet Graham =

English actress (1890–1967)

- Born: 9 November 1890; England; United Kingdom
- Died: 1967 (aged 76–77)
- Occupation: Actor
- Years active: 1912–1938 (film)

Violet Graham (9 November 1890 – 1967) was an English stage and film actress. Graham played leading roles in several films of the silent era, often appearing in those of the director Sidney Morgan such as Auld Lang Syne. Graham was in the original cast of the 1909 musical The Arcadians.

== Selected filmography ==
- Jobson's Luck (1913)
- The Charlatan (1916)
- On the Banks of Allan Water (1916)
- Auld Lang Syne (1917)
- A Bid for Fortune (1917)
- The Lackey and the Lady (1919)
- A Man's Shadow (1920)
- The Mystery of Thor Bridge (1923)
- Trainer and Temptress (1925)
- Lily of Laguna (1938)

== Bibliography ==
- Low, Rachael. The History of the British Film 1914 - 1918. George Allen & Unwin, 1950.
