= The Mayor of Casterbridge (1921 film) =

1921 film

- Directed by: Sidney Morgan
- Based on: The Mayor of Casterbridge by Thomas Hardy
- Starring: Fred Groves, Pauline Peters, Warwick Ward, Nell Emerald, Mavis Clair
- Production company: Sidney Morgan's Shoreham Beach studio
- Release date: 1921
- Country: United Kingdom
- Language: Silent

The Mayor of Casterbridge is a 1921 British silent film drama directed by Sidney Morgan and starring Fred Groves, Pauline Peters and Warwick Ward. It was an adaptation of the 1886 novel The Mayor of Casterbridge by Thomas Hardy and was made with Hardy's collaboration.

The film was largely filmed in Sussex, mainly in Steyning and partly at Morgan's Shoreham Beach studio, with other scenes filmed in the Dorset town of Dorchester, the actual setting of Casterbridge.

== Partial cast ==
- Fred Groves – Michael Henchard
- Pauline Peters – Susan Henchard
- Warwick Ward – Newson
- Nell Emerald – Furmity Woman
- Mavis Clair – Elizabeth Jane
