= A Lowland Cinderella =

1921 film

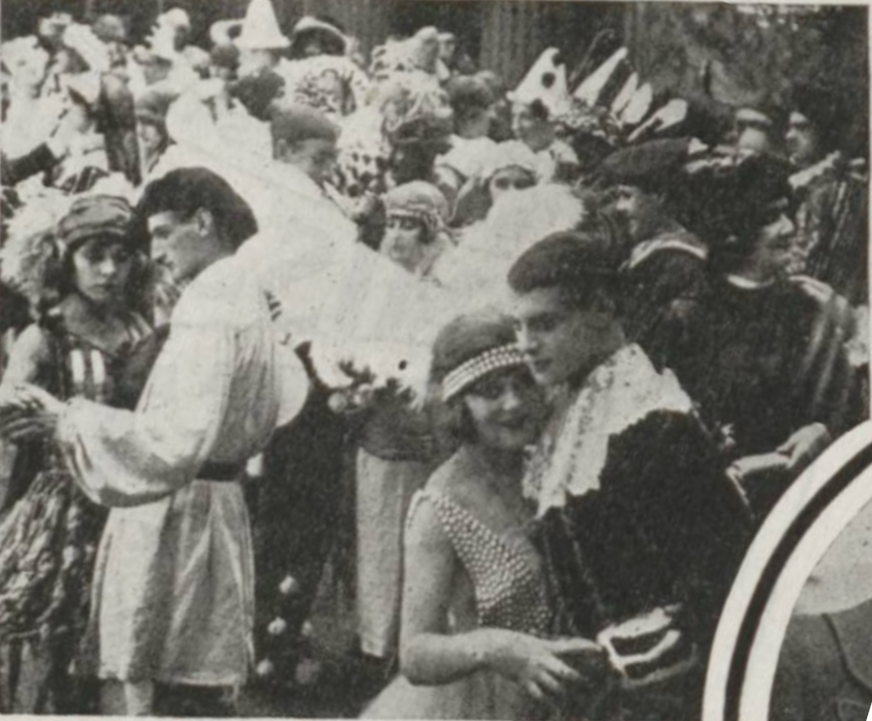
- Directed by: Sidney Morgan
- Written by: S. R. Crockett (novel)
- Starring: Joan Morgan; Ralph Forbes; George Foley; Mavis Clair
- Cinematography: Stanley Mumford
- Production company: Progress Films
- Distributed by: Butcher's Film Service; Second National Film Corporation (US)
- Release date: December 1921
- Running time: 58 minutes
- Country: United Kingdom
- Languages: Silent; English intertitles

A Lowland Cinderella is a 1921 British silent romance film adaptation of S. R. Crockett's novel directed by Sidney Morgan and starring Joan Morgan, Ralph Forbes and George Foley.

== Plot ==
A Scottish girl, Hester Stirling, whose father, David Stirling, is a gold prospector in South Africa, leaves behind a bag full of precious stones. Her evil guardian, Dr. Silvanus Torpichan, appropriates it and forces her to work as a servant in his home.

== Cast ==
- Joan Morgan as Hester Stirling
- Ralph Forbes as Master of Darrock
- George Foley as David Stirling
- Mary Carnegie as Mrs. Torpichan
- Mavis Clair as Ethel Torpichan
- Nell Emerald as Megsy
- Eileen Grace as Claudia Torpichan
- Charles Levey as Dr. Silvanus Torpichan
- Kate Phillips as Grandmother Stirling
- Cecil Susands as Tom Torpichan
- Frances Wetherall as Duchess of Niddisdale

== Bibliography ==
- Low, Rachael. The History of the British Film 1918-1929. George Allen & Unwin, 1971.
