= Moth and Rust =

1921 film

- Directed by: Sidney Morgan
- Written by: Sidney Morgan
- Starring: Sybil Thorndike; Malvina Longfellow; Langhorn Burton; Cyril Raymond
- Production company: Progress Films
- Distributed by: Butcher's Film Service
- Release date: November 1921
- Country: United Kingdom
- Languages: Silent; English intertitles

Moth and Rust is a 1921 British silent drama film directed by Sidney Morgan and starring Sybil Thorndike, Malvina Longfellow and Langhorn Burton.

== Cast ==
- Sybil Thorndike as Mrs Brand
- Malvina Longfellow as Janet Black
- Langhorn Burton as Ray Meredith
- Cyril Raymond as Fred Black
- George Bellamy as MacAlpine Brand
- Malcolm Tod as Sir George Trefusis
- Ellen Nicholls as Lady Trefusis
- Phyllis Le Grand as Lady Anne Varney

== Bibliography ==
- Low, Rachael. The History of the British Film 1918-1929. George Allen & Unwin, 1971.
