= The Clemenceau Case =

1915 film

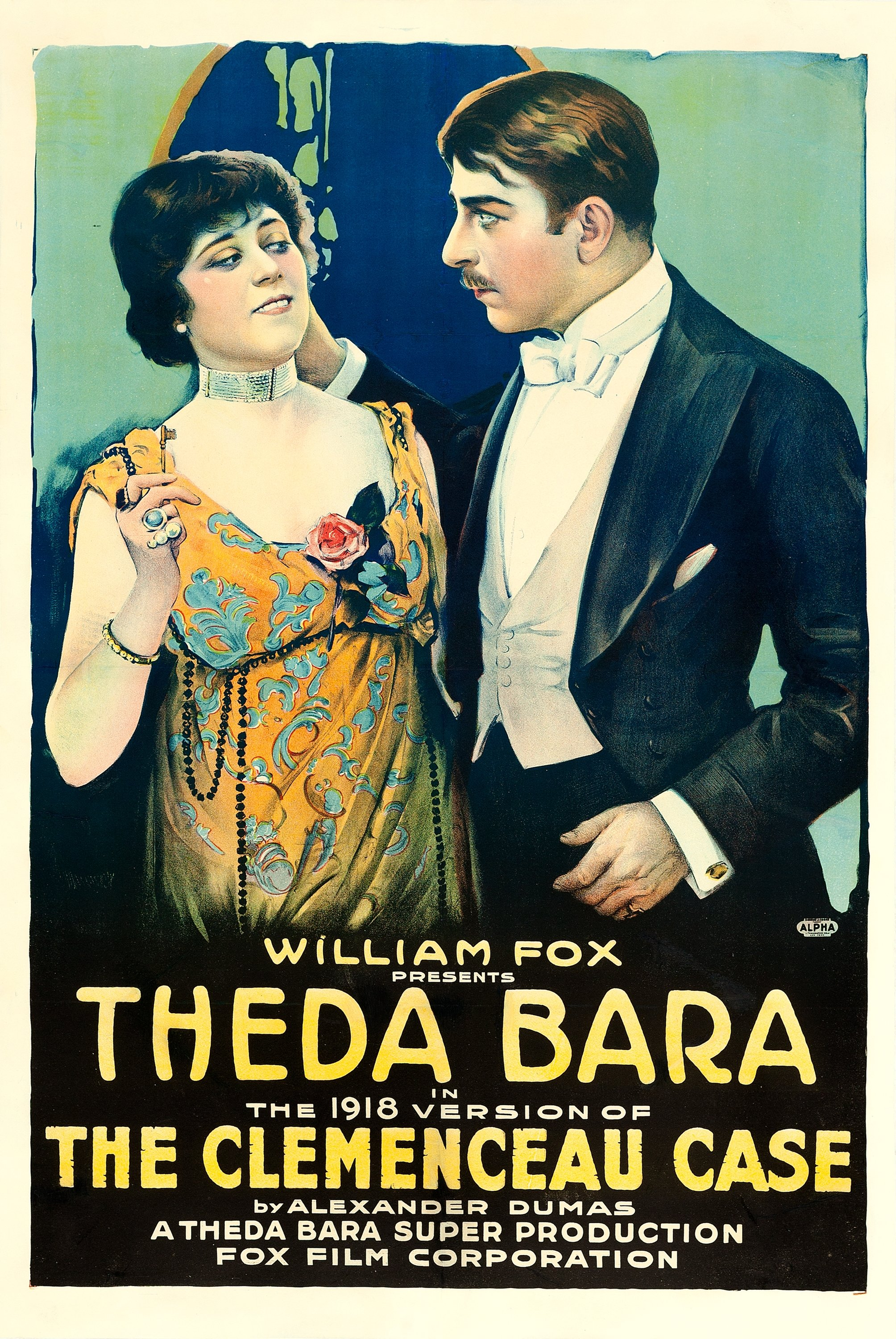
- Poster for the 1918 reissue of the film.
- Directed by: Herbert Brenon
- Written by: Herbert Brenon
- Based on: L'affaire Clémenceau by Alexandre Dumas, fils
- Produced by: William Fox
- Starring: Theda Bara; William E. Shay
- Cinematography: Phil Rosen
- Distributed by: Fox Film Corporation
- Release date: April 12, 1915
- Country: United States
- Language: Silent (English intertitles)

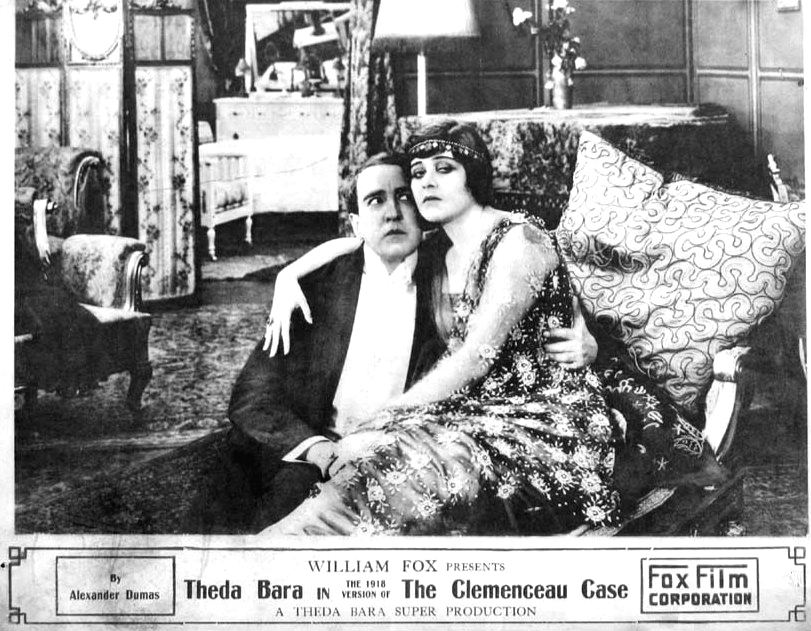
Lobby card

The Clemenceau Case is a 1915 American silent drama film written and directed by Herbert Brenon and costarring Theda Bara and William H. Shay. The film is based on the French novel L'affaire Clémenceau, by Alexandre Dumas, fils, and is now considered to be lost.

== Cast ==
- Theda Bara as Iza
- William E. Shay as Pierre Clemenceau
- Mrs. Allen Walker as Marie Clemenceau
- Stuart Holmes as Constantin Ritz
- Jane Lee as Janet
- Saba Raleigh as Countess Dobronowska (credited as Mrs. Cecil Raleigh)
- Frank Goldsmith as Duke Sergius
- Sidney Shields as Madame Ritz

== Reception ==
Like many American films of the time, The Clemenceau Case was subject to cuts by city and state film censorship boards. For example, the Chicago Board of Censors for the 1918 reissue of the film cut, in Reel 4, two scenes in Iza's bedroom between her and Constantin beginning with her locking the door, Reel 5, scene on couch between Iza and her husband in which gown falls from her shoulder, and the stabbing.

== See also ==
- 1937 Fox vault fire
