= Vi of Smith's Alley =

1921 film

Vi of Smith's Alley is a 1921 British silent drama film directed by Walter West and starring Violet Hopson, Cameron Carr and George Foley.

== Cast ==
- Violet Hopson - Vi Jeffries
- Cameron Carr - Sydney Baxter
- George Foley - Nathaniel Baxter
- Sydney Folker - Bill Saunders
- Amy Verity - Eileen Boston
- Peter Upcher - Reggie Drew
- Sydney Frayne - Teddy
