= Auld Lang Syne (1917 film) =

1917 British film by Sidney Morgan

- Directed by: Sidney Morgan
- Written by: Sidney Morgan
- Starring: Violet Graham; Henry Baynton; Sydney Fairbrother; George Bellamy
- Production company: British & Colonial
- Distributed by: Unicorn Films
- Release date: 1917
- Country: United Kingdom
- Languages: Silent; English intertitles

Auld Lang Syne is a 1917 British silent crime film directed by Sidney Morgan and starring Violet Graham, Henry Baynton and Sydney Fairbrother. The film is notable for marking the screen debut of Jack Buchanan, who went on to be a leading star. It was produced in a film studio at Ebury Street in Westminster.

== Cast ==
- Violet Graham as Beatrice Potter
- Henry Baynton as William Daneford
- Sydney Fairbrother as Mrs. Potter
- George Bellamy as Luke Potter
- Roy Travers as Ned Potter
- Jack Buchanan as Vane

== Bibliography ==
- Burton, Alan & Chibnall, Steve. Historical Dictionary of British Cinema. Scarecrow Press, 2013.
- Low, Rachael. The History of the British Film 1914 - 1918. George Allen & Unwin, 1950.
