= Adam Bede (film) =

1918 British silent film by Maurice Elvey

- Directed by: Maurice Elvey
- Screenplay by: Kenelm Foss
- Based on: Adam Bede by George Eliot
- Starring: Bransby Williams; Ivy Close; Malvina Longfellow
- Production company: International Exclusives
- Release date: 3 October 1918
- Country: United Kingdom
- Language: Silent

Adam Bede is a 1918 British silent drama film directed by Maurice Elvey and starring Bransby Williams, Ivy Close and Malvina Longfellow. It is an adaptation of the 1859 novel Adam Bede by George Eliot.

== Plot summary ==
A squire's grandson saves a farmer's niece from the charge of murdering her bastard baby.

== Cast ==
- Bransby Williams as Adam Bede
- Ivy Close as Hetty Sorrel
- Malvina Longfellow as Dinah Morris
- Gerald Ames as Arthur Donnithome
- Claire Pauncefort as Aunt Lydia
- Inez Bensusan as Sarah Thorne
- Charles Stanley as Seth Bede
- Ralph Forster as Squire
