= The Scarlet Wooing =

1920 film

- Directed by: Sidney Morgan
- Written by: Sidney Morgan
- Produced by: Frank E. Spring
- Starring: Eve Balfour; George Keene; Marguerite Blanche; Joan Morgan
- Production company: Progress Films
- Distributed by: Butcher's Film Service
- Release date: April 1920
- Country: United Kingdom
- Languages: Silent; English intertitles

The Scarlet Wooing is a 1920 British silent drama film directed by Sidney Morgan and starring Eve Balfour, George Keene and Marguerite Blanche. The screenplay concerns an author who writes a scandalous novel in order to raise funds for his daughter's operation.

== Cast ==
- Eve Balfour as Mrs. Raeburn
- George Keene as Paul Raeburn
- Marguerite Blanche as Nancy
- Joan Morgan as May Raeburn
- George Bellamy as Dr. Andrew Hooper
- Harry Newman as Roland Standish
- Arthur Walcott as John Pollock
- Edward Godal as Clubman
- Nigel Black-Hawkins as Clubman

== Bibliography ==
- Low, Rachael. The History of the British Film 1918-1929. George Allen & Unwin, 1971.
