= A Sheffield Blade =

- Directed by: Joseph Jay Bamberger; Harry T. Roberts
- Written by: A.G. Hales; Joseph Jay Bamberger
- Starring: George Foley; Jill Willis
- Production company: British Pictures
- Distributed by: British Pictures
- Release date: November 1918
- Country: United Kingdom
- Languages: Silent; English intertitles

A Sheffield Blade is a 1918 British silent drama film directed by Joseph Jay Bamberger and Harry T. Roberts and starring George Foley and Jill Willis.

== Cast ==
- George Foley as Billy Baxter
- Jill Willis as Ruth Roland

== Bibliography ==
- Palmer, Scott. British Film Actors' Credits, 1895–1987. McFarland, 1988.
