= Tom Jones (1917 film) =

- Directed by: Edwin J. Collins
- Written by: Eliot Stannard
- Based on: Tom Jones; 1749 novel by Henry Fielding
- Starring: Langhorn Burton; Sybil Arundale; Will Corrie; Wyndham Guise
- Production company: Ideal Film Company
- Distributed by: Ideal Film Company
- Release date: December 1917
- Running time: 6 reels
- Country: United Kingdom
- Language: English

Tom Jones is 1917 British comedy film directed by Edwin J. Collins and starring Langhorn Burton, Sybil Arundale and Will Corrie. It is an adaptation of the 1749 novel Tom Jones by Henry Fielding.

== Premise ==
After being disgraced at home Tom Jones enjoys a series of adventures on the road to London.

== Cast ==
- Langhorn Burton - Tom Jones
- Sybil Arundale - Molly Seagrim
- Will Corrie - Squire Western
- Wyndham Guise - Squire Allworthy
- Bert Wynne - William Blifil
- Nelson Ramsey - Thwackum
- Dora De Winton - Miss Western
- Jeff Barlow - Lieutenant Waters
