= Iron Justice =

1915 silent film

- Directed by: Sidney Morgan
- Written by: Sidney Morgan
- Produced by: John M. Payne
- Starring: Sydney Fairbrother; Julian Royce; Alfred Drayton
- Production company: Renaissance Films
- Distributed by: Kinematograph Trading Company
- Release date: January 1915
- Running time: 66 minutes
- Country: United Kingdom
- Languages: Silent; English intertitles

Iron Justice is a 1915 British silent crime drama film directed by Sidney Morgan and starring Sydney Fairbrother, Julian Royce and Alfred Drayton.

== Cast ==
- Fanny Tittell-Brune as Margaret Brand
- Sydney Fairbrother as Mrs. O'Connor
- Julian Royce as Martin Brand
- Alfred Drayton as Frank Deakin
- Cecil Fletcher as Ronald O'Connor
- Marguerita Jesson as Phyllis Brand
- A. Harding Steerman as Jabez Cole
- Joan Morgan as Phyllis as a Child

== Bibliography ==
- Low, Rachael. The History of British Film (Volume 3): The History of the British Film 1914 - 1918. Routledge, 2013.
