= Sybil Arundale =

English actress (1879–1965)

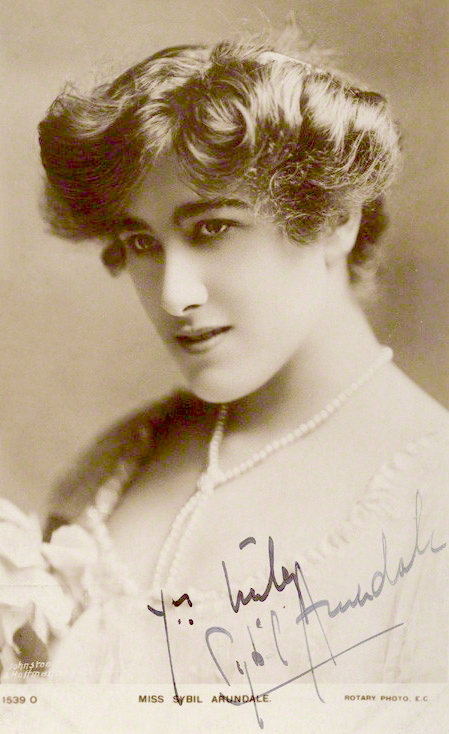
- Born: 20 June 1879; London, England
- Died: 5 September 1965 (aged 86); London, England
- Other name: Sybil Kelly
- Occupation: Actor

Sybil Arundale (20 June 1879 – 5 September 1965) was an English stage and film actress born Sybil Kelly.

From age 11, Arundale appeared with her sister Grace in music halls, where they were billed as "The Sisters Arundale". An early dramatic role, in 1898, was Oberon in A Midsummer Night's Dream and later as Rosalind in As You Like It. She appeared with the Birmingham Repertory Company, where she performed in Ibsen’s The Pillars of Society and The Wild Duck. She also appeared in pantomime and musicals, including Dick Whittington and His Cat, The Toreador, Venus by George Grossmith, My Lady Molly and The Cingalee. During World War I, she appeared in Fred Karno's 1915 revue 'All Women,' a show cast entirely of women, a novelty for the day. She also began to appear in films around this time. Later stage roles included a role in First-Class Passengers Only (1927). She made a few television appearances, the last in an episode of the 1956 British series The Adventures of the Scarlet Pimpernel.

== Partial filmography ==
- Tom Jones (1917)
- God and the Man (1918)
- The Chinese Puzzle (1919)
- Loose Ends (1930)
- Girls, Please! (1934)
