= William E. Shay =

American actor

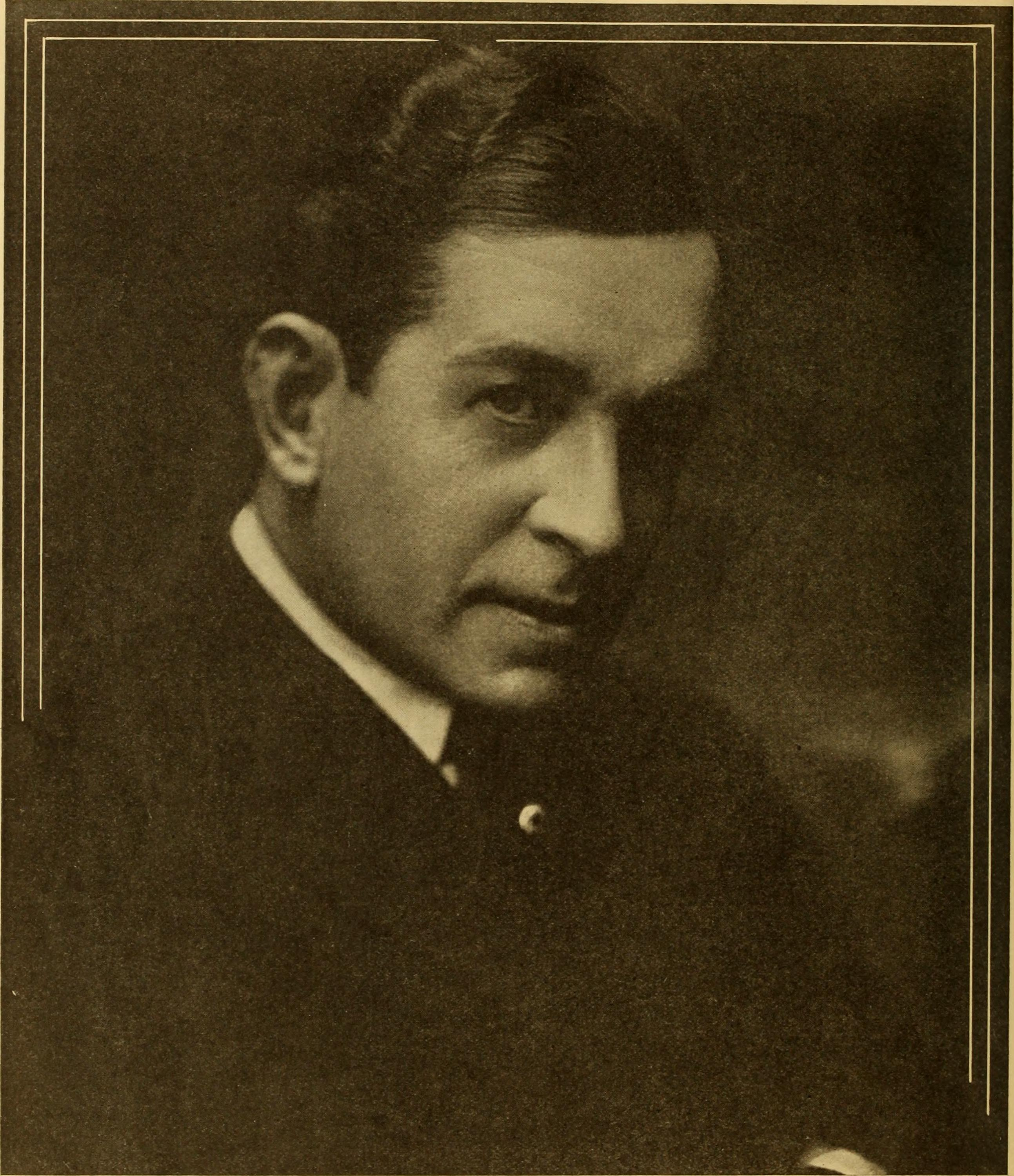
- William E. Shay (1916)
- Occupation: Actor
- Years active: c. 1900– c. 1927

William E. Shay (September 16, 1866 - ?) was an American actor of stage and silent films. He had leading roles including in The Clemenceau Case (1915), and A Daughter of the Gods (1916).

== Biography ==
In 1902, Shay appeared in Martha Morton's The Diplomat at Hoyt's Theatre; and in 1909, he appeared as Baron Sokoli in the stage production of John Luther Long's Kassa at Liberty Theatre on Broadway in New York City. He also starred in the stage productions Zaza and David Belasco's Du Barry.

Shay made his film debut in 1911 at age 45, in A Manly Man. He shot almost all of his films in a ten years span. He attended the first meeting of The Screen Club in 1912, a motion picture group founded in New York City.

== Filmography ==
- A Manly Man (1911) as Duncan; extant film
- When the Cat's Away (1911)
- The Girl and the Half-Back (1911)
- The Long Strike (1912)
- Angel of Death (1912)
- War on the Plains (1912)
- The Romance of an Old Maid (1912)
- Lady Audley's Secret (1912)
- Now I Lay Me Down to Sleep (1913)
- His Hour of Triumph (1913)
- Neptune's Daughter (1914), as King William; partially extant film
- The Kreutzer Sonata (1915), as Gregor Randar
- The Heart of Maryland (1915), as Alan Kendrick
- The Clemenceau Case (1915), as Pierre Clemenceau
- The Soul of Broadway (1915), as William Craig
- A Fool There Was (1915)
- The Sin (1915), as Luigi
- A Daughter of the Gods (1916)
- The Ruling Passion (1916)
- The Two Orphans (1915) as Chevalier de Vaudrey
- The Lone Wolf (1917)
- The Eternal Sin (1917) as The Duke of Ferrara
- The Fall of the Romanoffs (1918), as Theofan
- The Telephone Girl (1927), as Detective
