= The Snare (1918 film) =

- Directed by: Frank Wilson
- Produced by: Walter West
- Starring: Violet Hopson; George Foley; James Lindsay
- Production company: Broadwest
- Distributed by: Broadwest
- Release date: April 1918
- Country: United Kingdom
- Languages: Silent; English intertitles

The Snare is a 1918 British silent romance film directed by Frank Wilson and starring Violet Hopson, George Foley and Trevor Bland. The screenplay concerns a woman marries a millionaire who likes to go poaching.

== Cast ==
- Violet Hopson as Diane
- George Foley as Lord Marston
- Trevor Bland as Hugh
- James Lindsay as Carlton Flint

== Bibliography ==
- Palmer, Scott. British Film Actors' Credits, 1895-1987. McFarland, 1988.
