= Connie Emerald =

British actress (1892–1959)

- Born: Constance Gladys O'Shea; 20 August 1892; Peckham, London, England
- Died: 26 December 1959 (aged 67); Barstow, California, U.S.
- Occupation: Actress
- Years active: 1931-1940
- Spouse: Stanley Lupino
- Children: Ida Lupino
- Relatives: Nell Emerald (sister)

Constance Gladys O'Shea (20 August 1892 – 26 December 1959), known professionally as Connie Emerald, was a British stage actress. She was born in England, of Irish descent. As well as her theatre work, Emerald also appeared in five films, including 1931's A Safe Affair.

She was married to the entertainer and film star Stanley Lupino, with whom she had a daughter Ida Lupino who became a Hollywood star. When Ida set up her own film production company in the 1950s, she named it Emerald Productions after her mother.

Her sister was actress and film producer Nell Emerald.

== Bibliography ==
- Dixon, Wheeler Winston. Lost in the Fifties: Recovering Phantom Hollywood. SIU Press, 2005.
