= Walter Makes a Movie =

1922 film

- Directed by: Tom Seymour and Walter Forde
- Release date: 1922
- Country: United Kingdom
- Language: Silent

Walter Makes a Movie is a British short silent film, directed by Tom Seymour and Walter Forde in 1922. Forde plays a petty thief who steals from film star Pauline Highbrow (Pauline Peters). Pursued by the police he ends up in the Star Film Company's studio during the shooting of her latest melodrama.

This film is preserved in the National Film Archive. A version from a 1935 9.5mm home movie release is available to watch on YouTube channel "British Silents".

The short is Forde's fifth Zodiac film and is showing the actor "planning and producing a comedy picture".
