= Eve Balfour =

Eve Balfour may refer to:

- Lady Eve Balfour (1898–1990), English farmer, educator and organic farming pioneer
- Eve Balfour (actress) (1890–1955), British stage and film actress
