= A Safe Affair =

1931 film

- Directed by: Herbert Wynne
- Written by: Douglas Hoare; Eliot Stannard
- Produced by: Franklin Dyall; J.H. Roberts
- Starring: Franklin Dyall; Connie Emerald; Douglas Jefferies
- Production company: Langham
- Distributed by: Metro-Goldwyn-Mayer
- Release date: 1931
- Running time: 53 minutes
- Country: United Kingdom
- Language: English

A Safe Affair is a 1931 British crime film directed by Herbert Wynne and starring Franklin Dyall, Connie Emerald and Douglas Jefferies. It was written by Douglas Hoare and Eliot Stannard, and made as a quota quickie at the Nettlefold Studios in Walton-upon-Thames, distributed by MGM.

== Plot ==
The life of eccentric millionaire Rupert Gay is in constant danger, because of his feud with a financial rival. The latter raids Gay's house with his gang, but they are frustrated by his secretary and valet.

== Cast ==
- Franklin Dyall as Rupert Gay
- Connie Emerald as Blonde
- Douglas Jefferies as Henry
- James Knight as Tom
- J. Neil More as Otto Crann
- J.H. Roberts as Judd
- Jeanne Stuart as Olga Delgaroff
- George Turner as Jim
- Nancy Welford as Mary Bolton

== Reception ==
The Daily Film Renter wrote: "This belongs to the class of all-too-glib Quota pictures which can do home production little credit. The story, for one thing, is mere conventional trickery; the actors use mainly stage methods too ponderous to admit of any punch. ... On the whole very little intuition, it seems, was needed to put such a story on the screen, but even so it could have been better done.

Picturegoer wrote: "Herbert Wynne .... has opened his story very well and the characters are well enough drawn to militate against the artificial nature of the plot, whose machinery is apt to creak at times."
