= By Berwin Banks =

1920 British film by Sidney Morgan

- Directed by: Sidney Morgan
- Written by: Hugh Croise; Allen Raine
- Starring: Langhorn Burton; Eileen Magrath; J. Denton-Thompson; Charles W. Somerset
- Release date: 1920
- Country: United Kingdom

By Berwin Banks is a 1920 British silent romance film directed by Sidney Morgan and starring Langhorn Burton, Eileen Magrath and J. Denton-Thompson. The story is adapted from Allen Raine's novel By Berwen Banks (1899).

== Cast ==
- Langhorn Burton - Cardo Wynne
- Eileen Magrath - Valmai Powell
- J. Denton-Thompson - Owen Davies
- Charles W. Somerset - Essec Powell
- Arthur Lennard - Reverend Menrig Wynne
- Judd Green - Joe Powell
- Charles Levey - Reverend Gwynne Ellis
