= Bruce Gordon (actor/director) =

South African actor and director

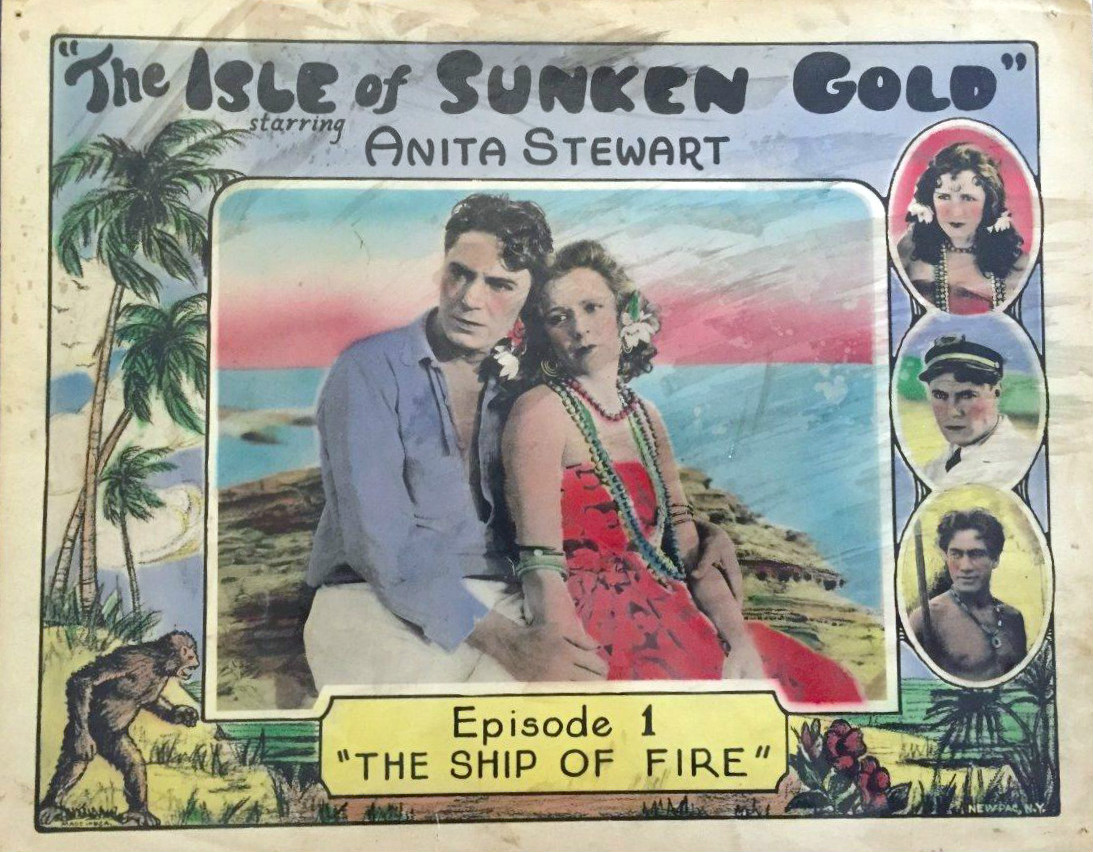
- Lobby card with Bruce Gordon and Anita Stewart in Isle of Sunken Gold (1927)
- Born: Johannesburg, South Africa, South Africa
- Occupation: Actor

Bruce Gordon was an actor who appeared in and directed the 1919 film The First Men in the Moon.

He was born in Johannesburg, South Africa.

== Partial filmography ==
- Democracy (1918)
- All Men Are Liars (1919)
- After Many Days (1919)
- The First Men in the Moon (1919)
- The Forbidden Valley (1920)
- Bring Him In (1921)
- The Timber Queen (1922)
- Kentucky Days (1923)
- Let's Go (1923)
- Ruth of the Range (1923 serial)
- The Fortieth Door (1924)
- The Fatal Mistake (1924)
- Judgment of the Storm (1924)
- Tainted Money (1924)
- Midnight Molly (1925)
- Smooth as Satin (1925)
- Three of a Kind (1925)
- The Vanishing American (1925)
- Brand of Cowardice (1925)
- Gold and the Girl (1925)
- Beyond the Rockies (1926)
- The Speed Limit (1926)
- The Escape (1926)
- Born to the West (1926)
- The Dangerous Dude (1926)
- Bucking the Truth (1926)
- Moran of the Mounted (1926)
- Pals in Paradise (1926)
- Stick to Your Story (1926)
- Blazing Days (1927)
- Desert Dust (1927)
- Isle of Sunken Gold (1927)
- The Sonora Kid (1927)
- Under the Tonto Rim (1928)
- Anybody Here Seen Kelly? (1928)
- The Tiger's Shadow (1928)
- The Fire Detective (1929)
- The Clean Up (1929)
- Elephant Boy (1937)
- Song of the Forge (1937)
