= Calvary (1920 film) =

1920 British film by Edwin J. Collins

- Directed by: Edwin J. Collins
- Written by: W. Courtney Rowden
- Produced by: H.B. Parkinson
- Starring: Malvina Longfellow; Henry Victor; Charles Vane
- Production company: Master Films
- Distributed by: British Exhibitors' Films
- Release date: February 1920
- Country: United Kingdom
- Languages: Silent; English intertitles

Calvary is a 1920 British silent drama film directed by Edwin J. Collins and starring Malvina Longfellow, Henry Victor and Charles Vane.

== Cast ==
- Malvina Longfellow as Lady Pamela Stevenage
- Henry Victor as David Penryn
- Charles Vane as Lord Stevenage
- Dorothy Moody as Ruth Penryn
- Wallace Bosco as Reuben Leaffel
- James F. Henry as Stephen Ormiston
- Barbara Everest as Rachel Penryn
- E.F. Wallace as Mr. Penryn
- George Goodwin as Squire Craddock

== Bibliography ==
- Palmer, Scott. British Film Actors' Credits, 1895-1987. McFarland, 1998.
