= The Grip of Iron =

1920 film directed by Bert Haldane

- Directed by: Bert Haldane
- Written by: Adolphe Belot (novel); Arthur Shirley (play)
- Produced by: G.B. Samuelson
- Starring: George Foley; Malvina Longfellow; James Lindsay
- Production company: Famous Pictures
- Distributed by: GFD
- Release date: January 1920
- Country: United Kingdom
- Languages: Silent; English intertitles

The Grip of Iron is a 1920 British silent crime film directed by Bert Haldane and starring George Foley, Malvina Longfellow and James Lindsay. It was based on a play of the same title by Arthur Shirley, which was in turn based on a novel by Adolphe Belot. A Parisian lawyer's clerk robs and strangles a series of victims in order to fund his daughter's extravagant lifestyle.

== Cast ==
- George Foley as Jagon / Simonnet
- Malvina Longfellow as Cora Jager
- James Lindsay as Lorenz de Rifas
- Laurence Tessier as Paul Blanchard
- Ronald Power as Captain Guerin
- Ivy King as Marie Guerin
- Warwick Buckland as Rolf De Belfort
- John Power as Coucou
- Moore Marriott as Smiler

== Bibliography ==
- Low, Rachael. History of the British Film, 1918-1929. George Allen & Unwin, 1971.
