= The First Men in the Moon (1919 film) =

Lost British science fiction film by Bruce Gordon

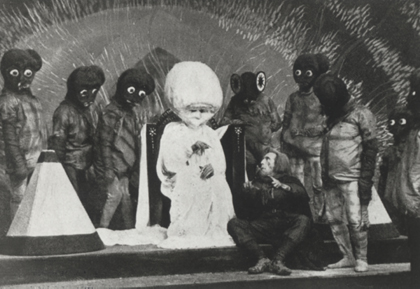
- The British film The First Men in the Moon (1919), adapted from H. G. Wells' novel of the same name, was the first science-fiction full-length movie but is currently deemed lost.
- Directed by: Bruce Gordon; J.L.V. Leigh
- Written by: R. Byron Webber; H.G. Wells (novel)
- Starring: Bruce Gordon; Heather Thatcher; Lionel d'Aragon
- Distributed by: Gaumont British (UK)
- Release date: 1919
- Country: United Kingdom
- Language: English intertitles

The First Men in the Moon is a 1919 black-and-white silent film, directed by Bruce Gordon and J.L.V. Leigh. The film was based on H.G. Wells' 1901 science fiction novel The First Men in the Moon.

As of August 2026, the film is not held in the BFI National Archive and is listed on the British Film Institute's "75 Most Wanted" list of lost films. Stills from the production and a plot synopsis exist.

== Plot ==
The synopsis from The Bioscope trade paper of 5 June 1919 reads as follows:

In the company of Rupert Bedford, a grasping speculator, Samson Cavor, an elderly inventor-scientist, ascends to the Moon in a sphere coated with 'Cavorite', a substance which has the property of neutralizing the law of gravity. After strange adventures with the 'Selenites' (the inhabitants of the Moon), Bedford villainously deserts the professor and returns to Earth alone in order to make a fortune for himself out of Cavorite. By means of wireless telegraphy, however, Hogben, a young engineer in love with Cavor's niece, Susan, succeeds in getting in touch with the stranded inventor, who denounces Bedford and states that he has been amicably received by the Grand Lunar, overlord of the Selenites. Susan thereupon indignantly rejects the proposals of Bedford, who has represented it as Cavor's last wish that she should marry him, and, instead, accepts Hogben as her husband.

== Notability ==
Robert Godwin credits the film as "the first movie to ever be based entirely on a famous science fiction novel." Frankenstein, a loose adaptation of Mary Shelley's 1818 eponymous novel, however, had appeared in 1910, with a running time of 14 minutes, and Universal Pictures released a full-length feature film of Jules Verne's 1870 novel Twenty Thousand Leagues Under the Seas in 1916.

== Cast ==
- Bruce Gordon as Hogben
- Heather Thatcher as Susan
- Hector Abbas as Sampson Cavor
- Lionel d'Aragon as Rupert Bedford
- Cecil Morton York as Grand Lunar

== See also ==
- List of lost films
