= Little Dorrit (1920 film) =

1920 film

- Directed by: Sidney Morgan
- Written by: Charles Dickens (novel); Sidney Morgan
- Produced by: Frank E. Spring
- Starring: Lady Tree; Langhorn Burton; Joan Morgan; George Foley
- Production company: Progress Films
- Distributed by: Butcher's Film Service
- Release date: August 1920
- Running time: 18 minutes (surviving fragment)
- Country: United Kingdom
- Languages: Silent; English intertitles

Little Dorrit is a lost 1920 British silent historical drama film directed by Sidney Morgan and starring Lady Tree, Langhorn Burton and Joan Morgan. It is based on the 1857 Charles Dickens' novel of the same name. A few fragments totaling 18 minutes survive, and are featured in the documentary Cinema Europe: The Other Hollywood. They've also been uploaded to YouTube.

The film tells the story of Amy Dorrit, who spends her days earning money for the family and looking after her proud father, who is a long term inmate of Marshalsea debtors' prison in London. Amy and her family's world is transformed when her boss's son, Arthur Clennam, returns from overseas to solve his family's mysterious legacy and discovers that their lives are interlinked.

== Cast ==
- Lady Tree as Mrs. Clenman
- Langhorn Burton as Arthur Clenman
- Joan Morgan as Amy Dorrit
- Compton Coutts as Pancks
- Arthur Lennard as William Dorrit
- J. Denton-Thompson as John Chivers
- George Foley as Merdle
- George Bellamy as Fred Dorrit
- Arthur Walcott as Flintwick
- Judd Green as Old Bob
- Betty Doyle as Fanny Dorrit
- Mary Lyle as Mrs. Merdle

== Bibliography ==
- Low, Rachael. The History of the British Film 1918-1929. George Allen & Unwin, 1971.
