= George Foley (actor) =

British actor

- Born: Unknown
- Died: Unknown
- Occupation: Actor

George Foley was a British actor of the silent era.

== Selected filmography ==
- The Battle of Waterloo (1913)
- Jobson's Luck (1913)
- The Life of Shakespeare (1914)
- The King's Romance (1914)
- The Woman Who Did (1915)
- A London Flat Mystery (1915)
- The Price He Paid (1916)
- The Answer (1916)
- Beau Brocade (1916)
- A Gamble for Love (1917)
- Drink (1917)
- The Snare (1918)
- A Sheffield Blade (1918)
- The Ticket-of-Leave Man (1918)
- Because (1918)
- The Odds Against Her (1919)
- The Grip of Iron (1920)
- Mary Latimer, Nun (1920)
- Little Dorrit (1920)
- Trent's Last Case (1920)
- Vi of Smith's Alley (1921)
- A Lowland Cinderella (1921)
- The Penniless Millionaire (1921)
- A Romance of Old Baghdad (1922)
- In the Blood (1923)
- A Couple of Down and Outs (1923)
- Love and Hate (1924)
- A Romance of Mayfair (1925)
- Stranger than Fiction (1930)
