= Possession (1922 film) =

1922 film directed by Louis Mercanton

- 1921 image accompanying article about Phroso; Malvina Longfellow as the heroine, Louis Mercanton director, Reginald Owen hero
- Directed by: Louis Mercanton
- Written by: Anthony Hope (novel)
- Starring: Malvina Longfellow; Reginald Owen; Max Maxudian
- Cinematography: Wladimir
- Production company: Films Louis Mercanton
- Distributed by: Etablissements Louis Aubert
- Release date: 13 January 1922
- Countries: France; United Kingdom
- Languages: Silent; French intertitles

Possession or Phroso is a 1922 British-French silent drama film directed by Louis Mercanton and starring Malvina Longfellow, Reginald Owen and Max Maxudian. It is based on the 1897 novel Phroso: A Romance by Anthony Hope.

== Plot ==
As described in a film magazine, Lord Wheatley (Owen) purchases an island off Turkey and under Turkish rule. Upon arrival, he finds the natives bitterly opposed to his taking possession. They plan to install a young woman, Phroso (Longfellow), as dictator. Several fights occur between the islanders and Wheatley's servants. Mouraki Pacha (Maxudian) arrives and quells the natives, but covets Phroso. Wheatley rescues Phroso from Constantine Stephanopoulos (Capellani), who wants to marry her, but the Turkish governor threatens him with execution if he does not surrender her to him. They escape using a secret passageway but again fall into the Turkish ruler's clutches. However, an islander with a grievance against Mouraki Pacha stabs him and helps the pair to escape in their yacht.

== Cast ==
- Malvina Longfellow as Phroso
- Reginald Owen as Lord Wheatley
- Max Maxudian as Mouraki Pacha
- Paul Capellani as Constantine Stephanopoulos
- Jeanne Desclos as Poupa Cassieri
- Charles Vanel as Dimitri
- Raoul Paoli as Kortes
- Louis Monfils as Stephan
- Harrison Brown
- Paul Menant
- Paul Numa

== Bibliography ==
- Dayna Oscherwitz & MaryEllen Higgins. The A to Z of French Cinema. Scarecrow Press, 2009.
