= Alice Russon =

Irish actress, singer, and dancer

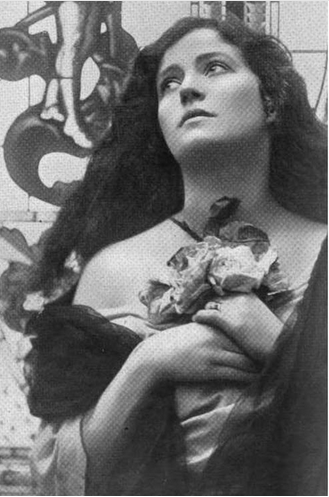
- Born: Alice Ellen Russon (or O'Connor); Dublin, Ireland
- Occupation: Actress
- Years active: 1904 - 1920

Alice Ellen Russon was an Irish actress, singer, and dancer in musical comedies and in silent films.

== Early life ==
Alice Russon was born Alice Ellen Russon (or O'Connor) in Dublin.

== Career ==
On stage, Russon appeared in The Girl from Kay's (1904), Cinderella (1907), The Belle of Mayfair (1907), Mr. George (1907), Little Red Riding Hood (1908), The Arcadians (1911), Ready Money (1912-1913), Something Simple (1916), and Anthony in Wonderland (1917). She was on a variety show bill with Will Rogers headlining, at the Palace Theatre in Oklahoma in 1906. In 1912 and 1913, she was in Australia, where she starred in a pantomime show, Puss in Boots, in Melbourne. A reviewer in Atlanta, Georgia in 1910 described her as "one of the daintiest and most winsome little women who ever trod the land that lies beyond the footlights in Atlanta."

In 1911, while working in San Francisco, California, she submitted a proposal for a "theatorium" at the Panama–Pacific International Exposition to be held in that city in 1915.

British silent films featuring Alice Russon include All Men Are Liars (1919), After Many Days (1918) and Democracy (1918).

== Personal life ==
She married a fellow actor, Vernon Davidson, in 1907. They had at least one child by 1913, a son. She owned a camera and enjoyed taking photos when she was travelling for work.
