= The Woman of the Iron Bracelets =

1920 film

- Directed by: Sidney Morgan
- Written by: Sidney Morgan
- Produced by: Frank E. Spring
- Starring: Eve Balfour; George Keene; Marguerite Blanche; George Bellamy
- Production company: Progress Films
- Distributed by: Butcher's Film Service
- Release date: September 1920
- Country: United Kingdom
- Languages: Silent; English intertitles

The Woman of the Iron Bracelets is a 1920 British silent crime film directed by Sidney Morgan and starring Eve Balfour, George Keene and Marguerite Blanche.

== Plot ==
A fleeing young woman facing a murder charge, goes to the assistance of a young man who is being cheated out of his inheritance by his stepfather. The iron bracelets of the title refer to her handcuffs.

== Cast ==
- Eve Balfour as Noah Berwell
- George Keene as Harry St. John
- Marguerite Blanche as Olive St. John
- George Bellamy as Dr. Harvey
- Arthur Walcott as Mr. Lawson
- Alice De Winton as Mrs. Lawson

== Bibliography ==
- Low, Rachael. The History of the British Film 1918-1929. George Allen & Unwin, 1971.
