= A Fowl Proceeding =

1925 film directed by Leslie S. Hiscott

- Directed by: Leslie S. Hiscott
- Written by: Thomas le Breton
- Based on: characters created by John le Breton
- Produced by: George A. Cooper
- Starring: Sydney Fairbrother; Irene Tripod
- Production company: Quality Plays
- Distributed by: F.B.O.
- Release date: January 1925 (UK)
- Running time: 2 reels
- Country: United Kingdom
- Language: Silent (English intertitles)

A Fowl Proceeding is a 1925 British silent short comedy film directed by Leslie S. Hiscott and featuring Sydney Fairbrother and Irene Tripod.

== Cast ==
- Sydney Fairbrother as Mrs. May
- Irene Tripod as Mrs. McMull
