= The Chinese Puzzle (1919 film) =

1919 British film by Fred Goodwins

- Directed by: Fred Goodwins
- Written by: Leon M. Lion (play); Marion Bower (play); Fred Goodwins
- Starring: Leon M. Lion; Lilian Braithwaite; Milton Rosmer; Sybil Arundale
- Production company: Ideal Film Company
- Distributed by: Ideal Film Company
- Release date: 1919
- Country: United Kingdom
- Language: English

The Chinese Puzzle is a 1919 British silent crime film directed by Fred Goodwins and starring Leon M. Lion, Lilian Braithwaite and Milton Rosmer. It was an adaptation of the play The Chinese Puzzle written by Lion and Marion Bower.

== Plot ==
A Mandarin takes the blame when the wife of his friend's son steals secret papers.

== Cast ==
- Leon M. Lion as Marquis Li Chung
- Lilian Braithwaite⁣ as Lady de la Haye
- Milton Rosmer as Sir Roger de la Haye
- Sybil Arundale as Naomi Melsham
- Dora De Winton as Mrs Melsham
- Charles Rock as Sir Aylmer Brent
- Reginald Bach as Henrik Stroom
- Sam Livesey as Paul Markatel
- Alexander Sarner as Raoul d'Armand
