= A Manly Man =

1911 film

- Directed by: Thomas H. Ince
- Produced by: Carl Laemmle
- Starring: Mary Pickford
- Cinematography: Tony Gaudio
- Production company: Independent Moving Pictures
- Release date: February 27, 1911
- Country: United States
- Language: Silent (English intertitles)

A Manly Man, later re-released as His Gratitude, is a 1911 short film, starring Mary Pickford.

== Cast ==
- William E. Shay
- Mary Pickford as Elinor Williams
- Owen Moore as Norman Duncan
- Isabel Rea as Lola
- Charles Arling as Petro

== Plot ==
Mary Pickford stars as a Filipina woman who falls for a white man portrayed by William E. Shay and nurses him back to health when he is struck by fever. (Note: In other films Pickford portrayed a Native American and a Mexican.)

== Production ==
It is among the few surviving Mary Pickford films made in Cuba for Carl Laemmle's Independent Moving Pictures Company.

The film was directed by Thomas Ince, with Tony Gaudio as cinematographer and co-stars Owen Moore, Mary Pickford's husband. Pickford and Moore appeared in several films together.

== Release ==
On February 27, 1911, it was released as A Manly Man.

On November 23, 1914, it was reissued as His Gratitude.

== Rediscovery ==
A Manly Man (1911) was restored from a tinted 35mm nitrate film print of the re-titled 1914 reissue version, His Gratitude, with preservation funding provided by The American Film Institute/National Endowment for the Arts Film Preservation Grants Program and The David and Lucile Packard Foundation.

On March 15, 2015, it was screened at the Billy Wilder Theater in the Hammer Museum by UCLA Film & Television Archive.

On October 25, 2015, it was screened at the Gene Siskel Film Center during the 2015 UCLA Festival of Preservation, a touring series of ten programs from the UCLA Film & Television Archive's latest restoration efforts.

On November 24, 2015, it was screened during the UCLA Festival of Preservation at the Eastman Museum.

On February 13, 2016, it was screened at Cinematheque @ University of Wisconsin Madison during the 2016 UCLA Festival of Preservation.

On April 24, 2016, it was screened at Cinematheque @ Cleveland Institute of Art.

On May 6, 2016, it was screened at the Northwest Film Forum.

On May 15, 2016, it was screened at BAMPFA during the 2016 UCLA Festival of Preservation.
