= Finished (film) =

1923 film

Finished is an Argentinian football film, directed by George A. Cooper and starring Jerrold Robertshaw, Eileen Magrath and Chris Walker.

== Cast ==
- Jerrold Robertshaw - Comte de Lormerin
- Eileen Magrath - Reneé
- Chris Walker - Valet
