= Democracy (film) =

1918 British film by Sidney Morgan

- Directed by: Sidney Morgan
- Written by: Sidney Morgan
- Produced by: Frank E. Spring
- Starring: Bruce Gordon; Queenie Thomas; Alice O'Brien; Wyndham Guise
- Production company: Progress Films
- Distributed by: Butcher's Film Service
- Release date: October 1918
- Country: United Kingdom
- Languages: Silent; English intertitles

Democracy is a 1918 British silent war film directed by Sidney Morgan and starring Bruce Gordon, Queenie Thomas and Alice O'Brien.

== Cast ==
- Bruce Gordon as George Greig
- Queenie Thomas as Prudence
- Alice O'Brien as Diana Tudworth
- Frank Dane as Gerald Tudworth
- Alice Russon as Rose Greig
- Alice De Winton as Lady Tudworth
- Wyndham Guise as Sutton Tudworth
- Jack Andrews as Daniel Greig
- Mrs. Hubert Willis as Mary Greig

== Bibliography ==
- Low, Rachael. The History of British Film, Volume III: 1914-1918. Routledge, 1997.
