= Kinsey Peile =

British actor and playwright (1861–1934)

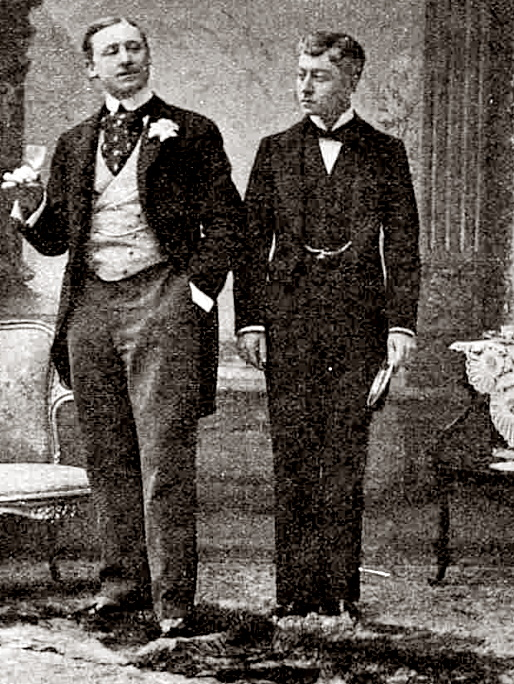
Peile, right, as Lane with Allan Aynesworth as Algernon in the premiere of The Importance of Being Earnest, 1895

Frederick Kinsey Oman Peile (20 December 1861 (Note: In his entry in Who's Who in the Theatre Peile deducted a year from his age, giving the year of his birth as 1862, but the official documentation accessible via Ancestry UK is clear that 1861 is correct.) –13 April 1934), known professionally as F. Kinsey Peile or Kinsey Peile, was a British actor and playwright. During a forty-year stage career he created roles in plays by Oscar Wilde and Noël Coward, starred in others by Henrik Ibsen and Somerset Maugham, wrote ten plays for the West End and appeared in several films.

== Life and career ==
=== Early years ===
Peile was born in Allahabad, India on 20 December 1862, the second son of a British army officer, General Frederick Weston Peile (1828–1902), and his wife Sarah, née Oman (1829–1912). He was educated in Wimbledon, London and was commissioned as a lieutenant, first in the Queen's Royal Regiment (West Surrey) and then in the Welch Regiment. In 1886 he married Marion Kerr. They had one daughter. While still an army officer Peile appeared as an amateur in a charity show at the Opera Comique, London, in 1890. Difficulty in finding married quarters when the regiment was posted to Ireland led him to resign his commission, but he maintained his association with the military, serving in the Post Office Rifles.

=== Actor ===
The Belle of Cairo (1896): music and lyrics by Peile

Caricature by Max Beerbohm of Peile as adapter of Rudyard Kipling (1903) (Note: Beerbohm's caption for the caricature is "Mr Kinsey Peile, Adapter of 'The Man Who Was' – And Mr Rudyard Kipling, the Author of the Little Tale")

Peile left the army and made his professional stage debut in 1892 at the Prince of Wales's Theatre, as the White Admiral in Blue Eyed Susan. He joined the company of the actor-manager George Alexander, first on tour and then at its London base, the St James's Theatre, appearing in Liberty Hall and other productions, including the premiere of The Importance of Being Earnest, in which he created the role of Lane.

After some years' absence from the stage, during which he took up writing, Peile reappeared in 1908, when he toured with May Palfrey, as Blenkinsopp in Somerset Maugham's Mrs Dot. At the Garrick in 1910 he played in Dame Nature; at the Strand in 1910 he was in The Man from Mexico and at the Royalty in 1911 he appeared in The Career of Nablotsky. In what The Times singled out as one of his most important roles, in 1911 at the Kingsway he played George Tesman in Hedda Gabler. On the outbreak of the First World War in 1914, though over fifty, he successfully sought a commission as a lieutenant in his old regiment, resuming his stage career in 1918.

Peile's post-war roles included Otho in the Čapeks' The Insect Play in 1923, alongside the young John Gielgud, Pauncefort Quentin in Noël Coward's The Vortex (1924), (Note: Peile shared with Irene Vanbrugh the distinction of creating roles in plays by both Wilde and Coward: Vanbrugh, like Peile, appeared in the original production of The Importance of Being Earnest, and she was in the premiere of Coward's Operette in 1938.) and Richard Twining in Maugham's The Moon and Sixpence (1925). His final stage roles were Lord Cossington in a political satire, Wings Over Europe, at the Globe in 1932, and the Duke of York in Gielgud's production of Richard of Bordeaux at the New Theatre in 1933.

=== Writer and later years ===
In addition to acting, Peile was a playwright. His works written for the West End included Solomon's Twins, 1897; An Interrupted Honeymoon, 1899; Lyre and Lancet, 1902; The Man Who Was, 1903; Money and the Girl, 1910; Bill, Twelve o'clock, and The Shooting Star, all 1912; The Pink Nightgown, 1913; and Who Laughs Last, 1919. He wrote the music and lyrics for The Belle of Cairo (1896), a musical comedy with a book by Cecil Raleigh, starring May Yohé and Giulia Warwick.

In the view of The Era, Peile was best known for his adaptation of Rudyard Kipling's story "The Man Who Was", which Herbert Beerbohm Tree mounted with considerable success at His Majesty's in 1903 and revived frequently. (Note: After seeing Tree in the piece, Sarah Bernhardt asked Peile to adapt another Kipling story for her to star in, but Kipling vetoed the proposal, unwilling to see "that imperious and absorbing personality ranging at large among his stories".) Also for Tree, Peile adapted Robert Louis Stevenson's story "The Door upon the Latch". He collaborated in the 1920s with Algernon Blackwood on several projects, including a three-act farce and a ballet based on Blackwood's story "The Wings of Horus", neither of which reached the stage.

Peile appeared in films, including The Face at the Window (1920), Three Live Ghosts (1922), The Presumption of Stanley Hay, MP (1925), Settled Out of Court (1926), The Vortex (1928), The Burgomaster of Stilemonde (1929) and High Society (1932).

Peile died in London on 13 April 1934, aged 72, survived by his widow and daughter.

== Notes, references and sources ==
=== Sources ===
- Ashley, Michael (2001). Starlight Man: The extraordinary life of Algernon Blackwood. London: Constable. ISBN 978-1-84119-417-2.
- Mander, Raymond; Joe Mitchenson (2000) [1957]. Barry Day and Sheridan Morley (ed.). Theatrical Companion to Coward (Second ed.). London: Oberon Books. ISBN 978-1-84002-054-0.
- Parker, John; Freda Gaye; Ian Herbert (1978). Who Was Who in the Theatre. Detroit: Gale Research. OCLC 310466458.
- Trewin, J. C. (1967). "Kipling and the Theatre". In Martin Holems (ed.). Essays and Studies, 1967. London: John Murray. OCLC 5885002.
