= Henry Baynton =

British Shakespearean actor and actor-manager (1892–1951)

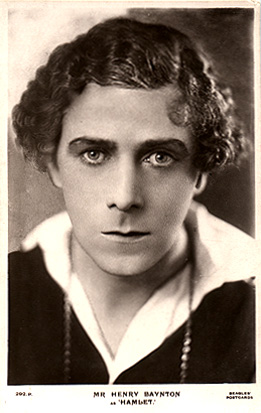
Henry Baynton as Hamlet c. 1917

Henry Baynton (23 September 1892 in Moseley in Warwickshire, England – 2 January 1951 in London) was a British Shakespearean actor and actor-manager of the early 20th century who in a stage career lasting 40 years is credited with playing Hamlet over 2,000 times.

Henry Howard Baynton was the oldest of four sons born to Charles Sommers Baynton (1867–1926) and Eleanor Rowton (1870–1944). He made his first theatrical appearance in 1910, commencing a career in which he played in most of the works of William Shakespeare. He joined the company of Oscar Asche in 1911, and later that year joined the company of Frank Benson, for whom he appeared as Hamlet and as Demetrius in A Midsummer Night's Dream (1915). During World War I he briefly enlisted in the Inns of Court O.T.C in January 1916 but having "a marked deformity of the toes since birth making marching impossible" he was discharged in May 1916 as "not being likely to become an efficient soldier (on medical grounds)."

In 1916 Baynton appeared at the Stratford Festival, and in 1917 he joined the theatrical company of H.B. Irving at the Savoy Theatre, playing Laertes to Irving's Hamlet.

In 1920 Baynton formed his own theatrical company, with whom he played Orlando in As You Like It, Romeo in Romeo and Juliet, Shylock in The Merchant of Venice, Brutus in Julius Caesar, the title roles in Henry V, Richard III, Hamlet, King Lear and Othello, Bottom in A Midsummer Night's Dream Falstaff, and Petruchio in The Taming of the Shrew. In 1922 the company was taken over by Robert Courtneidge from when Baynton was paid a salary of £50 a week plus a share of the profits. He played the Burgomaster Mathias in The Bells at the Savoy Theatre in 1924 with the scenery from the original production staged by Henry Irving. Baynton's performance was not favourably received by the critics, who compared him adversely to Henry Irving, who had made the role his own.

Baynton toured the provinces between 1926 and 1930 appearing in the works of Shakespeare and various other plays. Baynton went into partnership to regain control of the company but the venture failed with Baynton losing between £3,000 and £4,000. He was made bankrupt and was forced to disband his theatrical company in 1930, making him among the last of the actor-managers. He was then reduced to giving acting and elocution lessons in Birmingham, earning about £3 a week. In 1932 he was engaged to Phyllis Tibbetts. In 1933 he married Alice Mabel Rocke Jackson née Stevens (1869–1952), widow of William James Jackson (1841-1931), a barrister at the Calcutta Bar; Baynton had known the couple for 18 years before the marriage.

Baynton appeared in the 1917 film Auld Lang Syne. His final appearance in a Shakespearean role was in 1934 when he played Capulet in Romeo and Juliet.

He died in London in 1951 aged 58.
