= The Lonely Lady of Grosvenor Square =

1922 film

The Lonely Lady of Grosvenor Square is a 1922 British silent romance film directed by Sinclair Hill and starring Betty Faire, Jack Hobbs and Eileen Magrath.

== Cast ==
- Betty Faire - Jeanne Marney
- Jack Hobbs - Duke of Monaghan
- Eileen Magrath - Cissie
- Dorothy Fane - Anne-Marie Marney
- Arthur Pusey - Louis Marney
- Gertrude Sterroll - Miss Marney
- Ralph Forster - Butler
- Mrs. Hubert Willis - Dunham
- Daisy Campbell - Duchess
- Emily Nichol - Mrs. Wheeler
