= David Skaats Foster =

US businessman and author (1852–1920)

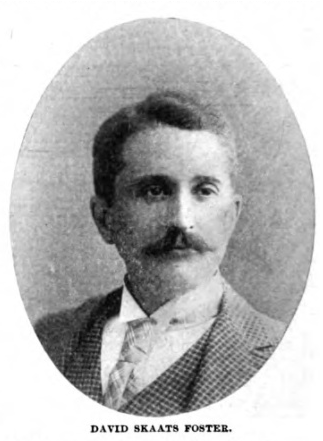
David Skaats Foster

David Skaats Foster (January 26, 1852 – June 23, 1920) was an American novelist, poet, playwright, and merchant. One of his novels was adapted into The Road to London.

== Early life ==
Foster was born in Utica, New York on January 26, 1852. He was the son of Eliza P. Skaats and Thomas Foster. His father "was prominent in railroad building", was a merchant, and was vice president of the Utica City National Bank. Foster was educated in the common schools of Utica. Foster was a linguist who could speak and read in English, French, Italian, German, and Spanish.

== Career ==
Foster was the head of David S. Foster Sons & Company, a hardware firm in Syracuse, New York. He was also a coal and iron merchant.

He wrote poetry and novels. Some of his best-known works were Casanova the Courier; Ellinor Fenton, an Andirondack Story; Mademoiselle of Cambrai; The Road to London; The Divided Medal; The Kidnapped Damozel; Flighty Arethusa; The Benevolent Bandits; Spanish Castles by the Rhine, and The Lady of Castle Queer. He also wrote dective stories that were syndicated in American newspapers by the Irving Batcheler Syndicate.

His book Rebecca the Witch: And Other Tales in Metre was adapted into the play, The Witch. His 1914 novel, The Road to London, was adapted into a film in 1921. He also wrote the play Wanted, A Wife which was produced with Roland Reed as the lead.

== Personal life ==
In 1874, Foster married Mary C. Williams. They had two sons, Gerard S. Foster and Bernard D. Foster. The family lived in Utica. His wife died in 1895.

Around 1910, Foster moved to 209 West Beard Avenue in Syracuse, New York. He also had a summer home in Los Angeles, California.

Foster died on June 23, 1920, at his home in Syracuse.

== Selected publication ==
- The Romance of the Unexpected. New York: G. P. Putnam's Sons, 1887.
- Rebecca the Witch: And Other Tales in Metre. New York: G. P. Putnam's Sons, 1888.
- Casanova the Courier. J. S. Ogilvie. 1892.
- Ellinor Fenton, an Andirondack Story. Philadelphia, J.B. Lippincott Company, 1893.
- Spanish Castles by the Rhine: A Triptychal Yarn. New York, Henry Holt and Company, 1897.
- Prince Timoteo. New York: F. Tennyson Neely, 1899.
- Flighty Arethusa. Philadelphia: J. B. Lippincott Company, 1910.
- The Road to London. New York: The Franklin Book Company, 1914.
- The Divided Medal. New York: The Franklin Book Company, 1914.
- Our Uncle William; Also, Nate Sawyer. New York: The Franklin Book Company, 1915.
- The Kidnapped Damozel; The Oval Diamond; Alraschid in Petticoates. New York: The Franklin Book Company, 1915.
- The Lady of Castle Queer. New York: The Franklin Book Company, 1919.
- Mademoiselle of Cambrai. New York: The Franklin Book Company, 1920.
