= The Grand Babylon Hotel (1916 film) =

- Directed by: Frank Wilson
- Written by: Arnold Bennett
- Produced by: Frank Wilson
- Starring: Fred Wright; Marguerite Blanche; Gerald Lawrence; Lionelle Howard
- Production company: Hepworth Pictures
- Distributed by: Shaftesbury Films
- Release date: August 1916
- Country: United Kingdom
- Languages: Silent; English intertitles

The Grand Babylon Hotel is a 1916 British silent thriller film directed by Frank Wilson and starring Fred Wright, Marguerite Blanche and Gerald Lawrence. It is an adaptation of the 1902 novel of the same title by Arnold Bennett.

== Synopsis ==
The daughter of an American millionaire assists a young European prince who faces being kidnapped.

== Cast ==
- Fred Wright as Theodore Racksole
- Marguerite Blanche as Nella Racksole
- Gerald Lawrence as Jules
- Lionelle Howard as Prince Eugen
- Stewart Rome as Prince Aribert
- Violet Hopson as Miss Spencer
- Alma Taylor as Princess Anna
- Charles Vane as Rocco
- Henry Vibart as King of Ragatz
- Johnny Butt as Sampson Levi

== Bibliography ==
- Goble, Alan. The Complete Index to Literary Sources in Film. Walter de Gruyter, 1999.
- Low, Rachael. The History of the British Film 1914 - 1918. George Allen & Unwin, 1950.
