= The Black Sheep (1920 film) =

1920 British film by Sidney Morgan

- Directed by: Sidney Morgan
- Written by: Sidney Morgan
- Produced by: Frank E. Spring
- Starring: Marguerite Blanche; George Keene; Eve Balfour; Arthur Lennard
- Production company: Progress Films
- Distributed by: Butcher's Film Service
- Release date: March 1920
- Country: United Kingdom
- Languages: Silent; English intertitles

The Black Sheep is a 1920 British silent romance film directed by Sidney Morgan and starring Marguerite Blanche, George Keene, Eve Balfour, and Arthur Lennard.

== Cast ==
- Marguerite Blanche as Nora Ackroyd
- George Keene as George Laxton
- Eve Balfour as Laurie Fenton
- George Bellamy as Mr. Ackroyd
- Arthur Lennard as Mr. Fenton

== Bibliography ==
- Low, Rachael. The History of the British Film 1918-1929. George Allen & Unwin, 1971.
