= Doing His Bit =

1917 British film by Edwin J. Collins

- Directed by: Edwin J. Collins
- Written by: George Robey
- Starring: George Robey; Marjorie Hume
- Production company: Ideal Film Company
- Distributed by: Ideal Film Company
- Release date: 1917
- Country: United Kingdom
- Language: English

Doing His Bit is a 1917 British silent comedy film directed by Edwin J. Collins and starring George Robey and Marjorie Hume and Howard Boddey. It was one of a number of films featuring Robey, one of the leading music hall stars of the era.

== Cast ==
- George Robey - The Man
- Marjorie Hume - The Girl
- Howard Boddey

== Bibliography ==
- St. Pierre, Paul Matthew. Music Hall Mimesis in British Film, 1895-1960. Associated University Press, 2009.
