= Malvina Longfellow =

American actress (1889–1962)

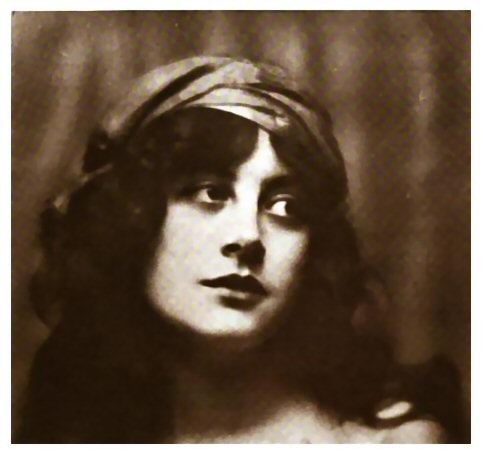
- Metropolitan magazine, May 1916
- Born: March 30, 1889; New York City, New York, US
- Died: November 2, 1962 (aged 73); London, England, UK
- Education: American Academy of Dramatic Arts
- Occupation: actress
- Spouse: Alan Percy Cunliffe (m. 1940; died 1942)

Malvina Virginia Longfellow (March 30, 1889 – November 2, 1962) was an American stage and silent movie actress of the early 20th century.

== Early life ==
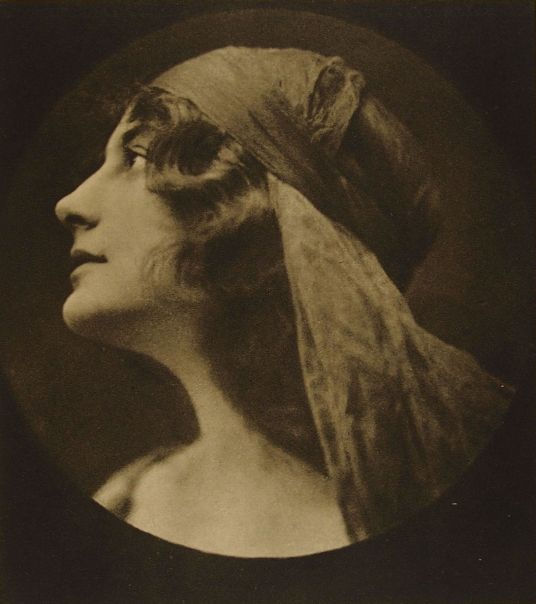
Photograph of Longfellow by E.O. Hoppé, 1922

Born in the city of New York, Malvina was the daughter of Julia Langfelder and the sister of Lilyan Cohen. She attended the American Academy of Dramatic Arts in New York City and was a member of the senior class of 1908–1909.

== Career ==
=== Stage actress ===
In December 1909 Longfellow was in The Watcher, a play with a psychic theme, staged in Baltimore, Maryland. Written by Cora Maynard, the presentation featured the actors Cathrine Countiss, Percy Haswell, Thurlow Bergen, and John Emerson. It was enacted at the Auditorium Theater, produced by the Shubert brothers. The plot is carried out in four acts and has to do with an impoverished New York family, the Kents. Their mother influences their lives after dying early in the play. In January 1910 the theatrical drama of spiritism played the Shubert Theater on 41st Street between Broadway (Manhattan) and 6th Avenue.

Longfellow was part of a program of entertainment at the Century Theatre for British-American War Relief, in January 1916. Kitty Gordon, Eleanor Painter, Eugene Ormonde, and Paul Draper were also a part of the event. By 1916 Longfellow was married to a British officer who had served in the Dardanelles for six months in 1915.

=== Film career ===
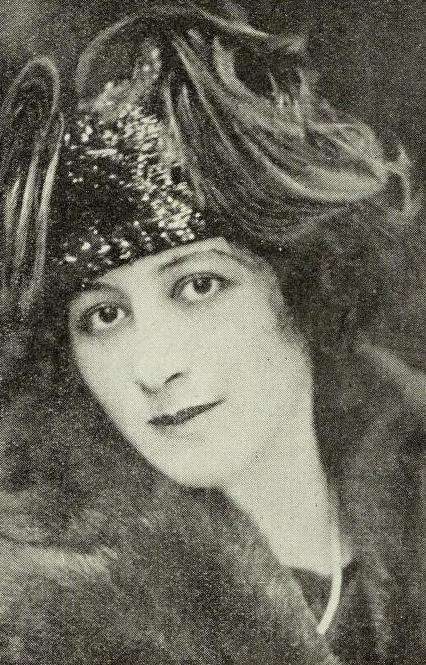
Longfellow, 1921

She was in motion pictures beginning in 1917 with a role in The Will of the People. Her many film appearances include parts in Adam Bede (1918), The Romance of Lady Hamilton (1919), Calvary (1920), Moth and Rust (1921), Possession (1922), The Wandering Jew (1923), The Indian Love Lyrics (1923), and The Celestial City (1929). German producer, Ernst Lubitsch, wanted her to make a movie about Lord Nelson in 1921. She was to star as Lady Hamilton opposite Reinhold Schünzel.

=== Court witness ===
Longfellow gave evidence to a coroner's inquest in London, England, in January 1919. The coroner's jury found Reggie de Veulle guilty of supplying British actress Billie Carleton with cocaine. Carleton had been found dead in a London hotel in December 1918, and Longfellow testified that she knew of Carleton's addiction to drugs and had tried to persuade her to stop using them. Longfellow also told the court she had asked Veulle to stop supplying Carleton with drugs and had told him on the night of Armistice Day that there "would be trouble" if he went on doing so.

=== Renowned beauty ===
In 1911, Longfellow won a prize 10,000 Francs offered by Le Matin of Paris for "the most beautiful girl on earth". She was then quoted as giving the following beauty advice. "If you want to preserve your good looks, take a bath every night. Use warm, cool or cold water and the best castile soap you can buy. During the night the machinery turns off the power, but the skin is called upon for ventilation to throw off waste and absorb fresh materials. The sleeping room cannot be properly ventilated with the doors and windows closed, nor can the human system if pores of the skin are closed. Keep the skin clean and feed it clean, fresh air. After the bath make up the face. Use clear water as hot as you can put your hands into."

E.O. Hoppé, an international beauty expert and photographer, selected Longfellow as one of the world's most beautiful women, in November 1922. An Englishman, Hoppe was quoted as saying, Of all the women in the world the English and American women are the most beautiful. The superiority of the American eyes with their joie de vivre balances the English superiority of ankles and coiffure. Others he picked were Marion Davies, Mrs. Lydig Hoyt, Lady Lavery, and Viscountess Maidstone.

In 1921 and 1922 Longfellow lent her name to a preparation called Phosferine: "Miss Malvina Longfellow writes - The travelling, concentration, and intensity, of characterisation demanded by Film, Drama and Comedy, are a very severe tax upon one’s stock of nervous vitality, and in my own case, I find Phosferine enables me to recover nerve force and energy in a very short time. It is accurate to say Phosferine is a reliable safeguard against that jaded appearance and condition which follows prolonged professional exertions..."

== Personal life ==
Longfellow's mother, Julia Langfelder died in 1938. Her funeral was conducted at the Riverside Memorial Chapel, 76th Street, and Amsterdam Avenue, New York City, on April 19. She was survived by her daughters, Longfellow and Cohen.

In the spring of 1940 Longfellow married Alan Percy Cunliffe, in Folkestone, Kent. An Old Etonian landowner and racehorse-owner, Cunliffe was the younger brother of Walter Cunliffe, 1st Baron Cunliffe, a former Governor of the Bank of England. He died in September 1942, aged 77, when his address was stated as Castle Close, Sandgate, Kent. He left assets of £154,669.

Longfellow died at Westminster Hospital, London, on 2 November 1962. At the time of her death she was still a widow and was living in a flat in South Street, Mayfair, London SW1. She left an estate valued at £371,270, a fairly substantial fortune in 1962.

== Selected filmography ==
- Adam Bede (1918)
- Nelson (1918)
- Thelma (1918)
- The Romance of Lady Hamilton (1919)
- Mary Latimer, Nun (1920)
- Unmarried (1920)
- The Grip of Iron (1920)
- Calvary (1920)
- The Night Hawk (1921)
- Moth and Rust (1921)
- Possession (1922)
- The Indian Love Lyrics (1923)
- The Celestial City (1929)
