= A Cinema Girl's Romance =

1915 British film by George Pearson

- Directed by: George Pearson
- Written by: Ladbroke Black (novel); Harry Engholm
- Starring: Agnes Glynne; Fred Paul; Alice De Winton
- Production company: G.B. Samuelson Productions
- Distributed by: Royal Film Distributors
- Release date: February 1915
- Country: United Kingdom
- Languages: Silent; English intertitles

A Cinema Girl's Romance is a 1915 British silent drama film directed by George Pearson and starring Agnes Glynne, Fred Paul and Alice De Winton. It was based on a novel by Ladbroke Black. The film was made at Isleworth Studios.

== Cast ==
- Agnes Glynne as Hazel Wilmot
- Fred Paul as Sir Hubert Loftus
- Alice De Winton as Ruth Roland
- Bernard Vaughan
- Donald Young
- Thomas Henry Davidson as Film Agent

== Production ==
Invited by G.B. Samuelson, a party of exhibitors, renters, and press representatives were taken to Worton Hall, Isleworth Studios. Made extras, the group were guests viewing Hazel Wilmot's fictional film "The Fireman's Wedding", and are seen congratulating the agent, played by T.H. Davidson (Thomas Henry Davidson), a real film renter. Afterwords, the group were taken to see the latest G.B. Samuelson Production, The Face at the Telephone.

== Bibliography ==
- Harris, Ed. Britain's Forgotten Film Factory: The Story of Isleworth Studios. Amberley Publishing, 2013.
