= The Presumption of Stanley Hay, MP =

1925 film

- Directed by: Sinclair Hill
- Written by: Nowell Kaye (novel); Alicia Ramsey
- Starring: David Hawthorne; Betty Faire; Fred Raynham
- Production company: Stoll Pictures
- Distributed by: Stoll Pictures
- Release date: April 1925
- Country: United Kingdom
- Languages: Silent; English intertitles

The Presumption of Stanley Hay, MP is a 1925 British silent drama film directed by Sinclair Hill and starring David Hawthorne, Betty Faire, Fred Raynham and Kinsey Peile. It is adapted from a novel by Nowell Kaye.

== Cast ==
- David Hawthorne as Stanley Hay
- Betty Faire as Princess Berenice
- Fred Raynham as Baron Hertzog
- Kinsey Peile as The King
- Nelson Ramsey as The Spy
- Dora De Winton as Lady Barmouth
- Madame d'Esterre as Madame de Vere
- Eric Bransby Williams as Honorable Member

== Bibliography ==
- Low, Rachael. History of the British Film, 1918-1929. George Allen & Unwin, 1971.
