= A Friend of Cupid =

1925 film

- Directed by: Leslie S. Hiscott
- Written by: Thomas le Breton
- Produced by: George A. Cooper
- Starring: Sydney Fairbrother; Irene Tripod
- Production company: Quality Plays
- Release date: January 1925 (UK)
- Running time: 2 reels
- Country: United Kingdom
- Language: Silent (English intertitles)

A Friend of Cupid is a 1925 British silent-era short comedy film directed by Leslie S. Hiscott and featuring Sydney Fairbrother and Irene Tripod.

== Cast ==
- Sydney Fairbrother as Mrs. May
- Irene Tripod as Mrs. McMull

== Reception ==
Contemporary trade publication The Bioscope described the plot as "too far-fetched, even for a comedy, to be very amusing." The reviewer praised the performances of the supporting cast and Sydney Fairbrother, who did well "despite the poverty of the plot and the unnecessary buffoonery in which she is forced to indulge." The camerawork and sets were considered "adequate."
