= The Children of Gibeon =

1920 British film by Sidney Morgan

- Directed by: Sidney Morgan
- Written by: Walter Besant (novel); Irene Miller
- Produced by: Frank E. Spring
- Starring: Joan Morgan; Langhorn Burton; Eileen Magrath; Sydney Fairbrother
- Production company: Progress Films
- Distributed by: Butcher's Film Service
- Release date: November 1920
- Country: United Kingdom
- Languages: Silent; English intertitles

The Children of Gibeon is a 1920 British silent drama film based on a novel by Sir Walter Besant, directed by Sidney Morgan and starring Joan Morgan, Langhorn Burton and Eileen Magrath. An aristocrat adopts a criminal's daughter and brings her up with her own daughter. She never reveals to them which way round they were.

== Cast ==
- Joan Morgan as Violet
- Langhorn Burton as Clive
- Eileen Magrath as Valentine
- Sydney Fairbrother as Mrs. Gibeon
- Alice De Winton as Lady Eldridge
- Arthur Lennard as Mr. Gibeon
- Charles Cullum as Jack Conyers
- Barbara McFarlane as Violet

== Bibliography ==
- Low, Rachael. The History of the British Film 1918-1929. George Allen & Unwin, 1971.
