= The Princess of New York =

1921 film

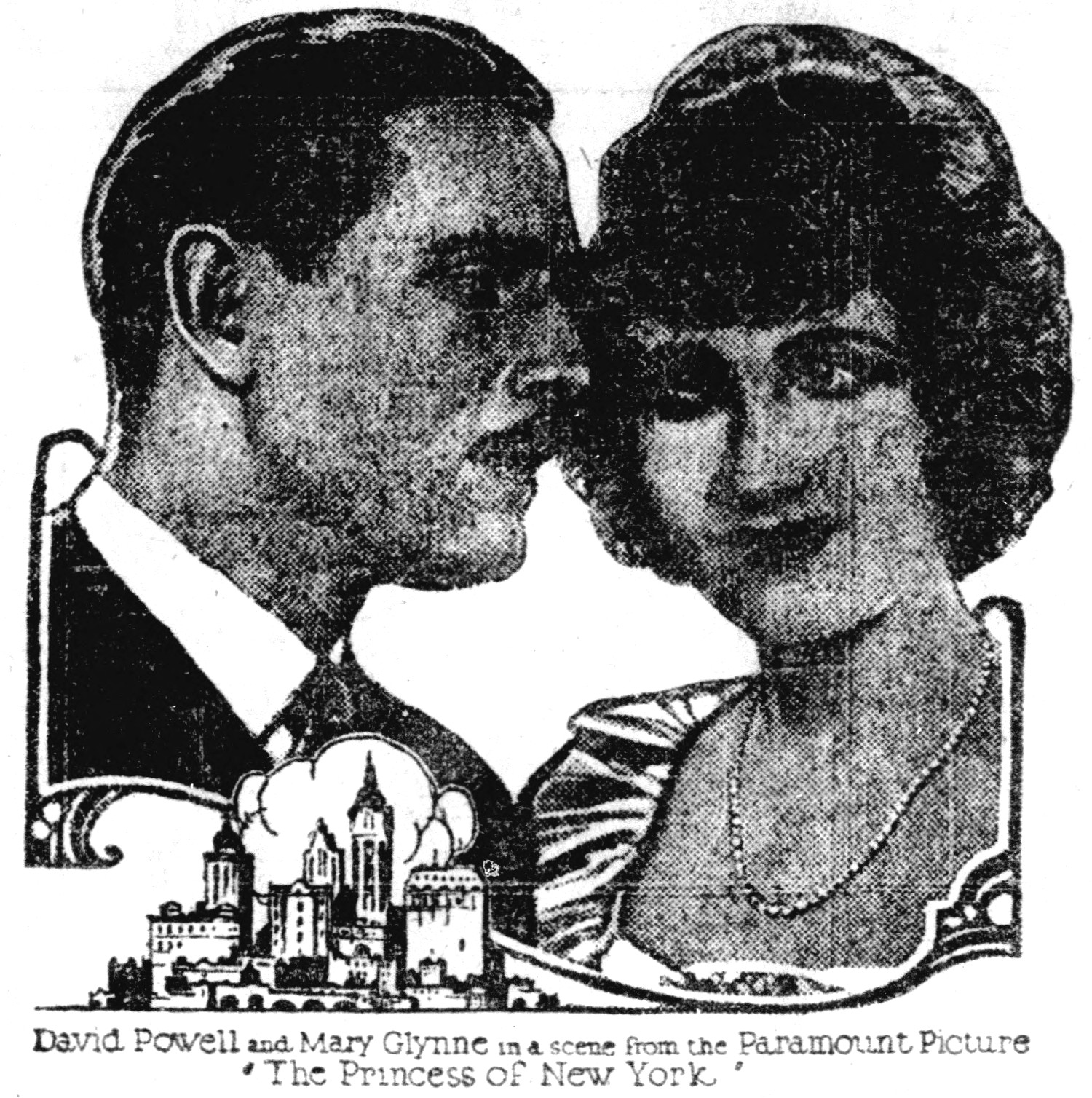
- Newspaper publicity photo
- Directed by: Donald Crisp
- Written by: Cosmo Hamilton; Margaret Turnbull
- Starring: David Powell
- Cinematography: Hal Young
- Distributed by: Famous Players–Lasky British Producers
- Release date: 7 August 1921
- Running time: 64 minutes
- Country: United Kingdom
- Language: Silent with English intertitles

The Princess of New York is a 1921 British crime film directed by Donald Crisp. Alfred Hitchcock is credited as a title designer. The film is now considered a lost film.

== Cast ==
- David Powell - Geoffrey Kingsward
- Mary Glynne - Helen Stanton
- Saba Raleigh - Mrs. Raffan
- George Bellamy - Sir George Meretham
- Dorothy Fane - Violet Meretham
- Ivo Dawson - Allan Meretham
- Philip Hewland - Colonel Kingsward
- R. Heaton Grey - Mr. Greet
- Wyndham Guise - Eardley Smith (as Windham Guise)
- Jane West - Mrs. Eardley Smith
- H. Lloyd - Moneylender
- Lionel Yorke - Reddish
- William Parry - Magistrate

== See also ==
- Alfred Hitchcock filmography
- List of lost films
