= Mary Latimer, Nun =

1920 film directed by Bert Haldane

- Directed by: Bert Haldane
- Written by: Will H. Glaze; R. Byron Webber
- Starring: Malvina Longfellow; Warwick Ward; Ethel Fisher
- Production company: Famous Pictures
- Distributed by: Famous Pictures
- Release date: March 1920
- Country: United Kingdom
- Languages: Silent; English intertitles

Mary Latimer, Nun is a 1920 British silent drama film directed by Bert Haldane and starring Malvina Longfellow, Warwick Ward and Ethel Fisher. The film is based on a novel by Eve Elwen. The screenplay concerns a girl from the slums who marries the son of an aristocrat.

== Plot summary ==
A girl from the slums marries the son of an aristocrat. When he abandons her, she makes a living as a music hall performer.

== Cast ==
- Malvina Longfellow as Mary Latimer
- Warwick Ward as Alfred Pierpoint
- Ethel Fisher as Clarice
- George Foley as Sam Tubbs
- H. Agar Lyons as Lord Pierpoint
- Moore Marriott as Dickey Stubbs
- Laurence Tessier
- Minnie Rayner

== Bibliography ==
- Goble, Alan. The Complete Index to Literary Sources in Film. Walter de Gruyter, 1999.
