= Eileen Magrath =

British actress

Eileen Magrath was a British actress.

== Selected filmography ==
- The Children of Gibeon (1920)
- The Town of Crooked Ways (1920)
- By Berwin Banks (1920)
- His Other Wife (1921)
- The Lonely Lady of Grosvenor Square (1922)
- Finished (1923)
