= The Indian Love Lyrics =

1923 film

- Directed by: Sinclair Hill
- Written by: Laurence Hope (poem); Sinclair Hill
- Starring: Catherine Calvert; Owen Nares; Malvina Longfellow
- Cinematography: D.P. Cooper
- Edited by: H. Leslie Brittain
- Production company: Stoll Pictures
- Distributed by: Stoll Pictures
- Release date: July 1923
- Country: United Kingdom
- Languages: Silent; English intertitles

The Indian Love Lyrics is a 1923 British silent romantic drama film directed by Sinclair Hill and starring Catherine Calvert, Owen Nares and Malvina Longfellow. It is based on the poem The Garden of Kama by Laurence Hope. The film's sets were designed by art director Walter Murton.

In India, a princess disguises herself as a commoner to escape an arranged marriage.

== Cast ==
- Catherine Calvert as Queen Vashti
- Owen Nares as Prince Zahindin
- Malvina Longfellow as Princess Nadira
- Shayle Gardner as Ahmed Khan
- Fred Raynham as Ibrahim-bey-Israel
- Roy Travers as Hassan Ali Khan
- William Parry as Mustapha Khan
- William Ramsey as Sultan Abdul Rahin
- Daisy Campbell as Sultana Manavour
- Fred Rains as Selim
- Pino Conti as Youssef
- Arthur McLaglen as Champion

== Bibliography ==
- Low, Rachael. History of the British Film, 1918-1929. George Allen & Unwin, 1971.
