= Gold and the Girl =

1925 film

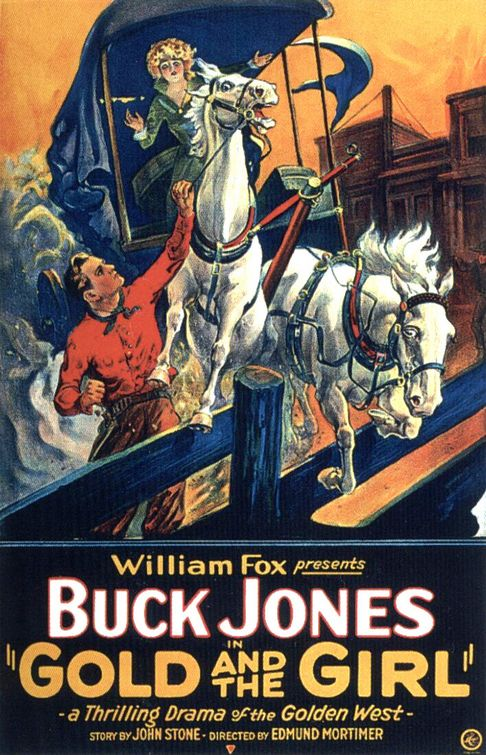
- Theatrical poster
- Directed by: Edmund Mortimer
- Written by: John Stone
- Cinematography: Allen M. Davey
- Production company: Fox Film Corporation
- Distributed by: Fox Film Corporation
- Release date: April 5, 1925
- Running time: 50 minutes
- Country: United States
- Language: Silent (English intertitles)

Gold and the Girl is a 1925 American silent Western film directed by Edmund Mortimer and starring Buck Jones, Elinor Fair, and Bruce Gordon.

== Plot ==
As described in a film magazine review, a representative of mining interests is determined to capture the crooks who are stealing the gold shipments. The villains execute the robberies by using the gold shipment trucks. The agent falls in love with the young woman whose father is the ringleader of the bandits. He effects her rescue and captures the gang but the father eludes the law by killing himself.

== Cast ==
- Buck Jones as Dan Prentiss
- Elinor Fair as Ann Donald
- Bruce Gordon as Bart Colton
- Claude Payton as Rankin
- Lucien Littlefield as Weasel
- Pal the Dog
- Alphonse Ethier
- Carole Lombard

== Bibliography ==
- Wes D. Gehring (2003). Carole Lombard, the Hoosier Tornado. Indiana Historical Society Press. ISBN 978-0-8719-5167-0
