= Lucky Ladies =

1932 film

- Directed by: John Rawlins
- Screenplay by: Randall Faye
- Produced by: Irving Asher
- Starring: Sydney Fairbrother; Emily Fitzroy; Janice Adair
- Production company: Teddington Studios
- Release date: 16 January 1932
- Running time: 74 minutes
- Country: United Kingdom
- Language: English

Lucky Ladies is a 1932 British comedy film directed by John Rawlins and starring Sydney Fairbrother, Emily Fitzroy and Tracy Holmes. It was written by Randall Faye and was made as a quota quickie.

== Preservation status ==
The British Film Institute National Archive holds a collection of stills but no film or video materials.

== Plot summary ==
Some sisters inherit a large sum of money.

== Cast ==
- Sydney Fairbrother as Angle Tuckett
- Emily Fitzroy as Cleo Honeycutt
- Tracy Holmes as Ted
- Janice Adair as Pearl
- Syd Crossley as Hector Ramsbottom
- Charles Farrell as bookmaker
