= All Men Are Liars (1919 film) =

1919 British silent film by Sidney Morgan

- Directed by: Sidney Morgan
- Written by: Joseph Hocking (novel); Sidney Morgan
- Produced by: Frank E. Spring
- Starring: Alice Russon; Bruce Gordon; Jessie Earle
- Production company: Progress Films
- Distributed by: Butcher's Film Service
- Release date: January 1919
- Country: United Kingdom
- Languages: Silent; English intertitles

All Men Are Liars is a 1919 British silent drama film directed by Sidney Morgan and starring Alice Russon, Bruce Gordon and Jessie Earle.

== Cast ==
- Alice Russon as Hope
- Bruce Gordon as Stephen
- Jessie Earle as Isobel
- George Harrington as Luke

== Bibliography ==
- Low, Rachael. The History of the British Film 1918-1929. George Allen & Unwin, 1971.
