= God and the Man =

- Directed by: Edwin J. Collins
- Written by: Eliot Stannard
- Starring: Langhorn Burton; Joyce Carey; Bert Wynne; Edith Craig
- Production company: Ideal Film Company
- Distributed by: Ideal Film Company
- Release date: 1918
- Country: United Kingdom
- Language: English

God and the Man is a 1918 British silent drama film directed by Edwin J. Collins and starring Langhorn Burton, Joyce Carey and Bert Wynne. It was adapted from an 1881 novel by Robert Buchanan.

== Cast ==
- Langhorn Burton - Christiansen
- Joyce Carey - Priscilla Sefton
- Bert Wynne - Richard Christiansen
- Edith Craig - Dame Christiansen
- Sybil Arundale - Kate Orchardson
- Henry Vibart - Mr. Sefton
- Nelson Ramsey - Squire Christiansen
- E. Vivian Reynolds - John Wesley
