= After Many Days =

1919 British silent film by Sidney Morgan

- Directed by: Sidney Morgan
- Written by: Sidney Morgan
- Produced by: Frank E. Spring
- Starring: Bruce Gordon; Alice Russon; Irene Browne
- Production company: Progress Films
- Distributed by: Butcher's Film Service
- Release date: January 1919
- Country: United Kingdom
- Languages: Silent; English intertitles

After Many Days is a 1919 British silent drama film directed by Sidney Morgan and starring Bruce Gordon, Alice Russon and Irene Browne. In the film, a girl believes that her father has had an illegitimate child with an artist's model, but discovers that it was his criminal brother.

== Cast ==
- Bruce Gordon as Paul Irving
- Alice Russon as Marion Bramleyn
- Irene Browne as Connie
- Adeline Hayden Coffin as Mrs. Irving

== Bibliography ==
- Low, Rachael. The History of the British Film 1918-1929. George Allen & Unwin, 1971.
