= Edwin J. Collins =

British film director

- Born: 1875; Cheltenham, Gloucestershire, England
- Died: 14 January 1937 (aged 61–62); Richmond, Surrey, England
- Occupation: Film director
- Years active: 1912-1923

Edwin J. Collins (1875 – 14 January 1937) was a British film director of the silent era.

== Selected filmography ==
- Doing His Bit (1917)
- Tom Jones (1917)
- God and the Man (1918)
- Calvary (1920)
- Miss Charity (1921)
- The God in the Garden (1921)
- Stella (1921)
- Single Life (1921)
- Esmeralda (1922)
- The Green Caravan (1922)
- The Taming of the Shrew (1923)
- A Gamble with Hearts (1923)
