= Because (film) =

1918 British film by Sidney Morgan

- Directed by: Sidney Morgan
- Written by: Sidney Morgan
- Produced by: Frank E. Spring
- Starring: Lilian Braithwaite; Ben Webster; George Foley; Joyce Carey
- Production company: Progress Films
- Distributed by: Butcher's Film Service
- Release date: April 1918
- Country: United Kingdom
- Languages: Silent; English intertitles

Because is a 1918 British silent drama film directed by Sidney Morgan and starring Lilian Braithwaite, Ben Webster and George Foley. A father locks his daughter up when she refuses to marry the man he has chosen as her husband.

== Cast ==
- Lilian Braithwaite
- Ben Webster
- George Foley
- Joyce Carey
- Joan Morgan
- J. Hastings Batson

== Bibliography ==
- Low, Rachael. The History of British Film, Volume III: 1914-1918. Routledge, 1997.
