= The Temptress (1920 film) =

1920 film

- Directed by: George Edwardes-Hall
- Written by: T.W. Robertson
- Based on: Home; 1869 play by Émile Augier
- Produced by: Edward Godal
- Starring: Yvonne Arnaud; Langhorn Burton; John Gliddon
- Production company: British and Colonial
- Distributed by: Pathé Pictures International
- Release date: November 1920
- Country: United Kingdom
- Languages: Silent; English intertitles

The Temptress is a 1920 British silent romance film directed by George Edwardes-Hall and starring Yvonne Arnaud, Langhorn Burton and John Gliddon.

== Cast ==
- Yvonne Arnaud as Amy Howard
- Langhorn Burton as Allan Ashton
- John Gliddon as Paul Howard
- Christine Maitland as Mrs. Tredgett
- Austin Leigh as John Howard
- Edward Sorley as Arthur Stanley
- Bruce Winston as Reggie Featherstone
- Lennox Pawle as Perkins
- Saba Raleigh as Mrs. Tredgett

== Bibliography ==
- Low, Rachael. History of the British Film, 1918-1929. George Allen & Unwin, 1971.
