= George John Stevenson =

English bookseller, editor, headmaster, author, historian and hymnologist

George John Stevenson (1818–1888) was an English bookseller, editor, headmaster, author, historian and hymnologist.

== Life ==
Born in Princes Yard, Chesterfield on 7 July 1818 and baptised at Saltergate Methodist Chapel 26 July 1818 as 'George Stephenson', then later at St Mary and All Saints Anglican Church, 20 Feb 1824, as 'John Stevenson', eldest child of Jane Aldred, (1794–1855) and John Stevenson, Cordwainer (1792–1866) of Chesterfield. He was educated at Duttoris Free Grammar school, Chesterfield.

Stevenson was employed in the printing and bookselling business until 1844 when he entered St John's College, Battersea to be trained for an organising mastership under the National Society. In 1846 a reformatory school was established in the Philanthropic Institute, Southwark, to take selected criminals from prisons, and Stevenson was appointed as its first headmaster. In 1848 he became headmaster of the endowed parochial school at Lambeth Green.

In July 1850 he was married to Sarah Thomas, of Partington, at St Mary's Church, Bury. They settled in Lambeth, which was then part of Surrey.

Stevenson resigned his school post in 1855, and established himself in Paternoster Row as bookseller and publisher, a business which he continued until a few years before his death. From 1861 to 1867 he was editor and proprietor of the Wesleyan Times, and in 1882 he edited the Union Review. He had joined the Methodists in 1831, becoming very interested in their history, and published several books containing his research, including the acclaimed 'Methodist Hymn Book and its Associations', in 1869.

Stevenson died at his home, 12 Gore Road, South Hackney, London, on 16 August 1888 and was buried on 21 August 1888 in Abney Park Cemetery, Stoke Newington, London. He was survived by wife Sarah, and several of their children.

== Works ==
A Methodist from 1831, Stevenson wrote on the denomination's history and literature. His Methodist Hymn Book and its Associations (1869) was published in enlarged form as The Methodist Hymn Book, illustrated with Biography, Incident, and Anecdote (1883). He wrote also:

- The Origin of Alphabetical Characters, London, 1853.
- Sketch of the Life of C. H. Spurgeon, London, 1857; new edition 1887.
- The American Evangelist, London, 1860.
- The Prince of Preachers, C. H. Spurgeon, London.
- City Road Chapel, London, and its Associations, Edinburgh, 1872.
- Memorials of the Wesley Family, London, 1876; new edition 1883.
- Sir Charles Reed: a Life Sketch, London, 1884.
- Historical Records of the Young Men's Christian Association, London, 1884.
- Methodist Worthies, London, 1884.
- Memorial Sketch of May Stevenson, London, 1886.

Stevenson also edited A Historical Sketch of the Christian Community, 1818–1826 (1868) and Samuel Wesley's Memorials of Elizabeth Ann Wesley, London, 1887.

== Notes ==
Attribution

This article incorporates text from a publication now in the public domain: Lee, Sidney, ed. (1898). "Stevenson, George John". Dictionary of National Biography. Vol. 54. London: Smith, Elder & Co.
