= Saba Raleigh =

British actress (1862–1923)

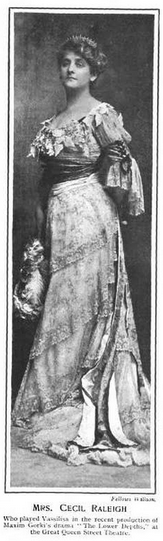
Mrs. Cecil Raleigh, from a 1903 publication.

Saba Raleigh was the pseudonym of Isabel Pauline Rowlands, née Ellissen (8 August 1862 – 22 August 1923), an English actress. On 31 March 1894 she became the second wife of Abraham Cecil Francis Fothergill Rowlands, the actor and playwright Cecil Raleigh, and was often billed as "Mrs. Cecil Raleigh".

== Selected filmography ==
- The Two Orphans (1915) billed as Mrs. Cecil Raleigh
- The Clemenceau Case (1915) billed as Mrs. Cecil Raleigh
- Profit and the Loss (1917)
- Desire (1920)
- The Temptress (1920)
- The Princess of New York (1921)
- Love Maggy (1921)
