= Langhorne Burton =

British actor (1880–1949)

- Born: 25 December 1880; Somersby, Lincolnshire, England
- Died: 6 December 1949 (aged 68); London, England
- Other name: Langhorn Burton
- Occupation: Film actor
- Years active: 1914–1930

Langhorne Burton (25 December 1880 – 6 December 1949) was a British film actor.

== Filmography ==
- Liberty Hall (1914)
- The King's Minister (1914)
- Bootle's Baby (1914)
- The Difficult Way (1914)
- The Treasure of Heaven (1916)
- The Profligate (1917)
- Daddy (1917) - John Melsher
- Auld Robin Gray (1917)
- Tom Jones (1917)
- God and the Man (1918) - Christiansen
- The Impossible Woman (1919)
- Sweet and Twenty (1919)
- The Amateur Gentleman (1920) - Barnabas Barty
- Little Dorrit (1920)
- The Children of Gibeon (1920)
- Two Little Wooden Shoes (1920)
- A Man's Shadow (1920)
- By Berwin Banks (1920)
- The Temptress (1920)
- At the Villa Rose (1920)
- Appearances (1921) - Sir William Rutherford
- Moth and Rust (1921)
- The Bonnie Brier Bush (1921) - John Carmichael
- Who Is the Man? (1924) - Albert Arnault
- Marriage License? (1926)
- The City of a Thousand Delights (1927)
- Cross Roads (1930)
