= Joan Morgan =

British actress and screenwriter (1905–2004)

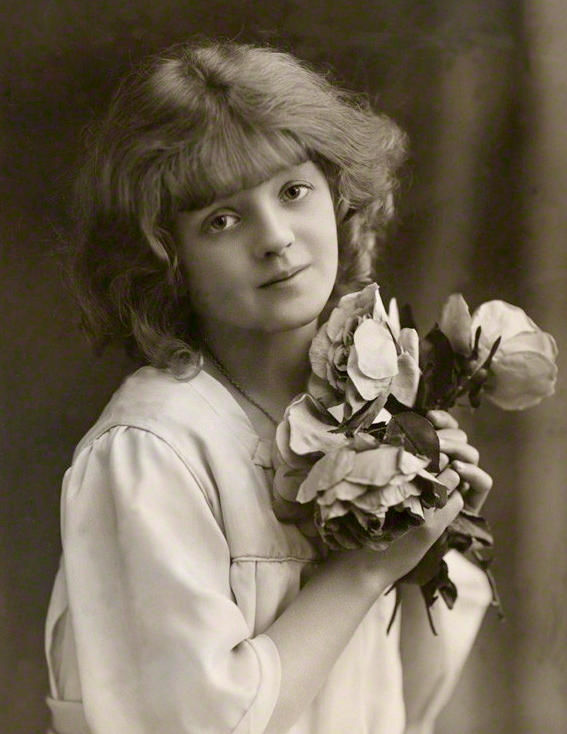
- Morgan in 1917
- Born: 1 February 1905; Forest Hill, London, United Kingdom
- Died: 22 July 2004 (aged 99); Henley-on-Thames, Oxfordshire; United Kingdom
- Occupations: Actress, Writer
- Years active: 1914–1948 (film)

Joan Morgan (1 February 1905 – 22 July 2004) was an English film actress, screenwriter and novelist.

Born in Forest Hill, London, she was the daughter of film director Sidney Morgan and his wife, Evelyn. Joan Morgan died at age 99 in Henley-on-Thames, Oxfordshire, UK in 2004.

She became a leading British star of the 1920s, after appearing in a number of films directed by her father. Her acting career was effectively ended by the arrival of sound film in 1929 and she switched to writing, working on a number of screenplays over the following decade. She also wrote for television.

She wrote novels under her own name and through using the pen-names Iris North and Joan Wentworth Wood.

== Filmography ==
=== Actress ===
- The Cup Final Mystery (1914)
- The Great Spy Raid (1914)
- Queenie of the Circus (1914)
- The World's Desire (1915)
- Iron Justice (1915)
- The Woman Who Did (1915)
- Light (1915)
- The Reapers (1916)
- Temptation's Hour (1916)
- The Perils of Divorce (1916)
- Her Greatest Performance (1916)
- The Last Sentence (1917)
- Drink (1917)
- Because (1918)
- The Scarlet Wooing (1920)
- Two Little Wooden Shoes (1920)
- The Children of Gibeon (1920)
- Lady Noggs (1920)
- Little Dorrit (1920)
- A Lowland Cinderella (1921)
- The Road to London (1921)
- The Truants (1922)
- The Lilac Sunbonnet (1922)
- Fires of Innocence (1922)
- Swallow (1922)
- The Crimson Circle (1922)
- Dicky Monteith (1922)
- Shadow of Egypt (1924)
- The Great Well (1924)
- The Woman Tempted (1926)
- A Window in Piccadilly (1928)
- Three Men in a Cart (1929)
- Her Reputation (1931)

=== Screenwriter ===
- Contraband Love (1931)
- The Flag Lieutenant (1932)
- The Callbox Mystery (1932)
- Chelsea Life (1933)
- Mixed Doubles (1933)
- Faces (1934)
- The Minstrel Boy (1937)
- Lily of Laguna (1938)
- Olympic Honeymoon (1940)
- This Was a Woman (1948)
