= Alice De Winton =

English actress (1870–1941)

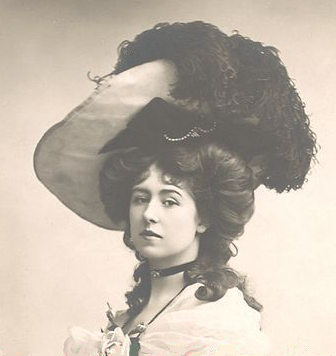
Alice De Winton wearing a Merry Widow hat, c. 1907 or later

Alice De Winton (born Alice Catherine Wilson 1870 – 1941) was an English actress. She was born and died in London. She was the daughter of Henry Wilson, a retired army surgeon major, and Louisa Ducrow (daughter of equestrian and circus manager Andrew Ducrow).

== Selected filmography ==
- A Cinema Girl's Romance (1915)
- The Marriage of William Ashe (1916)
- Sally Bishop (1916)
- A Fair Impostor (1916)
- Lady Windermere's Fan (1916)
- The Sorrows of Satan (1917)
- Democracy (1918)
- The Woman of the Iron Bracelets (1920)
- The Children of Gibeon (1920)
- The Door That Has No Key (1921)
- The Bachelor's Club (1921)
