= Irene Tripod =

British actress

Irene Tripod was a British actress of the silent era.

== Selected filmography ==
- The Romance of Lady Hamilton (1919)
- The Mystery Road (1921)
- The House of Peril (1922)
- Dicky Monteith (1922)
- The Beloved Vagabond (1923)
- Squibs' Honeymoon (1923)
- Squibs M.P. (1923)
- White Slippers (1924)
- A Friend of Cupid (1925)
- A Fowl Proceeding (1925)
- The Maid at the Palace (1927)
- The Feather (1929)
