= Sydney Fairbrother =

British actress (1872–1941)

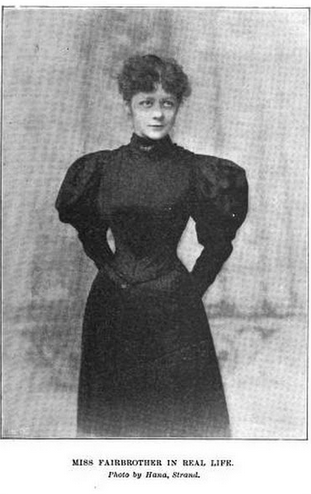
Sydney Fairbrother, from an 1896 publication.

Sydney Fairbrother (31 July 1872 – 4 January 1941) was a British actress.

Born Sydney Tapping on 31 July 1872 in London to actor/playwright Alfred B. Tapping and actress Florence Cowell. Her mother was the daughter of actor and comic singer Samuel Houghton Cowell. Sydney was educated at Blackpool and Bonn. She made her stage debut in Birmingham in 1890 with the famous Kendall Company and a few years later toured America with them. She came to the screen in 1915 in a film called Iron Justice and chiefly appeared in comedy roles. She retired in 1938 and died on 4 January 1941 in London, aged 68.

== Selected filmography ==
- Iron Justice (1915) - Mrs. O'Connor
- The Game of Liberty (1916) - Mrs. Bundercombe
- Temptation's Hour (1916)
- The Mother of Dartmoor (1916) - Mrs. Bolt
- Auld Lang Syne (1917) - Mrs. Potter
- Faith (1919) - Lavinia Brooker
- A Temporary Gentleman (1920) - Mrs. Hope
- Laddie (1920) - Mrs. Carter
- The Children of Gibeon (1920) - Mrs. Gibeon
- The Bachelor's Club (1921) - Tabitha
- The Rotters (1921) - Jemima Nivet
- The Golden Dawn (1921) - Mrs. Briggs
- Married Love (1923) - Mrs. Burrows
- Love, Life and Laughter (1923) - Lily
- The Rest Cure (1923) - Mrs. George
- The Beloved Vagabond (1923) - Mrs. Smith
- Heartstrings (1923) - Mrs.Chadwick
- Sally Bishop (1923) - Landlady
- Don Quixote (1923) - Tereza
- Wanted, a Boy (1924, Short) - The Aunt
- Love and Hate (1924, Short)
- Reveille (1924) - Sophie Fitch
- A Friend of Cupid (1925, Short) - Mrs. May
- A Fowl Proceeding (1925, Short) - Mrs. May
- Nell Gwyn (1926) - Mrs. Gwyn
- The Silver Lining (1927) - Mrs. Akers
- My Lord the Chauffeur (1927) - Lady Parr
- Confetti (1928) - Duchess Maxine
- The Rosary (1931) - Minor role (uncredited)
- Bindle (1931)
- Murder on the Second Floor (1932) - Miss Snell
- The Temperance Fete (1932) - Mrs. Bindle
- The Third String (1932) - Miss Peabody
- Double Dealing (1932) - Sarah Moon
- Down Our Street (1932) - Maggie Anning
- The Return of Raffles (1932)
- Insult (1932) - Arabella
- Lucky Ladies (1932) - Angle Tuckett
- The Return of Raffles (1932) - Lady Truwode
- Excess Baggage (1933) - Miss Toop
- Dora (1933, Short) - Mother
- Home, Sweet Home (1933) - Mrs. Bagshow
- The Crucifix (1934) - Lavinia Brooker
- Chu Chin Chow (1934) - Mahbubah Baba - Ali's Wife
- Gay Love (1934) - Dukie
- Brewster's Millions (1935) - Miss Plimsole
- The Private Secretary (1935) - Miss Ashford
- Fame (1936) - Train Passenger
- The Last Journey (1936) - Mrs. Grebe
- All In (1936) - Genesta Slott
- Dreaming Lips (1937) - Mrs. Stanway
- Rose of Tralee (1937) - Mrs. Thompson
- King Solomon's Mines (1937) - Gagool (uncredited)
- Paradise for Two (1937) - Miss Clare
- Make It Three (1938) - Aunt Aggie
- Little Dolly Daydream (1938) - Mrs. Harris
