= Nell Emerald =

English actress (1882–1969)

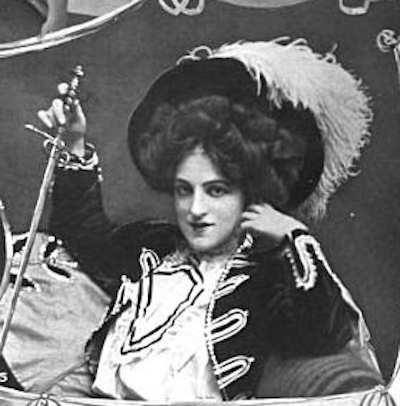
- Nell Emerald in 1908
- Born: Ellen Maud O'Shea; 29 October 1882; Westminster, London, England
- Died: 21 June 1969 (aged 86); Epsom, Surrey, England
- Occupation(s): Actress, film producer
- Relatives: Connie Emerald (sister); Ida Lupino (niece)

Ellen Maud O'Shea (29 October 1882 – 21 June 1969), known professionally as Nell Emerald, was an English-born actress and film producer.

== Early life and education ==
Emerald was born in London, England to Irish parents in 1882. All five of the O'Shea sisters were on the music hall stage from an early age, with their mother as their manager.

== Career ==
After her marriage in 1910, she moved from the music hall to the film studio, first as an actress in silent films, and by 1913 as a co-director of the Brightonia Film Company, based in Brighton, England. Nell Emerald appeared in Brightonia films as well as working behind the camera as producer.

Nell Emerald acted in silent films through the 1910s and 1920s, including a 1921 adaptation of Thomas Hardy's The Mayor of Casterbridge; Hardy himself visited the set of this production, though he never saw the finished work. Among her other silent films were The Grip of Iron (1914), A Bold Adventuress (1915), Fires of Innocence (1922), Chester Forgets Himself (1924, and adaptation of a story by P. G. Wodehouse), and A Girl of London (1925).

Emerald produced sound films in the 1930s. Among the titles she produced were Murder at the Cabaret (1936), Terror on Tiptoe (1936), and Dr. Sin Fang (1937), all low-budget thrillers. She also produced and appeared in Chinatown Nights (1938), a film later called "indescribably bad" by one critic. She also co-wrote at least one screenplay that was produced, This Week of Grace (1933), a recently rediscovered comedy starring Gracie Fields.

== Personal life ==
Nell O'Shea married David George Beattie in 1910. Her niece was actress and film director Ida Lupino (Lupino's mother was Nell's sister, actress Connie Emerald). Emerald died in 1969, age 86.

A minor character in Willa Cather's A Lost Lady (1923) is named "Nell Emerald," but is more likely based on a Colorado madam named Fannie Fernleigh.
