= Sidney Morgan =

English film director (1874–1946)

- Sidney Morgan in Juno and the Paycock (1930)
- Born: 2 August 1874; Bermondsey, London, England
- Died: 11 June 1946 (aged 71); Boscombe, Bournemouth, Hampshire, England
- Occupations: Film director, screenwriter, film producer, actor
- Years active: 1914–1940

Sidney Morgan (2 August 1874 – 11 June 1946) was an English film director, screenwriter, producer and actor. He directed 45 films between 1914 and 1937. As an actor, he appeared in the Alfred Hitchcock film Juno and the Paycock. He was born in Bermondsey, London and died in Boscombe, Bournemouth, Hampshire. His daughter Joan Morgan appeared as silent film actress in his films.

== Selected filmography ==
- The Brass Bottle (1914)
- Iron Justice (1915)
- The World's Desire (1915)
- Auld Lang Syne (1917)
- Democracy (1918)
- Because (1918)
- Sweet and Twenty (1919)
- After Many Days (1919)
- All Men Are Liars (1919)
- Lady Noggs (1920)
- A Man's Shadow (1920)
- The Children of Gibeon (1920)
- The Black Sheep (1920)
- Little Dorrit (1920)
- The Woman of the Iron Bracelets (1920)
- The Scarlet Wooing (1920)
- By Berwin Banks (1920 – directed)
- Moth and Rust (1921)
- The Mayor of Casterbridge (1921 – directed)
- The Lilac Sunbonnet (1922)
- Fires of Innocence (1922)
- A Lowland Cinderella (1922)
- The Woman Who Obeyed (1923 – directed)
- Miriam Rozella (1924)
- Bulldog Drummond's Third Round (1925 – directed)
- The Woman Tempted (1926)
- A Murderous Girl (1927)
- A Window in Piccadilly (1928)
- The Thoroughbred (1928)
- The Alley Cat (1929)
- Juno and the Paycock (1930 – actor)
- Her Reputation (1931 – directed)
- Mixed Doubles (1933)
- Faces (1934)
- The Minstrel Boy (1937)
- Lily of Laguna (1938)
