= Arthur Lennard =

British music hall singer and actor (1867–1954)

- Born: Arthur Edward Hall; 8 March 1867; Plumstead, London, England
- Died: 14 January 1954 (aged 86); Shoreham-by-Sea, Sussex
- Occupations: Singer, actor
- Years active: 1887-1922

Arthur Lennard (born Arthur Edward Hall; 8 March 1867 – 14 January 1954) was a British music hall singer, stage and silent film actor.

== Biography ==
He was born in Plumstead, and first appeared on stage at Holborn in 1887. A tenor, he sang ballads, such as the popular "Skylark", as well as topical songs and parodies. He performed in variety shows and pantomimes before retiring from the stage in 1916.

He then enjoyed a brief career as a silent film actor, appearing in nine films in the early 1920s including Fires of Innocence (1922).

He died in 1954 and was buried at St Nicolas Church, Shoreham-by-Sea.

== Selected filmography ==
- Little Dorrit (1920)
- By Berwin Banks (1920)
- The Children of Gibeon (1920) - Mr. Gibeon
- The Black Sheep (1920)
- Fires of Innocence (1922)

== Bibliography ==
- Low, Rachael. The History of the British Film 1918-1929. George Allen & Unwin, 1971.
