= List of British films of 1929 =

British films released in 1929

A list of British films released in 1929. These consists of various genres.

== 1929 ==
=== A-M ===
Title	Director	Cast	Genre	Notes
After the Verdict	Henrik Galeen	Olga Chekhova, Warwick Ward, Malcolm Tod	Drama	
Alf's Carpet	W. P. Kellino	Harald Madsen, Carl Schenstrøm	Comedy, Fantasy	
The Alley Cat	Hans Steinhoff	Mabel Poulton, Jack Trevor	Drama	Co-production with Germany
Atlantic	Ewald André Dupont	Franklin Dyall, Madeleine Carroll	Drama	Also released as a British-made German-language film Atlantik
Auld Lang Syne	George Pearson	Harry Lauder, Dorothy Boyd	Drama	
Blackmail	Alfred Hitchcock	Cyril Ritchard, Anny Ondra, Sara Allgood	Thriller	First British talkie film
The Bondman	Herbert Wilcox	Norman Kerry, Frances Cuyler	Adventure	
Bright Eyes	Géza von Bolváry	Betty Balfour, Jack Trevor	Romance	Co-production with Austria
The Broken Melody	Fred Paul	Georges Galli, Andrée Sacré, Enid Stamp-Taylor	Romance	
A Broken Romance	J. Steven Edwards	William Freshman, Blanche Adele	Drama	
The Burgomaster of Stilemonde	George Banfield	John Martin Harvey, Fern Andra	Drama	
The Celestial City	J. O. C. Orton	Norah Baring, Lewis Dayton	Crime	
Chamber of Horrors	Walter Summers	Frank Stanmore, Joan Maude	Horror	
Champaigner	Geza von Bolvary	Betty Balfour, Jack Trevor	Romantic comedy	Co-production with Austria
City of Play	Denison Clift	Chili Bouchier, Patrick Aherne	Drama	
The Clue of the New Pin	Arthur Maude	Benita Hume, Kim Peacock	Mystery	
The Co-Optimists	Edwin Greenwood	Melville Gideon, Clifford Grey	Musical	
A Cottage on Dartmoor	Anthony Asquith	Norah Baring, Uno Henning	Drama	
The Crimson Circle	Frederic Zelnik	Lya Mara, Stewart Rome	Crime	Co-production with Germany
The Crooked Billet	Adrian Brunel	Madeleine Carroll, Carlyle Blackwell	Crime	
Cupid in Clover	Frank Miller	Winifred Evans, Herbert Langley	Romance	
Dark Red Roses	Sinclair Hill	Stewart Rome, Una O'Connor	Drama	
Daughter of the Regiment	Hans Behrendt	Betty Balfour, Alexander D'Arcy	Comedy	Co-production with Germany
The Devil's Maze	Gareth Gundrey	Renee Clama, Trilby Clark	Drama	
Down Channel	Michael Barringer	Henry Victor, Alf Goddard	Action/Adventure	
Drifters	John Grierson		Documentary	
The Feather	Leslie S. Hiscott	Jameson Thomas, Véra Flory	Drama	
The Flying Scotsman	Castleton Knight	Moore Marriott, Pauline Johnson	Thriller	
The Flying Squad	Arthur Maude	Dorothy Bartlam, Donald Calthrop	Crime	
Glorious Youth	Graham Cutts	Anny Ondra, Randle Ayrton	Drama	
High Seas	Denison Clift	Lillian Rich, John Stuart, James Carew	Adventure	
High Treason	Maurice Elvey	Jameson Thomas, Benita Hume	Sci-fi/War	
Human Cargo	J. Steven Edwards	David Dunbar, Eric Hales	Crime	
The Informer	Arthur Robison	Lya De Putti, Lars Hanson, Dennis Wyndham	Drama	Half silent, half in sound
The Inseparables	Adelqui Migliar, John Stafford	Elissa Landi, Patrick Aherne	Romance	
Kitty	Victor Saville	Estelle Brody, John Stuart	Drama	
The Lady from the Sea	Castleton Knight	Ray Milland, Mona Goya, Moore Marriott	Romance	
Lily of Killarney	George Ridgwell	Cecil Landau, Barbara Gott, Dennis Wyndham	Drama	
Little Miss London	Harry Hughes	Pamela Parr, Eric Bransby Williams	Comedy	
Lost Patrol	Walter Summers	Cyril McLaglen, Sam Wilkinson, Terence Collier	Crime/War	
The Lure of the Atlantic	Norman Lee	Eric Hales, Iris Darbyshire	Drama	
The Manxman	Alfred Hitchcock	Carl Brisson, Malcolm Keen, Anny Ondra	Drama	
Master and Man	George A. Cooper	Humberston Wright, Henri De Vries	Drama	

=== P-Z ===
Title	Director	Cast	Genre	Notes
Pavement Butterfly	Richard Eichberg	Anna May Wong, Alexander Granach	Drama	Co-production with Germany
A Peep Behind the Scenes	Jack Raymond	Frances Cuyler, Haddon Mason	Drama	
Piccadilly	Ewald André Dupont	Anna May Wong, Gilda Gray	Crime	
The Plaything	Castleton Knight	Estelle Brody, Heather Thatcher	Romance	
Power Over Men	George Banfield	Isabel Jeans, Jameson Thomas	Crime	
The Pride of Donegal	J. Steven Edwards	Robina Maugham, Syd Crossley	Drama	
Red Aces	Edgar Wallace	Nigel Bruce, Douglas Payne	Crime	
The Return of the Rat	Graham Cutts	Ivor Novello, Isabel Jeans, Mabel Poulton	Crime	
Ringing the Changes	Leslie S. Hiscott	Henry Edwards, Charles Cantley, James Fenton	Comedy	
The Runaway Princess	Anthony Asquith	Mady Christians, Fred Rains	Drama	Co-production with Germany
The Sacrifice	Victor Peers	Lewis Dayton, Andrée Tourneur	Drama	
Shooting Stars	A. V. Bramble	Annette Benson, Brian Aherne	Drama	
The Silent House	Walter Forde	Mabel Poulton, Gibb McLaughlin	Crime	
Sin	Gustaf Molander	Lars Hanson, Elissa Landi, Gina Manès	Drama	Co-production with Sweden
The Silver King	T. Hayes Hunter	Percy Marmont, Harold Huth	Crime	
Smashing Through	W. P. Kellino	John Stuart, Eve Gray	Crime	
The Streets of London	Norman Lee	David Dunbar, Wera Engels	Crime	
Taxi for Two	Denison Clift	Mabel Poulton, John Stuart	Romantic comedy	
The Third Eye	Maclean Rogers	Dorothy Seacombe, Hayford Hobbs	Crime	
Those Who Love	Manning Haynes	William Freshman, Carol Goodner	Romance	
The Three Kings	Hans Steinhoff	Henry Edwards, Evelyn Holt	Drama	Co-production with Germany
A Throw of Dice	Franz Osten	Seeta Devi, Himansu Rai		Co-produced with Germany and India
To What Red Hell	Edwin Greenwood	Sybil Thorndike, Bramwell Fletcher	Crime	
Under the Greenwood Tree	Harry Lachman	Marguerite Allan, Nigel Barrie	Drama	
Unto Each Other	A. E. Coleby	Harry Lorraine, Josephine Earle	Drama	
The Vagabond Queen	Géza von Bolváry	Betty Balfour, Dino Galvani	Comedy	
Wait and See	Walter Forde	Walter Forde, Frank Stanmore	Comedy	
The Way of Lost Souls	Paul Czinner	Pola Negri, Warwick Ward	Drama	Co-production with Germany
When Knights Were Bold	Tim Whelan	Nelson Keys, Miriam Seegar	Comedy/Fantasy	
Why Cry at Parting?	Richard Eichberg	Dina Gralla, Harry Halm	Drama	Co-production with Germany
The Woman in White	Herbert Wilcox	Blanche Sweet, Haddon Mason	Drama	
Woman to Woman	Victor Saville	Betty Compson, George Barraud	Melodrama	
Would You Believe It!	Walter Forde	Walter Forde, Pauline Johnson	Comedy	Originally a silent film, converted into sound
The Wrecker	Géza von Bolváry	Carlyle Blackwell, Benita Hume	Crime	Co-production with Germany

== See also ==
- 1929 in British music
- 1929 in British television
- 1929 in film
- 1929 in the United Kingdom
