= The Little People (film) =

1926 film

- Directed by: George Pearson
- Written by: Thorold Dickinson; George Pearson
- Produced by: George Pearson; Thomas Welsh
- Starring: Betty Balfour; Frank Stanmore; Gerald Ames
- Cinematography: Percy Strong
- Edited by: Fred Pullin
- Production company: Welsh-Pearson
- Distributed by: Butcher's Film Service
- Release date: April 1926
- Country: United Kingdom
- Languages: Silent; English intertitles

The Little People is a 1926 British silent romance film directed by George Pearson and starring Mona Maris, Frank Stanmore and Gerald Ames.

The film's sets were designed by the Brazilian art director Alberto Cavalcanti.

== Cast ==
- Mona Maris as Lucia Morelli
- Frank Stanmore as Paolo
- Gerald Ames as Walery
- Barbara Gott as Sala
- Harry Farniss as Gian
- Randle Ayrton as Lyn
- James Reardon as Manevski

== Bibliography ==
- Low, Rachael. The History of the British Film 1918-1929. George Allen & Unwin, 1971.
