= Satan's Sister =

1925 film

- Directed by: George Pearson
- Written by: Henry De Vere Stacpoole (novel); George Pearson
- Produced by: George Pearson; Betty Balfour
- Starring: Betty Balfour; Guy Phillips; Philip Stevens
- Cinematography: Percy Strong
- Production company: Welsh-Pearson
- Distributed by: Woolf & Freedman Film Service
- Release date: 24 May 1925
- Country: United Kingdom
- Languages: Silent; English intertitles

Satan's Sister is a 1925 British silent adventure film directed by George Pearson and starring Betty Balfour, Guy Phillips and Philip Stevens. It is an adaptation of the 1921 novel Satan: A Romance of the Bahamas by Henry De Vere Stacpoole. The novel was later adapted again as the 1965 film The Truth About Spring.

== Cast ==
- Betty Balfour as Jude Tyler
- Guy Phillips as Satan Tyler
- Philip Stevens as Bobbie Ratcliffe
- James Carew as Tyler
- Frank Stanmore as Cleary
- Caleb Porter as Carquinez
- Frank Perfitt as Sellers
- Jeff Barlow as Bones

== Bibliography ==
- Low, Rachael. The History of the British Film 1918-1929. George Allen & Unwin, 1971.
