= Squibs' Honeymoon =

1923 film

- Directed by: George Pearson
- Written by: Betty Balfour; Leslie S. Hiscott; George Pearson; T.A. Welsh
- Produced by: George Pearson
- Starring: Betty Balfour; Hugh E. Wright; Fred Groves
- Production company: Welsh-Pearson
- Distributed by: Gaumont British Distributors
- Release date: December 1923
- Country: United Kingdom
- Languages: Silent; English intertitles

Squibs' Honeymoon is a 1923 British silent comedy film directed by George Pearson and starring Betty Balfour, Hugh E. Wright and Fred Groves. It was the last of the silent film series featuring the character, although Balfour returned to play her in the 1935 sound film Squibs. Both Pearson and Balfour were particular favourites of the British film critic, and later leading screenwriter, Roger Burford. In his first article for the magazine Close Up Burford would write "Not long ago a film of the Squibbs series was reported to be on at a small cinema in a slum district. It was a rare chance, and we went at once. We were not disappointed: the film was English, with proper tang; the tang of Fielding or Sterne.' Burford's comments help place the Squibbs films perfectly in British culture between the wars. They were very much working-class comedy, drawing on a vernacular, performative tradition, but at the same time their "Englishness" is characteristic of the kinds of satirical comedies found in the novels of Henry Fielding and Laurence Sterne. That earthy satire, based on everyday life, made these comedies unpalatable to middle class audiences but the Squibbs films were amongst the most interesting, and well shot, films in Britain in the 1920s.

== Cast ==
- Betty Balfour as Squibs Hopkins
- Hugh E. Wright as Sam Hopkins
- Fred Groves as PC Charlie Lee
- Frank Stanmore as Horace Honeybunn
- Irene Tripod as Euphemia Fitzbulge
- Robert Vallis as Bob
- Maurice Redmund as Jean

== Bibliography ==
- Low, Rachael. The History of the British Film 1918-1929. George Allen & Unwin, 1971.
