= The Third String (1932 film) =

1932 film

- Original trade ad
- Directed by: George Pearson
- Written by: W.W. Jacobs (story); A.R. Rawlinson; James Reardon; George Pearson
- Produced by: T.A. Welsh; George Pearson
- Starring: Sandy Powell; Kay Hammond; Mark Daly; Alf Goddard
- Production company: Welsh-Pearson
- Distributed by: Gaumont British Distributors
- Release date: February 1932
- Running time: 65 minutes
- Country: United Kingdom
- Language: English

The Third String is a 1932 British sports comedy film directed by George Pearson and starring Sandy Powell, Kay Hammond and Mark Daly. It is based on a W.W. Jacobs short story, which had previously been turned into a silent film. It was made at Cricklewood Studios.

== Premise ==
A man poses as a boxer to impress a woman, but then is forced to fight a real champion.

== Cast ==
- Sandy Powell as Ginger Dick
- Kay Hammond as Hebe Tucker
- Mark Daly as Pete Russett
- Alf Goddard as Bill Lumm
- Charles Paton as Sam Small
- Sydney Fairbrother as Miss Peabody
- Polly Emery as Mrs. Chip
- James Knight as Webson

== Bibliography ==
- Goble, Alan. The Complete Index to Literary Sources in Film. Walter de Gruyter, 1999.
