= Flower seller =

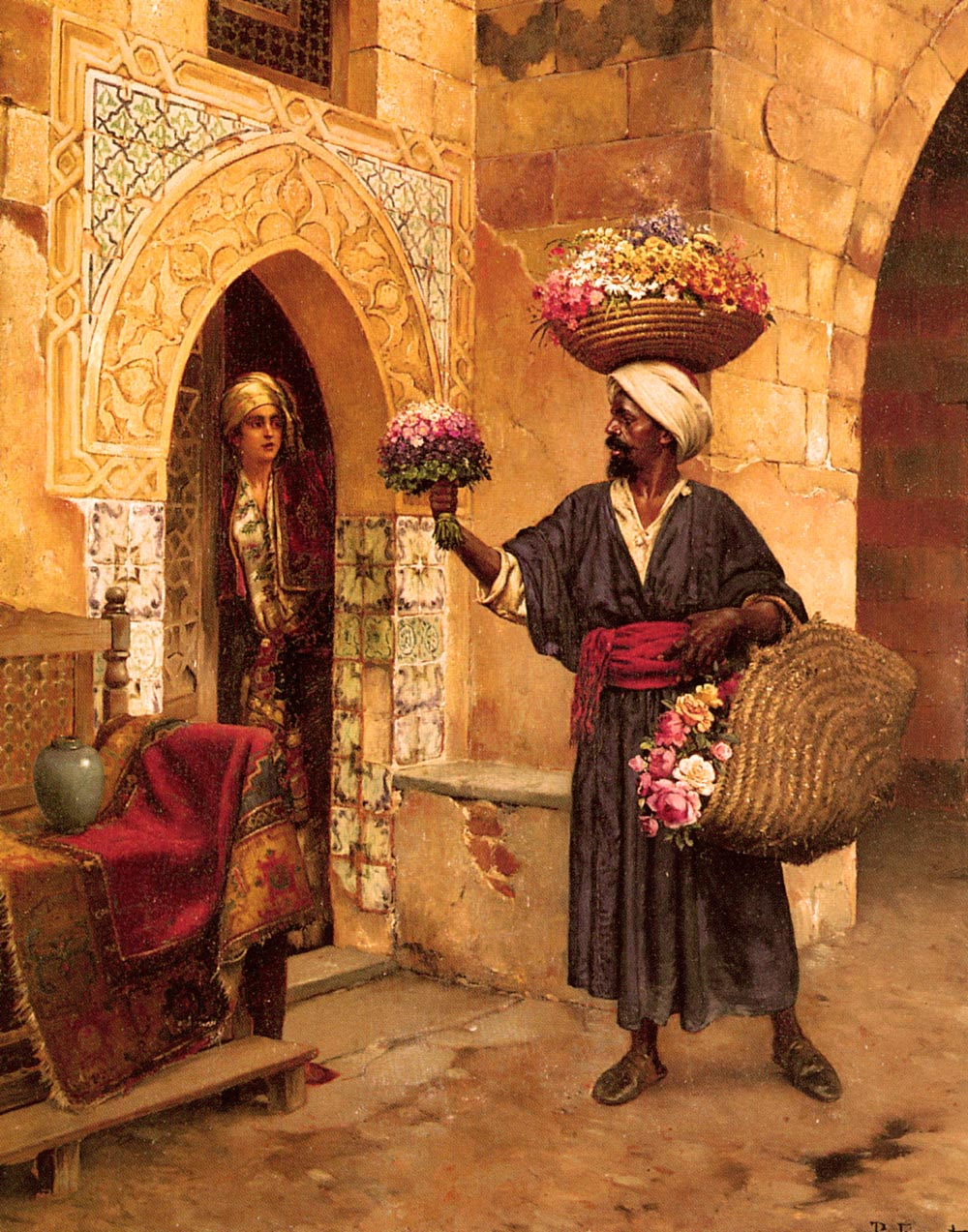
Rudolf Ernst painting of The Flower Vendor

A flower seller, traditionally a woman, sells flowers on the street. Often the flowers are carried in a basket, for example. The subject matter has been a favorite of artists. The profession has mostly died out in countries like the United Kingdom, but still exists in others such as India.

The 1920s series of British Squibs films were constructed around the adventures of a London "flower girl" played by Betty Balfour.

== Gallery ==
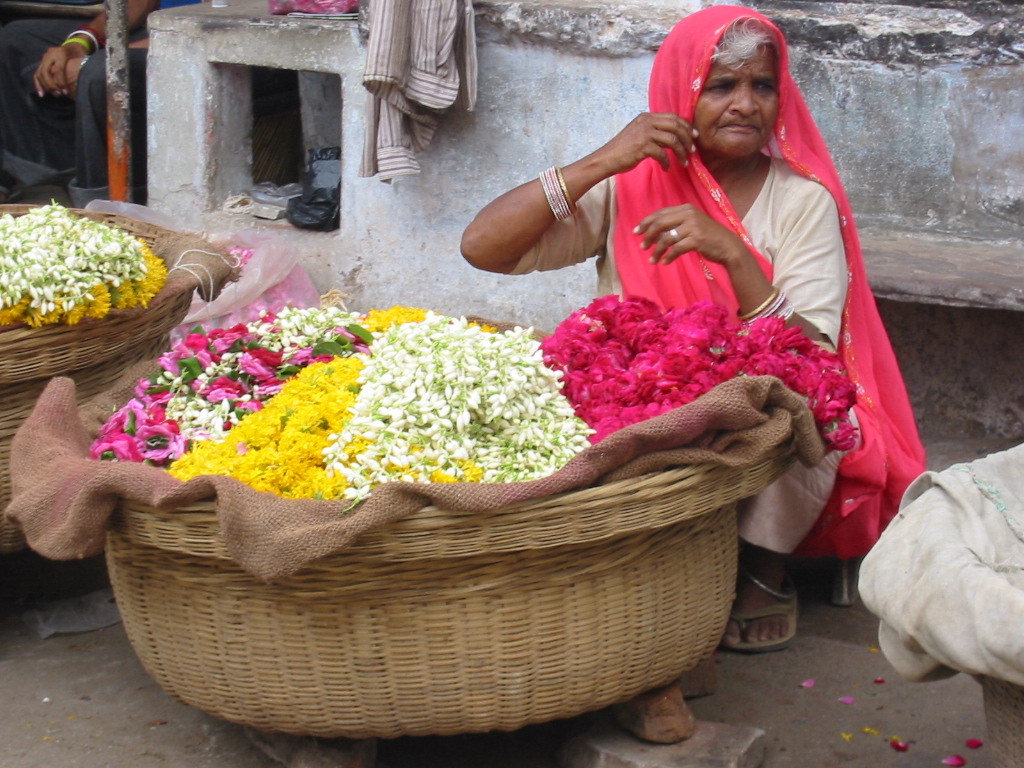
A flower seller in Pushkar, India

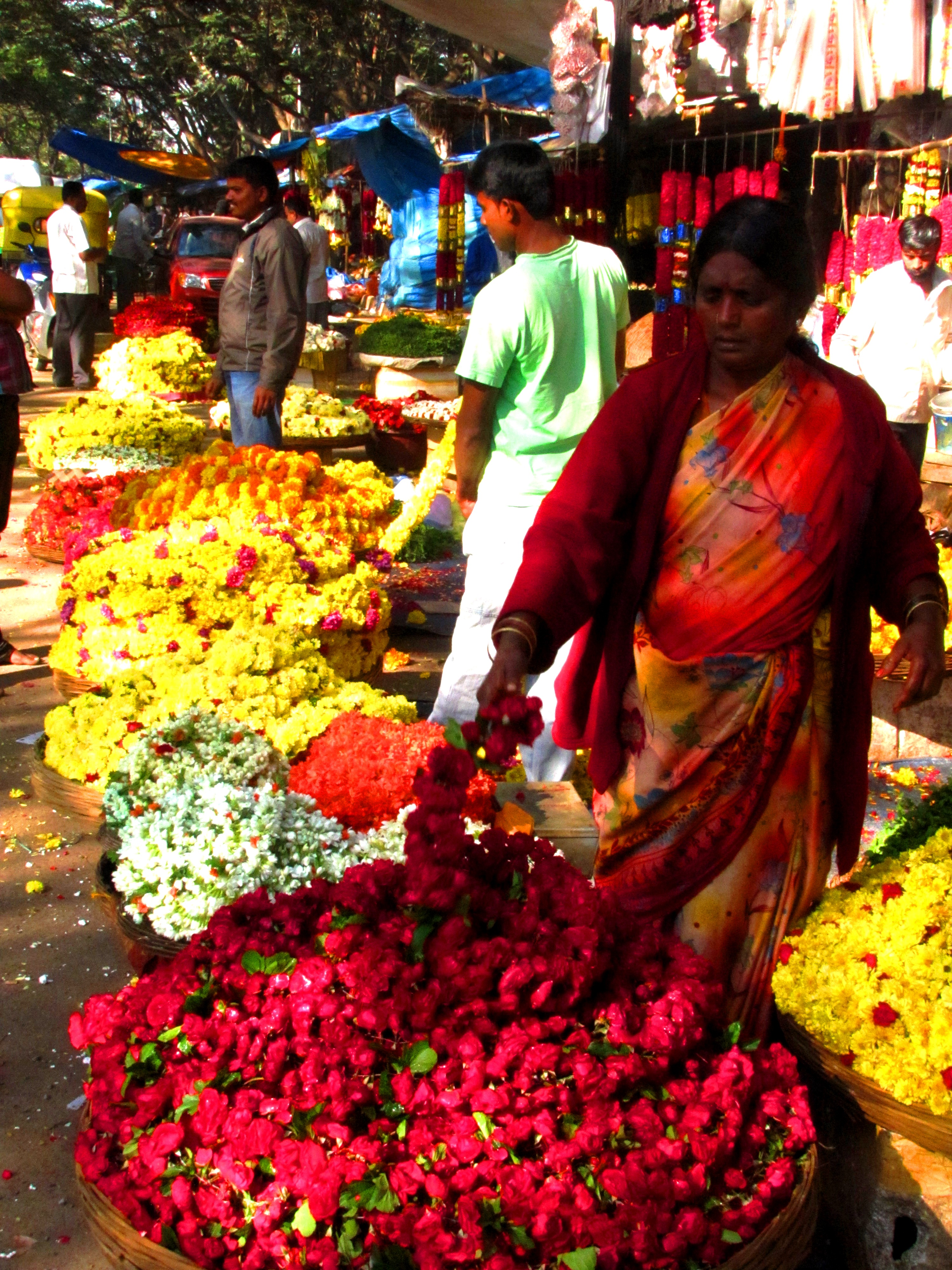
Flower Sellers in Madiwala Market, Bangalore, India

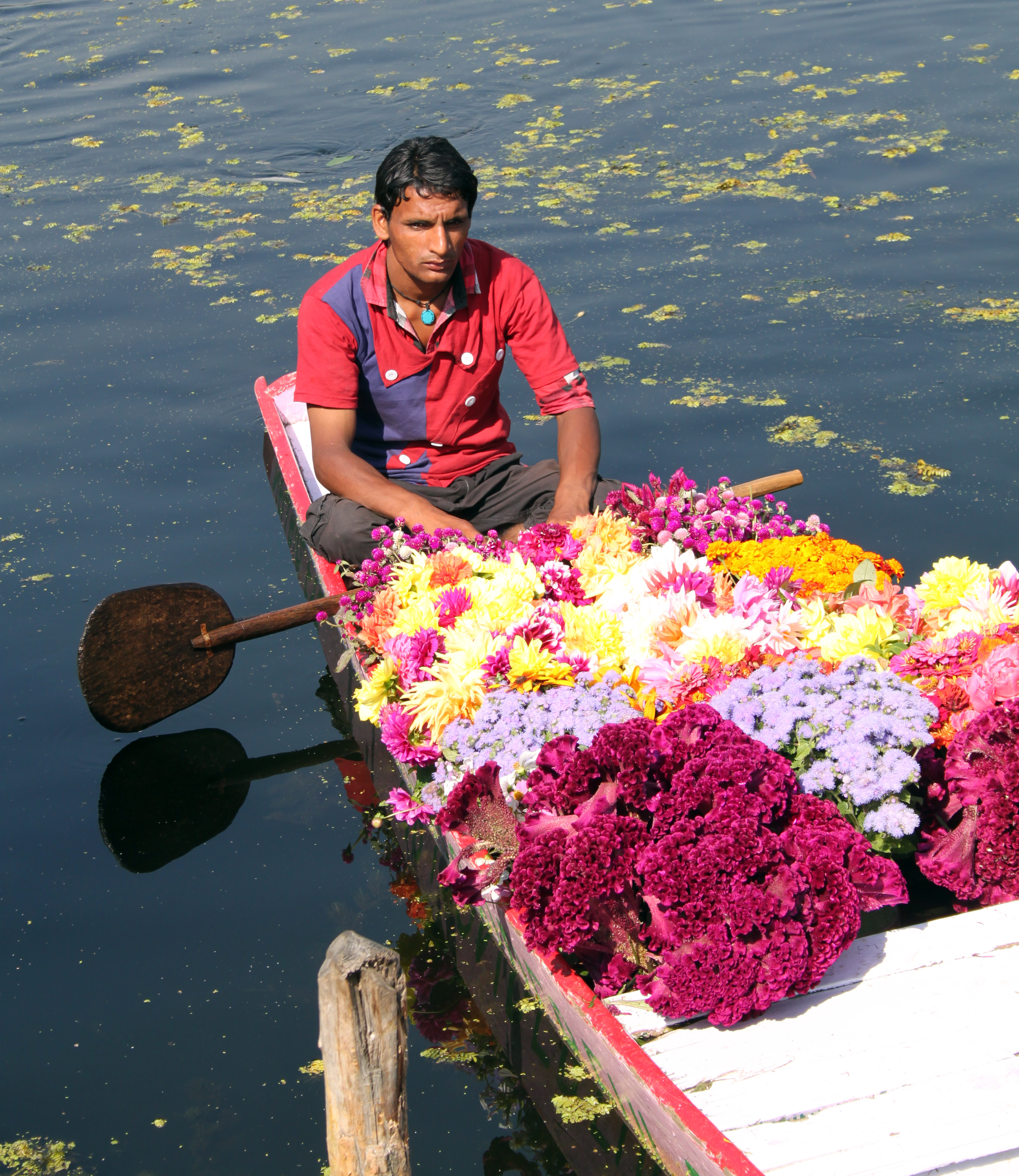
Flower seller in Kashmir
