= The Love Wager =

1932 film

- Wallace Douglas and Pat Paterson in the film
- Directed by: A. Cyran
- Written by: Moira Dale
- Produced by: E.A. Fell
- Starring: Pat Paterson; Frank Stanmore; Wallace Douglas
- Production company: Anglo-European
- Distributed by: Paramount British Pictures
- Release date: 1933
- Running time: 64 minutes
- Country: United Kingdom
- Language: English

The Love Wager is a 1933 British comedy film directed by A. Cyran and starring Pat Paterson, Frank Stanmore and Wallace Douglas. It was written by Moira Dale and released by Paramount Pictures as a quota quickie.

== Preservation status ==
The British Film Institute National Archive holds a collection of ephemera and stills but no film or video materials.

== Plot ==
General Neville, an explosive but soft-hearted old Army officer, falls out with his son Peter over the latter's love for Peggy, a shop girl. However, the General makes a deal with Peter, promising to consent to the engagement if Peter can earn £1,500 within a year. Peter gets a job as a bargee, but as the deadline approaches, his chances of winning the bet look slim. Desperate for a solution, Peggy writes for advice to "Auntie Prue", the editor of a women's newspaper column, who goes to interview the General, who has coincidentally just been robbed of his precious family heirlooms. She uncovers information that puts Peter on the trail of the suspects. Following a struggle with the thief on the London Underground, Peter manages to retrieve the stolen jewels, thereby securing the hefty reward offered by his father, and winning the wager.

== Cast ==
- Pat Paterson as Peggy
- Frank Stanmore as Shorty
- Wallace Douglas as Peter Neville
- Morton Selten as General Neville
- Moira Dale as Auntie Prue
- Harold Saxon-Snell as Huxter
- Hugh E. Wright as Noakes
- Philip Godfrey as Ed Grimes

== Reception ==
The Daily Film Renter wrote: "Ingenuous romance adventure, relieved by attractive settings against the background of English countryside and Grand Junction Canal. Acting general production on simple lines. ... Quota offering for very uncritical patrons."

Kine Weekly wrote: "Romance of London life, the good thematic values of which have not been exploited to the fullest advantage. There is, however, a certain simple naivete about the film, coupled with picturesque waterfront shots, which may appeal to the unsophisticated and get it over in small halls, despite its lacking of such considered essentials as vitality, crispness and decision. ... The producer, A. Cyran, fails to marshal the fundamentals, and the loose development prevents the situations from registering with essential snap."

Picturegoer wrote: "A picture which misses its opportunities. The story is bright in idea and allows for a good London atmosphere, including canal side and underground sequences. Unfortunately, the development is poor and the acting not outstanding. It is ingenuous in treatment and lacking in vitality and punch. The canal-side sequences are picturesque."
