= Blinkeyes =

1926 British film by George Pearson

- Directed by: George Pearson
- Written by: Oliver Sandys
- Produced by: George Pearson
- Starring: Betty Balfour; Tom Douglas; Frank Stanmore
- Production company: Welsh-Pearson
- Distributed by: Gaumont British Distributors
- Release date: 28 September 1926
- Country: United Kingdom
- Languages: Silent; English intertitles

Blinkeyes is a 1926 British silent drama film directed by George Pearson and starring Betty Balfour, Tom Douglas, and Frank Stanmore.

It was shot at Cricklewood Studios in London. It was the final collaboration between Pearson and Balfour and was considered a disappointment compared to their earlier work.

== Plot ==
A young orphan dancer named Blinkeyes resides with her elderly uncle Dick. One evening, after leaving the theater, she is struck by a car driven by Ken Clay, a wealthy young man. Though uninjured, she berates Ken because his appearance reminds her of the man who seduced and abandoned her late mother. Upon returning home, Blinkeyes discovers that Uncle Dick has incurred a debt, and neither her boyfriend, the Basher, nor her friend Flowerpots, can assist in raising the required funds. Feeling desperate, she visits a bar and announces that she is available for marriage to the highest bidder. Surprisingly, Ken Clay wins the bid. Reluctantly, Blinkeyes agrees to accompany him. However, Betty, Blinkeyes' jealous boyfriend, challenges Ken to a fight, giving them ten days to prepare. Despite the Basher's attempt to ambush Ken prematurely, Ken, a skilled fighter, emerges victorious. Blinkeyes begins to develop feelings for Ken, but her hopes are dashed when she reads in the newspaper that he is set to marry a young English millionaire. Seeking solace, she confides in her friend Flowerpots, only to have Ken pursue her.

== Cast ==
- Betty Balfour as Blinkeyes
- Tom Douglas as Ken Clay
- Frank Stanmore as Flowerpots
- Patrick Aherne as The Basher
- Hubert Carter as Clary
- Dorothy Seacombe as Bella
- J. Fisher White as Uncle Dick
- Mary Dibley as Mrs. Banning
- Frank Vosper as Seymour

== Bibliography ==
- Low, Rachael. History of the British Film, 1918-1929. George Allen & Unwin, 1971. ISBN 978-0-04-791021-0.
