= Mord Em'ly =

1922 film

- Directed by: George Pearson
- Written by: William Pett Ridge (novel); Eliot Stannard
- Produced by: George Pearson
- Starring: Betty Balfour; Rex Davis; Elsie Craven
- Production company: Welsh-Pearson
- Distributed by: Jury Films
- Release date: January 1922
- Country: United Kingdom
- Languages: Silent; English intertitles

Mord Em'ly is a 1922 British silent drama film directed by George Pearson and starring Betty Balfour, Rex Davis and Elsie Craven. It was based on the 1898 novel of the same title by William Pett Ridge.

== Cast ==
- Betty Balfour as Maud Emily
- Rex Davis as Barden
- Elsie Craven as Gilliken
- Edward Sorley as Father
- Mrs. Hubert Willis as Mother

== Bibliography ==
- Low, Rachael. The History of the British Film 1918-1929. George Allen & Unwin, 1971.
