= The Third String =

The Third String may refer to:

- The Third String (1914 film), a silent British film
- The Third String (1932 film), a British film
