= The Romance of Old Bill =

- Directed by: George Pearson
- Written by: T.A. Welsh; George Pearson
- Starring: Charles Rock; Arthur Cleave; Hugh E. Wright
- Production company: Welsh-Pearson
- Distributed by: Jury Films
- Release date: April 1918
- Country: United Kingdom
- Languages: Silent; English intertitles

The Romance of Old Bill is a 1918 British silent comedy war directed by George Pearson and starring Charles Rock, Arthur Cleave and Hugh E. Wright. It was made at Twickenham Studios. It is based on the play The Better 'Ole, with the setting updated to the First World War.

== Cast ==
- Charles Rock as Old Bill
- Arthur Cleave as Bert
- Hugh E. Wright as Alf
- Mary Dibley as Maggie Busby
- Hayford Hobbs as Jim
- Lillian Hall-Davis as Lil
- Alfred Phillips as Spy
- Michelin Potous as Victoire
- Marguerite Blanche as Suzette
- J.M. Wright as Singer
- Sid Jay as Juggler
- Mansell Fane as Grouser
- Frank Adair as Colonel
- Meggie Albanesi as Waitress
- Mercy Hatton
- Micrommelynck as Colonel
- Fernand Leone as Peasant

== Bibliography ==
- Goble, Alan. The Complete Index to Literary Sources in Film. Walter de Gruyter, 1999.
