= Squibs M.P. =

1923 film

- Directed by: George Pearson
- Written by: Leslie S. Hiscott; George Pearson
- Produced by: George Pearson
- Starring: Betty Balfour; Hugh E. Wright; Fred Groves
- Production company: Welsh-Pearson
- Distributed by: Gaumont British Distributors
- Release date: September 1923
- Country: United Kingdom
- Languages: Silent; English intertitles

Squibs M.P. is a 1923 British silent comedy film directed by George Pearson and starring Betty Balfour, Hugh E. Wright and Fred Groves.

== Cast ==
- Betty Balfour as Squibs Hopkins
- Hugh E. Wright as Sam Hopkins
- Fred Groves as PC Charlie Lee
- Irene Tripod as Euphemia Fitzbulge
- Frank Stanmore as Horace Honeybunn
- Odette Myrtil as Dancer

== Bibliography ==
- Low, Rachael. The History of the British Film 1918-1929. George Allen & Unwin, 1971.
