= Cinders (1926 film) =

1926 British film by Louis Mercanton

Cinders is a 1926 British silent comedy film directed by Louis Mercanton and starring Betty Balfour, Fred Wright and André Roanne.

== Plot summary ==
Entomologist Professor Pottiefax inherits a fortune and the "Palace", a luxurious hotel-casino on the French Riviera. He leaves his London boarding house, taking his devoted maid Betty with him. In France, Pottiefax is ridiculed for his interest in insects.

Ferraro, the hotel manager, gets Pottiefax drunk and photographs him in an attempt to blackmail him into handing over the hotel. Betty and Richard Dalroy thwart the plan, and get married.

== Cast ==
- Betty Balfour - Betty "Cinders"
- Fred Wright - Professor Pottiefax
- André Roanne - Richard Dalrey
- Louis Baron - Ferraro
- [Lucy Sibley - Mrs Catchpole
- Irene Tripod - boarder
- Albert Decoeur - manager
- Louis Lerton - chef
- Jean Mercanton - groom
