= Reveille (film) =

1924 film

- Directed by: George Pearson
- Written by: George Pearson
- Produced by: George Pearson
- Starring: Betty Balfour
- Cinematography: Basil Emmott; Percy Strong
- Production company: Welsh-Pearson
- Distributed by: Gaumont British Distributors
- Release date: June 1924
- Running time: 93 minutes
- Country: United Kingdom
- Language: Silent

Reveille is a 1924 British silent drama film directed by George Pearson. It follows some British soldiers during and after the First World War, though Pearson wrote in a January 1924 letter to his cast and crew:

There is no story, as such. I hate the well-made Story with its Exposition, Denouement, Crisis, etc., as material for my elusive Screen. I confess I cannot write one.

As of August 2010, the film is missing from the BFI National Archive, and is listed as one of the British Film Institute's "75 Most Wanted" lost films, though at least some sequences survive in private hands. It is sometimes confused with the 1925 German film Reveille: The Great Awakening.

== Cast ==
- Betty Balfour as Mick
- Stewart Rome as Nutty
- Ralph Forbes as The Kid
- Sydney Fairbrother as Sophie Fitch
- Frank Stanmore as Whelks
- Henrietta Watson as The Mother
- Guy Phillips as Fred
- Walter Tennyson as Captain
- Charles Ashton as Sam
- Donald Searle as Ted
- Buena Bent as Amelia Fitch
- Simeon Stuart as Colonel

== See also ==
- List of lost films
- List of incomplete or partially lost films
