= Mary-Find-the-Gold =

1921 film

Mary Find the Gold
- Directed by: George Pearson
- Written by: George Pearson
- Starring: Betty Balfour; Tom Coventry; Hugh E. Wright
- Cinematography: Emile Lauste
- Production company: Welsh-Pearson
- Distributed by: Jury Films
- Release date: March 1921
- Country: United Kingdom
- Languages: Silent; English intertitles

Mary-Find-the-Gold (or Mary Find the Gold) is a 1921 British silent drama film directed by George Pearson and starring Betty Balfour, Tom Coventry and Hugh E. Wright.

== Cast ==
- Betty Balfour as Mary Smith
- Tom Coventry as Tom
- Hugh E. Wright as Alfred Smith
- Colin Craig as Jack Bryant
- Mabel Poulton as Bessie Bryant
- Arthur Cleave as Arthur Drew
- Mary Dibley as Miss Reeve
- Madge Tree as Miss Stag
- Betty Farquhar as Miss Payne
- Lilian Braithwaite as Widow Mather
- Gladys Hamer as Higgs
- Thomas Weguelin as Wurzel Blake

== Bibliography ==
- Low, Rachael. The History of the British Film 1918-1929. George Allen & Unwin, 1971.
