= Somebody's Darling =

1925 film

Somebody's Darling is a 1925 British silent comedy film directed by George A. Cooper and starring Betty Balfour, Rex O'Malley and Fred Raynham.

The screenplay concerns a young woman who believes herself to be an orphan and rediscovers her family when she is left a large inheritance, only for a sinister uncle to try to cheat her out of money. The film marked an attempt by Balfour to avoid being typecast in her popular role as the Cockney Squibs by playing an upper-class heiress. She defended her move by declaring "I don't have to wear any shabby or sombre dresses for this part. I go out and spend lots of money on beautiful Paquin gowns and frocks and wraps".

== Cast ==
- Betty Balfour - Joan Meredith
- Rex O'Malley - Jack Esmonds
- Fred Raynham - J.W. Jordan
- J. Fisher White - Grandfather
- Minna Grey - Miss Jordan
- Clarence Blakiston - Sir John Esmonds
- A. Bromley Davenport - Sleeper
- Clifton Boyne - Publisher
- Jack Harris - Potman

== Bibliography ==
- Macnab, Geoffrey. Searching for Stars: Stardon and Screen Acting in British Cinema. Cassell, 2000.
