= Garryowen (film) =

1920 film

- Directed by: George Pearson
- Based on: Garryowen: The Romance of a Race-Horse by Henry de Vere Stacpoole
- Starring: Fred Groves; Hugh E. Wright; Moyna Macgill
- Production company: Welsh-Pearson
- Release date: 1920
- Country: United Kingdom
- Language: Silent (English intertitles)

Garryowen is a 1920 British silent sports film directed by George Pearson and starring Fred Groves, Hugh E. Wright and Moyna Macgill. It was based on a novel by Henry De Vere Stacpoole. It concerns an impoverished Irish gentleman who tries to rescue his family from ruin by running his horse Garryowen at The Derby.

== Cast ==
- Fred Groves - Michael French
- Hugh E. Wright - Moriarty
- Moyna Macgill - Violet Grimshaw
- Bertram Burleigh - Robert Dashwood
- Arthur Cleave - Giveean
- Alec Thompson - Andy
- Little Zillah - Effy French
- Stella Brereton - Mrs. Moriarty
- Lilian Braithwaite - Mrs. Driscoll
- Marjorie Gaffney - Biddy
- Betty Cameron - Susie

== See also ==
- List of films about horses
- List of films about horse racing
