= The Romany =

1923 film

- Directed by: Floyd Martin Thornton
- Written by: Eliot Stannard
- Produced by: George Pearson
- Starring: Victor McLaglen; Irene Norman; Harvey Braban; Peggy Hathaway
- Cinematography: Percy Strong
- Production company: Welsh-Pearson
- Distributed by: Jury Films
- Release date: January 1923
- Running time: 5, 700 feet
- Country: United Kingdom
- Languages: Silent; English intertitles

The Romany is a 1923 British silent adventure film directed by Floyd Martin Thornton and starring Victor McLaglen, Irene Norman and Harvey Braban.

== Cast ==
- Victor McLaglen as The Chief
- Irene Norman as Valia
- Harvey Braban as Andrew MacDonald
- Peggy Hathaway as Flora
- Malcolm Tod as Robbie
- Ida Fane as Zilla
- Hugh E. Wright
- Harry Agar Lyons
- N. Watt-Phillips

== Bibliography ==
- Low, Rachael. History of the British Film, 1918-1929. George Allen & Unwin, 1971.
