= Mabel Poulton =

English actress (1901–1994)

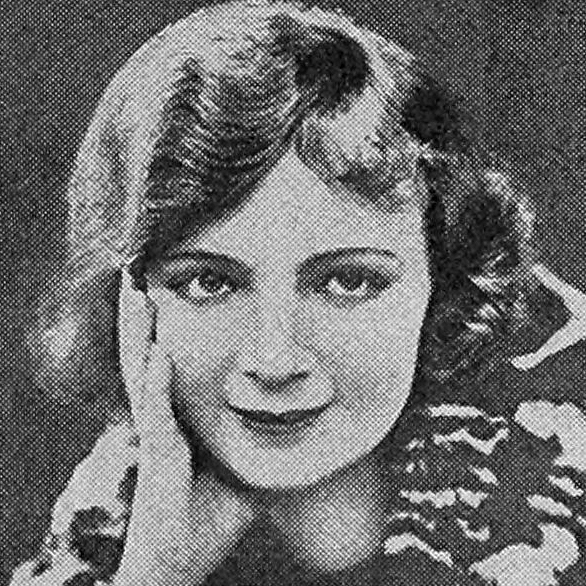
- Born: Mabel Lilian Poulton; 13 April 1901; Bethnal Green, London, England
- Died: 21 December 1994 (aged 93); London Borough of Merton, England
- Years active: 1920–1938
- Spouse: Richard Phillips (m. 1939)

Mabel Lilian Poulton (13 April 1901 – 21 December 1994) was an English film actress, popular in Britain during the era of silent films.

== Career ==
Born in Bethnal Green, London, England, Poulton worked as a stenographer and entered films by chance. Her first role in George Pearson's Nothing Else Matters (1920) was opposite Betty Balfour, who was also making her debut, and the film was a success. Over the next several years, Poulton was cast in a succession of roles, and usually played feisty or mischievous characters. A petite blonde, she also became well regarded for her fashion style, and was a highly recognisable celebrity. In 1928, she starred in The Constant Nymph by Adrian Brunel and received excellent reviews for her performance. By the end of the decade, she was considered to be one of Britain's leading screen actresses along with Balfour, and was described by critics as Balfour's only serious rival.

The advent of sound film brought a premature end to Poulton's film career. The addition of the microphone revealed Poulton's broad Cockney accent, which was at odds with the characters she had become identified with. Like Clara Bow who faced the same problem as a result of her Brooklyn accent, Poulton struggled to maintain her status. Also, like Bow, she attempted to mount a comeback in the mid-1930s, which was well publicised but unsuccessful. She made her final film appearance in 1938.

== Later years and death ==
She spent her last years writing and re-writing a typescript about a young British starlet who is raped by a film director and who then descends into alcoholism. In biro, at some point of the writing process, she wrote in real names. Thomas Bentley is the director whom she accused. Bentley directed two films in which Poulton stars: The Old Curiosity Shop (1921) and Not Quite a Lady (1928).

Poulton died in 1994 in Merton, Surrey, aged 93.

== Filmography ==
- Nothing Else Matters (1920)
- The God in the Garden (1921)
- Mary-Find-the-Gold (1921)
- The Old Curiosity Shop (1921)
- Moonbeam Magic (1924)
- Heart of an Actress (1924)
- The Ball of Fortune (1926)
- The Glad Eye (1927)
- Virginia's Husband (1928)
- The Hellcat (1928)
- The Constant Nymph (1928)
- Not Quite a Lady (1928)
- Palais de danse (1928)
- Troublesome Wives (1928)
- A Daughter in Revolt (1928)
- The Silent House (1929)
- The Return of the Rat (1929)
- Taxi for Two (1929)
- The Alley Cat (1929)
- Escape (1930)
- Children of Chance (1930)
- Number, Please (1931)
- Crown v. Stevens (1936)
- Terror on Tiptoe (1936)
- Bed and Breakfast (1938)
