= The Two Boys =

(The) Two Boys may refer to:

- The Two Boys (1924 film), French silent film directed by Louis Mercanton
- The Two Boys (1936 film), French drama film directed by Fernand Rivers
- Two Boys, 2011 American opera
- Two-Boys Gumede (born 1985), South African footballer
