= Three from St Cyr =

- Directed by: Jean-Paul Paulin
- Written by: Gérard Carlier; Paul Fékété
- Starring: Roland Toutain; Jean Mercanton; Jean Chevrier
- Cinematography: Marcel Lucien
- Edited by: Jean Feyte; André Versein
- Music by: Pierre Dupont; Marceau Van Hoorebecke
- Production company: Productions Calamy
- Distributed by: SEDIF
- Release date: 1 February 1939
- Running time: 97 minutes
- Country: France
- Language: French

Three from St Cyr (French: Trois de St Cyr) is a 1939 French adventure film directed by Jean-Paul Paulin and starring Roland Toutain, Jean Mercanton and Jean Chevrier. It was part of a group of big budget war and spy stories made at the time, which enjoyed box office success in the period just before the Second World War broke out.

The film's sets were designed by the art directors Pierre Schild and Marcel Magniez.

== Synopsis ==
Three graduates of the French military academy at St Cyr are posted to Syria where they become involved in the fight against rebels.

== Cast ==
- Roland Toutain as Paul Parent
- Jean Mercanton as Jean Le Moyne
- Jean Chevrier as Pierre Mercier
- Paul Amiot as Le général
- Jean Worms as Le commandant Lenoir
- Jean Parédès as Bréval
- Maurice Marceau as Beaumont
- Jean Fay as Le lieutenant Moulin
- Chukry-Bey as Un chef de tribu
- Hélène Perdrière as Françoise le Moyne
- Léon Belières as M. Le Moyne

== Bibliography ==
- Crisp, Colin. Genre, Myth and Convention in the French Cinema, 1929-1939. Indiana University Press, 2002.
