= Desdemona Mazza =

Italian film actress (born 1901)

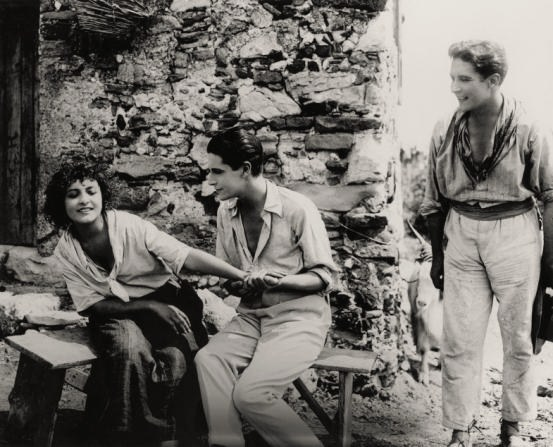
- Mazza on left in the movie The Call of the Blood (1920)
- Born: 3 October 1901; Castel San Pietro Terme, Bologna, Kingdom of Italy
- Occupation: Actress
- Years active: 1920–1931 (film)

Desdemona Mazza (born 3 October 1901 – ?) was an Italian film actress of the silent era.

== Selected filmography ==
- Miarka (1920)
- The Call of the Blood (1921)
- The Mysteries of Paris (1922)
- The Love Letters of Baroness S (1924)
- Martyr (1927)
- Madame Récamier (1928)
- Venus (1929)
- Sister of Mercy (1929)

== Bibliography ==
- Ann C. Paietta. Saints, Clergy and Other Religious Figures on Film and Television, 1895-2003. McFarland, 2005.
