= Sister of Mercy (film) =

1929 film

- Directed by: George Pallu
- Starring: Desdemona Mazza; Georges Melchior; Lucette Martell
- Cinematography: Mario Badouaille; Jean Jouannetaud
- Production company: Isis Films
- Distributed by: Pathé Rural
- Release date: 18 October 1929
- Country: France
- Languages: Silent; French intertitles

Sister of Mercy (French: La petite soeur des pauvres) is a 1929 French silent drama film directed by George Pallu and starring Desdemona Mazza, Georges Melchior, and Lucette Martell.

== Cast ==
- Desdemona Mazza
- Georges Melchior
- Lucette Martell
- Monsieur de Saint-André
- Cécile Didier
- Frédéric Mariotti as Le jardinier
- Rainaldi
- Edmée Colson
- Florial

== Bibliography ==
- Philippe Renard. Un cinéaste français des années cinquante : Jean-Paul Le Chanois. Dreamland, 2000.
