= Love, Life and Laughter (1923 film) =

1923 film

- Directed by: George Pearson
- Written by: George Pearson
- Starring: Betty Balfour
- Cinematography: Percy Strong
- Release date: June 1923
- Running time: 90 minutes
- Country: United Kingdom
- Language: Silent

Love, Life and Laughter is a 1923 British silent film, written and directed by George Pearson. For many years the film was thought lost, and was listed as one of the British Film Institute's "75 Most Wanted" lost films. On 2 April 2014, Dutch film institute Eye announced it had discovered a copy.

== Plot ==
An impoverished author and a cabaret girl each have their dream of success, but are happy to wake to each other and reality.

== Cast ==
- Betty Balfour
- Harry Jonas
- Frank Stanmore
- Annie Esmond
- Nancy Price
- Sydney Fairbrother
- Eric Smith
- A. Harding Steerman
- Audrey Ridgewell
- Gordon Hopkirk
- Dacia

== See also ==
- List of rediscovered films
