= Arthur Cleave =

British actor

- Born: 9 April 1884; Ilfracombe, Devon, England, UK
- Died: 2 December 1939; London
- Occupation: Actor

Arthur Cleave (9 April 1884–2 December 1939) was a British actor.

He died in London aged 55 and was buried in Brompton Cemetery in London.

== Selected filmography ==
- The Romance of Old Bill (1918)
- The Lady Clare (1919)
- Garryowen (1920)
- Nothing Else Matters (1920)
- The Bachelor's Club (1921)
- Mary Find the Gold (1921)
- The Adventures of Mr. Pickwick (1921)
- The Card (1922)
- A Master of Craft (1922)
- Old Bill Through the Ages (1924)
- Her Redemption (1924)
