= Croquette (film) =

1927 film directed by Louis Mercanton

- Directed by: Louis Mercanton
- Written by: Eric Maschwitz (novel); Louis Mercanton; Robert Péguy
- Starring: Betty Balfour; Walter Byron; Nicolas Koline
- Cinematography: Raoul Aubourdier; Vladimir Toporkoff
- Production companies: Films de France; Société des Cinéromans
- Distributed by: Pathé Consortium Cinéma
- Release date: 1927
- Country: France
- Languages: Silent; French intertitles

Croquette is a 1927 French silent film directed by Louis Mercanton and starring Betty Balfour, Walter Byron and Nicolas Koline.

== Cast ==
- Betty Balfour as Croquette
- Walter Byron as Bob
- Nicolas Koline as Morton
- Rachel Devirys as Lola Morelli
- Louis Baron fils as L'Indendant Blomart
- Ernest Chambéry as Monsieur Pluche, le pharmacien
- Futelais as Clown
- Madeleine Guitty as Madame Tromboli
- Bonaventura Ibáñez as Le Duc de Valdomme
- Jean Mercanton as Dickie
- Bob O'Connor as Clown
- Albert Rancy as Jose

== Bibliography ==
- Goble, Alan. The Complete Index to Literary Sources in Film. Walter de Gruyter, 1999.
