= The Two Boys (1924 film) =

1924 film

- French: Les deux gosses
- Directed by: Louis Mercanton
- Written by: Pierre Decourcelle (novel); Louis Mercanton; Arthur Shirley
- Starring: Jean Mercanton; André Rolane; Leslie Shaw
- Cinematography: André-Wladimir Reybas
- Production company: Phocea Film
- Distributed by: Société des Films Mercanton
- Release date: 26 December 1924
- Country: France
- Languages: Silent; French intertitles

The Two Boys (French: Les deux gosses) is a 1924 French silent film directed by Louis Mercanton and starring Jean Mercanton, André Rolane and Leslie Shaw. It was based on the 1880 novel of the same name by Pierre Decourcelle. It was remade as a sound film in 1934.

== Cast ==
- Jean Mercanton as young Fanfan
- André Rolane as young Claudinet
- Leslie Shaw as Fanfan
- Jean Forest as Claudinet
- Yvette Guilbert as Zéphyrine
- Gabriel Signoret as La limace
- Albert Decoeur as Mulot
- Marjorie Hume as Hélène de Kerlor
- Carlyle Blackwell as Count Georges de Kerlor
- Gina Relly as Carmen de Saint-Hyriex
- Édouard Mathé as D'Alboise
- Paul Guidé as Saint-Hyriex
- Jeanne Rollette as Ernestine
- Irma Perrot as Thérèse
- Louis Kerly as butler
- Andrews Engelmann as Fadart
- Paul Franceschi
