= The Passenger (1928 film) =

1928 film

- Directed by: Jacques de Baroncelli
- Starring: Jean Mercanton; Charles Vanel; Michèle Verly
- Release date: 1928
- Country: France
- Languages: Silent; French intertitles

The Passenger (French: Le passager) is a 1928 French silent film directed by Jacques de Baroncelli and starring Jean Mercanton, Charles Vanel and Michèle Verly.

== Cast ==
- Jean Mercanton
- Charles Vanel
- Michèle Verly
- Walter Byron
- Nicolas Redelsperger
- Abel Sovet

== Bibliography ==
- John Holmstrom. The moving picture boy: an international encyclopaedia from 1895 to 1995. Michael Russell, 1996.
