= The Truth About Spring =

1965 film by Richard Thorpe

- Theatrical poster
- Directed by: Richard Thorpe
- Written by: James Lee Barrett
- Based on: Satan: A Romance of the Bahamas (1921) by Henry De Vere Stacpoole
- Produced by: Alan Brown
- Starring: Hayley Mills; John Mills; James MacArthur
- Cinematography: Edward Scaife
- Edited by: Thomas Stanford
- Music by: Robert Farnon
- Production company: Quota Rentals
- Distributed by: Rank Film Distributors (UK); Universal Pictures (US)
- Release date: 31 March 1965
- Running time: 102 minutes
- Countries: United Kingdom; United States
- Language: English
- Box office: $1,500,000

The Truth about Spring (also known as The Pirates of Spring Cove or Miss Jude) is a 1965 American-British Technicolor adventure film directed by Richard Thorpe and starring Hayley Mills, John Mills and James MacArthur. It is a romantic comedy adventure. It was released by Universal. According to Filmink "it tried to be a Disney-style adventure-romance, complete with another Disney alumni as lead (James MacArthur) and location filming (Spain), but did not work."

== Plot ==
Spring lives with her father, Tommy Tyler, aboard a run-down sailboat in the Florida Keys. She has lived a simple, carefree, and isolated life. She has never felt desire or love until William Ashton joins them for a zany adventure involving buried treasure. Ashton, who is from a wealthy Philadelphia family and graduated from Harvard Law School, comes aboard the Sarah Tyler for some fishing. Instead, he becomes involved in a modern-day pirate adventure. He falls in love with Spring and envies her simple and honest lifestyle. Spring initially dislikes Ashton – a variation of Pride and Prejudice where boy meets girl and girl hates boy. By the end of the film, no treasure is found but Spring realizes she loves Ashton. Against all sense of propriety, he asks her to marry him. Spring initially resists, concerned over how her father would manage without her, but Tommy insists she go with him, telling her he wants grandchildren.

== Cast ==
- Hayley Mills as Spring Tyler
- John Mills as Captain Tommy Tyler
- James MacArthur as William Ashton
- David Tomlinson as Ashton's bored, rich uncle.
- Lionel Jeffries as José Carkez
- Harry Andrews as Judd Sellers
- Niall MacGinnis as Cleary
- Lionel Murton as Simmons

== Production ==
The film was based on the 1921 novel Satan by Henry de Vere Stacpoole. The book was filmed in 1925 as Satan's Sister.

The film was announced in September 1963 as Miss Jude with both Mills attached from the beginning. Producer Alan Brown had been associate producer to Samuel Bronston and this would be his first film as production. It was the third film John and Hayley Mills had made together after Tiger Bay and The Chalk Garden. John Mills said he wanted to use the title Close to the Wind but it was held by another studio.

Location shooting took place in S'Agaró on the Costa Brava in southern Spain and started 22 April 1964. The MGM-British Studios at Elstree were also used for some shooting. The film's sets were designed by the art director Gil Parrondo.

David Tomlinson later called it "a truly dreadful film but with my new-found Hollywood cachet I was billed as making a 'Guest Appearance' in nice big capital letters".

John Mills later wrote "if the picture had turned out to be half as good as the food, the wine, the time and the laughs we had on that location it would have been a sensation - unfortunately it wasn't."

== See also ==
- Satan's Sister (1925), based on the same book
- The Cruise of the Make-Believes (1918), which has a similar theme
