= Rex O'Malley =

British actor (1901–1976)

- Born: Sean Rex Patrick O'Malley; 2 January 1901; London, England
- Died: 1 May 1976 (aged 75); New York City
- Occupation: Actor
- Years active: 1927 - 1971

Rex O'Malley (2 January 1901 – 1 May 1976) was a British actor. His mother was an Irish seamstress. He acted on Broadway, in films and in television. He remains perhaps best known for his supporting roles in Camille (1936) with Greta Garbo and Midnight (1939) starring Claudette Colbert and Don Ameche.

== Broadway roles ==
- The Marquise (1927) as Miquel
- The Bachelor Father (1928) as Geoffrey Trent
- The Apple Cart (1930) as Sempronius
- Lost Sheep (1930) as Eric Bailey
- No More Ladies (1934) as James Salston
- Revenge with Music (1934) as Pablo
- Matrimony Pfd. (1936) as Dr. Robert Levy-de Coudray
- The Man Who Came to Dinner (1939) as Beverly Carlton
- The Cherry Orchard (1944) as Epikhodov, Semen Panteleevich a clerk
- Lute Song (1946) as Youen-Kong a steward
- Lady Windermere's Fan (1946) as Mr. Cecil Graham

== Selected filmography ==
- Somebody's Darling (1925)
- Camille (1936) as Gaston
- Zaza (1939)
- Midnight (1939)
- The Thief (1952)
