= Squibs (1935 film) =

- Betty Balfour working as a flower seller in Piccadilly Circus is confronted by policeman Stanley Holloway (far left)
- Directed by: Henry Edwards
- Written by: Michael Hogan; H. Fowler Mear; R. P. Weston; Bert Lee
- Produced by: Julius Hagen
- Starring: Betty Balfour; Gordon Harker; Stanley Holloway
- Cinematography: Sydney Blythe
- Edited by: Jack Harris
- Music by: W.L. Trytel
- Production company: Real Art Productions
- Distributed by: Gaumont British Distributors
- Release date: June 1935
- Running time: 77 minutes
- Country: United Kingdom
- Language: English

Squibs is a 1935 British musical romantic comedy film directed by Henry Edwards and starring Betty Balfour, Gordon Harker and Stanley Holloway. It was written by Michael Hogan, H. Fowler Mear, R. P. Weston and Bert Lee and produced by Twickenham Film Studios with sets designed by James A. Carter. It was a remake of the 1921 film Squibs which also starred Balfour.

== Plot ==
A Cockney flower girl is in love with a policeman whom she wants to marry. Her father opposes the union because he is involved in a little crooked investing. The young woman wins a lottery and is able to find wealth and marital bliss.

== Cast ==
- Betty Balfour as Amelia "Squibs" Hopkins
- Gordon Harker as Sam Hopkins
- Stanley Holloway as Constable Charley Lee
- Margaret Yarde as Mrs. Lee
- Morris Harvey as Inspector Lee
- Michael Shepley as Colin Barratt
- Drusilla Wills as Mrs. Parker
- O. B. Clarence as Sir John Barratt
- Ronald Shiner as Bill
- Thomas Weguelin as Alf
- Vivienne Chatterton
- William Daunt
- Aubrey Fitzgerald
- Henryetta Edwards as Susan
- Olive Sloane as barmaid

== Reception ==
The Monthly Film Bulletin wrote: "Without being very ambitious in intention this film introduces all the standard features of the up-to-date musical – song and dance, solo and in chorus, odd angle photography, and the like; but the whole production suggests a selective imitation, reminiscent of striking films of recent times; and, though Betty Balfour as Squibs puts energy and skill into her part and the two Yorkshire policemen have the real tang, there is a lack of character and originality in the film as a whole, which, therefore, as a piece of screen-work is to be classified as somewhat mediocre, though it may well te enjoyable to many who are not too exacting in their standard."

Kine Weekly wrote: "The plot is not too clearly defined, but its thematic shortcomings are admirably concealed by the versatility of the principal players. Betty Balfour contributes a performance of tireless resource and energy in the lead, Gordon Harker never fails to register with his cockney humour, and Stanley Holloway turns his inimitable technique to song and character acting with equal facility. Added to the enthusiastic team work is pleasing spectacle set to music."
