= Nothing Else Matters (film) =

1920 film

- Directed by: George Pearson
- Written by: George Pearson
- Produced by: George Pearson
- Starring: Hugh E. Wright; Moyna Macgill
- Cinematography: George Pearson
- Edited by: George Pearson
- Distributed by: Jury
- Release date: July 1920
- Country: United Kingdom
- Languages: Silent film English intertitles

Nothing Else Matters is a 1920 British film, written by Hugh E. Wright, and directed by George Pearson. This was the screen debut of Mabel Poulton and Betty Balfour who went on to become leading British stars of the 1920s.

== Plot ==
A comedy/drama genre film, about the life of a British Music Hall comic.

== Cast ==
- Hugh E. Wright
- Moyna Macgill
- Betty Balfour
- George Keene
- Mabel Poulton
- Arthur Cleave
- Alec Thompson
- Leal Douglas
- Polly Emery
- Reginald Denham
