= Jean Mercanton =

French actor (1920–1947)

- Born: 17 May 1920; Marseille, France
- Died: 4 November 1947 (aged 27); Paris, France
- Other name: Jean Louis Georges Mercanton
- Occupation: Actor
- Years active: 1920 - 1946 (film)

Jean Mercanton (20 May 1920 – 4 November 1947) was a French film actor. Mercanton began his career as a child actor, making his film debut in the year of his birth.

== Selected filmography ==
- Miarka (1920)
- The Two Boys (1924)
- Cinders (1926)
- The Maid at the Palace (1927)
- Croquette (1927)
- The Passenger (1928)
- Venus (1929)
- The Mystery of the Villa Rose (1930)
- Princess, At Your Orders! (1931)
- Narcotics (1932)
- Monsieur Albert (1932)
- He Is Charming (1932)
- Captain Benoit (1938)
- The Little Thing (1938)
- Three from St Cyr (1939)
- The Phantom Carriage (1939)
- Lucrèce (1943)
- The Ménard Collection (1944)
- Destitute Mary (1945)
- Distress (1946)
- Son of France (1946)

== Bibliography ==
- Goble, Alan. The Complete Index to Literary Sources in Film. Walter de Gruyter, 1999.
