= Distress (1946 film) =

1946 film

- Directed by: Robert-Paul Dagan
- Written by: Roger Ferdinand; Robert-Paul Dagan
- Based on: Odette by Victorien Sardou
- Produced by: Michel Manégat; René Grazi
- Starring: Jules Berry; Jean Mercanton; Gabrielle Dorziat
- Cinematography: Paul Cotteret
- Edited by: Maurice Bonin
- Music by: Henri Verdun
- Production company: Les Moulins d'Or
- Distributed by: Comptoir Français du Film
- Release date: 22 November 1946
- Running time: 95 minutes
- Country: France
- Language: French

Distress (French: Désarroi) is a 1946 French drama film directed by Robert-Paul Dagan and starring Jules Berry, Jean Mercanton and Gabrielle Dorziat. It is based on the 1881 play Odette by Victorien Sardou. The film's sets were designed by the art director Roland Quignon.

== Synopsis ==
The day before her wedding Martine discovers that her mother, who she had thought was dead, is an adventuress with a bad reputation who frequents casinos and nightclubs. Her prospective in-laws are horrified by this and want to call the whole wedding off.

== Cast ==
- Jules Berry as Frontenac
- Suzy Carrier as Martine
- Jean Debucourt as Clermont-Latour
- Gabrielle Dorziat as Mme Meillan
- Léonce Corne as Simonin
- Jean Mercanton as Pierre
- Valentine Tessier
- Tramel as Carrière
- Thérèse Aspar

== Bibliography ==
- Goble, Alan. The Complete Index to Literary Sources in Film. Walter de Gruyter, 1999.
