= East Lynne on the Western Front =

1931 film by George Pearson

- Directed by: George Pearson
- Written by: Mary Parsone; Donovan Parsons; Ellen Wood (novel)
- Produced by: T.A. Welsh
- Starring: Herbert Mundin; Mark Daly; Alf Goddard
- Cinematography: Percy Strong
- Production company: Gaumont British Picture Corporation
- Distributed by: Gaumont British Distributors
- Release date: 15 July 1931
- Running time: 85 minutes
- Country: United Kingdom
- Language: English

East Lynne on the Western Front is a 1931 British comedy film directed by George Pearson and starring Herbert Mundin, Mark Daly and Alf Goddard. It was made at the Lime Grove Studios.

== Plot ==
During the First World War a group of British soldiers serving on the Western Front stage a comic performance of the play East Lynne to entertain their comrades.

== Cast ==
- Herbert Mundin as Bob Cox / Lady Isobel
- Mark Daly as Maurice / Levison
- Alf Goddard as Ben / Cornelia
- Hugh E. Wright as Fred
- Edwin Ellis as Sam / Barbara Hare
- Harold French as Reggie Pitt
- Adele Blanche as Mimi
- Wilfrid Lawson as Dick Webb / Carlyle
- Escott Davies as Joe / Little Willie
- Roger Livesey as Sandy
- Philip Godfrey as Jack / Hare
- Norman Shelley as Tony Wilson

== Bibliography ==
- Low, Rachael. Filmmaking in 1930s Britain. George Allen & Unwin, 1985.
- Wood, Linda. British Films, 1927-1939. British Film Institute, 1986.
