= Emile de Ruelle =

American film editor (1880–1948)

- Born: 24 December 1880; St. Louis, Missouri; United States
- Died: 14 September 1948 (aged 67); Los Angeles, California; United States
- Occupation: Film Editor
- Years active: 1923–1938 (film)

Emile de Ruelle (14 December 1880 – 14 September 1948) was an American film editor known for his work in the British Film Industry, particularly with Alfred Hitchcock and Ewald André Dupont at British International Pictures.

== Selected filmography ==
- Paradise (1928)
- Weekend Wives (1928)
- Widecombe Fair (1928)
- The Manxman (1929)
- The Informer (1929)
- The Vagabond Queen (1929)
- Under the Greenwood Tree (1929)
- Atlantic (1929)
- Alf's Carpet (1929)
- Blackmail (1929)
- Juno and the Paycock (1930)
- Two Worlds (1930)
- The Middle Watch (1930)

== Bibliography ==
- St. Pierre, Paul Matthew. E.A. Dupont and his Contribution to British Film: Varieté, Moulin Rouge, Piccadilly, Atlantic, Two Worlds, Cape Forlorn. Fairleigh Dickinson University Press, 2010.
