= Georges Pallu =

French screenwriter and film director

- Born: 4 December 1869; Paris, France
- Died: 1 September 1948 (aged 78); Neuilly-Sur-Seine, France
- Other name: George Pallu
- Occupations: Director, Writer
- Years active: 1912–1939 (film)

Georges Pallu (1869–1948) was a French screenwriter and film director active in the silent and early sound eras. Pallu directed more than forty short and feature films during his career. He is also sometimes credited as George Pallu.

== Selected filmography ==
=== Director ===
- Cláudia (1923)
- Sister of Mercy (1929)
- Madelon's Daughter (1937)

== Bibliography ==
- Ann C. Paietta. Saints, Clergy and Other Religious Figures on Film and Television, 1895-2003. McFarland, 2005.
