= The Kiddies in the Ruins =

- Release date: 1918
- Country: United Kingdom

The Kiddies in the Ruins is a 1918 British silent war film directed by George Pearson and starring Emmy Lynn, Hugh E. Wright and Georges Colin. It was released two days after the Armistice that halted fighting in the First World War and depicts the lives of children living in war-devastated France.

== Cast ==
- Emmy Lynn as Françoise Regnard
- Hugh E. Wright as Tommy
- Georges Colin as Maurice Regnard
- Simone Prévost as Nini
- Georges Merouze as Grandpa
- Berthe Jalabert as Grandma

== Bibliography ==
- Kelly, Andrew. Cinema and the Great War. Routledge, 1997.
