= Hugh E. Wright =

British actor (1879–1940)

- Born: Hugh Esterel Wright; 13 April 1879; Cannes, Alpes-Maritimes, France
- Died: 12 February 1940 (aged 60); Windsor, Berkshire, England, UK
- Occupations: Actor & writer
- Years active: 1918-1939
- Children: Tony Wright

Hugh E. Wright (13 April 1879 – 12 February 1940) was a French-born, British actor and screenwriter. He was the father of actor Tony Wright.

== Musical theatre ==
- Charlot Revue (1925), as both lyricist (one song) and actor
- Houp La! (1916), as both writer and actor
- Follies (1910), as actor

== Filmography ==
=== Actor ===
- 1066: And All That (1939, TV film)
- The Knight of the Burning Pestle (1938, TV film)
- Royal Eagle (1936)
- Scrooge (1935)
- Widow's Might (1935)
- Adventure Ltd. (1935)
- Crazy People (1934)
- Get Your Man (1934)
- Nell Gwyn (1934)
- On the Air (1934)
- Radio Parade of 1935 (1934)
- A Shot in the Dark (1933)
- You Made Me Love You (1933)
- Cash (1933)
- The Good Companions (1933)
- The Love Wager (1933)
- My Old Duchess (1933)
- Lord Camber's Ladies (1932)
- Brother Alfred (1932)
- Pyjamas Preferred (1932)
- Stranglehold (1931)
- East Lynne on the Western Front (1931)
- Down River (1931)
- The Great Gay Road (1931)
- The Silver King (1929)
- Auld Lang Syne (1929)
- The Romany (1923)
- Squibs' Honeymoon (1923)
- Squibs M.P. (1923)
- A Sailor Tramp (1922)
- Squibs Wins the Calcutta Sweep (1922)
- Mary-Find-the-Gold (1921)
- The Old Curiosity Shop (1921)
- Squibs (1921)
- The Corner Man (1921)
- Garryowen (1920)
- Nothing Else Matters (1920)
- Hughie at the Victory Derby (1919)
- The Kiddies in the Ruins (1918)
- The Romance of Old Bill (1918)

=== Writer ===
- Auld Lang Syne (1929)
- Nothing Else Matters (1920)
- Hughie at the Victory Derby (1919)
