= Squibs Wins the Calcutta Sweep =

1922 film by George Pearson

Squibs Wins the Calcutta Sweep is a 1922 British silent comedy film directed by George Pearson and starring Betty Balfour, Fred Groves and Hugh E. Wright. It was the sequel to the 1921 film Squibs.

== Premise ==
Squibs wins a large sum of money on a horse race.

== Cast ==
- Betty Balfour - Squibs Hopkins
- Fred Groves - P. C. Lee
- Hugh E. Wright - Sam Hopkins
- Bertram Burleigh - The Weasel
- Annette Benson - Ivy Hopkins
- Mary Brough - Mrs Lee
- Hal Martin - Detective
- Donald Searle - Reporter
- Tom Morris - Bob
- Sam Lewis - Nosey
- Ambrose Manning - Mr Lee
