= Eliot Stannard =

English screenwriter (1888–1944)

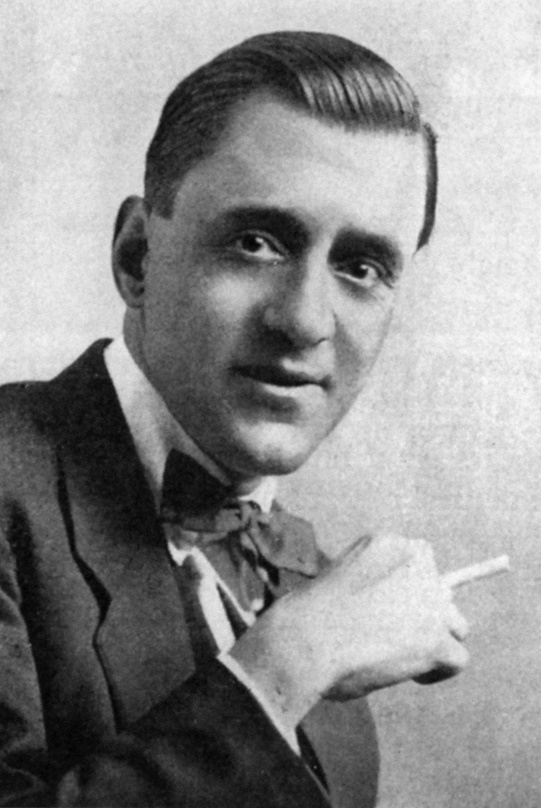
- Stannard in the 1920s
- Born: 1 March 1888; Wandsworth, London, England
- Died: 21 November 1944 (aged 56); Kensington, London, England
- Occupation: Screenwriter
- Years active: 1914–1933
- Mother: Henrietta Eliza Vaughan Palmer

Eliot Stannard (1 March 1888 – 21 November 1944) was an English screenwriter and director. He was the son of civil engineer Arthur Stannard and Yorkshire-born novelist Henrietta Eliza Vaughan Stannard. Stannard wrote or assisted with the screenplays of possibly over 400 films between 1914 and 1933, including the eight fully-silent films directed by Alfred Hitchcock, and also directed five films himself.

During the early 1920s, he worked on most of the screenplays for the Ideal Film Company, one of Britain's leading silent film studios. Despite being one of Britain's most prolific screenwriters, Stannard disappeared from the film industry in 1933 and little is known of his last decade, although there have been general appeals for more information concerning this period.

== Partial filmography ==
- The Idol of Paris (1914)
- Florence Nightingale (1915)
- The Mystery of a Hansom Cab (1915)
- Profit and the Loss (1917)
- Justice (1917)
- Tom Jones (1917)
- God and the Man (1918)
- Hindle Wakes (1918)
- Nelson (1918)
- The Toilers (1919)
- The Artistic Temperament (1919)
- Mr. Gilfil's Love Story (1920)
- The Twelve Pound Look (1920)
- Build Thy House (1920)
- Wuthering Heights (1920)
- The Will (1921)
- The Old Country (1921)
- Belphegor the Mountebank (1921)
- The Little Hour of Peter Wells (1921)
- The Prince and the Beggarmaid (1921)
- The Bachelor's Club (1921)
- The Adventures of Mr. Pickwick (1921)
- Her Penalty (1921)
- A Master of Craft (1922)
- Mord Em'ly (1922)
- The Pauper Millionaire (1922)
- A Sailor Tramp (1922)
- The Romany (1923)
- Heartstrings (1923)
- Paddy the Next Best Thing (1923)
- Hutch Stirs 'em Up (1923)
- The Fair Maid of Perth (1923)
- Becket (1924)
- The Loves of Colleen Bawn (1924)
- Hurricane Hutch in Many Adventures (1924)
- Wanted, a Boy (1924)
- The Gay Corinthian (1924)
- Love and Hate (1924)
- Chappy - That's All (1924)
- Settled Out of Court (1925)
- The Pleasure Garden (1925)
- The Mountain Eagle (1926), a lost film
- White Heat (1926)
- The Lodger: A Story of the London Fog (1927)
- Blighty (1927)
- Downhill (1927)
- Sailors Don't Care (1928)
- The Farmer's Wife (1928)
- Easy Virtue (1928)
- Tommy Atkins (1928)
- Champagne (1928)
- Not Quite a Lady (1928)
- The Vortex (1928)
- Young Woodley (1928)
- Widecombe Fair (1928)
- The Manxman (1929)
- The Hate Ship (1929)
- The American Prisoner (1929)
- A Safe Affair (1931)
- The Officers' Mess (1931)
- Above Rubies (1932)
- To Brighton with Gladys (1933)
