= Bright Eyes (1929 film) =

1929 British film by Géza von Bolváry

- French poster
- Directed by: Géza von Bolváry
- Written by: Katherine Reeves; Franz Schulz
- Starring: Betty Balfour; Jack Trevor; Fritz Greiner; Marcel Vibert
- Cinematography: Max Nekut; Theodor Sparkuhl
- Edited by: Daisy Saunders
- Music by: Phil Cardew; Leo T. Croke
- Production companies: British International Pictures; Sascha Film
- Distributed by: British International Pictures; Südfilm
- Release date: 29 March 1929
- Running time: 85 minutes
- Countries: Austria; United Kingdom
- Languages: Silent; German intertitles

Bright Eyes is a 1929 British-Austrian silent romance film directed by Géza von Bolváry and starring Betty Balfour, Jack Trevor, and Fritz Greiner. It is also known under the alternative title of Champagner.

The film was a co-production between British International Pictures and Sascha-Film. Bolváry directed the film after travelling to Britain to make The Wrecker and stayed on to make another film, The Vagabond Queen, before returning to Germany.

== Cast ==
- Betty Balfour as Jenny
- Jack Trevor as Jean
- Fritz Greiner as Henri
- Marcel Vibert as Miguel Gomez
- Vivian Gibson as Lola
- Otto Hartmann as Marcel

== Bibliography ==
- Bergfelder, Tim; Cargnelli, Christian, eds. (2008). Destination London: German-Speaking Emigrés and British Cinema, 1925–1950. New York: Berghahn Books. ISBN 978-0-85745-019-7.
