= 29 Acacia Avenue =

Play and 1945 film directed by Henry Cass

- Directed by: Henry Cass
- Written by: Denis and Mabel Constanduros (play); Muriel and Sydney Box (screenplay)
- Produced by: Sydney Box
- Starring: Gordon Harker; Betty Balfour; Jimmy Hanley; Hubert Gregg; Jill Evans; Henry Kendall; Dinah Sheridan; Megs Jenkins; Noele Gordon; Guy Middleton
- Cinematography: Ernest Palmer; Robert Huke
- Edited by: Julian Wintle
- Music by: Muir Mathieson (musical director)
- Production companies: Columbia British Productions; Boca Productions
- Distributed by: Columbia Pictures Corporation (United Kingdom); Oxford Films (United States)
- Release dates: May 1945 (UK); 30 October 1949 (US)
- Running time: 83 minutes
- Country: United Kingdom
- Language: English
- Budget: £30,000 or £45,000

29 Acacia Avenue (U.S. title: The Facts of Love) is a 1945 British comedy-drama film directed by Henry Cass and starring Gordon Harker, Betty Balfour and Jimmy Hanley. It was written by Muriel and Sydney Box based on the 1944 play by Denis and Mabel Constanduros.

== Plot ==
Peter Robinson falls in love with the naïve country girl Fay and the worldly, wealthy and already-married Joan, and lives with them both (and Joan's husband) at his parents' house. However, one day Peter's parents unexpectedly return from holiday, and all hell breaks loose.

== Cast ==
- Gordon Harker as Mr. Robinson
- Betty Balfour as Mrs. Robinson
- Jimmy Hanley as Peter Robinson
- Carla Lehmann as Fay
- Hubert Gregg as Michael
- Jill Evans as Joan
- Henry Kendall as Mr. Wilson
- Dinah Sheridan as Pepper
- Megs Jenkins as Shirley
- Noele Gordon as Mrs. Wilson
- Guy Middleton as Gerald
- Aubrey Mallalieu as Martin

== Critical reception ==
The Monthly Film Bulletin wrote: "Chief achievement of this film is its atmosphere of suburbia. In construction and treatment the technique is more of stage than of screen. That is true of the direction and photography, which are both otherwise competent. It is also true of the dialogue, which has a recognizable Constanduros flavour. And it is true of the acting. Harker and Betty Balfour, as Mr and Mrs. Robinson, and Jimmy Hanley, as their son, give the most satisfying of these performances. With better handling we may expect much more from young Jill Evans (Joan). Most audiences will be surprised by the uninhibited suggestions of sex; for, however true to life they may or may not be, they would certainly not have passed the Hayes office."

Kine Weekly wrote: "There is some wit and no little truth in the hectic happenings, but nevertheless there are times when the frankness of its situations and dialogue is a trifle embarrassing. Although of the family, it is definitely not for the family. All the same, it should tickle industrial audiences. Its title and star values are, of course, good. Potential turn-up for the stout-hearted and broad-minded 'populars'."

Sky Movies called the film "one wartime West End success that didn't transfer too well to screen, ending up embarrassingly stagey."

The Radio Times thought that although the film "fails to fully disguise its theatrical origins...it nevertheless makes for pleasant period entertainment, with particularly likeable performances from British veterans Gordon Harker and Betty Balfour as the parents."
