= Wallace Douglas =

Canadian actor (1911–1990)

Wallace Stuart Finlayson (15 August 1911 in Winnipeg, Manitoba, Canada – 8 August 1990 Coldwaltham, West Sussex, England), known as Wallace Douglas, was a Canadian producer, director and actor.

He married four times, to Pamela Frost, Anne Crawford, Phillippa Avril Kennedy and Peggy Chester.

Douglas was a second lieutenant in the 60th Rifles during the Second World War and was declared missing in action at Calais in 1940. He was later reported to be a prisoner.

== Selected filmography ==
- The Love Wager (1933)
- Music Hath Charms (1935)
- Mother, Don't Rush Me (1936)
- The Last Adventurers (1937)
- The Chinese Bungalow (1940)
- Spies of the Air (1940)
