= Miarka (1920 film) =

1920 film directed by Louis Mercanton

- French: Miarka, la fille à l'ourse
- Directed by: Louis Mercanton
- Written by: Jean Richepin (novel)
- Produced by: Louis Mercanton
- Starring: Desdemona Mazza; Jean Mercanton; Marie Grisier-Montbazon; Ivor Novello; Paul Numa; Jean Richepin; Gabrielle Réjane; Charles Vanel
- Production company: Mercanton Films
- Distributed by: Mercanton Films
- Release date: 29 October 1920
- Country: France
- Languages: Silent; French intertitles

Miarka or Miarka: The Daughter of the Bear (French: Miarka, la fille à l'ourse) is a 1920 French silent drama film directed by Louis Mercanton and starring Ivor Novello. The film is also known by the alternative title of Gypsy Passion. It was shot on location in the Camargue region. It was based on a novel by Jean Richepin which had previously been made into the libretto for an opera, Miarka, was later turned into a sound film of the same name.

== Plot ==
As described in a film magazine, Romany Kate, a gypsy, and her granddaughter Miarka (Mazza) live in the abandoned ruins of an old castle and in the shadow of a modern mansion. The owner of the estate is making a study of gypsy life and writing a book on the subject. He has stolen a manuscript from Romany Kate's wagon and is having it translated. Louis, the gamekeeper, seeks Miarka's hand but Romany Kate plans to have her granddaughter marry the head of the gypsy tribe. Ivor (Novello), nephew of their wealthy benefactor, also falls in love with Miarka. Louis accuses Romany Kate of setting a fire to the mansion and she is locked up. He then attempts to drug Miarka, but her pet bear Pouzzli attacks Louis and kills him. As he dies, he confesses that stole from his employer and tried to hide the crime. Ivor is then found to be a chief of a branch of the nomads, and Romany Kate gives her consent to Miarka's marriage.

== Cast ==
- Desdemona Mazza as Miarka
- Jean Mercanton
- Marie Grisier-Montbazon
- Ivor Novello as Ivor
- Paul Numa
- Jean Richepin as Lord
- Gabrielle Réjane as Vougne
- Charles Vanel as Mario, the game warden
