= The Fish Woman =

1932 film directed by Louis Mercanton

- Directed by: Louis Mercanton
- Written by: Marc-Hély
- Starring: Jeanne Fusier-Gir
- Release date: 1932
- Country: France
- Language: French

The Fish Woman (French: La femme-poisson) is a 1932 French film directed by Louis Mercanton and starring Jeanne Fusier-Gir, Marc-Hély and Louis Sindrin.

== Cast ==
- Jeanne Fusier-Gir
- Marc-Hély
- Louis Sindrin
- Louis Mercanton

== Bibliography ==
- Olivier Barrot & Raymond Chirat. Noir et blanc: 250 acteurs du cinéma français, 1930-1960. Flammarion, 2000.
