= Michèle Verly =

French actress (1909–1952)

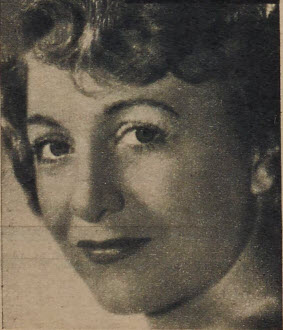
- Born: Michèle Armande Houillon; 19 July 1909; 8th arrondissement of Paris
- Died: 3 March 1952 (aged 42); Nice (Alpes-Maritimes)
- Occupations: Stage and film actress

Michèle Verly (real name Michèle Armande Houillon; 19 July 1909 – 3 March 1952) was a French stage and film actress. She was managing director of the Théâtre Gramont from August 1945 until her death. She died in the 1952 Air France SNCASE Languedoc crash and is buried in the Batignolles Cemetery (31st division) in Paris.

== Filmography ==
- 1926 : La Tournée Farigoule by Marcel Manchez
- 1927 : Belphégor by Henri Desfontaines (film in 4 episodes)
- 1927 : La Grande Épreuve by Alexandre Ryder and A. Dugès
- 1927 : Madonna of the Sleeping Cars by Marco de Gastyne and Maurice Gleize
- 1928 : The Passenger by Jacques de Baroncelli
- 1928 : La Symphonie pathétique by Henri Étiévant and Mario Nalpas
- 1929 : Monte Cristo by Henri Fescourt (film shot in two periods)
- 1929 : Fécondité by Henri Étiévant and Nikolai Evreinov
- 1929 : La Maison des hommes vivants by Marcel Dumont
- 1929 : Les Taciturnes by Jacques de Casembroot
- 1930 : Our Masters, the Servants
- 1931 : Nos maîtres les domestiques by Grantham Hayes
- 1932 : The Chocolate Girl by Marc Allégret
- 1932 : Le Chien qui parle by Robert Rips (short film)
- 1934 : The Lady of Lebanon by Jean Epstein : Christian Matras
- 1934 : Your Smile by Monty Banks and Pierre Caron
- 1935 : Mon curé fait des miracles by Albert Depont (moyen métrage)
- 1936 : La Belle Équipe by Julien Duvivier
- 1939 : L'Embuscade by Fernand Rivers

== Theatre ==
Comedian

- 1935 : Margot by Édouard Bourdet, directed by Pierre Fresnay, Théâtre Marigny
- 1949 : Les Bonnes Cartes by Marcel Thiébaut, directed by Pierre Bertin, Théâtre Gramont
- 1950 : Va faire un tour au bois by Roger Dornès, directed by Roland Piétri, Théâtre Gramont

Theatre director

- 1948 : La Ligne de chance by Albert Husson, Théâtre Gramont
- 1950 : Mon ami le cambrioleur by André Haguet, Théâtre Gramont
