= Venus (1929 film) =

1929 film directed by Louis Mercanton

- Theatrical release poster
- Directed by: Louis Mercanton
- Written by: Jean Vignaud (story); Adrien Gaillard
- Produced by: Louis Mercanton
- Starring: Constance Talmadge; André Roanne; Jean Murat
- Cinematography: Léonce-Henri Burel
- Production company: Mercanton Films
- Distributed by: Les Artistes Associés
- Release date: 29 September 1929
- Country: France
- Languages: Sound (Synchronized); French Intertitles

Venus (French: Vénus) is a 1929 French sound drama film directed by Louis Mercanton, and starring Constance Talmadge, André Roanne, and Jean Murat. While the film has no audible dialog, it was released with a synchronized musical score with sound effects using both the sound-on-disc and sound-on-film process. It is based on a story by Jean Vignaud. An English version was distributed by United Artists in the United States.

== Cast ==
- Constance Talmadge as Princess Beatrice Doriani
- André Roanne
- Jean Murat as Le capitaine Franqueville
- Max Maxudian as Le prince Mario Zarkis
- Charles Frank
- Louis Baron fils as Le capitaine de Venus
- Frédéric Mariotti as Le chef des dockers
- Jean Mercanton as L'enfant
- Maurice Schutz
- Julio de Romero
- Anthony Hankey
- Desdemona Mazza

== See also ==
- List of early sound feature films (1926–1929)

== Bibliography ==
- Goble, Alan. The Complete Index to Literary Sources in Film. Walter de Gruyter, 1999.
