= The Maid at the Palace =

1927 film directed by Louis Mercanton

- Directed by: Louis Mercanton
- Written by: Louis Mercanton; Fred Wright
- Starring: Betty Balfour; Lucy Sibley; Irene Tripod
- Cinematography: Percy Strong; Wladimir
- Production company: Société des Films Mercanton
- Distributed by: Pathé Consortium Cinéma
- Release date: 21 January 1927
- Country: France
- Languages: Silent; French intertitles

The Maid at the Palace (French: La petite bonne du palace) is a 1927 French silent film directed by Louis Mercanton and starring Betty Balfour, Lucy Sibley and Irene Tripod.

== Cast ==
- Betty Balfour as Betty Cinders
- Lucy Sibley as Mme Catchpole
- Irene Tripod as Pensionnaire / Guest
- Henriette Clairval-Terof as Gouvernante / Governess
- André Roanne as Richard Dalroy
- Fred Wright as Professeur Potrefax
- Louis Baron fils as Signor Ferraro
- Albert Decoeur as Le maître d'hôtel
- Louis Mercanton as Chef
- Jean Mercanton as Groom / Bellboy
- Georges Bernier as Le plongeur / Dishwasher
- Ernest Chambery as Valet
- [A.G. Poulton
- Julio de Romero

== Bibliography ==
- John Holmstrom. The moving picture boy: an international encyclopaedia from 1895 to 1995. Michael Russell, 1996.
