= The Nipper =

1930 film directed by Louis Mercanton

- Trade advertisement
- Directed by: Louis Mercanton
- Screenplay by: Donovan Parsons
- Based on: play by Michael Carre and A. Acrement
- Cinematography: René Guissart
- Production company: Betty Balfour Pictures
- Release date: 1930
- Running time: 81 minutes
- Country: United Kingdom
- Language: English

The Nipper (also known as The Brat) is a 1930 British musical film directed by Louis Mercanton and starring Betty Balfour, John Stuart, and Anne Grey. It was written by Donovan Parsons from the French play La Mome by Michael Carre and A. Acrement.

== Preservation status ==
The British Film Institute National Archive holds a collection of ephemera and stills but no film or video materials.

== Plot ==
Convict's daughter "The Nipper" is a popular singer in a pub. When her guardian persuades her to help him rob a house, she is caught and taken captive by Max Nicholson, a songwriter. They fall in love. As they are about to emark for America, she realises she is stealing Max from his fiancée Clarissa. She returns to the pub, and marries the landlord.

== Cast ==
- Betty Balfour as The Nipper
- John Stuart as Max Nicholson
- Anne Grey as Clarissa Wentworth
- Alf Goddard as Alf Green
- Gibb McLaughlin as Bill Henshaw
- Percy Parsons as Joubert
- Helen Haye as Lady Sevenoaks
- Louis Goodrich as Woolf

== Reception ==
Film Weekly wrote: "This is a typical Betty Balfour story but it has been scrappily handled. Betty herself does not seem to fall so readily as she used to do into the part of the mercurial Cockney, There is, too, an 'out-of-date' air about the film, which is probably the sum of the other weaknesses. Faithful Balfour admirers will find it much to their liking."

Kine Weekly wrote: "Here again are the sort of Cockney witticisms and characterisation which suits the deservedly popular British star. One feels she is at home in it, and since she is aamirably supported by the cast there is little doubt that her first venture in her own production will find wide popular favour. ... Betty Balfour is full of her old high spirits, and introduces some of her clever burlesques. ... Louis Mercanton's production is adapted from French story 'La Mome,' so that one feels a good deal of credit should go to the adaptor, Donovan Parsons; certainly an excellent Cockney atmosphere has been captured, and the gags are really funny. The director is not always as polished as he might have been, and there are moments, especially the sentimental ones, which are apt to be wearisome."
