= Harry Terry =

English actor (1887–?)

- Harry Terry in The Vagabond Queen (1929)
- Born: 1887; London, England
- Died: Unknown
- Occupation: Actor
- Years active: 1900–1952

Harry Terry (born 1887, date of death unknown) was an English stage and film actor. He made his stage debut in 1900, and appeared in more than 60 films between 1927 and 1952, including two films directed by Alfred Hitchcock. He was born in London.

== Selected filmography ==
- The Ring (1927)
- Cocktails (1928)
- The Return of the Rat (1929)
- The Manxman (1929)
- The American Prisoner (1929)
- Night Birds (1930)
- Third Time Lucky (1931)
- The Sleeping Cardinal (1931)
- Reunion (1932)
- I'm an Explosive (1933)
- The Broken Melody (1934)
- Music Hall (1934)
- The Unholy Quest (1934)
- The Crimes of Stephen Hawke (1936)
- Feather Your Nest (1937)
- The Penny Pool (1937)
- Trouble Brewing (1939)
- The Face at the Window (1939)
- Cheer Boys Cheer (1939)
- Jailbirds (1940)
- The Man at the Gate (1941)
- Here Comes the Sun (1946)
- Fame Is the Spur (1947)
