= Paradise (1928 film) =

1928 film

- Directed by: Denison Clift
- Written by: Philip Gibbs; Violet E. Powell
- Starring: Betty Balfour; Joseph Striker; Alexander D'Arcy; Winter Hall
- Cinematography: René Guissart
- Edited by: Emile de Ruelle
- Production company: British International Pictures
- Distributed by: Wardour Films
- Release date: 10 September 1928
- Running time: 7,246 feet
- Country: United Kingdom
- Languages: Silent; English intertitles

Paradise is a 1928 British silent drama film directed by Denison Clift and starring Betty Balfour, Joseph Striker and Alexander D'Arcy. The screenplay concerns a clergyman's daughter who wins £500, and decides to take a holiday on the French Riviera. There she became ensnared by a foreign fortune hunter, but her true love comes and rescues her.

== Cast ==
- Betty Balfour as Kitty Cranston
- Joseph Striker as Dr. John Halliday
- Alexander D'Arcy as Spirdoff
- Winter Hall as Reverend Cranston
- Barbara Gott as Lady Liverage
- Dino Galvani as Manager
- Boris Ranevsky as Commissionaire
- Albert Brouett as Detective
- Ina De La Haye as Douchka

== Bibliography ==
- Low, Rachel. The History of British Film: Volume IV, 1918–1929. Routledge, 1997.
