= Edward Sorley =

British actor (1871–1933)

Edward Sorley (1871 – 16 October 1933) was a British actor.

Sorley was born in Camberwell, Surrey and died at age 62 in Blackheath, London.

== Selected filmography ==
- Queen's Evidence (1919)
- The Temptress (1920)
- The Sword of Damocles (1920)
- The Night Hawk (1921)
- Mord Em'ly (1922)
- The Loves of Mary, Queen of Scots (1923)
- Bulldog Drummond's Third Round (1925)
- Nell Gwyn (1926)
- Dawn (1928)
