= Champagne (1928 film) =

1928 British film by Alfred Hitchcock

- Australian daybill poster
- Directed by: Alfred Hitchcock
- Screenplay by: Alfred Hitchcock; Eliot Stannard
- Story by: Walter C. Mycroft
- Produced by: John Maxwell
- Starring: Betty Balfour; Jean Bradin; Gordon Harker; Ferdinand von Alten
- Cinematography: Jack E. Cox
- Edited by: Alfred Hitchcock
- Production company: British International Pictures
- Distributed by: Wardour Films (UK)
- Release date: 20 August 1928 (UK)
- Running time: 90 minutes (preserved version); 105 minutes (2012 restoration)
- Country: United Kingdom
- Language: silent film with English intertitles

Champagne is a 1928 British silent comedy film directed by Alfred Hitchcock and starring Betty Balfour, Gordon Harker and Jean Bradin. The screenplay was based on an original story by writer and critic Walter C. Mycroft. The plot concerns a young woman forced to take a job after her father loses his fortune.

== Plot ==
Champagne (1928)

Heiress Betty Balfour draws the ire of her father after using his aeroplane to fly to meet her boyfriend, who is aboard an ocean liner headed to France. Betty's boyfriend becomes seasick, so she must attend dinner alone, where she meets a mysterious man. She receives a telegram from her disapproving father, who warns that her boyfriend will not be admired by her friends. To prove her father wrong, she asks her boyfriend to marry her. However, he resents her control of their relationship, and they quarrel and part company.

The boyfriend regrets the fight and locates Betty to apologise, but he finds her playing chess with the mysterious man. The boyfriend and Betty quarrel again. Betty's father arrives and informs her that the family fortune from the champagne business has been lost. When the boyfriend leaves after hearing the news, Betty's father believes it to be proof that the boyfriend is only interested in her money.

In France, Betty is robbed of her jewellery and is penniless. She and her father take a small, dilapidated apartment. Her boyfriend again attempts to reconcile with her, but she rebukes him and vows to find a job.

Betty finds work at an upmarket restaurant. The mysterious man appears and invites her to his table. When her boyfriend arrives, the man leaves after handing her a note advising her to call him if she ever needs help. The boyfriend disapproves of Betty's job and departs after Betty dances wildly in order to provoke him.

The boyfriend soon returns with Betty's father, who is outraged about the lowly job and confesses that he had lied about the loss of their fortune in order to teach her a lesson. Angry with both men, she contacts the mysterious man, who offers to take her back to America. Betty accepts but is later horrified to discover that she has been locked in her cabin. She imagines the worst about the mysterious man's intentions and is relieved when her boyfriend arrives and releases her, and they soon reconcile.

The boyfriend hides in the bathroom when they hear the mysterious man approaching. He enters with Betty's father, who confesses that he had hired the man to follow and protect her. The boyfriend is furious and, misunderstanding the situation, bursts from his hiding place to attack the man. Betty's father calms the boyfriend by telling him that he no longer disapproves of their wedding. The reunited couple begin to discuss the wedding but soon bicker over the arrangements.

== Cast ==
- Betty Balfour – Betty
- Jean Bradin – The Boy
- Gordon Harker – Mark, Betty's Father
- Ferdinand von Alten – The Man (as Theo von Alten)

Supporting cast, all uncredited:

- Jack Trevor – The Officer
- Claude Hulbert – Club Guest
- Marcel Vibert – Maitre d'Hotel
- Hannah Jones – Club Servant
- Clifford Heatherley – The Manager
- Vivian Gibson
- Sunday Wilshin
- Phyllis Konstam
- Alexander D'Arcy
- Fanny Wright
- Gwen Mannering
- Balliol and Merton

== Reception ==
Champagne, Alfred Hitchcock's second comedy following the critical and commercial success of The Farmer's Wife, was poorly received. Although his expanding visual technique continued to draw recognition and praise, critics lamented the film's lack of an engaging plot.

Variety, although impressed with the technical aspects, was dismissive of the film. The reviewer wrote: "The story is of the weakest, an excuse for covering 7,000 feet of harmless celluloid with legs and close-ups."

Hitchcock later voiced his unhappiness with the film in François Truffaut's book-length interview Hitchcock/Truffaut, in which he said that the film had no story to tell.

== Preservation status and home media ==
A restoration of Champagne was completed in 2012 as part of the BFI's £2 million "Save the Hitchcock 9" project to restore all of Hitchcock's surviving silent films.

Restored releases have appeared on DVD, Blu-ray and video-on-demand from Optimum in the UK, Lionsgate and Kino Lorber in the U.S. and many others.

On 1 January 2024, Champagne entered the public domain in the United States.
