= Abdulla the Great =

1955 film

- French film poster
- Directed by: Gregory Ratoff
- Written by: Boris Ingster; George St. George
- Based on: My Kingdom for a Woman by Ismet Regeila
- Produced by: Gregory Ratoff
- Starring: Gregory Ratoff; Kay Kendall; Sydney Chaplin; Alexander D'Arcy; Marina Berti
- Cinematography: Lee Garmes; Lambert Williamson
- Edited by: Maurice Rootes
- Music by: Georges Auric; Lambert Williamson
- Production companies: Misr Universal Cairo; Sphinx Films
- Distributed by: British Lion Films
- Release date: 16 February 1955 (Finland)
- Running time: 103 minutes
- Countries: United Kingdom; Egypt
- Language: English
- Budget: $1.2 million

Abdulla the Great (also known as Abdullah's Harem) is a 1955 comedy film. It was directed and produced by Gregory Ratoff who also stars in the title role from a screenplay by Boris Ingster and George St. George, based on the novel My Kingdom for a Woman by Ismet Regeila. The music score was by Georges Auric and the cinematography by Lee Garmes.

The film stars Gregory Ratoff, Kay Kendall, Sydney Chaplin, Alexander D'Arcy and Marina Berti. Ratoff denied that the story was a thinly veiled parody of the life of King Farouk of Egypt and the events preceding his overthrow in 1952.

== Plot ==
The film is set in Bandaria, a Middle Eastern country whose absolute ruler, Abdullah, lives a life of great luxury, surrounded by lovely women. When Ronnie, a beautiful English model, arrives, Abdullah falls for her and offers her great riches. She resists his advances as she is more interested in Ahmed, an officer in the King's army. While this is going on, Abdullah is unaware of the growing discontent among his subjects which threatens to overthrow him.

== Cast ==
- Gregory Ratoff as Abdulla
- Kay Kendall as Ronnie
- Sydney Chaplin as Ahmed
- Alexander D'Arcy as Marco
- Marina Berti as Aziza
- Mary Costes as the countess
- Marti Stevens as singer

== Reception ==
The Monthly Film Bulletin wrote: "Abdulla the Grear achieves a certain dubious topicality in the obvious invitation to "identify" its central character. The story itself, however, with its polyglot accents, lavish settings and undulating dancing girls, belongs firmly to the Hollywood tradition. Gregory Ratoff, the director/star, makes Abdulla a convincingly repellent figure, being more successful in the earlier satirical scenes than at the end, when his playing unwisely takes on a Jannings-like intensity. Kay Kendall, as the unwilling favourite, is most persuasive when railing against Abdulla's lecherous advances."

Variety wrote: "Platitudinous dialog and complications do not help matters as the film vacillates between the comic and serious. The obvious story line, stilted direction and routine acting relegate this for exploitation playdates."
