= T.A. Welsh =

British film producer

Thomas Welsh (frequently known as T.A. Welsh) was a British film producer. Along with George Pearson he was one of the co-owners of Welsh-Pearson, a leading British company of the late silent era. The company made many popular hits at its Craven Park Studios during the 1920s.

== Selected filmography ==
- Squibs' Honeymoon (1923)
- East Lynne on the Western Front (1931)
- Shipmates o' Mine (1936)

== Bibliography ==
- Low, Rachael. The History of the British Film, 1918-1929. George Allen & Unwin, 1971.
- Warren, Patricia. British Film Studios: An Illustrated History. Batsford, 2001.
