= Alexander D'Arcy =

Egyptian actor (1908–1996)

- ألكسندر دارسي
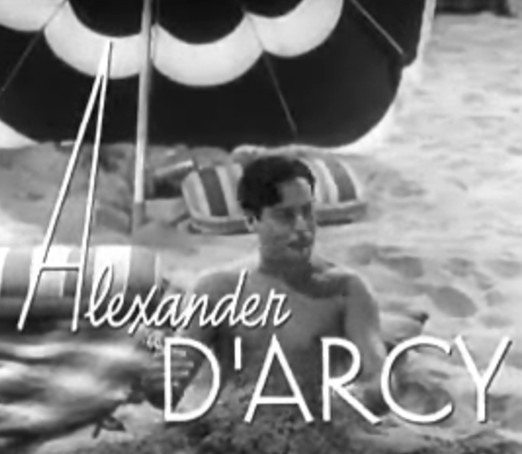
- D'Arcy in the trailer for Topper Takes a Trip (1939)
- Born: Alexandre Sarruf; 10 August 1908; Cairo, Egypt
- Died: 20 April 1996 (aged 87); West Hollywood, California, U.S.
- Other name: Joseph Alexandre Fabre
- Occupation: Actor
- Years active: 1927–1973
- Spouses: Arleen Whelan (m. 1940; div. 1943) Yutta Darcy (m. 1964; div. 1973)
- Children: 1

Alexander D'Arcy (Arabic: ألكسندر دارسي; born Alexandre Sarruf, Arabic: ألكسندر صروف; 10 August 1908 – 20 April 1996) was an Egyptian-American actor with an international film repertoire. He often portrayed a suave gentleman or smooth rogue, and at one time was pinned as the natural successor to Rudolph Valentino.

== Career ==
Born Alexandre Sarruf in Cairo, Egypt, D'Arcy, variously credited as Alexandre D'Arcy, Alex D'Arcy, Alexandre Darcy and Alex d'Arcy, appeared in some 45 films, mostly as a suave gentleman or smooth rogue. His first film appearance was in 1927 in The Garden of Allah, and he then appeared in Alfred Hitchcock's Champagne (1928). He went to France, acted in a number of films, then departed for America. In 1936, listed as Joseph Alexandre Fabre – artist, aged 27, race French, nationality Egyptian – he sailed to New York as a first class passenger on the SS Île de France. He eventually left New York for Hollywood where he started by playing supporting roles in several films in the late 1930s, including The Prisoner of Zenda, Stolen Holiday, and The Awful Truth (all 1937). In 1953, he was one of the suitors of Marilyn Monroe's character in How to Marry a Millionaire and featured in Abdulla the Great and Soldier of Fortune in 1955.

His roles diminished in importance, and by the 1960s, he acted mostly on television and resurfaced in horror films, notably It's Hot in Paradise (1962) and as Dracula in Blood of Dracula's Castle (1969). Evidently a favorite of such cult directors as Roger Corman, Russ Meyer and Sam Fuller, D'Arcy was seen in Corman's The St. Valentine's Day Massacre (1967), Meyer's The Seven Minutes (1971) and Fuller's Dead Pigeon on Beethoven Street (1972 or 1974 TV movie).

Throughout his life, D'Arcy split his time between his homes in the United States and Europe. In addition to acting, he worked as a restaurateur in Berlin. He was naturalized as a United States citizen in Los Angeles in May 1942. In his petition for naturalization, he declared that upon naturalization he wished his name to be legally changed from Joseph Alexandre Fabre to Alexander D'Arcy.

== Personal life ==
D'Arcy was married twice, first to actress Arleen Whelan and then, in 1964, to actress Yutta Darcy. He adopted Yutta's daughter named Susannah D'Arcy and divorced in 1973.

== Death ==
D'Arcy died on 20 April 1996 at his home in West Hollywood, California at the age of 87, from natural causes.

== Filmography ==
- The Garden of Allah (1927) - Bit Role (uncredited)
- Champagne (1928) - (uncredited)
- Paradise (1928) - Spirdoff
- Daughter of the Regiment (1929)
- A Romance of Seville (1929) - Ramon Dunigo
- La revanche du maudit (1930) - Edmond Saint-Edme
- À Nous la Liberté (1931) - Le gigolo (uncredited)
- King of the Hotel (1932) - Alonzo
- That Scoundrel Morin (1932)
- Je vous aimerai toujours (1933) - Jean-Claude
- Poliche (1934) - Saint-Wast
- La Kermesse héroïque (Carnival in Flanders) (1935) - Le capitaine / The Captain
- Stolen Holiday (1937) - Anatole
- The Prisoner of Zenda (1937) - De Gautet (uncredited)
- The Awful Truth (1937) - Armand Duvalle
- She Married an Artist (1937) - Phillip Corval
- Women Are Like That (1938) - Paul - a Headwaiter (uncredited)
- Flight to Fame (1938) - Perez
- Topper Takes a Trip (1938) - Baron
- Good Girls Go to Paris (1939) - Paul Kingston
- Rhumba Rhythm at the Hollywood La Conga (1939, Short) - Himself (cameo)
- Fifth Avenue Girl (1939) - Maitre d'Hotel
- Three Sons (1939) - Prince Nicky - Phoebe's Husband
- Another Thin Man (1939) - Gigolo Who Danced with Nora Charles at West Indies Club (scenes deleted)
- City of Chance (1940) - Baron Joseph
- Irene (1940) - Mr. Dumont (uncredited)
- The Blonde from Singapore (1941) - Prince Sali
- Marriage Is a Private Affair (1944) - Mr. Garby (uncredited)
- The Red Angel (1949) - Ocelli
- Harriet Quimby (1952, TV Movie) - Andre Houpert
- Man on a Tightrope (1953) - Rudolph
- Vicki (1953) - Robin Ray
- How to Marry a Millionaire (1953) - J. Stewart Merrill
- Les clandestines (1954) - Louis d'Osterkoff
- Abdulla the Great, aka Abdullah's Harem (1955) - Marco
- Soldier of Fortune (1955) - Rene Dupont Chevalier
- Horrors of Spider Island (Ein Toter hing im Netz) (1960) - Gary Webster
- The Festival Girls (1961) - Larry Worthington
- Casanova wider Willen (1964, TV Movie) - Jack Perri
- Fanny Hill (1964) - Admiral
- The Incredible Sex Revolution (1965) - Pierre
- Way...Way Out (1966) - Deuce Hawkins
- The St. Valentine's Day Massacre (1967) - Joe Aiello
- Blood of Dracula's Castle (1969) - Count Dracula - alias Count Charles Townsend
- The Seven Minutes (1971) - Christian Leroux
- Tatort (1973, TV Series, episode: Tote Taube in der Beethovenstraße) (1973) - Mr. Novak
