= The Manxman (1929 film) =

1929 film

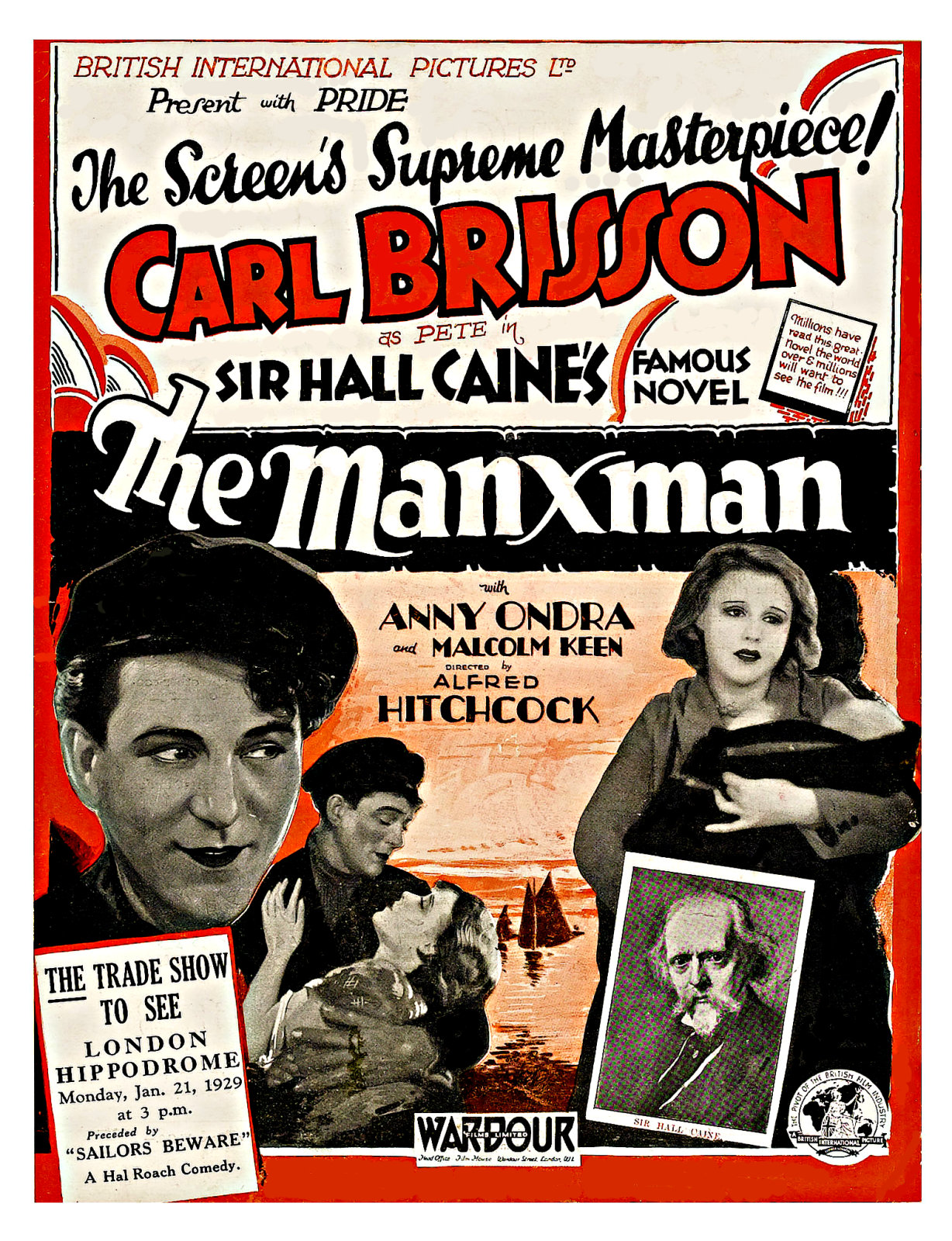
- Theatrical poster
- Directed by: Alfred Hitchcock
- Written by: Hall Caine (novel); Eliot Stannard (scenario)
- Produced by: John Maxwell
- Starring: Carl Brisson; Malcolm Keen; Anny Ondra
- Cinematography: Jack E. Cox
- Edited by: Emile de Ruelle
- Production company: British International Pictures
- Distributed by: Wardour Films
- Release date: January 1929
- Running time: 100 minutes (2012 restoration)
- Country: United Kingdom
- Language: Silent film with English intertitles

The Manxman is a 1929 British silent romance film directed by Alfred Hitchcock and starring Anny Ondra, Carl Brisson and Malcolm Keen. The film is based on a popular 1894 romantic novel The Manxman by Hall Caine, which had previously been made into a film 13 years earlier. It was the last fully silent production that Hitchcock directed before he made the transition to sound film with his next film Blackmail (1929).

== Plot ==
The Manxman (1929)

Two close childhood friends, a handsome but poor fisherman, Pete Quilliam, and a well-educated middle-class lawyer, Philip Christian are smitten with the beautiful and lively Kate, the pub owner's daughter. In Pete's case, Kate is also interested in him, or at least she enjoys having him as a suitor.

Pete proposes, asking Philip to make the case to Kate's dour father, Caesar Cregeen. Cregeen refuses to consent to the marriage, because Pete is penniless. Pete decides to go to Africa to make his fortune, so he will be considered eligible to marry her, and he asks Kate if she will wait for him to return. At first she jokes around, but finally she says yes. Pete then asks Philip to take care of Kate until he returns.

In his absence, Philip starts calling on Kate almost every day. Kate and Philip become strongly attracted to one another, and start an affair while visiting an old mill.

News reaches the village that Pete has been killed in Africa. Philip and Kate are shocked but Kate is relieved to realise that they can now plan their lives together. Philip's career has been going well, and he is preparing to assume the powerful position of Deemster, the island's chief magistrate.

However, it then turns out that a dead man was misidentified as Pete, who is still alive and prospering in Africa. He lets Philip know via telegram that he is returning. Philip urges Kate not to break her promise to marry Pete, allowing him to continue with his career. Pete arrives shortly after the telegram and is extremely happy to be back to his village and see his old sweetheart. Old Caesar is now delighted to agree to Kate marrying Pete. The wedding reception is celebrated in the old mill, where Old Caesar sternly warns the newlyweds to remember that God will punish anyone who violates the vows of marriage.

Kate is still in love with Philip, and can hardly bear to be married to Pete.

As the weeks pass, Pete is thrilled to find out that Kate is pregnant, and he naturally assumes he is the father. When Kate's daughter is born, Kate is desperate and decides to leave Pete. She walks out, leaving her baby behind, and a note saying that she had loved another man, and still loves him. Pete is deeply hurt by this, but puts on a brave face and tells the villagers that Kate has gone to London for a short rest. During the weeks she is gone, Pete proves himself to be a wonderful father, taking care of the baby very well, and comforting himself by believing that although Kate has gone, he still has their baby to love.

Kate persuades Philip to hide her at his law offices, hoping she can still somehow have a life with him. However, Philip is about to become the Deemster, and he is unwilling to ruin his career by running off with her. Frustrated and distraught, Kate returns to the house to take the baby. She tells Pete he is not the baby's father. Pete is stunned and refuses to believe her. He also refuses to give up the child. In desperation, Kate leaves the house and tries to commit suicide by throwing herself off the quay, but is rescued by a policeman. Attempted suicide is classified as a crime, and Kate is brought to trial on the first day that Philip serves as Deemster. Now Philip is stunned and hardly knows what to do. When Pete appears in the courtroom to plead for his wife, Philip agrees to hand Kate over to him. But Kate refuses to go. Kate's father, Old Caesar, who is watching carefully, finally understands that Kate and Philip had an affair. Philip publicly admits his extreme moral failings. He removes his wig and surrenders his official position, and then leaves the court.

Philip and Kate arrive at Pete's house to take away the baby. Kate picks up the child, while Philip and Pete stand at opposite ends of the room. She brings the child over to Pete to say one last goodbye, and he breaks down. Philip and Kate leave the cottage to the jeers and condemnation of the villagers, who have been watching the scene through the windows.

Having lost everything, Pete sets sail again.

== Cast ==
- Carl Brisson as Pete Quilliam
- Malcolm Keen as Philip Christian
- Anny Ondra as Kate Cregeen
- Randle Ayrton as Caesar Cregeen
- Clare Greet as Mother (as Claire Greet)
- Harry Terry as Man (uncredited)
- Kim Peacock as Ross Christian (uncredited)
- Wilfred Shine as Doctor (uncredited)
- Nellie Richards as Wardress (uncredited)

== Production ==
The Manxman began filming on the Isle of Man, but Hitchcock eventually relocated production to Polperro, Cornwall due to frequent creative interference from author Hall Caine, who lived on the Isle of Man. Other scenes were shot at British International Pictures' Elstree Studios, to which Caine was invited to observe. The director began work on the film just two weeks after the birth of his daughter Patricia Hitchcock.

== Preservation and home media ==
A restoration of The Manxman was completed in 2012 as part of the BFI's £2 million "Save the Hitchcock 9" project to restore all of the director's surviving silent films.

Various licensed, restored releases have appeared on DVD, Blu-ray and video on demand services from Optimum in the UK, Lionsgate and Kino Lorber in the US, and many others.

On 1 January 2025, The Manxman entered the public domain in the United States. Due to differing copyright laws, 'The Manxman' will not enter the public domain in the Isle of Man, nor the UK until 2050 (70 years after the death of the director).
