= The Silent House (1929 film) =

1929 film

- Directed by: Walter Forde
- Written by: John G Brandon (play); George Pickett (play); H Fowler Mear (screenplay)
- Produced by: Archibald Nettlefold
- Starring: Mabel Poulton; Gibb McLaughlin; Arthur Pusey; Gerald Rawlinson
- Cinematography: Geoffrey Faithfull; A Randall Terraneau
- Edited by: Walter Forde
- Production company: Nettlefold Films
- Distributed by: Butcher's Film Service
- Release date: January 1929
- Running time: 9,376 feet; 95 minutes
- Country: United Kingdom
- Languages: Silent; English intertitles

The Silent House (also released as The House of Silence) is a 1929 British silent mystery film, directed by Walter Forde and starring Mabel Poulton, Gibb McLaughlin and Arthur Pusey. It was made in 1928 at the Nettlefold Studios in Walton-on-Thames and trade-shown in January 1929. The film was written by H Fowler Mear, based on a hit stage play by John G Brandon and George Pickett, but it was not a success at the box-office. A print of the film exists at the National Film Archive in London.

Chan Fu, the Oriental character played by Gibb McLaughlin, resembles Sax Rohmer's then-popular Fu Manchu character. Jonathan Rigby, in his book Studies in Terror, points out that "The film contains an almost de rigueur tribute to The Cat and the Canary when a corpse pitches forward from its concealment in a fireplace, as well as betraying a submerged uneasiness about Britain's colonial past that was to resurface in several British horrors of a later period."

== Plot ==
The film takes place in an 'old dark house' sporting hidden panels, clutching hands, a snake pit and a secret panel leading to a room used to conceal dead bodies. A Chinese mandarin named Chan Fu (Gibb McLaughlin) uses his Svengali-like powers to hypnotise a woman into revealing the hiding place of a cache of expensive bonds.

== Cast ==
- Mabel Poulton as T'Mala
- Gibb McLaughlin as Chan Fu
- Arthur Pusey as George Winsford
- Gerald Rawlinson as Captain Barty
- Albert Brouett as Peroda
- Rex Maurice as Legarde
- Raston Medrora as Mateo
- Frank Perfitt as Richard Winsford
- Arthur Stratton as Benson
- Kiyoshi Takase as Ho-Fang

== Bibliography ==
- Low, Rachel. The History of British Film: Volume IV, 1918–1929. Routledge, 1997.
- Wood, Linda. British Films, 1927-1939. British Film Institute, 1986.
- Rigby, Jonathan. Studies in Terror: Landmarks of Horror Cinema. Signum Books, 2011.
