= Dino Galvani =

Italian-British actor (1890–1960)

- Dino Galvani in The Vagabond Queen (1929)
- Born: Candido Galvanoni; 27 October 1890; Milan, Kingdom of Italy
- Died: 14 September 1960 (aged 69); London, England
- Occupation: Actor
- Years active: 1922 – 1960 (film)

Dino Galvani (born Candido Galvanoni; 27 October 1890 – 14 September 1960) was an Italian-British actor, who made his career in Britain on stage and radio and in films. He is remembered for his role in the popular BBC radio comedy series ITMA from 1941 to 1945. He was frequently seen on the West End stage, broadcast on radio and, later, television from 1927 to 1959, and made more than thirty films.

== Life and career ==
=== Early years ===
Galvani, né Candido Galvanoni was born in Milan in 1890 and was originally intended for the priesthood. He made his first stage appearance in Milan in 1902 and later pursued his career in Britain, becoming a British national in 1937. He was first seen in London in 1921 as Count Philippe D'Armand in Mr Malatesta at the Court Theatre, and after work in the provinces he established himself in the West End as a character actor. According to The Times, he was "a versatile actor, equally at home in the sinister and the comic", and in the 1920s and 1930s he was frequently seen "playing suave foreign counts and professors with consummate ease".

=== Broadcasting ===
Galvani began broadcasting on BBC radio in 1927, and between 1934 and 1952 he was "Chef d'Orchestre" (announcer-compère) in what The Times calls "the extremely popular Café Colette programme. He joined the popular BBC radio comedy show ITMA in 1941, where he was:

immediately in accord with the unique atmosphere which Tommy Handley had created, able at once to enter into the spirit of Handley's brilliant verbal gagging and to create for himself a niche as the comic foreigner with his tortuous English always dear to the English heart.

He played Signor So-So, Handley's Italian secretary, in five series of ITMA, from 1941 to 1945. After leaving the show he continued to appear in BBC radio broadcasts, his last being in July 1959. On television, Galvani was seen in a range of programmes, from an adaptation of Vanity Fair to children's broadcasts and a documentary.

=== Films ===
Galvani made his first screen appearance in a small role in the silent film The Glorious Adventure. Among his later films are:

- Adam's Apple (1928)
- Adventurous Youth (1928)
- Paradise (1928)
- The Price of Things (1930)
- Black Coffee (1931)
- The Missing Rembrandt (1932)
- Chin Chin Chinaman (1932)
- Once Bitten (1932)
- In a Monastery Garden (1932)
- Heads We Go (1933)
- The Broken Rosary (1934)
- Princess Charming (1934)
- The Queen's Affair (1934)
- Royal Cavalcade (1935)
- Beloved Imposter (1936)
- Mother, Don't Rush Me (1936)
- Ball at Savoy (1936)
- Midnight Menace (1937)
- Big Fella (1937)
- Cafe Colette (1937)
- Special Edition (1938)
- The Viper (1938)
- The Last Barricade (1938)
- Sleeping Car to Trieste (1948)
- Fugitive Lady (1950)
- Shadow of the Eagle (1950)
- The Rival of the Empress (1951)
- Three Steps North (1951)
- Always a Bride (1953)
- Father Brown (1954)
- The Lyons in Paris (1955)
- Fun at St. Fanny's (1956)
- Second Fiddle (1957)
- Bluebeard's Ten Honeymoons (1960)

Galvani died in London on 14 September 1960, aged 69.

=== Sources ===
- Foster, Andy; Furst, Steve (1999). Radio Comedy, 1938–1968: A Guide to 30 Years of Wonderful Wireless. London: Virgin Books. ISBN 978-0-86369-960-3.
