= Little Miss London =

1929 film

- Directed by: Harry Hughes
- Starring: Pamela Parr; Frank Stanmore; Reginald Fox; Pauline Johnson
- Production company: British Instructional Films
- Distributed by: Fox Film Corporation
- Release date: March 1929
- Running time: 6,912 feet
- Country: United Kingdom
- Languages: Silent; English intertitles

Little Miss London is a 1929 British silent comedy film directed by Harry Hughes and starring Pamela Parr, Frank Stanmore and Reginald Fox. It was made by British Instructional Films at Bushey Studios. The screenplay concerns a business magnate who poses as a poor man while his daughter falls in love with a man posing as an aristocrat.

== Cast ==
- Pamela Parr as Moly Carr
- Frank Stanmore as Ephraim Smith
- Reginald Fox as Burton Gregg
- Pauline Johnson as Jill Smith
- Eric Bransby Williams as Jack
- Marie Ault as Mrs Higgins
- Charles Dormer as Lord Blurberry

== Bibliography ==
- Low, Rachel. The History of British Film: Volume IV, 1918–1929. Routledge, 1997.
- Shafer, Stephen C. British Popular 1929-1939: The Cinema of Reassurance. Routledge, 1997.
