= Taxi for Two =

1929 film

- Directed by: Denison Clift; Alexander Esway
- Written by: Ian Dalrymple; Angus MacPhail
- Produced by: Michael Balcon
- Starring: Mabel Poulton; John Stuart
- Cinematography: James Wilson
- Edited by: Ian Dalrymple
- Music by: Leroy Shield
- Production company: Gainsborough Pictures
- Distributed by: Woolf & Freedman Film Service
- Release date: 1 July 1929
- Running time: 73 minutes
- Country: United Kingdom
- Languages: Sound (Part-Talkie); English

Taxi for Two is a 1929 part-talkie sound British romantic comedy film drama directed by Denison Clift and Alexander Esway and starring Mabel Poulton and John Stuart. Produced by Gainsborough Pictures, it was the first sound film made by Gainsborough to be released.

This film also marked Poulton's first speaking role. The film revealed Poulton to have a strident voice with a strong Cockney accent, quite at odds with the fey, winsome persona she had cultivated in her silent film appearances. She would become a notable casualty of the advent of talkies, as offers of screen work quickly dried up once her unappealing tones were revealed.

== Plot ==
Working-class girl Molly finds a necklace and hands it in to the police. It turns out that the necklace is an extremely valuable piece belonging to Lady Devenish, who is impressed by Molly's honesty and invites her to her home to present her with a substantial cash reward. Molly informs Lady Devenish that she has always longed to own her own taxi and plans to use the money to start up in the business. Unknown to Molly, the conversation has been watched and heard by Lady Devenish's son Jack, who finds Molly extremely attractive. Posing as a chauffeur, he applies to be the driver of Molly's first taxi. She agrees to employ him and the pair gradually become romantically involved. Jack finally confesses his real identity, and the couple make plans to marry.

== Cast ==
- Mabel Poulton as Molly
- John Stuart as Jack Devenish
- Gordon Harker as Albert
- Anne Grey as Charlotte
- Grace Lane as Lady Devenish
- Renee Clama as Gladys
- Claude Maxted as The Baron

== See also ==
- List of early sound feature films (1926–1929)
