= Auld Lang Syne (1929 film) =

1929 British film by George Pearson

- Directed by: George Pearson
- Written by: Patrick L. Mannock; Hugh E. Wright; George Pearson
- Produced by: George Pearson
- Starring: Harry Lauder; Dorothy Boyd; Patrick Aherne; Dodo Watts
- Cinematography: Bernard Knowles
- Music by: Robert Burns (songs)
- Production company: Welsh-Pearson
- Distributed by: Paramount British Pictures
- Release date: April 1929
- Running time: 75 minutes
- Country: United Kingdom
- Languages: Sound (Synchronized); English

Auld Lang Syne is a 1929 British synchronized sound musical film directed by George Pearson and starring Harry Lauder, Dorothy Boyd, and Patrick Aherne. It was originally made as a silent film, but in September 1929 sound was added. While the sound version has no audible dialog, it features a synchronized musical score, singing and sound effects. It was shot at Cricklewood Studios in Cricklewood, London.

== Cast ==
- Harry Lauder as Sandy McTavish
- Dorothy Boyd as Jill Bray
- Patrick Aherne as Angus McTavish
- Dodo Watts as Marie McTavish
- Hugh E. Wright as Wullie McNab

== See also ==
- List of early sound feature films (1926–1929)
