= The Alley Cat (1929 film) =

1929 film by Hans Steinhoff

- Directed by: Hans Steinhoff
- Written by: Anthony Carlyle (novel); Iris North
- Produced by: Georg Jacoby; Sidney Morgan
- Starring: Mabel Poulton; Jack Trevor; Clifford McLaglen; Shayle Gardner
- Cinematography: Nicolas Farkas
- Production companies: British & Foreign; Orplid-Film
- Distributed by: Messtro-Orplid
- Release date: 3 February 1929
- Running time: 79 minutes
- Countries: Germany; United Kingdom
- Languages: Silent; English/German intertitles

The Alley Cat is a 1929 British-German silent drama film directed by Hans Steinhoff and starring Mabel Poulton, Jack Trevor and Clifford McLaglen. The film was made as a co-production between the British company British & Foreign and the German Orplid-Film. Its German title was Nachtgestalten. The film was shot in Britain, partly on location around the Docklands in London. Studio shooting took place at the Grunewald Studios in Berlin. It was based on a novel by Anthony Carlyle.

== Cast ==
- Mabel Poulton as Polly
- Jack Trevor as Jimmy Rice
- Clifford McLaglen as Simon Beck
- Shayle Gardner as inspector Fordham
- Margit Manstad as Melona Miller
- Marie Ault as Ma

== Bibliography ==
- Low, Rachael (1971). The History of the British Film, 1918–1929. London: Allen & Unwin. ISBN 978-0-04-791021-0.
