= Daughter of the Regiment (1929 film) =

1929 film by Hans Behrendt

- Directed by: Hans Behrendt
- Written by: Hans H. Zerlett
- Produced by: Victor Skutezky
- Cinematography: René Guissart
- Music by: Hansheinrich Dransmann
- Production companies: British International Pictures; Hom-Film
- Distributed by: Wardour Films; Süd-Film
- Release date: 28 February 1929
- Country: Germany
- Languages: Silent; German intertitles

Daughter of the Regiment (German: Die Regimentstochter) is a 1929 British-German silent film directed by Hans Behrendt and starring Betty Balfour, Alexander D'Arcy, and Kurt Gerron. The plot is loosely based on the 1840 opera composed by Gaetano Donizetti. Subsequent adaptations of the story were made in 1933 and 1953.

The film's sets were designed by Heinrich Richter.

== Cast ==
- Betty Balfour as Marie, Regiments Daughter
- Alexander D'Arcy
- Kurt Gerron as Quippo, Guard
- Julius Falkenstein
- Olga Limburg as Countess Brascani

== Bibliography ==
- Caughie, John; Rockett, Kevin (1996). The Companion to British and Irish Cinema. London: Cassell. ISBN 978-0-304-34158-0.
