= Craven Park Studios =

British film studio

The Craven Park Studios were a British film studio that operated between 1918 and 1926. They were located in Harlesden in London. The studios established in 1918 by the Welsh-Pearson company, who enjoyed significant success during the 1920s. The limited space available led to the use of other, better-equipped studios such as Islington Studios for some of the company's larger scenes. In 1926 the studio was shut.

== Bibliography ==
- Warren, Patricia. British Film Studios: An Illustrated History. Batsford, 2001.
