= Frank Stanmore (actor) =

English actor (1877–1943)

- Stanmore in a 1905 production of Oliver Twist
- Born: 10 March 1877; London, England
- Died: 15 August 1943 (aged 66); Gravesend, Kent, England
- Occupation: Actor
- Years active: 1914–1938

Frank Stanmore (10 March 1877 – 15 August 1943) was an English film actor. He appeared in 76 films between 1914 and 1938. He was born in London and died in Gravesend, Kent.

== Selected filmography ==
- The Third String (1914)
- Love in a Wood (1915)
- The Mother of Dartmoor (1916)
- Mother Love (1916)
- The Grit of a Jew (1917)
- Judge Not (1920)
- The Wonderful Year (1921)
- Love's Boomerang (1922)
- The Spanish Jade (1922)
- A Rogue in Love (1922)
- Love, Life and Laughter (1923)
- The School for Scandal (1923)
- The Naked Man (1923)
- Squibs M.P. (1923)
- Squibs' Honeymoon (1923)
- Lily of the Alley (1924)
- Her Redemption (1924)
- The Alley of Golden Hearts (1924)
- Reveille (1924)
- The Blackguard (1925)
- Satan's Sister (1925)
- Cats (1925)
- The Little People (1926)
- Blinkeyes (1926)
- The Only Way (1927)
- The Hellcat (1928)
- What Next? (1928)
- Houp La! (1928)
- Chamber of Horrors (1929)
- Wait and See (1929)
- Three Men in a Cart (1929)
- Little Miss London (1929)
- Red Pearls (1930)
- Leave It to Me (1930)
- You'd Be Surprised! (1930)
- The Great Gay Road (1931)
- Let's Love and Laugh (1931)
- The Old Man (1931)
- Lucky Girl (1932)
- Don Quixote (1933)
- Dora (1933)
- That's a Good Girl (1933)
- It's a Bet (1935)
- I Live Again (1936)
