= Squibs (1921 film) =

1921 film

- Directed by: George Pearson
- Starring: Betty Balfour Hugh E. Wright Fred Groves
- Release date: 1921
- Country: United Kingdom
- Language: Silent (English intertitles)

Squibs is a 1921 British silent comedy film directed by George Pearson and starring Betty Balfour, Hugh E. Wright and Fred Groves. It was followed by three sequels starting with Squibs Wins the Calcutta Sweep and a 1935 remake.

== Cast ==
- Betty Balfour – Squibs Hopkins
- Hugh E. Wright – Sam Hopkins
- Fred Groves – PC Charlie Lee
- Mary Brough – Mrs. Lee
- W. Cronin Wilson – Bully Dawson
- Annette Benson – Ivy Hopkins
- Ambrose Manning – Inspector Robert Lee
- Tom Morris – Gus Holly
- William Matthews – Peters
