= The Vagabond Queen =

1929 film directed by Géza von Bolváry

- Betty Balfour and Glen Byam Shaw in The Vagabond Queen
- Directed by: Géza von Bolváry
- Written by: Douglas Furber; Rex Taylor; Val Valentine
- Starring: Betty Balfour; Glen Byam Shaw; Ernest Thesiger
- Cinematography: Charles Rosher
- Edited by: Emile de Ruelle
- Production company: British International Pictures
- Distributed by: Wardour Films
- Release dates: May 1929 (UK, silent); 28 August 1929 (Hungary); 19 August 1930 (UK, sound)
- Running time: 62 minutes
- Country: United Kingdom
- Languages: Sound (Synchronized); English Intertitles

The Vagabond Queen is a 1929 sound British comedy film directed by Géza von Bolváry and starring Betty Balfour, Glen Byam Shaw, and Ernest Thesiger. While the film has no audible dialog, it features a synchronized musical score, singing and sound effects on the soundtrack. This film was the final film directed in Britain by Bolváry before he returned to Germany. It was made by British International Pictures.

== Plot ==
A young woman takes the place of a Princess who is a target for an assassination.

== Cast ==
- Betty Balfour as Sally / Princess Zonia
- Glen Byam Shaw as Jimmie
- Ernest Thesiger as Lidoff
- Harry Terry as Winkleburg
- Charles Dormer as Prince Adolphe
- Dino Galvani as Ilmar

== Bibliography ==
- Bergfelder, Tim; Cargnelli, Christian, eds. (2008). Destination London: German-Speaking Emigrés and British Cinema, 1925–1950. New York: Berghahn Books. ISBN 978-0-85745-019-7.
