= Percy Strong =

British cinematographer (1896–1939)

- Born: 1896; London; United Kingdom
- Died: 1939 (aged 42-43); Kent; United Kingdom
- Other name: Percival Strong
- Occupation: Cinematographer
- Children: Tony Strong

Percy Strong (1896–1939) was a British cinematographer. During his career, Strong worked on a mixture of prestige films and supporting features. He was sometimes credited as Percival Strong.

== Selected filmography ==
- The Flame (1920)
- The River of Stars (1921)
- Gwyneth of the Welsh Hills (1921)
- The Romany (1923)
- Love, Life and Laughter (1923)
- Not for Sale (1924)
- Reveille (1924)
- The Maid at the Palace (1927)
- The Flight Commander (1927)
- Quinneys (1927)
- The Glad Eye (1927)
- Balaclava (1928)
- Palais de danse (1928)
- High Treason (1929)
- The Devil's Maze (1929)
- The Night Porter (1930)
- Greek Street (1930)
- No Lady (1931)
- Down River (1931)
- The Happy Ending (1931)
- Bracelets (1931)
- East Lynne on the Western Front (1931)
- After the Ball (1932)
- Soldiers of the King (1933)
- The Girl in the Flat (1934)
- The Last Journey (1936)

== Bibliography ==
- Low, Rachael. History of the British Film: Filmmaking in 1930s Britain. George Allen & Unwin, 1985 .
