= Betty Balfour =

British actress (1902–1977)

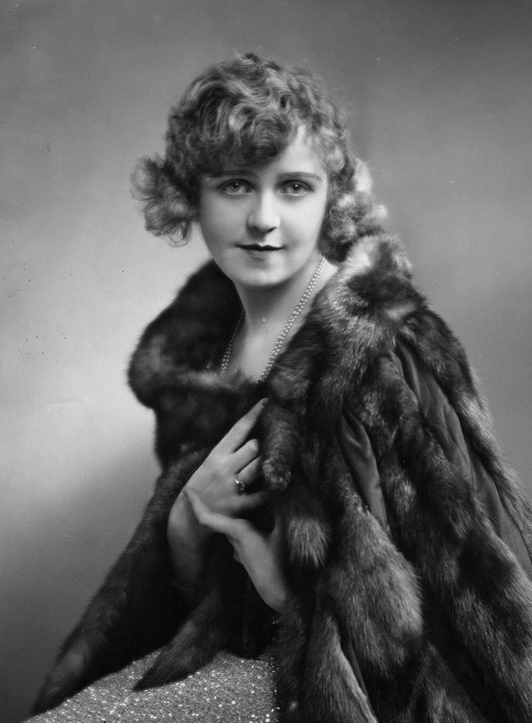
- Born: Florence Lilian Woods; 27 March 1902; London, England
- Died: 4 November 1977 (aged 75); Weybridge, Surrey, England
- Occupation: Actress
- Years active: 1920–1945
- Spouse: Jimmy Campbell (m. 1931; div. 1941)

Betty Balfour (born Florence Lilian Woods; 27 March 1902 – 4 November 1977) was an English screen actress, popular during the silent era, and known as the "British Mary Pickford" and "Britain's Queen of Happiness". She was best known to audiences for her Squibs series of films.

== Life and career ==
Balfour was the most popular actress in Britain in the 1920s, and in 1927 she was named by the Daily Mirror as the country's favourite world star. Her talent was most evident in the Squibs comedy series produced by George Pearson, while in his Love, Life and Laughter (1923), rediscovered in 2014, and Reveille (1924), she demonstrated a serious side to her character. Her role as a wealthy heiress in Somebody's Darling (1925) was an attempt to break out of her previous role as Squibs, to avoid typecasting.

She made her stage debut in 1913, and was appearing in Medora at the Alhambra Theatre in Leicester Square when T. A. Welsh and Pearson saw and signed her for Nothing Else Matters in 1920. After replacing Gertrude Lawrence on stage in The Midnight Follies, Balfour was back with Pearson with her first starring role in Mary Find the Gold.

In 1916 she starred in Fred Karno's all female revue, 'All Women,' notable at the time for its all female cast, including stage manager, musical director and advanced agent.

Balfour made no attempt to break into Hollywood but like Ivor Novello she was able to export her talents to mainland Europe. She starred in the German films, Die sieben Töchter der Frau Gyurkovics and Die Regimentstochter; she also worked for Marcel L'Herbier in Le Diable au cœur, for Louis Mercanton in Croquette and La Petite Bonne du palace, and for Géza von Bolváry in Bright Eyes.

Back in Britain, she also starred in Alfred Hitchcock's Champagne (1928). Balfour's sound debut, Walter Summers' musical Raise the Roof, released in February 1930, was a sizable hit, but her second talkie, Mercanton's The Nipper, based on the Squibs character and released the following August, was only moderately successful. She then didn't appear in a film for four years, after which she played a supporting role to Jessie Matthews in Victor Saville's Evergreen (1934). She then made a musical remake of Squibs, directed by Henry Edwards, appeared with John Mills in Walter Forde and Anthony Asquith's Forever England (1935), and played the matriarch in Henry Cass' 29 Acacia Avenue (1945).

Balfour had less fortune in her private life. Her marriage to composer Jimmy Campbell went on the rocks in 1941 after ten years and an attempt of a comeback on the stage failed in 1952. She died at age 75 in Weybridge, Surrey.

== Filmography ==
- Nothing Else Matters (1920) – Sally
- Mary-Find-the-Gold (1921) – Mary Smith
- Squibs (1921) – Squibs Hopkins
- Squibs Wins the Calcutta Sweep (1922) – Squibs Hopkins
- Wee MacGregor's Sweetheart (1922) – Christine
- Mord Em'ly (1922) – Maud Emily
- Love, Life and Laughter (1923) – Tip-Toes
- Squibs' Honeymoon (1923) – Squibs Hopkins
- Squibs M.P. (1923) – Squibs Hopkins
- Reveille (1924) – Mick
- Satan's Sister (1925) – Jude Tyler
- Somebody's Darling (1925) – Joan Meredith
- Monte Carlo (1925) – Betty Oliver
- Blinkeyes (1926) – Blinkeyes
- Cinders (La petite bonne du palace) (1926)
- Pearl of Love (1925)
- La Petite Bonne du palace (The Maid at the Palace) (1926) – Betty Cinders
- The Sea Urchin (1926) – Fay Wynchbeck
- Topical Budget newsreel: "Cinema Stars' Rally" (1926) – self
- Croquette (Monkey Nuts) (1928) – Croquette
- Le Diable au cœur (Little Devil May Care) (1928) – Ludivine Ducaille – une fille étrange
- Die sieben Töchter der Frau Gyurkovics (A Sister of Six) (1926) – Mizzi
- Champagne (1928) – The Girl
- A Little Bit of Fluff (1928) – Mamie Scott
- Die Regimentstochter (Daughter of the Regiment) (1929) – Marie – Regiments Daughter
- Paradise (1928) – Kitty Cranston
- Bright Eyes (Champagner) (1929) – Jenny
- The Vagabond Queen (1929) – Sally / Princess Zonia
- Raise the Roof (1930) – Maisie Grey
- The Nipper (also known as The Brat) (1930) – The Nipper
- My Old Dutch (1934) – Lil
- Evergreen (1934) – Maudie
- Brown on Resolution (1935) – Elizabeth Brown
- Squibs (1935) – Amelia "Squibs" Hopkins
- Eliza Comes to Stay (1936) – Eliza Vandan
- 29 Acacia Avenue (1945) – Mrs. Robinson
