= Louis Mercanton =

Swiss film director, screenwriter and actor (1879-1932)

- Sketch of Mercanton for Phroso, 1921
- Born: 4 May 1879; Nyon, Vaud, Switzerland
- Died: 29 April 1932 (aged 52); Neuilly-sur-Seine, France
- Occupations: Film director, screenwriter, producer, actor

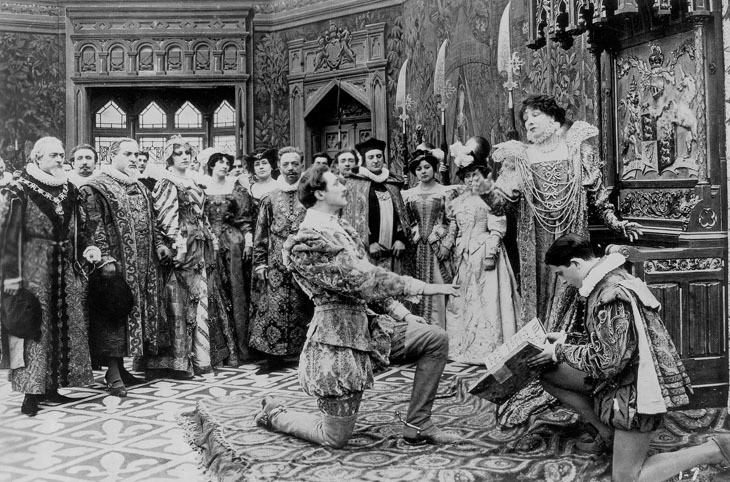
Sarah Bernhardt as Queen Elizabeth with Lou Tellegen in Les Amours de la reine Élisabeth (1912)

Louis Mercanton (4 May 1879 – 29 April 1932) was a Swiss film director, screenwriter, producer and actor who later became a French citizen. He worked in France and Britain and became closely associated with Sarah Bernhardt, directing several of her films, including Queen Elizabeth (1912).

== Life and career ==
Louis Mercanton was born on 4 May 1879 in Nyon, Switzerland, the son of hotelier Louis Mercanton and Marie Emilie Lorezon. Raised in England, he pursued studies in Switzerland as well as in England. Mercanton first worked on stage in South Africa and in 1904 took up the management of His Majesty's Theatre in London. He married Alice Rhoda Wright in 1905.

Mercanton moved into film production with Eclipse in 1911, taking responsibility for its artistic direction. Working in Paris and London, he was also active as a producer and screenwriter. His directing career began in 1912, and his subsequent film work brought both commercial success and recognition for technical innovation.

Mercanton became closely associated with Sarah Bernhardt, directing her in Adrienne Lecouvreur and Queen Elizabeth in 1912. Queen Elizabeth was particularly successful in the United States. He married Fernande Elisabeth Ducrabon in 1913. A number of his early films were made jointly with Henri Desfontaines, while his collaborations with René Hervil began in 1916.

Mercanton's later collaborations with Bernhardt included Jeanne Doré (1916) and Mères françaises (1917). During 1916 and 1917, he also produced several films featuring Suzanne Grandais. He later directed two films from Marcel L'Herbier's first screenplays, Le Torrent (1917) and Bouclette (1918). In the post-war period, Mercanton founded a production company under his own name, Les Films Louis Mercanton.

After seeing a photograph of Ivor Novello, Mercanton chose him for The Call of the Blood. The role marked Novello's screen debut. Although the picture met with limited success, Novello came to public attention and Mercanton later cast him in another film. Mercanton married Geneviève Marie Terrier in 1919. He later acquired French citizenship. Mercanton died of a heart attack on 29 April 1932 in Neuilly-sur-Seine, near Paris.

== Selected filmography ==
- Les Amours de la reine Élisabeth (1912)
- Infatuation aka Bouclette (1918)
- Miarka (1920)
- The Call of the Blood (1920)
- Possession (1922)
- The Gardens of Murcia (1923)
- Monte Carlo (1925)
- The Maid at the Palace (1927)
- Croquette (1927)
- Venus (1929)
- The Mystery of the Villa Rose (1930)
- The Nipper (1930)
- Chérie (1930)
- Let's Get Married (1931)
- A Man of Mayfair (1931)
- These Charming People (1931)
- Cognasse (1932)
- Passionately (1932)
- Students in Paris (1932)
- The Fish Woman (1932)
- He Is Charming (1932)
