= Welsh-Pearson =

British film production and distribution company

Welsh-Pearson Company
- Industry: Film production; Film distribution
- Founded: 1918; 108 years ago
- Founders: George Pearson; Thomas Welsh

The Welsh-Pearson Company was a British film production and distribution company active during the silent and early sound eras. It was founded in 1918 by two pioneering film figures, George Pearson and Thomas Welsh, with the single-stage Craven Park Studios as their base. Because of the cramped conditions there, Welsh-Pearson had to use other studios such as Islington for larger scenes.

Pearson recruited Betty Balfour for the company's films, and she was transformed into the leading British female star of the 1920s. Amongst her most popular roles were the series of films that began with Squibs in 1921. In 1929 the company moved into sound production, with a tie-up with Gainsborough Pictures to make Journey's End, which was filmed in America. It launched the directing career of James Whale. who quickly became a leading figure in Hollywood.

Shortly afterwards the company abandoned film production and Pearson, who had once been a leading force in British direction, drifted into making quota quickies.

== Selected filmography ==
- The Romance of Old Bill (1918)
- Journey's End (1930)

== Bibliography ==
- Low, Rachael. The History of the British Film, 1918-1929. George Allen & Unwin, 1971.
- Warren, Patricia. British Film Studios: An Illustrated History. Batsford, 2001.
