= George Pearson (filmmaker) =

English film director, producer and screenwriter (1875–1973)

- Born: 19 March 1875; London, England
- Died: 6 February 1973 (aged 97); Malvern, Worcestershire, England
- Occupations: Director, producer, screenwriter
- Years active: 1914–1937

George Pearson OBE, (19 March 1875 – 6 February 1973) was a pioneering English film director, producer and screenwriter, mainly in the silent film era. He was born in London.

== Biography ==
The only son of George Pearson, a silk tie cutter, George Pearson's first profession after Culham College, near Oxford (not a college of the University of Oxford) was teaching. He excelled in this role, becoming a headmaster by 1902 at the age of 26. His major post was at Staples Rd School Loughton Essex, on which there is a blue plaque. He was originally drawn to film making as an educational aid. In 1913 Pearson entered the film industry, initially as a script writer.

Pearson worked for Gaumont and later joined the Colonial Film Unit (later the Commonwealth Film Unit), remaining in employment until the age of 81. Though little of his work is known to have survived, Pearson is credited with pioneering the use of the moving camera shot.

== Awards and personal life ==
In 1951, he was awarded the OBE. Pearson married Edith Stacey (1881-1961) in 1901. They had two sons and two daughters. One daughter, Winifred, worked as a film editor. He died in Great Malvern, Worcestershire in 1973, aged nearly 98, outliving Winifred and his elder son, Malcolm, a surgeon. In 1957, his autobiography, Flashback, was published.

== Selected filmography ==
- Peg Woffington (1912)
- The Fool (1913)
- Heroes of the Mine (1913)
- A Study in Scarlet (1914)
- John Halifax, Gentleman (1915)
- A Cinema Girl's Romance (1915)
- Ultus and the Grey Lady (1916)
- Sally Bishop (1916)
- The Kiddies in the Ruins (1918)
- The Romance of Old Bill (1918)
- Nothing Else Matters (1920)
- Mary Find the Gold (1921)
- Squibs Wins the Calcutta Sweep (1922)
- Mord Em'ly (1922)
- Squibs' Honeymoon (1923)
- Squibs M.P. (1923)
- Love, Life and Laughter (1923)
- The Romany (1923)
- Reveille (1924)
- The Little People (1926)
- Blinkeyes (1926)
- Huntingtower (1927)
- Love's Option (1928)
- Auld Lang Syne (1929)
- Journey's End (1930)
- East Lynne on the Western Front (1931)
- The Good Companions (1933) (associate producer)
- A Shot in the Dark (1933)
- Whispering Tongues (1934)
- The Ace of Spades (1935)
- That's My Uncle (1935)
- Jubilee Window (1935)
- Checkmate (1935)
- Midnight at Madame Tussaud's (1936)
- Follow Your Star (1938)

== Bibliography ==
- Flashback: an Autobiography of A British Film Maker, George Allen & Unwin (1957)
