= List of British films of 1924 =

A list of British films released in 1924.

== 1924 ==
Title	Director	Cast	Genre	Notes
1924
The Alley of Golden Hearts	Bertram Phillips	Queenie Thomas, John Stuart	Drama	
Chappy - That's All	Thomas Bentley	Lewis Gilbert, Gertrude McCoy	Drama	
Claude Duval	George A. Cooper	Nigel Barrie, Fay Compton	Adventure	
The Colleen Bawn	W. P. Kellino	Henry Victor, Colette Brettel, Stewart Rome	Drama	
The Conspirators	Sinclair Hill	Betty Faire, David Hawthorne	Crime	
The Cost of Beauty	Walter Summers	Betty Ross Clarke, Lewis Dayton	Romance	
Decameron Nights	Herbert Wilcox	Lionel Barrymore, Ivy Duke, Werner Krauss	Drama	
The Diamond Man	Arthur Rooke	Arthur Wontner, Mary Odette	Crime	
The Eleventh Commandment	George A. Cooper	Fay Compton, Stewart Rome	Crime	
Eugene Aram	Arthur Rooke	Arthur Wontner, Mary Odette	Drama	
The Flying Fifty-Five	A. E. Coleby	Lionelle Howard, Frank Perfitt	Sports	
A Gamble in Lives	George Ridgwell	Malvina Longfellow, Norman McKinnel	Drama	
The Gay Corinthian	Arthur Rooke	Victor McLaglen, Betty Faire	Sport	
The Great Prince Shan	Guy Newall	Sessue Hayakawa, Ivy Duke	Drama	
The Great Turf Mystery	Walter West	Violet Hopson, James Knight	Sport	
The Great Well	Henry Kolker	Thurston Hall, Seena Owen	Drama	
The Happy Prisoner	Hugh Croise	Ben Field, James Knight	Comedy	
Henry, King of Navarre	Maurice Elvey	Matheson Lang, Gladys Jennings	Historical	
Her Redemption	Bertram Phillips	Queenie Thomas, John Stuart	Crime	
His Grace Gives Notice	W. P. Kellino	Nora Swinburne, Henry Victor	Comedy	
Human Desires	Burton George	Marjorie Daw, Clive Brook	Romance	
Hurricane Hutch in Many Adventures	Charles Hutchison	Charles Hutchison, Warwick Ward	Action	
Lily of the Alley	Henry Edwards	Henry Edwards, Chrissie White	Drama	
Love and Hate	Thomas Bentley	George Foley, Frank Perfitt	Comedy	
The Love Story of Aliette Brunton	Maurice Elvey	Isobel Elsom, Henry Victor	Romance	
Lovers in Araby	Adrian Brunel	Annette Benson, Miles Mander	Adventure	
The Mating of Marcus	W. P. Kellino	David Hawthorne, George Bellamy	Romance	
Miriam Rozella	Sidney Morgan	Moyna Macgill, Owen Nares	Drama	
The Money Habit	Walter Niebuhr	Clive Brook, Annette Benson	Crime	
Moonbeam Magic	Felix Orman	Roy Travers, Mabel Poulton	Fantasy	
Nets of Destiny	Arthur Rooke	Stewart Rome, Mary Odette, Gertrude McCoy	Drama	
Not for Sale	W. P. Kellino	Mary Odette, Ian Hunter	Comedy	
The Notorious Mrs. Carrick	George Ridgwell	Cameron Carr, Gordon Hopkirk	Crime	
Old Bill Through the Ages	Thomas Bentley	Syd Walker, Arthur Cleave	Comedy/fantasy	
Ordeal by Golf	Andrew P. Wilson	Harry Beasley, Moore Marriott	Comedy	
Owd Bob	Henry Edwards	Ralph Forbes, James Carew	Drama	
The Passionate Adventure	Graham Cutts	Clive Brook, Alice Joyce	Drama	First Gainsborough Pictures production
The Prehistoric Man	A. E. Coleby	George Robey, Johnny Butt	Comedy	
The Prude's Fall	Graham Cutts	Jane Novak, Julanne Johnston	Drama	
Réveille	George Pearson	Betty Balfour, Stewart Rome	War	
Sally Bishop	Maurice Elvey	Marie Doro, Henry Ainley	Romance	
The Scarlet Woman	Terence Greenidge	Elsa Lanchester, Evelyn Waugh	Comedy	Written by Evelyn Waugh.
Sen Yan's Devotion	A.E. Coleby	Sessue Hayakawa, Tsuru Aoki	Drama	
Shadow of Egypt	Sidney Morgan	Carlyle Blackwell, Alma Taylor	Adventure	
The Sins Ye Do	Fred LeRoy Granville	Joan Lockton, Henry Victor	Romance	
Slaves of Destiny	Maurice Elvey	Matheson Lang, Valia	Drama	
Southern Love	Herbert Wilcox	Betty Blythe, Herbert Langley	Drama	
The Stirrup Cup Sensation	Walter West	Violet Hopson, Stewart Rome	Sport	
Straws in the Wind	Bertram Phillips	Betty Ross Clarke, Queenie Thomas	Drama	
Tons of Money	Frank Hall Crane	Leslie Henson, Flora le Breton	Comedy	
The Unwanted	Walter Summers	C. Aubrey Smith, Lillian Hall-Davis	Drama	
Wanted, a Boy	Thomas Bentley	Sydney Fairbrother, Lionelle Howard	Comedy	
What the Butler Saw	George Dewhurst	Irene Rich, Guy Newall	Comedy	
White Slippers	Sinclair Hill	Matheson Lang, Joan Lockton	Adventure	
Who Is the Man?	Walter Summers	John Gielgud, Isobel Elsom	Drama	
The Wine of Life	Arthur Rooke	Betty Carter, Clive Brook	Drama	
Women and Diamonds	F. Martin Thornton	Victor McLaglen, Madge Stuart	Crime	
The World of Wonderful Reality	Henry Edwards	Henry Edwards, Chrissie White	Romance	
Young Lochinvar	W. P. Kellino	Owen Nares, Gladys Jennings	Drama	

== See also ==
- 1924 in film
- 1924 in the United Kingdom
