= Peleg =

Biblical character

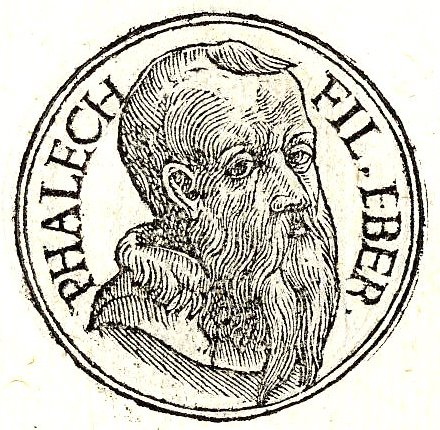
- Peleg imagined in the 1553 Promptuarium Iconum Insigniorum
- Born: 2355 BCE (the time when the earth was divided); Ur, Sumer (present-day southern Iraq)
- Died: 2116 BCE (aged 239)
- Children: Reu and others
- Parent: Eber

Peleg (Hebrew: פֶּלֶג, romanized: Péleḡ, in pausa Hebrew: פָּלֶג, romanized: Pā́leḡ, "division"; Biblical Greek: Φάλεκ, romanized: Phálek) is mentioned in the Hebrew Bible as one of the two sons of Eber, an ancestor of the Ishmaelites and the Israelites, according to the Generations of Noah in Genesis 10–11 and 1 Chronicles 1.

== In Scriptures ==
Peleg (son of Eber son of Salah son of Arpaxad son of Shem son of Noah) had a son, Reu, born when Peleg was thirty, and he had other sons and daughters. According to the Hebrew Bible, Peleg lived to the age of 239 years, (Genesis 11:16–19) (up to when his relative Terah, the father of Abraham, was 118).

The Septuagint (and some Christian Bibles derived from it) call Peleg Phaleg and his father Heber. His son is called Ragau, born when Phaleg was 130 years old, and he had other sons and daughters. According to the Septuagint, Phaleg lived to an age of 339 years. (Septuagint Genesis 11:16-19) Modern translations generally use the names and dating as in the Masoretic Hebrew text. (compare Genesis 11:16–19)

== "The earth was divided" ==
According to Genesis 10:25 and 1 Chronicles 1:19, it was during the time of Peleg that the earth was divided – traditionally, this is often assumed to be just before, during, or after the failure of the Tower of Babel, whose construction was traditionally attributed to Nimrod. The meaning of the Earth being divided is usually taken to refer to a patriarchal division of the world, or possibly just the Eastern Hemisphere, into allotted portions among the three sons of Noah for future occupation, as specifically described in the Book of Jubilees, Biblical Antiquities of Philo, Kitab al-Magall, Flavius Josephus, and numerous other antiquarian and mediaeval sources, even as late as Archbishop Ussher, in his Annals of the World. One account, the Conflict of Adam and Eve with Satan, states that "In the days of Phalek (Peleg), the earth was divided a second time among the three sons of Noah; Shem, Ham and Japheth" – it had been divided once previously among the three sons by Noah himself.

Some creationists interpret this verse to refer to the continent of Pangaea being split into the modern continents, directly contradicting established scientific data that puts the breakup of Pangaea at approximately 250 million years before the present.

== Popularity of the name ==
Peleg is a common first name and surname in Israel, also being the root lettering for sailing (lehaflig להפליג) and a military half-bivouac tent (peleg-ohel פלג אוהל). The meaning of Peleg in English is "brook", a little river.

== In popular culture ==
Peleg is the name of one of the principal owners of the fictional whaling ship Pequod in Herman Melville's Moby-Dick (1851). The following actors have portrayed this character in film adaptations:

- Mervyn Johns in Moby Dick (1956)
- Gordon Stanley in the off-Broadway Moby Dick (1986)

Peleg Peterson (played by Fred Paul) is a character in the silent film Infelice (1915). This film is an adaptation of the 1875 novel of the same name by Augusta J. Evans.

Dan Peleg (played by Noah Emmerich) is a Mossad trainer in the miniseries The Spy (2019).
