= Won by Losing =

- Directed by: Bertram Phillips
- Written by: Bertram Phillips
- Starring: Queenie Thomas; Frank McClellan
- Production company: Holmfirth Films
- Distributed by: Initial Films
- Release date: March 1916
- Country: United Kingdom
- Languages: Silent; English intertitles

Won by Losing is a 1916 British silent drama film directed by Bertram Phillips and starring Queenie Thomas and Frank McClellan.

== Cast ==
- Frank McClellan
- Queenie Thomas as Polly / Daphne

== Bibliography ==
- Low, Rachael. History of the British Film, 1914-1918. Routledge, 2005.
