= A Night at the Movies =

A Night at the Movies may refer to:

- A Night at the Movies (film), a short film by humorist Robert Benchley
- "A Night at the Movies" (CSI), an episode of CSI: Crime Scene Investigation
- A Night at the Movies, a 1987 anthology by Robert Coover
- A Night at the Movies, a 1997 album by David Essex
