= Cecil Birch =

British film director

- Occupation: Film director
- Years active: 1914 - 1916 (film)

Cecil Birch was a British film director of the silent era. He directed more than a hundred short and feature films. He directed the 1915 hit melodrama Paula for Holmfirth Films.

== Selected filmography ==
- Paula (1915)

== Bibliography ==
- Low, Rachael. History of the British Film, 1914-1918. Routledge, 2005.
