= A Man the Army Made =

- Directed by: Bertram Phillips
- Written by: Cecil Shaw; F. Martin Thornton
- Starring: Queenie Thomas; Mickey Brantford
- Production company: Holmfirth Films
- Distributed by: Pathé Pictures International
- Release date: 1917
- Running time: 4,1000 feet
- Country: United Kingdom
- Languages: Silent; English intertitles

A Man the Army Made is a 1917 British silent war drama film directed by Bertram Phillips and starring Queenie Thomas, Paul R. Hall and H. Agar Lyons.

== Cast ==
- Queenie Thomas as Queenie Clarke
- Corporal Paul R. Hall as Dick Clarke
- H. Agar Lyons as Irwin Lockwood
- Mickey Brantford as Derry Clarke

== Bibliography ==
- Low, Rachael. History of the British Film, 1914-1918. Routledge, 2005.
