= Chance of a Lifetime =

Chance of a Lifetime or The Chance of a Lifetime may refer to:

== Film and television ==
- The Chance of a Lifetime (1916 film), a British silent sports drama
- The Chance of a Lifetime (1943 film), a crime drama
- Chance of a Lifetime (1950 film), a British film
- Chance of a Lifetime (1991 film), an American film starring Betty White
- Chance of a Lifetime, a 1998 television film starring John Ritter and Katey Sagal
- Chance of a Lifetime (TV series), a 1952–1956 talent show which aired on ABC and DuMont
- "Chance of a Lifetime" (Knots Landing), a 1980 television episode

== Other uses ==
- "Chance of a Lifetime" (Pat McGeegan song), the Irish entry in the Eurovision Song Contest 1968, performed in English by Pat McGeegan
- "Chance of a Lifetime", a song from the 1983 album Keep It Up by Loverboy
- "Chance of a Lifetime", a song from the 2003 album Mest by Mest
- The Chance of a Lifetime (novel), a 1907 novel by Nathaniel Gould

== See also ==
- The $1,000,000 Chance of a Lifetime, a 1986–87 U.S. game show
- The $1,000,000 Chance of a Lifetime (Australian game show), a 1999 Australian game show
- It's Your Chance of a Lifetime, the 2000 U.S. version of the above Australian series
- Chance for a Lifetime, 2005 album by Catchpenny
- Chance for a Live Time, 2001 live album by Kayak
