= Nina Vanna =

Russian-born British actress (1899–1953)

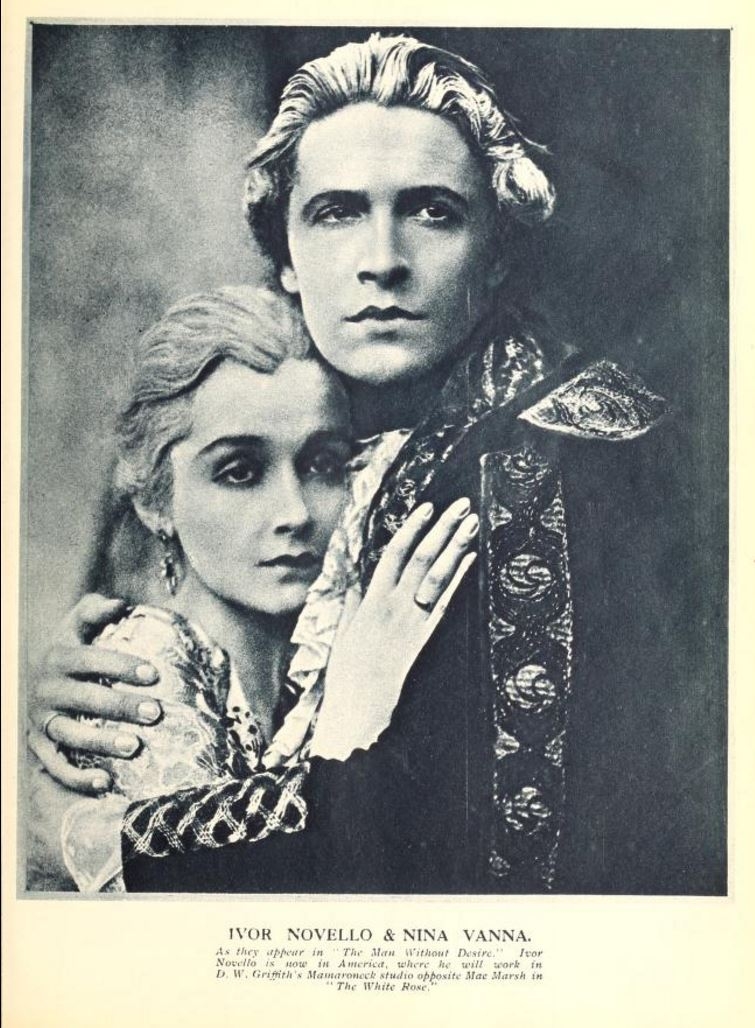
- Nina Vanna and Ivor Novello in "The Man Without Desire"
- Born: Nina Yazykova; 27 September 1899; Minsk, Belarus
- Died: 8 November 1953 (aged 54); Battle, East Sussex, England, UK
- Occupation: Actress
- Years active: 1923–1937

Nina Kind Hakim Provatoroff, known by her stage name of Nina Vanna (née Yazykova; 27 September 1899 – 8 November 1953), was a Russian-born British film actress who appeared in a number of silent films during the 1920s.

She sometimes played in historical dramas, playing Lady Jane Grey in the first of three film versions of her life (Lady Jane Grey; Or, the Court of Intrigue) and Lucrezia Borgia in what may be the first of several versions.

Vanna was married three times, first to Robert Kind from whom she was later divorced, secondly to film director Eric Hakim (1900–1967), whom she also divorced, and finally to an importer/exporter and art collector Peter Provatoroff from 1946 until her death in Banstead, Surrey, UK.

== Career ==
Vanna began her film career in England where she made her debut in Scrooge (1923) as Alice. In the next years followed her leading roles in films, among them A Christmas Carol (1923), Lucrezia Borgia; Or, Plaything of Power (1923), Lady Jane Grey in Lady Jane Grey; Or, The Court of Intrigue (1923), The Man Without Desire (1923), The Cost of Beauty (1924) and The Woman Tempted (1926).

Just before beginning of filming of The Man Without Desire, in which the actress played a young socialite, she was persuaded by Ivor Novello, appearing as a Venetian aristocrat, to change her name to "something that sounded less emetic".

She extended her career to France, Germany and Austria from 1924 with the new films La closerie des Genets (1924), Veille d'armes (1925), Männer vor der Ehe (1927), Café Elektric (1927), Die raffinierteste Frau Berlins (1927), A Murderous Girl (1927), Youth Astray (original title: Was die Kinder ihren Eltern verschweigen, 1927), Was weisst Du von der Liebe/Gefährdete Mädchen (1927), La vie miraculeuse de Thérèse Martin (1930). After a longer pause followed her first and last sound film at the same time with The Show Goes On (1937).

Other movies included Love in an Attic (1923) The School for Scandal (1923), Guy Fawkes (1923), The Money Habit (1924), We Women (1925), Before the Battle (1925), Graziella (1926), The Triumph of the Rat (1926), and Adventure Mad (1926).

== Selected filmography ==
- The Man Without Desire (1923)
- Guy Fawkes (1923)
- The Cost of Beauty (1924)
- The Money Habit (1924)
- We Women (1925)
- The Triumph of the Rat (1926)
- Three Cuckoo Clocks (1926)
- Graziella (1926)
- Men Before Marriage (1927)
- A Murderous Girl (1927)
- Café Elektric (1927)
- Endangered Girls (1927)
- The Show Goes On (1937)
