= Trousers (film) =

1920 film

- Directed by: Bertram Phillips
- Written by: Harry Engholm
- Starring: Queenie Thomas
- Release date: March 1920
- Country: United Kingdom
- Language: English

Trousers is a 1920 British silent romance film directed by Bertram Phillips and starring Queenie Thomas, Jack Leigh and Fred Morgan. The screenplay concerns a woman who dresses like a man and falls in love.

The exterior footage was shot at Burgh Island in Devon in summer 1919.

== Cast ==
- Queenie Thomas – Trousers
- Jack Leigh – Martin Chester
- Fred Morgan – Professor Dewbiggin
- Bernard Vaughan – Peter Salt
- Barbara Leigh – Trousers as a child
- Elizabeth Herbert
