= Mark Stein (author) =

American writer (born 1951)

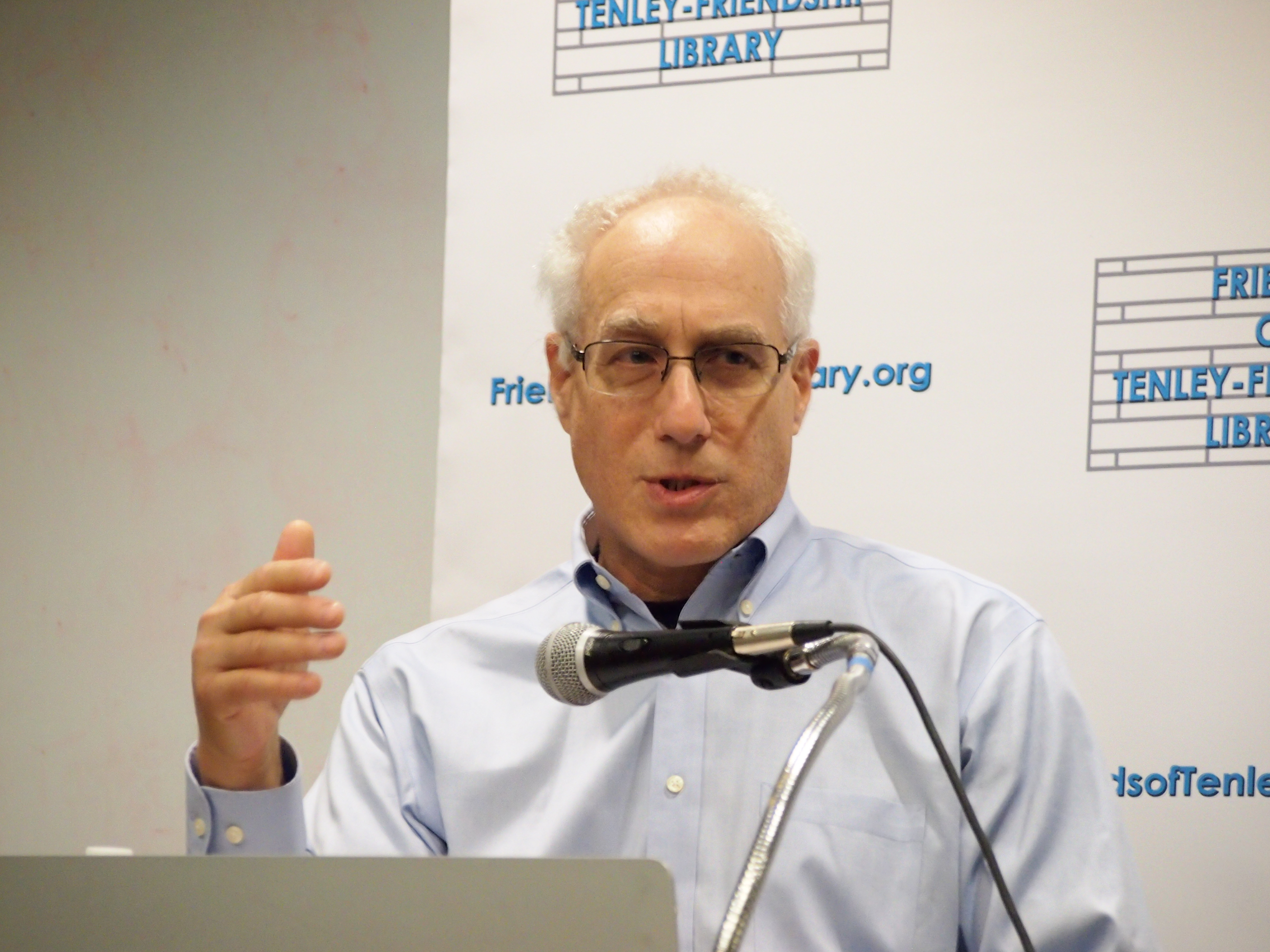
- Born: 1951 (age 74–75)
- Education: University of Wisconsin–Madison

Mark Stein (born 1951) is an American writer.

== Early life and education ==
Raised in Silver Spring, Maryland, he graduated from the University of Wisconsin–Madison in 1973.

== Career ==
Stein wrote the screenplay for the Goldie Hawn and Steve Martin film Housesitter. His stage plays were first produced at New Playwrights Theater of Washington, D.C. From there he went on to productions at Actors Theater of Louisville, Manhattan Theatre Club, South Coast Repertory, the Oregon Shakespeare Festival, the Fountain Theater in Los Angeles, the Royal Manitoba Theatre Centre, and elsewhere.

His non-fiction book, How the States Got Their Shapes, became the basis for a History Channel series by the same name.

== Works ==
Published plays

- The Groves of Academe and The Plumber's Apprentice (New York: Dramatists Play Service), 1983
- At Long Last Leo (New York: Dramatists Play Service), 1987
- Ghost Dance (New York: Playscripts Ltd., 2003)
- Direct from Death Row the Scottsboro Boys, (New York: Dramatists Play Service), 2006

Film and television

- A Quiet Little Neighborhood, A Perfect Little Murder, NBC Movie of the Week, (dir. Anson Williams; starring Teri Garr, Robert Urich), October 14, 1990
- Housesitter, Imagine Films/Universal Studios, (dir. Frank Oz; starring Steve Martin, Goldie Hawn), 1992
- Chance of a Lifetime, CBS Movie of the Week, (dir. Deborah Reinish; starring John Ritter, Jean Stapleton), March 29, 1998
- Help Wanted, Male, Episode of Nero Wolfe (dir. Timothy Hutton; starring Timothy Hutton, Maury Chakin, Bill Smitrovich, Larry Drake), 2002

Poetry

- My Baboons Padding Around (Utah: Kelsay Books, 2026)

ISBN 9798901468920

Non-fiction

- How the States Got Their Shapes (New York: Smithsonian/HarperCollins, 2008) ISBN 9780061431395, OCLC 503109709
- How the States Got Their Shapes Too: The People Behind the Borderlines (Washington, D.C.: Smithsonian Books, 2011)
- American Panic: A History of Who Scares Us and Why (New York: Palgrave Macmillan, 2014) ISBN 9781137279026, OCLC 869919504
- Vice Capades : Sex, Drugs, and Bowling from the Pilgrims to the Present, Lincoln: Potomac Books, 2017, ISBN 9781612348940, OCLC 962232609
- The Presidential Fringe : Questing & Jesting for the Oval Office, Lincoln: Potomac Books, 2020, ISBN 9781640120327, OCLC 1131089350
