= The White Star =

- Directed by: Bertram Phillips
- Written by: Bertram Phillips
- Starring: Queenie Thomas; Arthur Walcott
- Production company: Holmfirth Films
- Distributed by: Harma Photoplays
- Release date: December 1915
- Country: United Kingdom
- Languages: Silent; English intertitles

The White Star is a 1915 British silent drama film directed by Bertram Phillips and starring Queenie Thomas, Norman Howard and Arthur Walcott. It was made the Holmfirth Studios.

== Cast ==
- Queenie Thomas as Iris Ballard
- Norman Howard as David Marks
- Rowland Moore as Lord Hawksett
- Arthur Walcott as Julian Marks
- W. Willets as Wilson Harley
- L. Ashwell as Frank Ballard
- Alf Foy as Stage Door Keeper
- Syd Baker as Tramp
- Will Asher as Jack Higgs

== Bibliography ==
- Low, Rachael. History of the British Film, 1914-1918. Routledge, 2005.
