= Straws in the Wind =

1924 film

- Directed by: Bertram Phillips
- Written by: Lucita Squier; Frank Miller
- Story by: Burton George
- Produced by: Bertram Phillips
- Starring: Betty Ross Clarke; Queenie Thomas; Fred Paul
- Production company: BP Productions
- Distributed by: Gaumont British Distributors (UK)
- Release date: March 1924 (UK)
- Country: United Kingdom
- Languages: Silent; English intertitles

Straws in the Wind is a 1924 British silent drama film directed by Bertram Phillips and starring Betty Ross Clarke, Queenie Thomas and Fred Paul.

== Cast ==
- Betty Ross Clarke as The Wife
- Queenie Thomas as The Woman
- Fred Paul as The Husband
- Ivo Dawson as The Brute
- Clifford Cobbe as The Man
- Daisy James as The Friend
- C. Hargrave Mansell as The Thinker
- Jessie Matthews as The Village Maiden (uncredited)
