= The School for Scandal =

Play by Richard Brinsley Sheridan

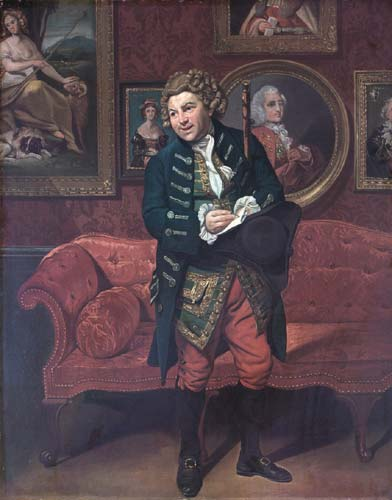
- Robert Baddeley as Moses (painting by Johann Zoffany, c.1781)
- Original language: English
- Written by: Richard Brinsley Sheridan
- Characters: Sir Peter Teazle; Lady Teazle; Sir Oliver Surface; Joseph Surface; Charles Surface; Maria; Lady Sneerwell; Sir Benjamin Backbite; Sir Harry Bumper; Careless; Rowley; Snake; Trip; Mrs Candour; Crabtree; Moses
- Genre: Comedy of manners
- Setting: London, UK

Premiere
- Date: 8 May 1777; Theatre Royal
- Place: United Kingdom

The School for Scandal is a comedy of manners written by the Anglo-Irish playwright and Whig politician Richard Brinsley Sheridan. The comedy was first performed in London at Drury Lane Theatre on 8 May 1777.

== Plot ==
=== Act I ===
Scene I: Lady Sneerwell, a wealthy young widow, and her hireling Snake discuss her various scandal-spreading plots. Snake asks why she is so involved in the affairs of Sir Peter Teazle, his ward Maria, and Charles and Joseph Surface, two young men under Sir Peter's informal guardianship, and why she has not yielded to the attentions of Joseph, who is highly respectable. Lady Sneerwell confides that Joseph desires Maria, who is an heiress, and that Maria desires Charles. Thus she and Joseph are plotting to alienate Maria from Charles by putting out rumours of an affair between Charles and Sir Peter's new young wife, Lady Teazle. Joseph arrives to confer with Lady Sneerwell. Maria herself then enters, fleeing the attentions of Sir Benjamin Backbite and his uncle, Crabtree. Mrs. Candour enters and ironically talks about how "tale-bearers are as bad as the tale-makers." Soon after that, Sir Benjamin and Crabtree also enter, bringing a good deal of gossip with them. One item is the imminent return of the Surface brothers' rich uncle Sir Oliver from the East Indies, where he has been for sixteen years; another is Charles' dire financial situation.

Scene II: Sir Peter complains of Lady Teazle's spendthrift ways. Rowley, the former steward of the Surfaces' late father, arrives, and Sir Peter gives him an earful on the subject. He also complains that Maria has refused Joseph, whom he calls "a model for the young men of the age," and seems attached to Charles, whom he denounces as a profligate. Rowley defends Charles, and then announces that Sir Oliver has just arrived from the East Indies. Oliver has instructed them not to tell his nephews of his arrival so that he may "make some trial of their dispositions".

=== Act II ===
Scene I: Sir Peter argues with his wife, Lady Teazle, refusing to be "ruined by [her] extravagance." He reminds her of her recent and far humbler country origins. Lady Teazle excuses herself by appealing to "the fashion", and departs to visit Lady Sneerwell. Despite their quarrel, Sir Peter still finds himself charmed by his wife even when she is arguing with him.

Scene II: At Lady Sneerwell's, the scandal-mongers have great fun at the expense of friends not present. Lady Teazle and Maria arrive; Lady Teazle joins in, but Maria is disgusted. So is Sir Peter, when he arrives, and rather breaks up the party with his comments. He departs, the others retire to the next room, and Joseph seizes the opportunity to court Maria, who rejects him again. Lady Teazle returns and dismisses Maria, and it is revealed that Lady Teazle is seriously flirting with Joseph – who doesn't want her, but cannot afford to alienate her.

Scene III: Sir Oliver calls on his old friend Sir Peter. He is amused by Sir Peter's marriage to a young wife. Their talk turns to the Surface brothers. Sir Peter praises Joseph's high morals but Sir Oliver suspects that he might be a hypocrite.

=== Act III ===
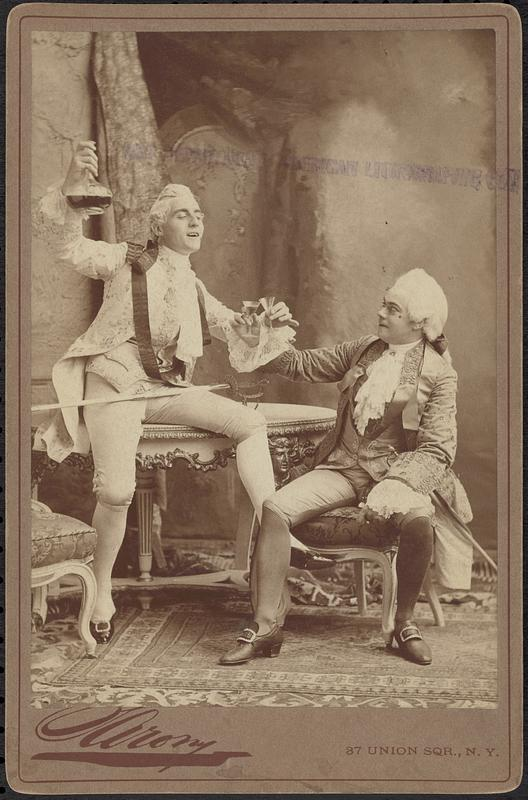
A scene from "The School for Scandal", ca. 1891–1895. Cabinet Card Collection, Boston Public Library

Scene I: Rowley describes his plan for Sir Oliver to visit each of the brothers incognito to test their characters. Sir Oliver will disguise himself as their needy relative Mr. Stanley, and ask each for his help. Rowley also brings in the "friendly Jew" Moses, a moneylender who has tried to help Charles, to explain Charles' position. Moses mentions that he is to introduce Charles to yet another moneylender ("Mr. Premium") that very evening. Sir Oliver decides (at Sir Peter's suggestion) that with Moses' assistance, he will pose as Premium when visiting Charles while still intending to visit Joseph as Stanley.

Sir Peter is left alone and when Maria enters, he tries to convince her to marry Joseph expressing him as a worthier match than Charles, whom she favours. When she is not persuaded, he threatens her with "the authority of a guardian". She goes, and Lady Teazle enters asking her husband for two hundred pounds. Sir Peter and Lady Teazle argue again, and conclude that they should separate.

Scene II: Sir Oliver (as Mr. Premium) arrives with Moses at Charles' house. While they are waiting in the hall, Trip, the servant, tries to negotiate a loan on his own account from Moses. Sir Oliver concludes that "this is the temple of dissipation indeed!"

Scene III: Charles and his raucous guests drink heavily and sing merry songs, as they prepare for a night of gambling. Charles raises a toast to Maria. Moses and "Premium" enter, and Sir Oliver is dismayed at the scene. Charles does not recognise his long-lost uncle. Charles frankly asks "Premium" for credit, noting that Sir Oliver (whom he believes is in India) will soon leave him a fortune. "Premium" discounts this possibility, noting that Sir Oliver could live many years, or disinherit his nephew. He asks if Charles has any valuables of his own to sell for immediate cash. Charles admits that he has sold the family silver and his late father's library, and offers to sell "Premium" the family portrait collection. "Premium" accepts, but Sir Oliver is silently outraged.

=== Act IV ===
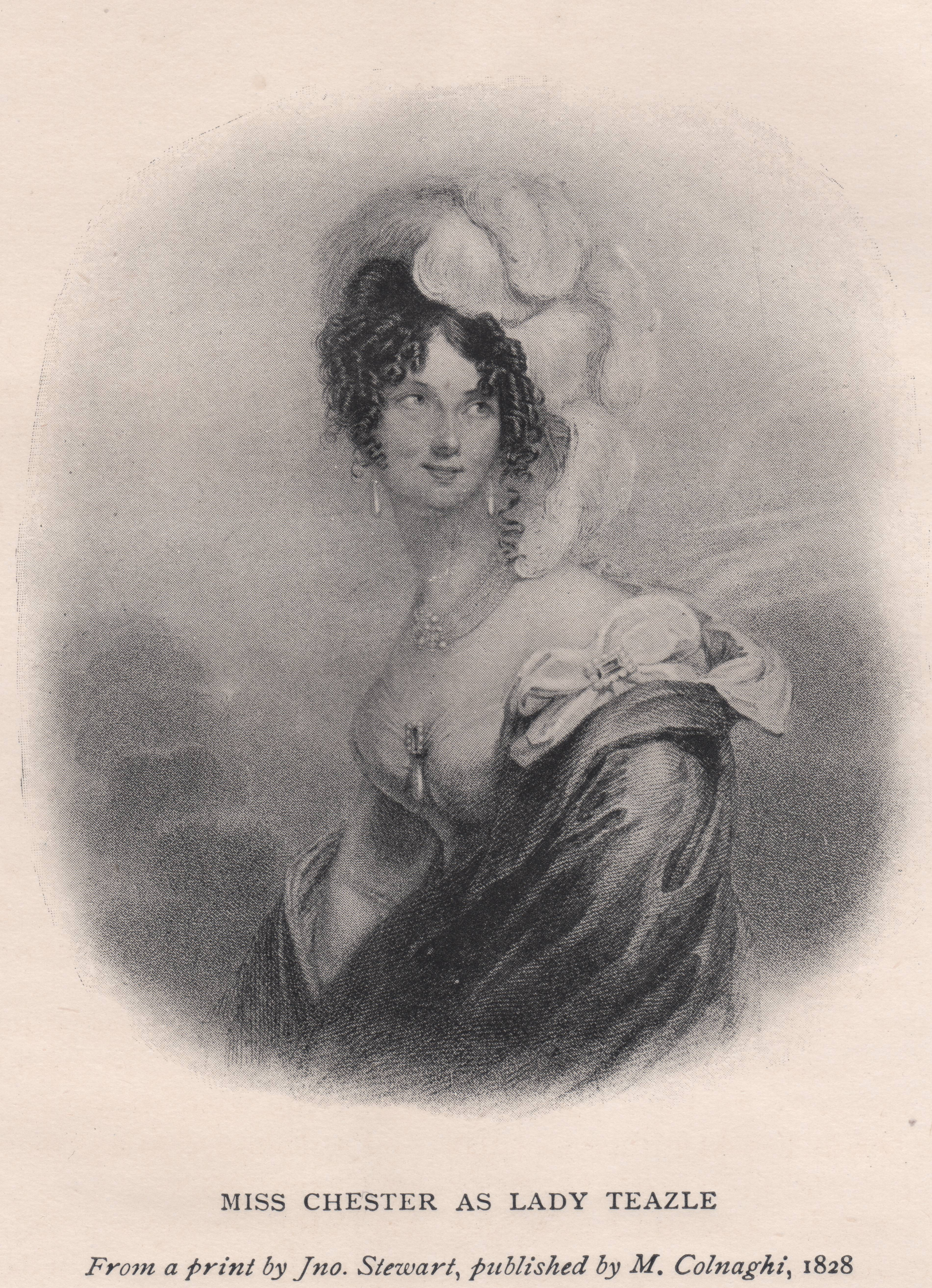
Miss Chester as Lady Teazle

Scene I: Charles goes on to sell all of the family portraits to "Premium", using the rolled-up family tree as a gavel. However, he refuses to sell the last portrait, which is of Sir Oliver, out of respect for his benefactor; Charles will not sell it even when "Premium" offers as much for it as for all the rest. Moved, Sir Oliver inwardly forgives Charles. Sir Oliver and Moses leave with Rowley entering shortly after, and Charles sends a hundred pounds of the proceeds for the relief of "Mr. Stanley", despite Rowley's objection.

Scene II: Sir Oliver, reflecting on Charles's character with Moses, is met by Rowley, who has brought him the hundred pounds sent to "Stanley." Declaring "I’ll pay his debts, and his benevolence too", Sir Oliver plans to go meet his other nephew in the person of Stanley.

Scene III: Joseph, anxiously awaiting a visit from Lady Teazle, is told by a servant that she has just left "her chair at the milliner's next door" and so has the servant draw a screen across the window (his reason: "my opposite neighbour is a maiden lady of so curious a temper"). On her entrance, Joseph forswears any interest in Maria, and flirts in earnest with Lady Teazle, perversely suggesting that she should make a "faux pas" for the benefit of her reputation. The servant returns to announce Sir Peter, and Lady Teazle hides in panic behind the screen. Sir Peter enters and tells Joseph that he suspects an affair between Charles and Lady Teazle (due to the rumours spread by Joseph and Lady Sneerwell). Joseph hypocritically professes confidence in Charles' and Lady Teazle's honour. Sir Peter confides his intention to give his wife a generous separate maintenance during his life and the bulk of his fortune on his demise. He also urges Joseph to pursue his suit with Maria (much to Joseph's annoyance, as Lady Teazle is listening behind the screen).

Charles's arrival is announced. Sir Peter decides to hide, and have Joseph sound Charles out about his relationship with Lady Teazle. He starts behind the screen, but sees the corner of Lady Teazle's petticoat there already. Joseph "confesses" that he is not as virtuous as he seems: "a little French milliner, a silly rogue that plagues me" is hiding there to preserve her own reputation. Sir Peter then hides in the closet.

Charles now enters and Joseph questions him about Lady Teazle. Charles disclaims any designs on her, noting that Joseph and the lady seem to be intimate. To stop Charles, Joseph whispers to him that Sir Peter is hiding in the closet, and Charles hauls him forth. Sir Peter tells Charles he now regrets his suspicions about him. Charles passes off his comments about Joseph and Lady Teazle as a joke.

When Lady Sneerwell is announced, Joseph rushes out to stop her from coming up. Meanwhile, Sir Peter tells Charles about the "French milliner". Charles insists on having a look at her and flings down the screen as Joseph returns, discovering Lady Teazle. Charles, very amused, leaves the other three dumbstruck individuals. Joseph concocts an explanation for Sir Peter of why he and Lady Teazle are together. But she refuses to endorse it and admits that she came to pursue an affair with Joseph; however, having learned of Sir Peter's generosity, she has repented. She denounces Joseph and exits, and the enraged Sir Peter follows as Joseph continues trying to pretend innocence.

=== Act V ===
Scene I: Sir Oliver (as Mr. Stanley) now visits Joseph. Joseph, like Charles, does not recognise his long-lost uncle. He greets "Stanley" with effusive professions of goodwill, but refuses to give "Stanley" any financial assistance, saying he has donated all his money to support Charles. "Stanley" suggests that Sir Oliver would help him if he were here, and that Joseph might pass on some of what Sir Oliver has given him. But Joseph tells "Stanley" that Sir Oliver is in fact very stingy, and has given him nothing except trinkets such as tea, shawls, birds and "Indian crackers". Furthermore, Joseph has lent a great deal to his brother, so that he has nothing left for "Stanley". Sir Oliver is enraged, as he knows both statements are flat lies – he sent Joseph 12,000 pounds from India. He stifles his anger, and departs amid further effusions. Rowley arrives with a letter for Joseph announcing that Sir Oliver has arrived in town.

Scene II: At Sir Peter's house, Lady Sneerwell, Mrs. Candour, Sir Benjamin, and Crabtree exchange confused rumours about the Teazle affair. Sir Benjamin says Sir Peter was wounded in a swordfight with Joseph Surface, while Crabtree insists it was a pistol duel with Charles. When Sir Oliver enters, they take him for a doctor and demand news of the wounded man. At that moment Sir Peter arrives to prove the report wrong, and orders the scandalmongers out of his house, with Rowley entering shortly after at hearing Sir Peter's raised voice. Sir Oliver says he has met both of his nephews and agrees with Sir Peter's (former) estimate of Joseph's high character, but then acknowledges with laughter that he knows the story of what happened at Joseph's with the closet and screen. When he leaves, Rowley tells Sir Peter that Lady Teazle is in tears in the next room, and Sir Peter goes to reconcile with her.

Scene III: Lady Sneerwell complains to Joseph that Sir Peter, now that he knows the truth about Joseph, will allow Charles to marry Maria. They plot to use Snake as a witness to a supposed relationship between Charles and Lady Sneerwell, and she withdraws.

Sir Oliver arrives. Joseph takes him for "Stanley" and orders him out. Charles arrives and recognises "Premium". Despite the identity confusion, both brothers want the man out before Sir Oliver comes. As Charles and Joseph try to eject their incognito uncle, Sir Peter and Lady Teazle arrive with Maria and Rowley, ending Sir Oliver's pretence. Sir Oliver, Sir Peter, and Lady Teazle together condemn Joseph, but Sir Oliver forgives Charles because of his refusal to sell Sir Oliver's picture and his generous aid to his uncle "Stanley". Maria, however, declines to give Charles her hand, citing his supposed involvement with Lady Sneerwell. Joseph now reveals Lady Sneerwell. Charles is baffled, and Rowley then summons Snake. Snake, however, has been bribed to turn against Sneerwell, so her lie is exposed. After Lady Teazle tells her that she (Lady Teazle) is withdrawing from the School for Scandal, Lady Sneerwell leaves in a rage, and Joseph follows, supposedly to keep her from further malicious attacks. Charles and Maria are reconciled. Charles makes no promises about reforming, but indicates that Maria's influence will keep him on a "virtuous path". The concluding line assures the audience that "even Scandal dies, if you approve."

=== Epilogue ===
The humorous epilogue, written by George Colman the Elder, is to be "Spoken by Lady Teazle." It portrays her as somewhat regretful of leaving country domesticity for London society, and includes an elaborate parody of a famous speech in Shakespeare's Othello.

== Revisions and variant versions ==
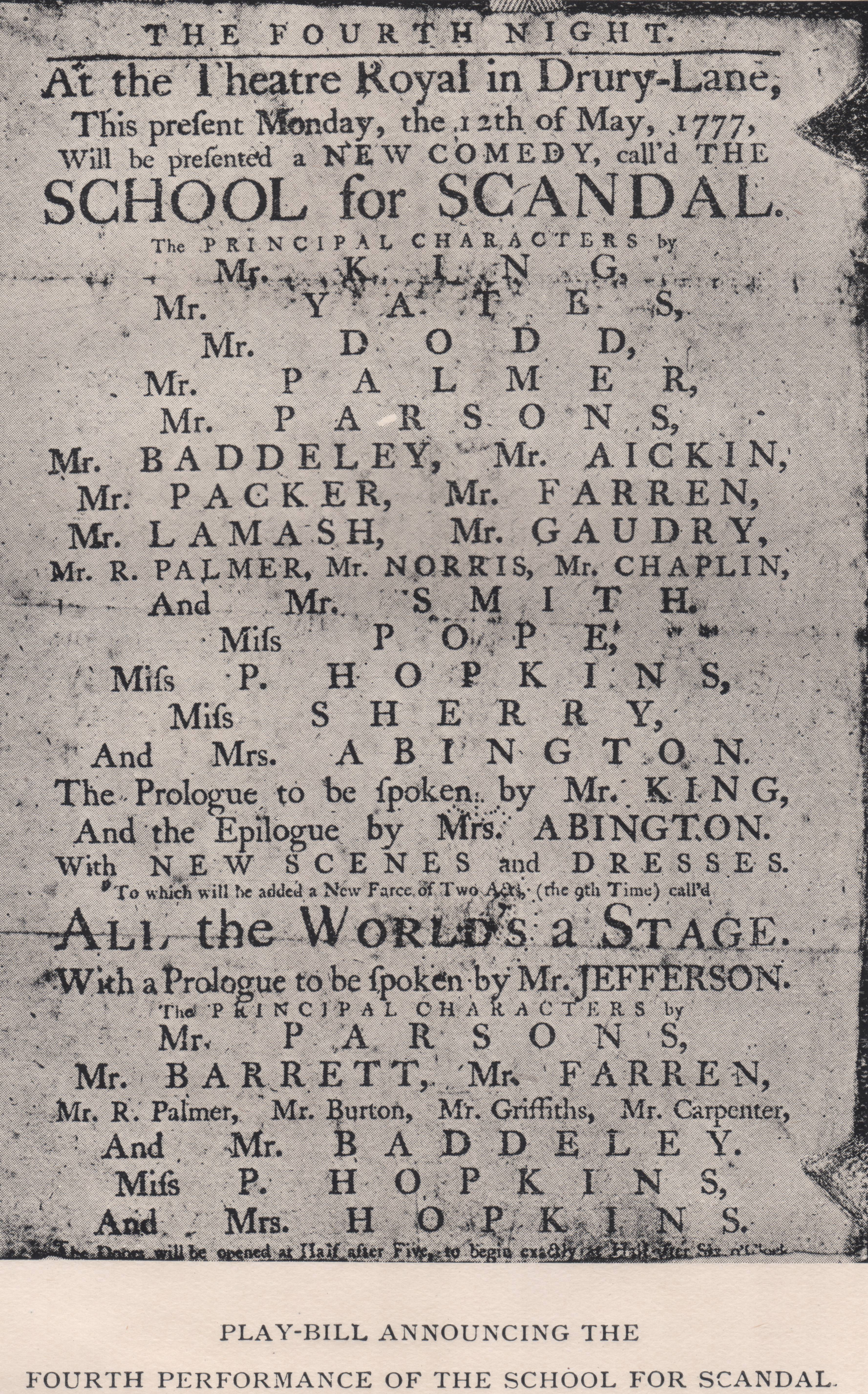
Playbill for the fourth performance of The School For Scandal (1777)

Various editions of the play exhibit several relatively minor textual differences. One reason is that Sheridan revised his text repeatedly, not only prior to its first production, but afterwards.

In its earliest stages, as detailed by Thomas Moore, Sheridan developed two separate play sketches, one initially entitled "The Slanderers" that began with Lady Sneerwell and Spatter (equivalent to Snake in the final version), and the other involving the Teazles. He eventually combined these and with repeated revisions and restructuring arrived at substantially the play that we have today.

The play did not appear in an authorised edition during Sheridan's lifetime, though it was printed in Dublin in 1788 from a copy that the author had sent to his sister.

Because, as one recent editor has put it, "The School for Scandal is the most intractable problem Sheridan set his editors", editions of this play can vary considerably. For example, the Penguin Classics edition gives a text based on the 1821 edition of The Works of the Late Right Honourable Richard Brinsley Sheridan published by Murray, Ridgeway, and Wilkie, but states that it has "been emended from earlier manuscripts" and gives a detailed listing of these emendations.

The prefatory material to the Project Gutenberg text of the play acknowledges that "Current texts may usually be traced, directly or indirectly", to the 1821 edition, but presents a far different text based on a manuscript in the author's hand.

In the Project Gutenberg text's version of I.1, Lady Sneerwell's accomplice is her cousin Miss Verjuice, not the socially inferior Snake (who appears only in V.3). Here is the opening of the play as given in that text (in which the editor has retained the original spelling and punctuation of Sheridan's manuscript found at Frampton Court):

LADY SNEERWELL at her dressing table with LAPPET; MISS VERJUICE drinking chocolate
LADY SNEERWELL. The Paragraphs you say were all inserted:
VERJUICE. They were Madam—and as I copied them myself in a feigned Hand there can be no suspicion whence they came.
LADY SNEERWELL. Did you circulate the Report of Lady Brittle's Intrigue with Captain Boastall?
VERJUICE. Madam by this Time Lady Brittle is the Talk of half the Town—and I doubt not in a week the Men will toast her as a Demirep.
LADY SNEERWELL. What have you done as to the insinuation as to a certain Baronet's Lady and a certain Cook.
VERJUICE. That is in as fine a Train as your Ladyship could wish. I told the story yesterday to my own maid with directions to communicate it directly to my Hairdresser. He I am informed has a Brother who courts a Milliners' Prentice in Pallmall whose mistress has a first cousin whose sister is Feme [Femme] de Chambre to Mrs. Clackit—so that in the common course of Things it must reach Mrs. Clackit's Ears within four-and-twenty hours and then you know the Business is as good as done.

Sheridan later deleted Verjuice and gave Snake most of her lines, as reflected in the 1821 edition and those editions that follow it. Here is the opening in that text:

Lady SNEERWELL'S House.
Discovered Lady SNEERWELL at the dressing-table; SNAKE drinking chocolate.
Lady Sneer. The paragraphs, you say, Mr. Snake, were all inserted?
Snake. They were, madam; and as I copied them myself in a feigned hand, there can be no suspicion whence they came.
Lady Sneer. Did you circulate the report of Lady Brittle's intrigue with Captain Boastall?
Snake. That's in as fine a train as your ladyship could wish. In the common course of things, I think it must reach Mrs. Clackitt's ears within four and twenty hours; and then, you know, the business is as good as done.

This is a significant difference, and some editors and performers have preferred the manuscript version that includes Miss Verjuice. However, the cast list of the first production of the play in 1777 has no "Miss Verjuice" listed, showing that the change Sheridan made to combine her part with Snake's predates the premiere.

Another example of strictly verbal differences between the two texts can be found in II.1, where the Project Gutenberg text has Lady Teazle rather more pointed in suggesting that Sir Peter can oblige her by making her his "widow" (only implied by her in the 1821 text, leaving him to fill in "My widow, I suppose?" and her to add "Hem! hem!"). Also, in Crabtree's recitation of the imaginary duel between Sir Peter and Charles Surface (V.2), the shot of Sir Peter bounces off a "little bronze Pliny" in the older version, but the bust is changed to one of "Shakspeare (sic)" in the 1821 text. Many other slight differences of a few words here and there can be found throughout the play (though these do not impact the plot the way that the deletion of Miss Verjuice does).

== Reception ==
The School for Scandal has been widely admired. The English critic William Hazlitt was particularly effusive in his praise of Sheridan's comedies in general ("everything in them tells; there is no labour in vain") and of this play in particular:

The School for Scandal is, if not the most original, perhaps the most finished and faultless comedy which we have. When it is acted, you hear people all around you exclaiming, "Surely it is impossible for anything to be cleverer." The scene in which Charles sells all the old family pictures but his uncle's, who is the purchaser in disguise, and that of the discovery of Lady Teazle when the screen falls, are among the happiest and most highly wrought that comedy, in its wide and brilliant range, can boast. Besides the wit and ingenuity of this play, there is a genial spirit of frankness and generosity about it, that relieves the heart as well as clears the lungs. It professes a faith in the natural goodness as well as habitual depravity of human nature.

Edmund Gosse called the play "perhaps the best existing English comedy of intrigue", while Charles Lamb wrote that "This comedy grew out of Congreve and Wycherley", but criticised "sentimental incompatibilities" even while admitting that "the gaiety upon the whole is buoyant."

Samuel Barber composed his first full orchestral work as an overture programmed for the play.

On the other hand, the play has also been criticised for some hints of anti-Semitism, specifically "the disparaging remarks made about moneylenders, who were often Jewish." It is true that the moneylender Moses is portrayed in a comparatively positive light, but the way he is described (as a "friendly Jew" and an "honest Israelite" by Rowley in III.1) suggest that he is in some way to be considered an exception to Jews in general; also, his own usurious business practices as stated to Sir Peter are clearly less than exemplary (e.g., his statement "If he appears not very anxious for the supply, you should require only forty or fifty per cent; but if you find him in great distress, and want the moneys very bad, you may ask double" [III.1]). It may be significant that in Johann Zoffany's portrait of Robert Baddeley as Moses, we find that "Under his arm Moses holds a rolled parchment of the Surface family tree that is used as an auction hammer, and he seems to be ticking off pictures in the catalogue", although in the play Careless is the auctioneer in the relevant scene (IV.1) and Moses has a relatively minor role.

It is notable that at least one 21st-century production (Los Angeles, 2004) has "sanitized most of what could be deemed as anti-Semitic content" by changing references to "Jews" and "Jewry" to "moneylenders"—a practice that a reviewer termed "PC-ification" of the play. Another production, by the Seattle Shakespeare Company in 2007, reportedly did not tamper with this aspect of the text and was commended by a reviewer for "the courage to face the script's unsavory side."

Another criticism that has been made of the play involves the characterisation. A writer in the 19th century periodical Appletons' Journal states that

The great defect of The School for Scandal – the one thing which shows the difference between a comic writer of the type of Sheridan and a great dramatist like Shakespeare – is the unvarying wit of the characters. And not only are the characters all witty, but they all talk alike. Their wit is Sheridan's wit, which is very good wit indeed; but it is Sheridan's own, and not Sir Peter Teazle's, or Backbite's, or Careless's, or Lady Sneerwell's.

The style of the play has also made it at times a problematic work to make effective in today's theatre. In appraising a 1999 staging of Sheridan's comedy at the Guthrie Theater in Minneapolis, Minnesota, one critic found the "staunchly orthodox production" to be lacking, commenting that

Sheridan's satirical bite, which is as venomous as Molière's and as quick as Wilde's, comes not from epigrammatic flourishes, but from the subtle undermining of Georgian social mores... In this realm, gossip is a form of social control, wielded by the essentially impotent elite to force conformity among their peers

Another reviewer in Variety noted of a 1995 production starring Tony Randall as Sir Peter Teazle that Sheridan's play was "such a superbly crafted laugh machine, and so timeless in delivering delectable comeuppance to a viper's nest of idle-rich gossipmongers, that you'd practically have to club it to death to stifle its amazing pleasures" – before claiming that this is precisely what the production being reviewed had done.

But in the hands of a talented director and cast, the play still offers considerable pleasure. A New York production of 2001 prompted praise in The New York Times for being "just the classy antidote one needs in a celebrity-crazed world where the invasion of privacy is out of control, but the art of gossip is nonexistent."

== Film and television adaptations ==
The play has been adapted to film numerous times.

In 1923, the silent British film The School for Scandal was produced and directed by Bertram Phillips. It starred Basil Rathbone, Frank Stanmore and Queenie Thomas.

The 1930 film The School for Scandal was the first sound adaptation of the play. The film is presumed to be lost.

The first television adaptation aired over the BBC 19 May 1937. Greer Garson starred. BBC-TV again produced the play in 1959.

In 1975, WNET/13 New York, in association with KTCA St. Paul-Minneapolis, broadcast a production by the Guthrie Theater adapted by Michael Bawtree.

== Original actors ==
These appeared in "The School for Scandal" 8 May 1777 at The Drury Lane Theatre in London

- John Palmer – as Joseph Surface
- Frances Abington – as Lady Teazle
- William 'Gentleman' Smith – as Charles Surface
- Jane Pope – as Mrs Candour

== Later notable actors ==
- It is recorded that Jane Austen, who was said to be a fine actor, had played the part of Mrs Candour in 1812 in a private production with great aplomb.
- The 1975 PBS Great Performances video directed by Michael Langham and Nich Havinga (made from the production at the Tyrone Guthrie Theatre the previous year) featured Larry Gates as Sir Oliver Surface, Kenneth Welsh as Charles Surface, Bernard Behrens as Sir Peter Teazle, Patricia Conolly as Lady Sneerwell, Ivar Brogger as Snake, Barbara Bryne as Mrs. Candour, Mark Lamos as Sir Benjamin Backbite, and Blair Brown as Lady Teazle.
- John Gielgud played Charles Surface in a legendary season at the Queens Theatre in 1937 and repeated the role under his own direction in a 1963 production that played in London, on Broadway, and Toronto's O'Keefe Centre. In the same production was Ralph Richardson, his wife Muriel Forbes, Gwen Ffrangcon-Davies, Richard Easton, and Laurence Naismith.
- Real life couple Laurence Olivier and Vivien Leigh played Sir Peter and Lady Teazle in a production of the play at the New Theatre as part of The Old Vic Company. The production also starred Peter Cushing and Terence Morgan.
- Donald Sinden as Sir Peter Teazle, Marc Sinden as Charles Surface, Googie Withers as Lady Sneerwell, directed by John Barton, Haymarket Theatre (transferred to the Duke of York's Theatre) in 1983 and then was chosen as the British Council's 50th anniversary tour of Europe in 1984.
