= Paula (1915 film) =

- Directed by: Cecil Birch
- Written by: Victoria Cross (novel)
- Starring: Hetty Payne; Frank McClellan
- Production company: Holmfirth Films
- Distributed by: Initial Films
- Release date: November 1915
- Country: United Kingdom
- Languages: Silent; English intertitles

Paula is a 1915 British silent drama film directed by Cecil Birch and starring Hetty Payne and Frank McClellan. It was made at the Holmfirth Studios in Yorkshire. The screenplay concerns a widow who follows her love to Italy, and dies after donating blood to save his life.

== Cast ==
- Hetty Payne as Paula
- Frank McClellan as Vincent Hallam

== Bibliography ==
- Warren, Patricia. British Film Studios: An Illustrated History. Batsford, 2001.
