= Clotilde Graves =

Irish author

Clotilde Augusta Inez Mary Graves by Herbert Rose Barraud

Clotilde Augusta Inez Mary Graves (3 June 1863 – 3 December 1932), also known as Clo. Graves, was an Irish author who wrote under the pseudonym of Richard Dehan, becoming a successful playwright in London and New York City.

Buttevant Castle, Co. Cork in 1880, the childhood home of Clo Graves

== Biography ==
Graves was born on 3 June 1863 at Buttevant Castle, County Cork, the third daughter of Major William Henry Graves (1825–1892) of the 18th Royal Irish Regiment and Antoinette, daughter of Captain George Anthony Deane of Harwich. She was a second cousin of Alfred Perceval Graves (1846–1931) – son of Rt. Rev. Charles Graves (1812–1899), the mathematician Anglican Bishop of Limerick, Ardfert and Ahadoe- father of the poet Robert Graves (1895–1985), and his brother Charles Patrick Graves (1899–1971).

At the age of nine, she moved with her family to England from their Irish home. She had seen a good deal of barrack life, and at Alvington Lodge, Granada Street, Southsea, where they went to live, she acquired a large knowledge of both services in the circle of naval and military friends they made there, and this knowledge years afterward, she turned to good account in her novel Between Two Thieves.

Educated at a convent in Lourdes, she converted to Catholicism and came to London where she studied art at Bloomsbury. She was an unusual figure in London society, wearing her hair short, affecting a masculine manner and cut of clothing, and smoking cigarettes in public when such characteristics were considered eccentric.

In 1884, Clotilde Graves became an art student and worked at the British Museum galleries and the Royal Female School of Art, helping to support herself by journalism, among other things drawing little pen-and-ink grotesques for the comic papers. She abandoned art and took an engagement in a travelling theatrical company. In 1888, her first chance as a dramatist came. She was again in London, working vigorously at journalism, when someone was needed to write extra lyrics for a pantomime then in preparation. A letter of recommendation from an editor to the manager ended in Miss Clo Graves writing the pantomime of Puss in Boots. Later a tragedy by her, Nitocris, was produced at Drury Lane, and another of her plays, The Mother of Three, proved not only a literary, but also a financial success.

In 1900, she lived in Hampstead and possessed a collection of Chinese and Japanese trophies. She was an enthusiastic fly-fisher and tricyclist.

Embarking on a literary career, Edmund Yates thought her stories ideal for his magazine World, and she also contributed to Punch. She became a successful London and New York playwright who enjoyed considerable literary acclaim in the first decades of the 20th century. With the actress Gertrude Kingston she wrote the play A Matchmaker, which gained a certain notoriety when it was criticised for comparing marriage to prostitution.

In 1911, at the age of forty-six, her first novel was published under the pseudonym of Richard Dehan. The significant thing was that in publishing her novel, The Dop Doctor (American title: One Braver Thing), Clotilde Graves chose the pen name of Richard Dehan, although she was already known as a writer (chiefly for the theatre) under her own name. It was made into a film of the same name in 1915 by Fred Paul. The film gave considerable offence in South Africa due to the harsh portrayal of English and Dutch characters. It was eventually banned under the Defence of the Realm Act. The story's protagonist is a drunken and disgraced medic who eventually makes his way to South Africa where he redeems his honour at the Siege of Mafeking. Albert Gérard, in his European-language writing in Sub Saharan Africa ISBN 963-05-3832-6, regards the book's description of the siege of Mafeking "as a heroic justification of British Imperial strategy and the vindication of a belief in the righteousness and superiority of the British cause. The Dop Doctor contains pro-Jingo arguments of the type which offers the stereotypical portrait of the Boer as backward and despicably primitive, and the black man as a shadow figure behind the civilizing foreground, an appendage of an argument over what to do with his labour". The incidentals of the novel, however, should not distract from its primary objective of tracing a story of redemption through expiatory suffering and kenosis, a subject much explored by writers, in several European languages, connected with the literary renouveau catholique movement.

The Dop Doctor was followed, two years later, by Between Two Thieves. This novel has as a leading character Florence Nightingale under the name of Ada Merling. The story was at first to have been called "The Lady with the Lamp"; but the author delayed it for a year and subjected it to a complete rewriting, the result of a new and enlarged conception of the story.

She died at the convent of Our Lady of Lourdes at Hatch End, Middlesex, on 3 December 1932.

== Publications ==
Novels

- A Field of Tares, Harper, London 1891.
- Dragon's Teeth, Robert Holden, London 1891.
- Maids in a Market Garden, Collins, London 1894.
- A Well Meaning Woman, London 1896.
- The Dop Doctor, Heinemann, London 1910.
- One Braver Thing, A. L. Burt, London 1910.
- Between Two Thieves, Heinemann, London 1912.
- The Headquarter Recruit, and Other Stories, Frederick A Stokes Co, New York 1913.
- The Cost of Wings, Heinemann, London 1914. (A collection of short stories.)
- Off Sandy Hook, Heinemann, London 1915.
- The Man of Iron, Frederick A. Stokes, New York 1915.
- A Gilded Vanity, George H. Doran, New York 1916.
- Earth to Earth, Heinemann, London 1916.
- That Which Hath Wings, G. P. Putnam and Sons, New York, 1918.
- A Sailor's Home and Other Stories, George H. Doran, New York 1919.
- The Eve of Pascua And Other Stories, George H. Doran, New York, 1920.
- The Villa of the Peacock And Other Stories, Heinemann, London, 1921.
- The Just Steward, Heinemann, London, 1922.
- The Sower of the Wind, Little, Brown, and Company, Boston 1927.
- Lovers of the Market Place, Little, Brown, Boston, 1928.
- Shallow Seas, Thornton Butterworth, London, 1930.
- The Lovers Battle.
- Under the Hermes.

Plays

- Nitocris
- Drury Lane Pantomime, Puss in Boots
- Dr. And Mrs. Neill
- A Mother of Three, Comedy Theatre, 11 April 1896.
- A Matchmaker
- The Bishop's Eye, Vaudeville Theatre, 24 February 1900.
- The Forest Lovers
- A Maker of Comedies
- The Bond of Nikon
- A Tenement Tragedy
