= The Dop Doctor =

1915 South African drama film

- Directed by: Fred Paul
- Written by: Clotilde Graves (Richard Dehan); Harry Engholm
- Starring: Fred Paul, Agnes Glynn, Bertram Burleigh
- Production company: Samuelson Film Manufacturing Company
- Release dates: 1915 (South Africa); 21 January 1916 (USA)
- Country: South Africa
- Language: English

The Dop Doctor, also known as The Love Trail or The Terrier and the Child, is a 1915/16 South African drama film directed by Fred Paul. It is based on the book, The Dop Doctor, by Clotilde Graves.

== Plot ==
The film depicts the Siege of Mafeking (1899–1900) during the Second Boer War through the scenario of an orphan girl who loves a soldier but is married to an exiled doctor.

== Censorship ==
The film is notable for being the first South African film to be prohibited or censored. The government of Prime Minister Louis Botha banned the film under the Defence of the Realm Act as "the film wrongly represents the Boers as being cheats and immoral."
