= Cordelia the Magnificent =

1923 film by George Archainbaud

- Directed by: George Archainbaud
- Written by: Leroy Scott (novel); Frank S. Beresford
- Produced by: Samuel Zierler
- Starring: Clara Kimball Young; Huntley Gordon; Carol Halloway; Lloyd Whitlock; Jacqueline Gadsden; Lewis Dayton; Mary Jane Irving; Catherine Murphy; Elinor Hancock
- Cinematography: Charles Richardson
- Distributed by: Metro Pictures
- Release date: April 30, 1923
- Running time: 7 reels; 6,800 feet
- Country: United States
- Language: Silent (English intertitles)

Cordelia the Magnificent is a 1923 American silent mystery film directed by George Archainbaud and starring Clara Kimball Young. It is now believed to be a lost film.

== Plot summary ==
Cordelia, a smart and pretty society girl, becomes suddenly impoverished but decides to get a job rather than marry for money. A complicated blackmail plot ensues.

== Cast ==
- Clara Kimball Young
- Huntley Gordon
- Carol Halloway
- Lloyd Whitlock
- Jacqueline Gadsden
- Lewis Dayton
- Mary Jane Irving
- Catherine Murphy
- Elinor Hancock

== Release ==
According to surviving accounts, the film was not well reviewed by major publications. It was, however, commercially successful.
