= Three Cuckoo Clocks =

1926 film directed by Lothar Mendes

- American poster
- Directed by: Lothar Mendes
- Written by: Georg Mühlen-Schulte; (novel); Robert Liebmann
- Produced by: Erich Pommer
- Starring: Lillian Hall-Davis; Nina Vanna; Nils Asther; Paul Graetz
- Cinematography: Fritz Arno Wagner
- Production company: UFA
- Distributed by: UFA (Germany); Paramount Pictures (US)
- Release date: 25 May 1926
- Country: Germany
- Languages: Silent; German intertitles

Three Cuckoo Clocks (German: Die drei Kuckucksuhren) is a 1926 German silent drama film directed by Lothar Mendes and starring Lillian Hall-Davis, Nina Vanna and Nils Asther. The film's sets were designed by the art director Hans Jacoby. It premiered at the Gloria-Palast in Berlin on 25 May 1926. It was based on a novel by Georg Mühlen-Schulte. Unlike many of Mendes' films from the period, which are now considered lost, it still survives. It was released in the United States by Paramount Pictures under the alternative title of Adventure Mad.

== Cast ==
- Lillian Hall-Davis as Gladys Clifton
- Nina Vanna as Mary Davids
- Nils Asther as Reginald Ellis
- Eric Barclay as Lord Ernest Clifton
- Paul Graetz as Hotel Manager
- Albert Steinrück as Mason
- Hermann Vallentin as Lakington

== Bibliography ==
- Bock, Hans-Michael & Bergfelder, Tim. The Concise CineGraph. Encyclopedia of German Cinema. Berghahn Books, 2009.
- Hardt, Ursula. From Caligari to California: Erich Pommer's Life in the International Film Wars. Berghahn Books, 1996.
