= We Women =

1925 film

- Directed by: W. P. Kellino
- Written by: Lydia Hayward; W.J. Roberts
- Starring: Beatrice Ford; Pauline Cartwright; John Stuart; Reginald Bach
- Cinematography: William Shenton
- Edited by: Challis Sanderson
- Production company: Stoll Pictures
- Distributed by: Stoll Pictures
- Release date: February 1925
- Running time: 5,100 feet
- Country: United Kingdom
- Languages: Silent; English intertitles

We Women is a 1925 British silent comedy film directed by W. P. Kellino and starring Beatrice Ford, Pauline Cartwright, and John Stuart. It depicts the adventures of the flappers Billie and Dollie, who work as dance hostesses.

== Cast ==
- Beatrice Ford as Billie
- Pauline Cartwright as Dollie
- John Stuart as Michael Rivven
- Reginald Bach as Badderley
- Nina Vanna as Kitty Pragnell
- Charles Ashton as Bart Simmons
- Cecil del Gue as Flash Wheeler

== Bibliography ==
- Hunter, I.Q. & Porter, Laraine. British Comedy Cinema. Routledge, 2012.
- Low, Rachael. History of the British Film, 1918–1929. George Allen & Unwin, 1971.
