= The Show Goes On (film) =

1937 British film by Basil Dean

- Directed by: Basil Dean
- Written by: Basil Dean; Anthony Kimmins; Austin Melford
- Produced by: Basil Dean
- Starring: Gracie Fields; Owen Nares; John Stuart; Horace Hodges
- Cinematography: Jan Stallich
- Edited by: Jack Kitchin
- Music by: Ernest Irving
- Production company: Associated Talking Pictures
- Distributed by: ABFD
- Release date: April 1937
- Running time: 93 minutes
- Country: United Kingdom
- Language: English

The Show Goes On is a 1937 British musical comedy film directed by Basil Dean and starring Gracie Fields, Owen Nares and John Stuart.

== Premise ==
The Show Goes On is a semi-biographical film about Sally Scowcroft (Gracie Fields) who is a mill worker who is plucked from obscurity and thrust towards fame and fortune by an ailing composer (Owen Nares) who needs a singer to perform his work.

== Cast ==
- Gracie Fields as Sally Scowcroft
- Owen Nares as Martin Fraser
- John Stuart as Mack McDonald
- Horace Hodges as Sam Bishop
- Edward Rigby as Mr. Scowcroft, Sally's Father
- Amy Veness as Mrs. Scowcroft, Sally's Mother
- Arthur Sinclair as Mike O'Hara
- Cyril Ritchard as Jimmy
- Jack Hobbs as Nicholson
- Dennis Arundell as Felix Flack
- Billy Merson as Manager
- Frederick Leister as O.B. Dalton
- Patrick Barr as Designer
- Nina Vanna as Maniana
- Tom Payne as Professor Augustino
- Queenie Leonard as Lilith Henderson
- Frank Atkinson as Actor at O'Hara's Agency
- Warren Earl Fisk as Townsman
- Walter Fitzgerald as Soldier with His Family on Troopship
- Laurence Hanray as Waiter
- Mike Johnson as Busker
- Andreas Malandrinos as Finale Set Designer
- Jack Vyvian as Stage Manager at Pantomime
