= Rock of Ages (1918 film) =

- Directed by: Bertram Phillips
- Written by: Kenelm Foss
- Produced by: H. B. Parkinson
- Starring: Queenie Thomas; Leslie George; Ronald Power
- Production company: Screen Plays
- Distributed by: Walturdaw
- Release date: 1918
- Country: United Kingdom
- Language: Silent

Rock of Ages is a 1918 British silent drama film directed by Bertram Phillips and starring Queenie Thomas, Leslie George and Ronald Power. An Irish model converts an artist to religion. Its title refers to the hymn Rock of Ages.

== Cast ==
- Queenie Thomas - Biddie Kinsella
- Leslie George - Austin Summers
- Ronald Power - The Master
- Bernard Vaughan - Father O'Flynn
- Charles Garry - Pat Reilly
- Lottie Blackford - Widdie Kinsella
- Ernest A. Douglas - Priest
