= The Woman Tempted =

1926 film

- Directed by: Maurice Elvey
- Written by: Sidney Morgan
- Based on: The Woman Tempted by Vera, Countess Cathcart
- Produced by: John Maxwell; Maurice Elvey
- Starring: Juliette Compton; Warwick Ward; Nina Vanna
- Production company: Maurice Elvey Productions
- Distributed by: Wardour Films; Aywon Pictures (US)
- Release date: 14 March 1927
- Running time: 89 minutes
- Country: United Kingdom
- Languages: Silent; English intertitles

The Woman Tempted is a 1926 British silent drama film directed by Maurice Elvey and starring Juliette Compton, Warwick Ward and Nina Vanna. It was based on a novel by Vera, Countess Cathcart. The film was shot at Cricklewood Studios, and was backed by John Maxwell's Wardour Films which was dramatically increasing its role in the film industry. It was first given a trade show screening in June 1926, but did not go on full release until the following March. By that time Elvey had departed to work for Maxwell's rival Gaumont-British.

== Premise ==
A young woman murders another woman whose behaviour drove her fiancé to suicide.

== Cast ==
- Juliette Compton as Louise Harding
- Warwick Ward as Jimmy Davies
- Nina Vanna as Maud Edworth
- Malcolm Tod as Basil Gilmore
- Joan Morgan as Sybil Helmsley
- Adeline Hayden Coffin as Mrs. Edworth
- Judd Green

== Bibliography ==
- Goble, Alan. The Complete Index to Literary Sources in Film. Walter de Gruyter, 1999.
- Low, Rachael. The History of the British Film 1918-1929. George Allen & Unwin, 1971.
