= Dallas Cairns =

Australian actor and director (1883–1941)

Dallas Cairns (1883–1941) was an Australian actor and director of the silent film era.

His stage roles included in the original Broadway production of Bernard Shaw's Pygmalion with Mrs Patrick Campbell, in 1914.

He was born in Frederick Dallas Cairns in Melbourne, Australia and died in London, England, UK.

== Selected filmography ==
Year	Title	Role
1917	The Princess of Happy Chance	Prince Jocelyn
1919	Comradeship	Liebemann
1919	The Silver Greyhound	
1923	Guy Fawkes	Mounteagle
1923	The Royal Oak	Pendrel
1924	Sally Bishop	Mr Durlacher
1926	The Hound of the Deep	Mr Bullyer
1928	Far Valour	Husband
