= The Last Witness (1925 film) =

1925 film directed by Fred Paul

- Directed by: Fred Paul
- Written by: F. Britten Austin (novel)
- Starring: Fred Paul; Isobel Elsom; Stella Arbenina
- Production company: Stoll Pictures
- Distributed by: Stoll Pictures
- Release date: August 1925
- Running time: 60 minutes
- Country: United Kingdom
- Languages: Silent; English intertitles

The Last Witness is a 1925 British silent crime film directed by Fred Paul and starring Paul, Isobel Elsom and Stella Arbenina. The screenplay concerns a barrister who prosecutes his own wife, who has recently had an affair with a Member of Parliament, for murder. It was based on a novel by F. Britten Austin.

== Cast ==
- Fred Paul as Stephen Brand KC
- Isobel Elsom as Letitia Brand
- Stella Arbenina as Mrs. Stapleton
- Queenie Thomas as Lady Somerville
- John F. Hamilton as Eric Norton
- Tom Nesbitt as Maurice Tregarthen
- Aubrey Fitzgerald as Lord Bunny Somerville
