= Männer vor der Ehe =

1927 film

- Directed by: Constantin J. David
- Written by: Victor Abel; Alfred Zeisler
- Cinematography: Karl Attenberger
- Music by: Artur Guttmann
- Production companies: Groß-Film; Sternheim Film
- Distributed by: Deulig-Verleih
- Release date: 22 June 1927
- Country: Germany
- Languages: Silent; German intertitles

Männer vor der Ehe ("Men Before Marriage") is a 1927 German silent film directed by Constantin J. David and starring Nina Vanna, Kurt Vespermann and Julius Falkenstein.

== Cast ==
- Charles Lincoln as Der reiche Junggeselle
- Kurt Vespermann as Der arme Junggeselle
- Julius Falkenstein as Der unerschütterliche Junggeselle
- Anton Pointner as Der leichtsinniger Junggeselle
- Carl Auen as Der glückliche Ehemann
- Dina Diercks as Die glücklicher Ehefrau
- Nina Vanna as Das junge Mädchen
- Käthe von Nagy as Der Backfisch
- Hanni Weisse as Die 'Freundin'
- Hilde Maroff as Das Mädchen, das nicht 'nein' sagen kann
- Eva Held as Die Sekretärin mit den schönen Beinen
- Grete Schmidt as Die 'filia hospitalis'
- Valeska Stock as Ihre Mutter, Vermieterin

== Bibliography ==
- Bock, Hans-Michael & Bergfelder, Tim. The Concise CineGraph. Encyclopedia of German Cinema. Berghahn Books, 2009.
