= Endangered Girls (1927 film) =

1927 film

- Directed by: Heinz Schall
- Written by: Helene Lackner
- Starring: Nina Vanna; Margarete Kupfer; Harry Hardt
- Cinematography: Paul Holzki
- Production company: Koop-Film
- Release date: 20 July 1927
- Country: Germany
- Languages: Silent; German intertitles

Endangered Girls (German: Gefährdete Mädchen) is a 1927 German silent film directed by Heinz Schall and starring Nina Vanna, Margarete Kupfer and Harry Hardt.

The film's sets were designed by the art director Karl Machus.

== Cast ==
- Nina Vanna
- Margarete Kupfer
- Harry Hardt
- Kurt Gerron
- Ferry Sikla
- Carl de Vogt

== Bibliography ==
- Barbara Felsmann & Karl Prümm. Kurt Gerron - gefeiert und gejagt. Edition Hentrich, 1992.
