= How the States Got Their Shapes =

US history TV show

- Starring: Brian Unger
- Country of origin: United States
- Original language: English
- No. of seasons: 2 (+ 1 special)
- No. of episodes: 29 (+ 1 special)

Production
- Production location: United States of America
- Running time: 44 minutes (season 1); 23 minutes (season 2) (+ 2 hour special)

Original release
- Network: History Channel
- Release: April 6, 2010 – December 22, 2012

How the States Got Their Shapes is an American television series that aired on the History Channel. It is hosted by Brian Unger and is based on Mark Stein's book How the States Got Their Shapes. The show deals with how the various states of the United States established their borders but also delves into other aspects of history, including failed states, proposed new states, and the local culture and character of various U.S. states. It thus tackles the "shapes" of the states in a metaphorical sense as well as a literal sense.

Each episode has a particular theme, such as how the landscape, language, or natural resources contributed to the borders and character of various U.S. states. The show format follows Unger as he travels to various locations and interviews local people, visits important historical and cultural sites, and provides commentary from behind the wheel of his car as he drives from location to location. Interspersed with these segments are brief historical synopses by notable U.S. historians.

The show started as a single two-hour special which first aired in April 2010 but returned as a regular series of one-hour shows starting in May 2011. Season 2 premiered in the fall of 2012, with a slightly reality-oriented format and episodes shortened to 30 minutes, airing Saturdays on H2, with encore showings on Friday night on the History channel. Many of season 2's episodes contained material already covered in season 1.

== Series overview ==
Season	Episodes	Originally released	
Season	Episodes	First released	Last released
Special		April 6, 2010	
1	10	May 3, 2011	July 12, 2011
2	19	September 29, 2012	December 22, 2012

== Episodes ==
=== Special (2010) ===
No. overall	Title	Original release date
1	"How the States Got Their Shapes"	April 6, 2010

=== Season 1 (2011) ===
No. overall	No. in season	Title	Original release date
2	1	"A River Runs Through It"	May 3, 2011
3	2	"The Great Plains, Trains, & Automobiles"	May 10, 2011
4	3	"Force of Nature"	May 17, 2011
5	4	"State of Rebellion"	May 24, 2011
6	5	"Living on the Edge"	June 7, 2011
7	6	"Use It or Lose It"	June 14, 2011
8	7	"Church And States"	June 21, 2011
9	8	"A Boom with a View"	June 28, 2011
10	9	"Culture Clash"	July 5, 2011
11	10	"Mouthing Off"	July 12, 2011

=== Season 2 (2012) ===
No. overall	No. in season	Title	Original release date
12	1	"Red State vs. Blue State"	September 29, 2012
13	2	"White Collar vs. Blue Collar"	September 29, 2012
14	3	"Hillbilly vs. Redneck"	October 6, 2012
15	4	"Hatfields vs. McCoys"	October 6, 2012
16	5	"North vs. South"	October 13, 2012
17	6	"BigFoot vs. Aliens"	October 13, 2012
18	7	"Great Lakes, Big Stakes"	October 20, 2012
19	8	"Battle of the Bible Belt"	October 20, 2012
20	9	"Vice vs. Virtue"	October 27, 2012
21	10	"MidWest vs. The Rest"	October 27, 2012
22	11	"Is West Best?"	November 3, 2012
23	12	"City vs. Country"	November 3, 2012
24	13	"East vs. West"	November 10, 2012
25	14	"Rebels & Outlaws"	November 17, 2012
26	15	"Mess with Texas"	November 24, 2012
27	16	"State vs. State"	December 8, 2012
28	17	"Rich vs. Poor"	December 8, 2012
29	18	"Big vs. Small"	December 15, 2012
30	19	"The United Shapes of America"	December 22, 2012

== See also ==
- List of state and territory name etymologies of the United States
- Territorial evolution of the United States
- United States territorial acquisitions
