= The Chance of a Lifetime (novel) =

Book by Nathaniel Gould

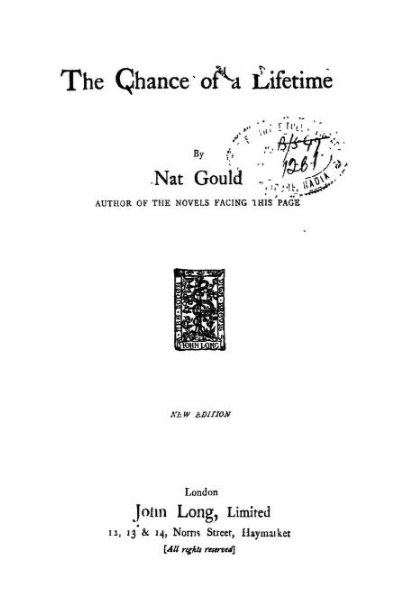
- Title page for The Chance of a Lifetime (1915)
- Author: Nathaniel Gould
- Language: English
- Genre: Sports
- Publication date: 1907
- Publication place: United Kingdom
- Media type: Print

The Chance of a Lifetime is a 1907 sports novel by the British-Australian writer Nathaniel Gould. Set in the world of English horse racing, it concerns the theft of a gold cup.

== Film adaptation ==
In 1916, the novel served as a basis for the British silent film The Chance of a Lifetime directed by Bertram Phillips.

== Bibliography ==
- Goble, Alan. The Complete Index to Literary Sources in Film. Walter de Gruyter, 1999.
