= For Valour (1928 film) =

1928 film

- Directed by: G. B. Samuelson
- Written by: G. B. Samuelson
- Produced by: G. B. Samuelson
- Starring: Dallas Cairns; Mary Rorke; Roy Travers
- Production company: G. B. Samuelson Productions
- Distributed by: Victoria Films
- Release date: October 1928
- Running time: 6,120 feet
- Country: United Kingdom
- Language: English

For Valour is a 1928 British silent war film directed by G. B. Samuelson and starring Dallas Cairns, Mary Rorke and Roy Travers. It was part of a cycle of 1920s British films portraying the First World War. It was generally poorly received by critics.

== Cast ==
- Dallas Cairns
- Roy Travers
- Mary Rorke
- Marjorie Stallor

== Bibliography ==
- Low, Rachael. History of the British Film, 1918-1929. George Allen & Unwin, 1971.
- Wood, Linda. British Films 1927-1939. British Film Institute, 1986.
