= Queenie Thomas =

British actress (1898–1977)

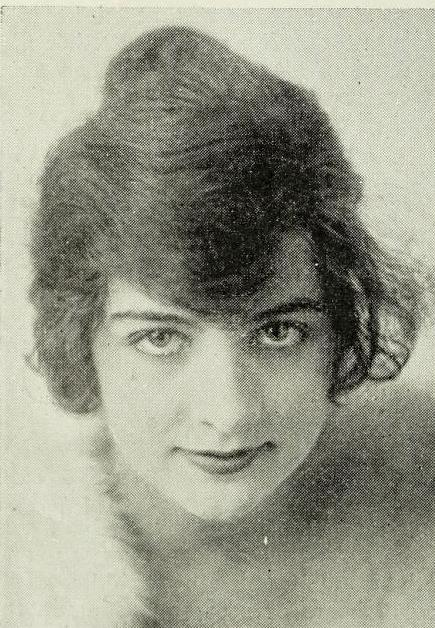
- Queenie Thomas, from a 1921 publication
- Born: Marjorie Violet Queenie Thomas; 18 June 1898; Cardiff, Wales, UK
- Died: 11 October 1977 (aged 79); England, UK
- Other name: Regina Thomas
- Occupation: Actress

Marjorie Violet Queenie Thomas (18 June 1898 – 11 October 1977) was a British actress who appeared in silent films, and was dubbed "The British isles Mary Pickford".

== Early life ==
Marjorie Violet Queenie Thomas was born in Cardiff, Wales, on 18 June 1898, the daughter of William Masters Thomas.

== Career ==
She and director Bertram Phillips often worked on films together, including an adaptation of The School for Scandal (1923), in which she played Lady Teazle opposite a young Basil Rathbone. "Considerable efforts were made to publicize her as a star," noted one film historian of Thomas. She was often shown enjoying outdoor sports such as fishing, golf, and ice skating in photographs printed in newspapers and magazines, and was referred to as "England's Mary Pickford."

== Personal life ==
She married engineer George Newman in 1919. Their honeymoon trip, a short flight to Paris, was the subject of a newsreel clip by British Pathé. She died on 11 October 1977 in England, at the age of 79.

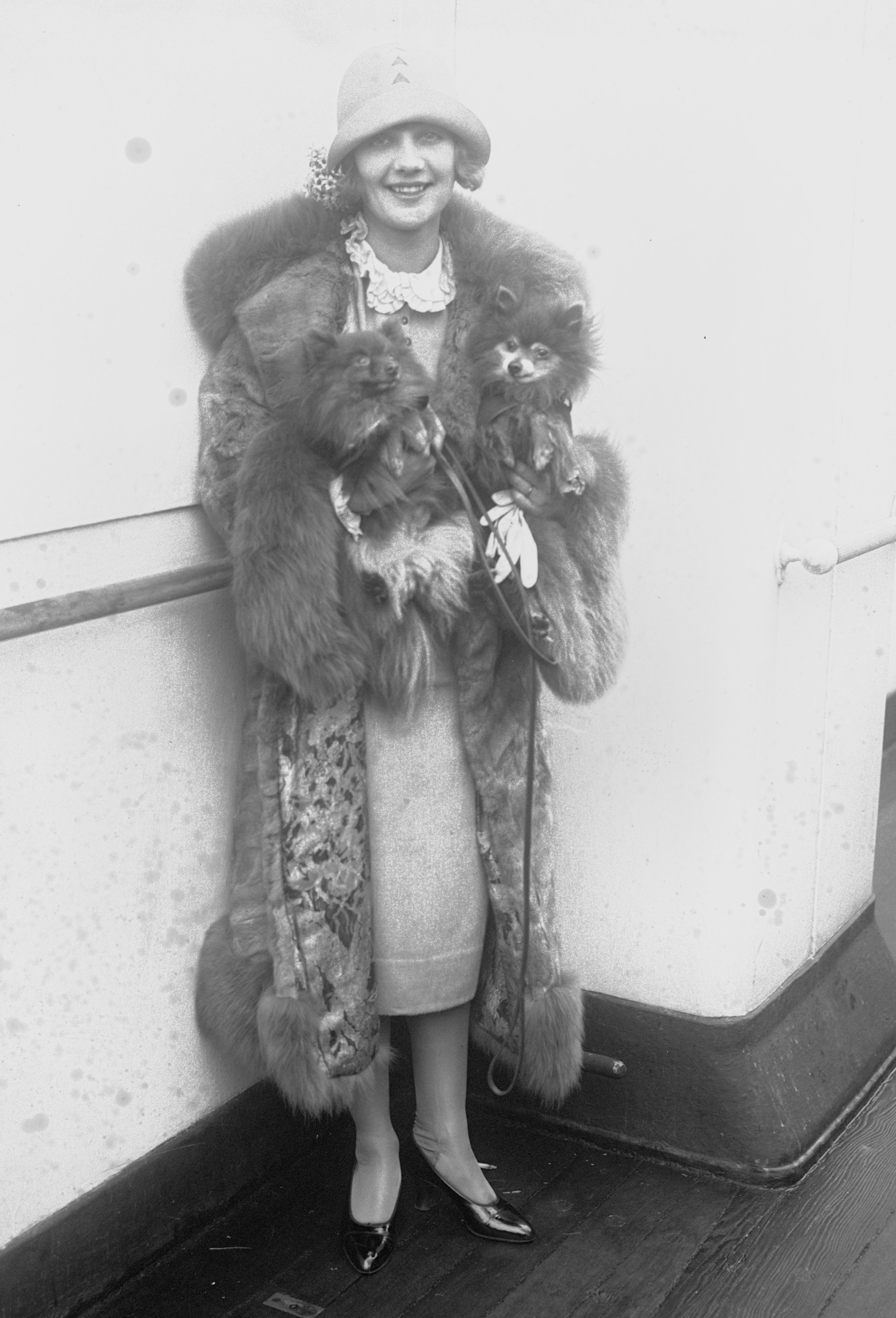
Queenie Thomas, from the Library of Congress

== Selected filmography ==
- Jessie (1914)
- Gentlemen (1915)
- Infelice (1915)
- The White Star (1915)
- Won by Losing (1916)
- The Chance of a Lifetime (1916)
- Frills (1916)
- A Man the Army Made (1917)
- Democracy (1918)
- Rock of Ages (1918)
- It's Happiness that Counts (1918)
- Meg o' the Woods (1918)
- What Would a Gentleman Do? (1918)
- A Little Child Shall Lead Them (1919)
- Trousers (1920)
- The School for Scandal (1923)
- Straws in the Wind (1924)
- Her Redemption (1924, also known as The Gayest of the Gay)
- The Alley of Golden Hearts (1924)
- The Gold Cure (1925)
- The Last Witness (1925)
- Safety First (1926)
- The Temple of Shadows (as Regina Thomas, 1927)
- Siren of the Tropics (as Regina Thomas, 1927)
- Warned Off (1930)
