= Lottie Blackford =

English actress

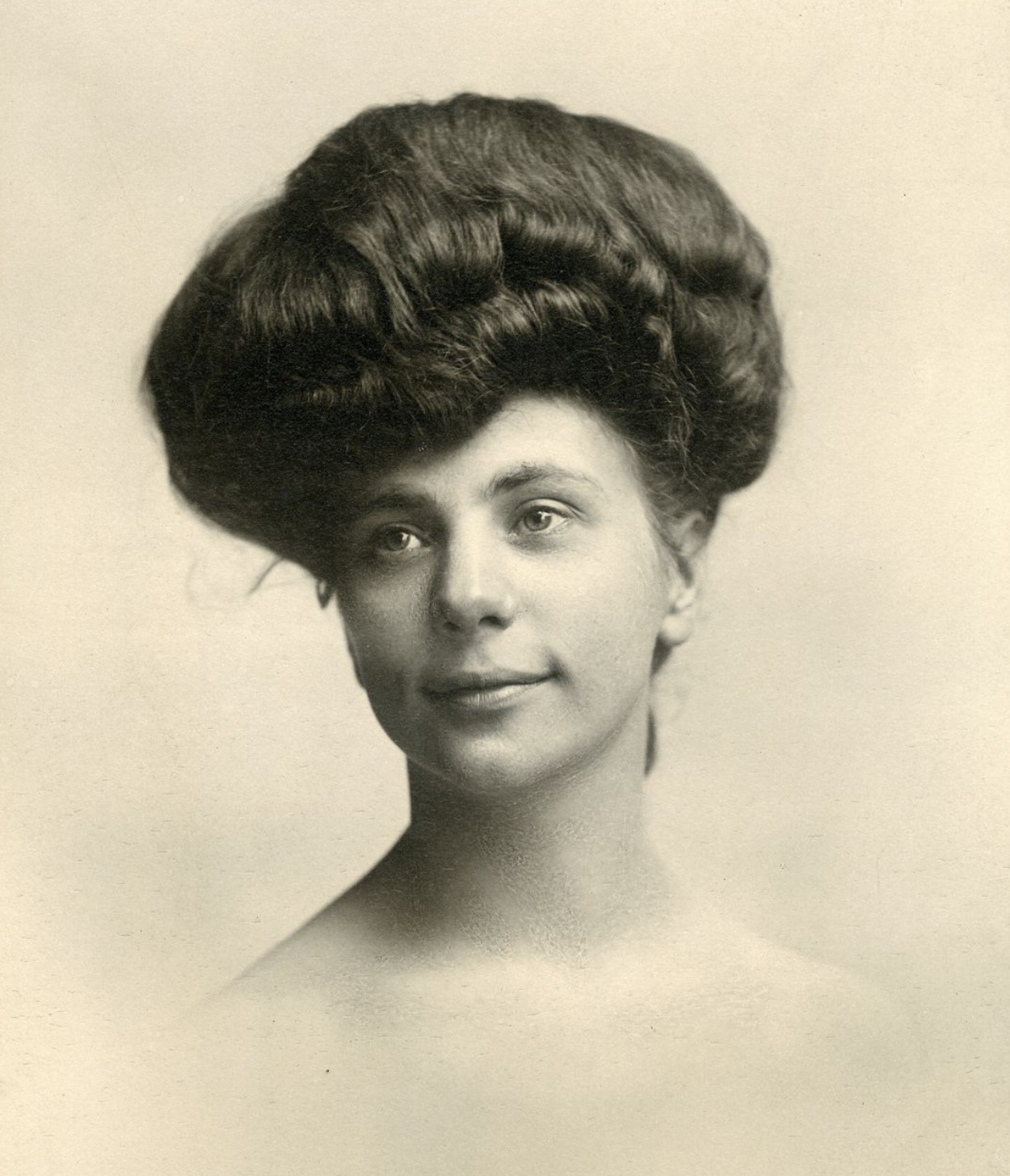
Lottie Blackford in 1905

Lottie Blackford (3 February 1881 – 30 December 1973) was an English actress of the silent era.

Marylebone, London and died in Los Angeles, California, aged 92.

She was also a theatre actress, sometimes of the burlesque genre.

== Partial filmography ==
- Rock of Ages (1918)
- The Homemaker (1919)
- The Knave of Hearts (1919)
- Tilly of Bloomsbury (1921)
- The School for Scandal (1923)
- The Dawn of Truth (1920)
- The Narrow Valley (1921)
