= A Wife's Romance =

1923 film

- Directed by: Thomas N. Heffron
- Written by: Frank S. Beresford; H.W. Roberts
- Produced by: Samuel Zierler
- Starring: Clara Kimball Young; Lewis Dayton; Alan Roscoe
- Cinematography: Charles Richardson
- Production company: Harry Garson Productions
- Distributed by: Metro Pictures
- Release date: September 19, 1923
- Running time: 60 minutes
- Country: United States
- Languages: Silent; English-language intertitles

A Wife's Romance is a 1923 American silent drama film directed by Thomas N. Heffron and starring Clara Kimball Young, Lewis Dayton and Alan Roscoe.

== Synopsis ==
A female artist, neglected by her diplomat husband, becomes involved with a Spaniard whose portrait she is painting.

== Cast ==
- Clara Kimball Young as Joyce Addison
- Lewis Dayton as John Addison
- Alan Roscoe as Ramón
- Lillian Adrian as Joseffa
- Wedgwood Nowell as Marquis de Castellar
- Robert Cauterio as Pablo
- Arthur Stuart Hull as Evan Denbigh
- Louise Bates Mortimer as Isabel de Castellar

== Bibliography ==
- Munden, Kenneth White. The American Film Institute Catalog of Motion Pictures Produced in the United States, Part 1. University of California Press, 1997.
