= Her Social Value =

1921 film

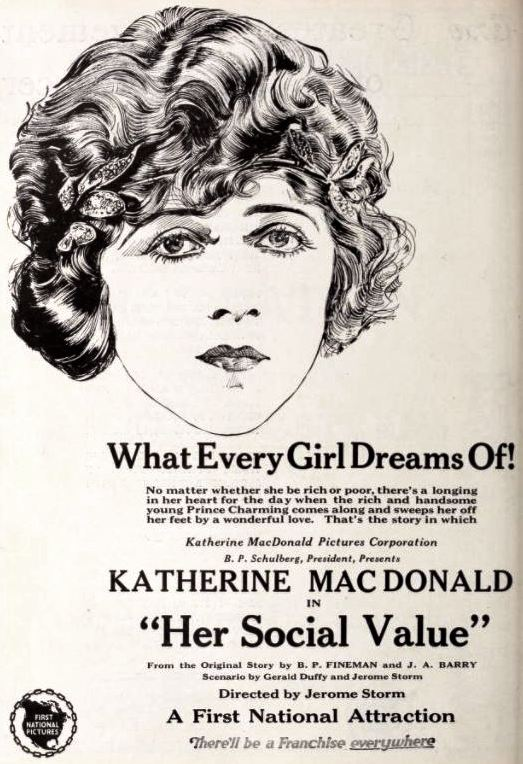
- Advertisement
- Directed by: Jerome Storm
- Screenplay by: Gerald Duffy; Jerome Storm
- Story by: B.P. Fineman; J.A. Barry
- Starring: Katherine MacDonald; Roy Stewart; Bertram Grassby; Betty Ross Clarke
- Cinematography: Joseph Brotherton
- Production company: Katherine MacDonald Pictures
- Distributed by: Associated First National Pictures
- Release date: October 24, 1921
- Running time: 60 minutes
- Country: United States
- Language: Silent (English intertitles)

Her Social Value is a 1921 American drama film directed by Jerome Storm and written by Gerald Duffy and Jerome Storm. The film stars Katherine MacDonald, Roy Stewart, Bertram Grassby, Betty Ross Clarke, Winter Hall, and Joseph W. Girard. The film was released on October 24, 1921, by Associated First National Pictures.

== Cast ==
- Katherine MacDonald as Marion Hoyte
- Roy Stewart as James Lodge
- Bertram Grassby as Clifford Trent
- Betty Ross Clarke as Bertha Harmon
- Winter Hall as Shipley
- Joseph W. Girard as Joe Harmon
- Lillian Rich as Gwendolyn Shipley
- Vincent Hamilton as Leroy Howard
- Helen Raymond as Ruth Lodge
- Violet Phillips as Belle
- Arthur Gibson as The Baby

== Preservation ==
This film is now lost.
