= Guy Fawkes (film) =

1923 film

- Directed by: Maurice Elvey
- Written by: Alicia Ramsey
- Starring: Matheson Lang; Nina Vanna; Hugh Buckler; Shayle Gardner
- Production company: Stoll Pictures
- Distributed by: Stoll Pictures
- Release date: 1923
- Running time: 55 minutes
- Country: United Kingdom
- Language: English

Guy Fawkes is a 1923 British silent historical film directed by Maurice Elvey and starring Matheson Lang, Nina Vanna and Hugh Buckler. The film depicts the Gunpowder Plot of 1605 in which a group of plotters planned to blow up the Houses of Parliament. It was based on the 1840 novel Guy Fawkes by William Harrison Ainsworth.

== Cast ==
- Matheson Lang - Guy Fawkes
- Nina Vanna - Viviana Ratcliffe
- Hugh Buckler - Robert Catesby
- Shayle Gardner - Humphrey
- Lionel d'Aragon - Earl of Salisbury
- Edward O'Neill - Father
- Jerrold Robertshaw - James I of England
- Robert English - Radcliffe
- Dallas Cairns - Mounteagle
- Pino Conti - Tresham
