= A Woman Misunderstood =

1921 British film

- Directed by: Fred Paul; Jack Raymond
- Written by: Norman Ramsay
- Production company: Screen Plays
- Distributed by: British Exhibitors' Films
- Release date: September 1921
- Country: United Kingdom
- Languages: Silent; English intertitles

A Woman Misunderstood is a 1921 British silent short drama film directed by Jack Raymond and Fred Paul. It marked Raymond's directorial debut.

== Bibliography ==
- Gifford, Denis. The Illustrated Who's Who in British Films. B.T. Batsford, 1978.
