= The Man Without Desire =

1923 film directed by Adrian Brunel

- Ivor Novello screenshot
- Directed by: Adrian Brunel
- Written by: Adrian Brunel; Monckton Hoffe; Frank Powell
- Produced by: Ivor Novello; Miles Mander
- Starring: Ivor Novello; Nina Vanna
- Cinematography: Henry Harris
- Production company: Atlas Biocraft
- Distributed by: Atlas Biocraft
- Release date: 1923
- Running time: 7000 feet
- Country: United Kingdom

The Man Without Desire is a 1923 British silent film fantasy drama, directed by Adrian Brunel and starring Ivor Novello, who also co-produced the film along with Miles Mander. The film was Brunel's feature-length directorial debut and has been described as "one of the stranger films to emerge from Britain in the 1920s". The film's theme of loss of sexual desire, and by implication impotence, was exceptionally frank for its time; oddly, however, it appears to have been passed for release without interference by the British film censors, who at this time had a reputation for extreme zealousness where sexual matters in film were concerned.

== Production ==
Brunel's commission for the film was to write and produce a historical drama set in Venice. Feeling that this alone would not necessarily prove a draw for filmgoers, he came up with a story which had an 18th-century core but was framed by a contemporary narrative. The film was given a budget of £5,000, which, while not lavish, allowed for travel to Venice to shoot location scenes. Studio filming and post-production took place in Berlin, and film historians observe the influence on the finished product of the German expressionist cinema of the era, notably the celebrated The Cabinet of Dr. Caligari.

== Plot ==
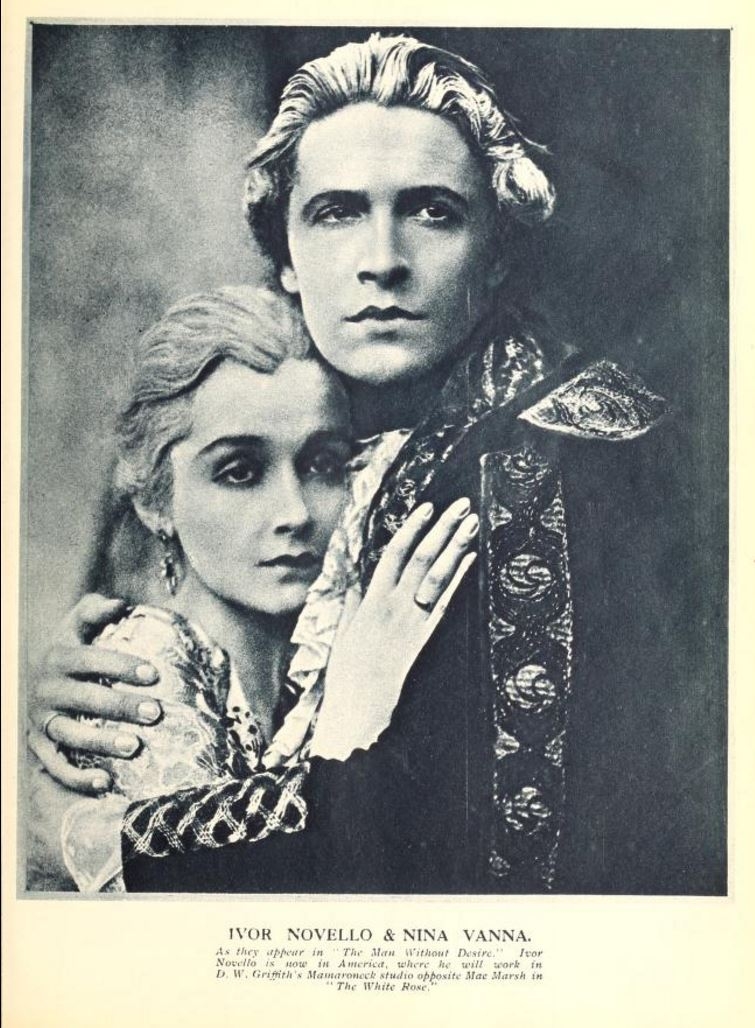
Vanna and Novello in a publicity shot for the film

18th-century Venetian Count Vittorio Dandolo (Novello) is devastated by the death of his lover Leonora (Nina Vanna) and loses all interest in life. Wishing to escape from his grief, he devises a method of putting himself in a state of suspended animation. He awakens 200 years later in 1920s Venice where he meets Genevia, Leonora's double, who turns out to be a descendant of his former love. Falling immediately in love with Genevia, he proposes marriage which Genevia accepts. He then discovers that his 200-year slumber has left him with the ability to love but unable to experience passion, and the marriage remains unconsummated.

== Cast ==
- Ivor Novello as Count Vittorio Dandolo
- Nina Vanna as Leonora / Genevia
- Sergio Mari as Almoro / Gordi
- Christopher Walker as Roger / Mawdesley
- Jane Dryden as Luigia
- Dorothy Warren as Foscolina
