= S.O.S. (1928 film) =

1928 film

- Directed by: Leslie S. Hiscott
- Written by: Walter Ellis (play)
- Produced by: Julius Hagen
- Starring: Robert Loraine; Bramwell Fletcher; Ursula Jeans; Lewis Dayton
- Production company: Strand Films
- Distributed by: Allied Artists
- Release date: December 1928
- Running time: 7,250 feet
- Country: United Kingdom
- Languages: Silent; English intertitles

S.O.S. is a 1928 British silent adventure film directed by Leslie S. Hiscott and starring Robert Loraine, Bramwell Fletcher and Ursula Jeans. The film takes its title from the morse code distress signal S.O.S. It was made at Lime Grove Studios.

The film marked director Hiscott's first move from comedy films, which he had begun his career making, into the straight dramatic films that would become best known for.

== Cast ==
- Robert Loraine as Owen Herriott
- Bramwell Fletcher as Herriott
- Ursula Jeans as Lady Weir
- Lewis Dayton as Sir Julian Weir
- Andrée Sacré as Judy Weir
- Campbell Gullan as Karensky
- Anita Sharp-Bolster as Mme. Karensky
- Viola Lyel as Effie

== Bibliography ==
- Low, Rachel. The History of British Film: Volume IV, 1918–1929. Routledge, 1997.
