= Housesitter =

1992 film by Frank Oz

- Theatrical release poster
- Directed by: Frank Oz
- Screenplay by: Mark Stein
- Story by: Mark Stein; Brian Grazer
- Produced by: Brian Grazer
- Starring: Steve Martin; Goldie Hawn; Dana Delany; Julie Harris; Donald Moffat; Peter MacNicol
- Cinematography: John A. Alonzo
- Edited by: John Jympson
- Music by: Miles Goodman
- Production company: Imagine Films Entertainment
- Distributed by: Universal Pictures
- Release date: June 12, 1992
- Running time: 101 minutes
- Country: United States
- Language: English
- Budget: $26 million
- Box office: $94.9 million

Housesitter is a 1992 American romantic comedy film directed by Frank Oz, written by Mark Stein, and starring Steve Martin and Goldie Hawn. The premise involves a woman with con-artist tendencies who worms her way into the life of a reserved architect by claiming to be his wife.

Housesitter was released by Universal Pictures on June 12, 1992. The film received mixed to negative reviews from critics and grossed $94.9 million against a $26 million budget.

== Plot ==
Newton Davis is a struggling architect. After building his dream house for himself and his longtime girlfriend Becky in his hometown of Dobb's Mill, Massachusetts, he is devastated when she refuses to marry him. Unable to bring himself to live in the house, he leaves it abandoned and with a debt he cannot afford. Three months later, Newton meets a waitress named Gwen at the Café Budapest, a Hungarian restaurant in Boston. Believing that she cannot speak English, he vents to her about Becky and the abandoned house. After the restaurant closes for the night, Newton learns she merely pretended to be Hungarian, and can speak English. He walks her home, which turns out to be a small apartment above the restaurant. They end up having sex.

The next morning, Gwen finds that Newton left in the middle of the night, inadvertently leaving behind his doodle of the house he had built for Becky. Intrigued by the doodle, Gwen takes a bus to Dobb's Mill and eventually moves into the empty house. She goes to the town's general store and charges her groceries to Newton's account, claiming to be his wife. Gwen meets Becky, fabricating an elaborate tale about how she and Newton met and fell in love, and lying that he has been recently promoted, which surprises and impresses Becky. Gwen also meets Newton's parents, who are heartbroken that he "got married" without telling them, but she smooths things over with them using her charm.

Determined to sell the house, Newton drives to Dobb's Mill and is shocked to find Gwen squatting in the house, which is now fully furnished. She claims that she had to flee her apartment because her landlord and boss at the Café Budapest tried to sexually abuse her. Newton is initially furious after discovering that Gwen has been telling people that they are married, until Becky stops by to congratulate him on his promotion and marriage. Newton and Gwen come to an agreement in which she will help him win Becky back. In addition to making Becky jealous, Gwen's lies start creating opportunities for Newton, such as mending his relationship with his parents and helping out with his career by befriending Newton's boss and highlighting his long-ignored talent.

Newton's parents suggest a wedding reception at the new house; Newton is hesitant, while Gwen gladly agrees. One day, Newton and Becky kiss while at her house, but she stops him, as she refuses to be a mistress. Soon afterward, Newton learns from a waitress at the Café Budapest that, in addition to lying about being harassed by her boss, Gwen grew up in a foster home and was married to a man when she was 16. Confronted by Newton, Gwen explains that she came to Dobb's Mill to experience the picture-perfect life she never had before. She tries to leave, but Newton convinces her to stay through the reception.

On the day of the reception, when Becky is telling old stories about Newton, Gwen accuses her of being in love with him, before storming out of the house in tears. Newton's boss gives him the promotion, crediting Gwen for showing him the house. Outside, Newton praises Gwen for her performance, but she is truly upset and declares that she wanted their "marriage" to work. Newton is confused as Gwen leaves. Becky takes the opportunity to make a move on Newton, and asks whether all of Gwen's elaborate stories were real. Newton asserts that they were all true and chases after Gwen.

Newton stops Gwen as she is about to board a bus to leave town, asking her to marry him. When she resists, Newton makes up an outlandish romantic story about how he once had himself delivered to her in a box as a birthday present. Moved, Gwen jumps into his arms. Some time later, Newton and Gwen are happily married and living together in the house. When Newton professes his love for Gwen, she confesses that her name is actually Jessica.

== Cast ==
- Steve Martin as Newton Davis
- Goldie Hawn as Gwen Duncle/Buckley/Phillips
- Dana Delany as Becky Metcalf
- Julie Harris as Edna Davis
- Donald Moffat as George Davis
- Peter MacNicol as Marty
- Richard B. Shull as Ralph / Bernie Duncle
- Laurel Cronin as Mary / Mary Duncle
- Roy Cooper as Winston Moseby
- Christopher Durang as Reverend Lipton

== Production ==
The role of Gwen Phillips was initially offered to Meg Ryan, who pulled out due to creative differences.

Principal photography took place from August to October 1991 in Massachusetts, with filming locations including Boston, Concord, Carlisle, and Cohasset.

The Concord, Massachusetts house featured in the film was originally designed by New York architects Trumbull & Associates. The 1,800-square-foot (170 m^{2}), three-bedroom property previously won the House Beautiful/American Wood Council Award for Best Small House of 1990.

== Release and reception ==
On the review aggregator website Rotten Tomatoes, 36% of 22 critics' reviews are positive, with an average rating of 5.0/10. Metacritic, which uses a weighted average, assigned the film a score of 52 out of 100, based on 24 reviews, indicating "mixed or average" reviews.

Film critic Roger Ebert gave it three stars, writing "this is one of [Goldie Hawn's] best performances" and praised her and Steve Martin's impeccable comic timing. Vincent Canby of The New York Times opined that the film is "a cardboard vehicle in which Steve Martin and Goldie Hawn ride up front, doing what each does with great talent and occasional vigor, and a lot of very able character actors sit in the back, kibitzing and adding local color." Gene Siskel of the Chicago Tribune wrote that the film was "a one-note comedy with screwball aspirations [that] is amusing while it sets up its premise [and then] attempts to recycle the premise into a story." Kenneth Turan of the Los Angeles Times called the film "an occasionally amusing screwball farce made by people whose screws are barely loose at all."

The film was released theatrically in the United States on June 12, 1992, after being moved back from an initial May 8 release date. It earned $9.1 million on its opening weekend and $58.5 million for its entire domestic theatrical run, grossing a total of $94.9 million worldwide.

=== Home media ===
The film was released on VHS on December 2, 1992, by MCA/Universal Home Video. It proved successful in the video rental market, becoming the 11th most-rented film in the United States for 1993. It was released on DVD on July 22, 1998, and eventually on Blu-ray on April 16, 2019.
