= Ernest A. Douglas =

British actor

- Occupation: Actor

Ernest A. Douglas was a British actor of the silent era.

== Selected filmography ==
- Rock of Ages (1918)
- Linked by Fate (1919)
- Darby and Joan (1920)
- The Call of the Road (1920)
- Ernest Maltravers (1920)
- Dangerous Lies (1921)
- The Persistent Lovers (1922)
- Out to Win (1923)
- The Loves of Mary, Queen of Scots (1923)
- Hurricane Hutch in Many Adventures (1924)
