= The Alley of Golden Hearts =

1924 British silent film by Bertram Phillips

- Directed by: Bertram Phillips
- Written by: E.P. Kinsella; Frank Miller
- Produced by: Bertram Phillips
- Starring: Queenie Thomas; John Stuart; Frank Stanmore
- Production company: BP Productions
- Distributed by: MP Sales
- Release date: July 1924
- Country: United Kingdom
- Languages: Silent; English intertitles

The Alley of Golden Hearts is a 1924 British silent drama film directed by Bertram Phillips and starring Queenie Thomas, John Stuart and Frank Stanmore.

== Cast ==
- Queenie Thomas as Charity
- John Stuart as Jack
- Frank Stanmore as Grocer
- Mary Brough
- Bernard Vaughan
- Adeline Hayden Coffin
- Judd Green
- Polly Emery
- Cecil Morton York as Sir James / Paul

== Bibliography ==
- Low, Rachael. History of the British Film, 1918-1929. George Allen & Unwin, 1971.
