= Infelice (film) =

1915 film directed by L.C. MacBean

Infelice is a silent film directed by L.C. MacBean e Fred Paul and released in the UK on 30 September 1915. The script is based on a novel by Augusta J. Evans-Wilson.

== Plot ==
A general forces his married son to leave his wife for an heiress but he returns to her when she acts in the play of her life.

== Production ==
The film was produced by the British company G.B. Samuelson Productions.

== Cast ==
- Peggy Hyland as Minnie Perle
- Fred Paul as Peleg Peterson
- Bertram Burleigh as Cuthbert Lawrence
- Queenie Thomas as Regina
- Richard Vaughan as General Lawrence

== Reception ==
Infelice was a financial success for G.B. Samuelson Productions. It was shown in 681 cinemas
