= The School for Scandal (1923 film) =

1923 film

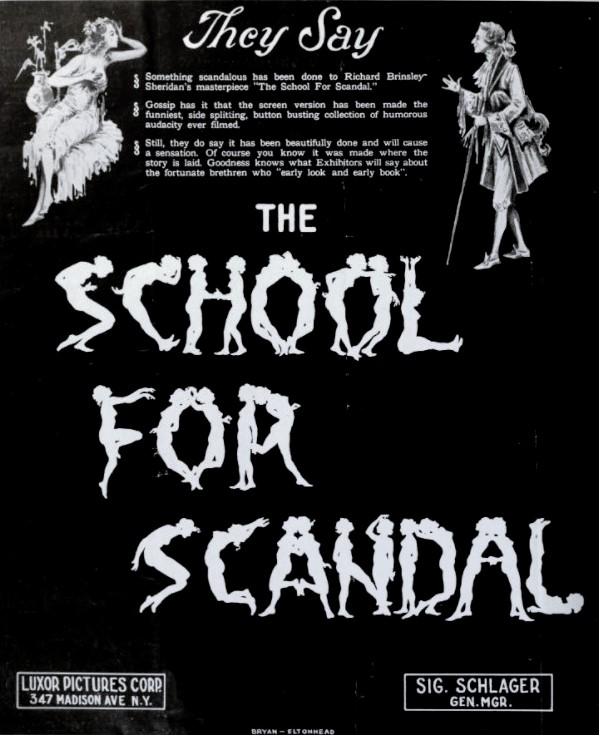
- American advertisement
- Directed by: Bertram Phillips
- Written by: Frank Miller
- Based on: The School for Scandal by Richard Sheridan
- Produced by: Bertram Phillips
- Starring: Queenie Thomas; Frank Stanmore; Basil Rathbone
- Production company: BP Productions
- Distributed by: Butcher's Film Service
- Release date: 1923
- Running time: 6 reels
- Country: United Kingdom
- Language: Silent (English intertitles)

The School for Scandal is a 1923 British silent comedy film directed by Bertram Phillips and starring Queenie Thomas, Frank Stanmore, and Basil Rathbone. It is an adaptation of the play The School for Scandal by Richard Brinsley Sheridan.

== Cast ==
- Queenie Thomas as Lady Teazle
- Frank Stanmore as Sir Peter Teazle
- Basil Rathbone as Joseph Surface
- John Stuart as Charles Surface
- Sidney Paxton as Sir Oliver Surface
- A.G. Poulton as Moses
- Elsie French as Lady Sneerwell
- Mary Brough as Mrs. Candour
- Jack Miller as Trip
- Billie Shotter as Maria
- Lottie Blackford as Aunt Agatha
- James Reardon as Crabtree
- Wallace Bosco as Snake
- Kimber Philips as Sir Harry Bumper
- Richard Turner as Sir Benjamin
