= The Money Habit =

1924 film

- Directed by: Walter Niebuhr
- Written by: Paul M. Potter (novel); Alice Ramsey
- Starring: Clive Brook; Annette Benson; Nina Vanna
- Cinematography: Baron Ventimiglia
- Production company: Commonwealth Films
- Distributed by: Granger Films
- Release date: January 1924
- Country: United Kingdom
- Languages: Silent; English intertitles

The Money Habit is a 1924 British silent crime film directed by Walter Niebuhr and starring Clive Brook, Annette Benson and Nina Vanna. It was based on a novel by Paul M. Potter. The screenplay concerns a man whose mistress helps him con a financier into buying a worthless oil well.

== Cast ==
- Clive Brook as Noel Jason
- Annette Benson as Diana Hastings
- Nina Vanna as Cecile d'Arcy
- Warwick Ward as Varian
- Fred Rains as Marley
- Eva Westlake as Duchess
- Philip Hewland as Mr. Hastings
- Muriel Gregory as Typist
- Kate Gurney as Mrs. Hastings

== Bibliography ==
- Low, Rachael. History of the British Film, 1918-1929. George Allen & Unwin, 1971.
