= Her Redemption =

1924 film

- Directed by: Bertram Phillips
- Written by: Frank Miller; Arthur Shirley (play)
- Produced by: Bertram Phillips
- Starring: Queenie Thomas; John Stuart; Cecil Humphreys
- Production company: BP Productions
- Distributed by: MP Sales
- Release date: August 1924
- Country: United Kingdom
- Languages: Silent; English intertitles

Her Redemption is a 1924 British silent crime film directed by Bertram Phillips and starring Queenie Thomas, John Stuart and Cecil Humphreys.

== Cast ==
- Queenie Thomas as Olivia / Sylvia Meredith
- John Stuart as Jack Latimer
- Cecil Humphreys as Hubert Steele
- Juliette Compton as Liana Vandry
- Frank Stanmore as Barney
- Arthur Cleave as Percy
- Wyndham Guise as Seth Howard

== Bibliography ==
- Goble, Alan. The Complete Index to Literary Sources in Film. Walter de Gruyter, 1999.
