= Betty Ross Clarke =

American actress (1892–1970)

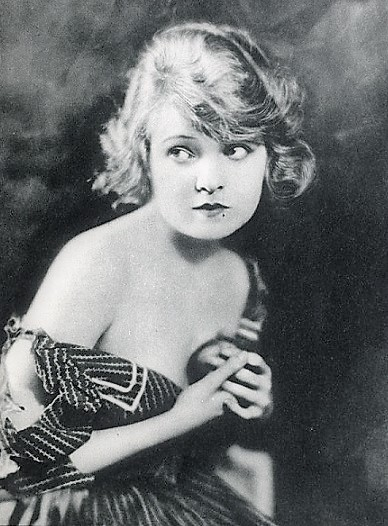
- Clarke, 1920
- Born: May Clarke; May 1, 1892; Langdon, North Dakota, United States
- Died: January 24, 1970 (aged 77); Los Angeles, California, US
- Other names: Betsy Ross Clarke, Betty Ross Clark, Betty Ross-Clarke, Betty Clarke Collins, May Clarke Collins, Betty Clarke
- Occupation: Actress
- Years active: 1920–1940
- Spouse: Arthur Greville Collins (1921-?)

Betty Ross Clarke (born May Clarke, May 1, 1892 – January 24, 1970) (Note: Although some sources give Clarke's birth and death years as 1896 and 1947, respectively, publicly available United States government documents, referenced below, support the birth and death dates given here.) was an American stage and film actress. She appeared in more than 30 films between 1920 and 1940, including silent and sound films, in both credited and uncredited roles.

== Personal life ==
Clarke was born in Langdon, North Dakota, the daughter of Charles Willard Clarke and Cora Ross. Her maternal grandfather was Leonard F. Ross, a brigadier general in the American Civil War, and her maternal great-grandfather was Ossian M. Ross, a prominent pioneer settler in Illinois who founded the cities of Lewistown, Illinois and Havana, Illinois.

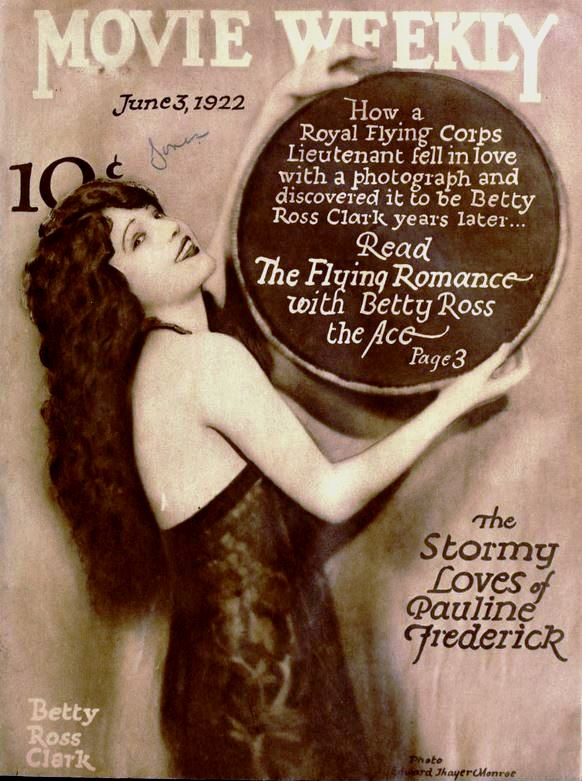
Magazine cover featuring Clarke (misspelled "Clark"), 1922

At the age of three, May Clarke moved with her family to Minneapolis, Minnesota, where she was educated in the local schools and at the Stanley Hall School. She then studied dancing in New York City and spent a year on the vaudeville circuit. She had intended to pursue a career as a ballet dancer, but she eventually had such success as a stage and film actress that she gave up the idea of dancing as a profession.

On May 28, 1921, Betty Ross Clarke married Arthur Collins, a Los Angeles banker and former lieutenant in the British Royal Flying Corps. The couple had met at a dinner party during the filming of Mother o' Mine. In 1923, Clarke and her husband moved to England, where she became a citizen and where she continued her career as a stage and film actress. In 1926, the couple moved to Australia, where Clarke was engaged to perform in several plays.

Arthur Collins and Betty Ross Clarke returned to the United States in July 1929, apparently lured back to Hollywood by the "talkies." She resumed her film career, primarily performing as a supporting or character actress, but also appearing in several uncredited roles. Her banker husband, who had been adversely affected by the stock market crash of 1929, began producing plays, directing films, and acting as a dialog director.

In 1930, Betty Ross Clarke was honored as an "ardent feminist" at a luncheon of the San Francisco Center of the League of Women Voters. She was lauded for her support of voting rights for women even though she herself could not vote in the United States because she did not have her citizenship papers. She finally became a naturalized U.S. citizen on December 28, 1934. By that time, Betty Ross Clarke and Arthur Collins were divorced.

Betty Ross Clarke died in Los Angeles, California on January 24, 1970. (Note: The date of birth given on the social security death record for "Betty Clarke" matches the date of birth given on a petition for citizenship that was signed by "May Clarke Collins." The petitioner's occupation was listed as "actress," the form stated that she was divorced from Arthur Collins, and it further stated that she entered the United States under the name Betty Ross Clarke. Therefore, it seems highly likely that the social security death record for Betty Clarke is, in fact, the record for Betty Ross Clarke, actress. Moreover, the death information on the social security form agrees with death information provided by a grand-niece of Betty Ross Clarke.) She was interred in Forest Lawn Memorial Park in Glendale, California.

== Stage career ==
Clarke made her first appearance on the stage in a stock company in Halifax, Nova Scotia. Her later stock engagements included performances in Pittsburgh; Haverhill, Massachusetts; and Sioux City, Iowa. In 1916, she starred in the hit play Fair and Warmer. She made her Broadway debut on September 19, 1917, at the Comedy Theatre in the play The Family Exit, in the role of Evelyn de Gascoigne. She appeared in the play True to Form at the Bramhall Playhouse in September 1921, and performed the role of Liane in The Red Poppy in Greenwich Village in December 1922.

After moving to England with her husband in 1923, Clarke made her London stage debut on June 2, 1924, at the Royalty Theatre, in the role of Fifi Morgan in the play Bachelor Husbands. Other plays in which she appeared included: No Man's Land (December 1924 at the St. Martin's, in the role of Augusta); The Monkey Talks (September 1925 at the Little Theatre, in the role of Dora Lavender); and The House of Glass (January 1926 at the Prince of Wales Theatre, in the role of Margaret Case). In 1926, Clarke was engaged to appear in theaters in Australia, where she performed in the plays The Ghost Train, Storm, Baby Cyclone, Rain, The Bride, and Tarnished.

After returning to the United States in 1929, Clarke continued to perform on the stage while also appearing in sound films. She played a leading role in the play Death Takes a Holiday, which was directed by her husband. After her final film in 1940, she continued to perform occasionally in local theatrical productions.

== Film career ==
During the 1920s, Clarke appeared in 14 silent films, including 11 U.S. films, two British films and one German film. In the United States, she worked for film companies that included Famous Players–Lasky, Thomas H. Ince, and Vitagraph Studios. She played the female lead in the film If I Were King opposite William Farnum and had other starring roles in silent films.

Clarke's first screen role in a "talkie" was as the character Dot Aldrich in The Age for Love. During the 1930s, she appeared in more than 20 sound films, including both feature films and short films. She typically played character roles, both credited and uncredited. Of note, she replaced the actress Sara Haden as Aunt Millie in two feature length Andy Hardy films. Betty Ross Clarke occasionally was billed in screen credits as Betsy Ross Clarke or Betty Ross Clark, and her name appears as Betty Ross-Clarke in some databases.

Throughout her career, Clarke often performed on both the theater stage and in films during the same time period. A newspaper advertisement in 1922 noted that audience members could "see her on stage and screen at the same time," because she was performing in the play The Morning Him and also starring in the film At the Sign of the Jack O'Lantern. Commenting on the difference between stage and film acting, Clarke remarked that the "silent drama affords an easier life to those who choose it, for one has the nights free, to do as one likes. On the boards an actor's or actresses's time is always taken up."

Most of the silent films in which Clarke was cast have not survived. However, at least two of her films, If I Were King and Mother o' Mine, are preserved in the silent film archive of the Library of Congress. Another print of Mother o' Mine is housed in the UCLA Film and Television Archive, and a full copy of the silent film The Traveling Salesman, with Roscoe "Fatty" Arbuckle in the leading role, is in the George Eastman House Motion Picture Collection in Rochester, New York. Many of the later sound films in which Clarke appears are available, including Murders in the Rue Morgue, A Bride for Henry, Love Finds Andy Hardy, Judge Hardy's Children, and Four Wives.

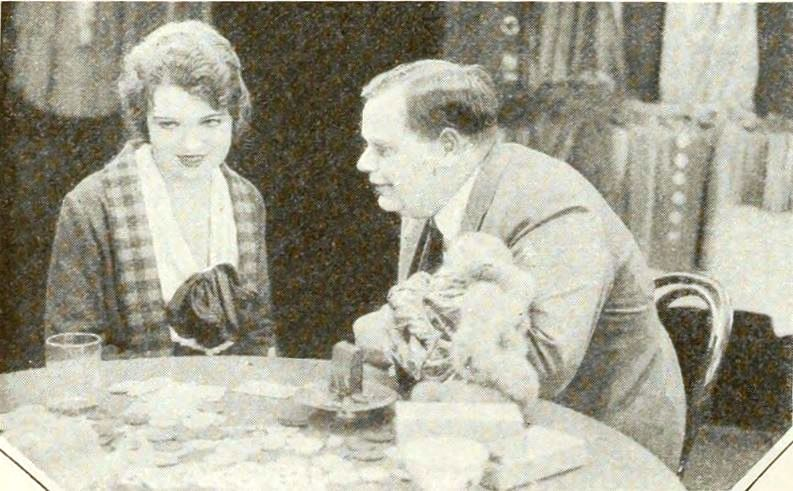
Still showing Clarke with Fatty Arbuckle in The Traveling Salesman (1921)

== Miscellany ==
Early in her film career, while she was living with her mother in Hollywood, Betty Ross Clarke was accused of shoplifting from Bullock's department store in Los Angeles. She was detained by the store but was released after she was recognized by store personnel. She initiated a lawsuit against the store, requesting $50,000 in damages, alleging that she had suffered illness as a result of the incident, and that her social standing, her credit, and her business reputation were impacted negatively. The outcome of the lawsuit is uncertain.

Clarke's recreational activities during the 1920s included athletics, reading, and writing. She also liked to drive her Paige Daytona automobile and to take photographs during her travels.

After purchasing a new house in California in 1921, following the filming of Brewster's Millions, she furnished the house with old furniture that she repainted herself. She took great delight in describing to newspaper readers how she carried out the furniture painting.

Owing to her prominence as a silent film actress, Clarke was one of a number of starlets (50) who were featured on cards given away by the Hignett cigarette company of England in their CHESS cigarette packets. She was number 29 in the set. Collectible cards from Hignett and other companies, featuring photos of Betty Ross Clarke from the silent film age, often appear for sale on eBay.

Clarke was one of 242 bohemians who signed The Greenwich Village Bookshop Door between the years 1921 and 1925. The bookshop door with the preserved signatures is housed in the Harry Ransom Center at the University of Texas at Austin.

== Filmography ==
Film	Year released	Role
Untamed	1940	Mother (uncredited)
Four Wives	1939	Nurse in Dr. Forrest's office (uncredited)
I'll Tell the World (short film)	1939	Mrs. Burton
Loews Christmas Greeting (The Hardy Family) (short film)	1939	Aunt Millie Forrest
Judge Hardy's Children	1938	Aunt Millie Forrest
Love Finds Andy Hardy	1938	Aunt Millie Forrest
Sweethearts	1938	Woman in lobby (uncredited)
Too Hot to Handle	1938	Mrs. Ruth Harding
Hold That Kiss	1938	Wedding guest at Piermont's (uncredited)
Paradise for Three	1938	Telephone operator (uncredited)
Woman Against Woman	1938	Alice
The Chaser	1938	Secretary (uncredited)
A Night at the Movies (short film)	1937	The wife
A Bride for Henry	1937	Mrs. Curtis
Blossoms on Broadway	1937	Mrs. Peagram
Give Till It Hurts (short film)	1937	Second nurse (uncredited)
Killer-Dog (short film)	1936	Mother (uncredited)
The Public Pays (short film)	1936	Paige's secretary (uncredited)
Three Married Men	1936	Annie
Headline Shooter	1933	Sue (Mike's wife) (uncredited)
Murders in the Rue Morgue	1932	Mme. L'Esponage, the mother
The Age for Love	1931	Dot Aldrich
Straws in the Wind (British)	1924	The wife
The Cost of Beauty (British)	1924	Diana Faire
Around a Million (German)	1924	–
At the Sign of the Jack O'Lantern	1922	Mrs. Carr
The Man from Downing Street	1922	Doris Burnham
The Fox	1921	Annette Fraser
Mother o' Mine	1921	Dolly Wilson
Her Social Value	1921	Bertha Harmon
Traveling Salesman	1921	Beth Elliott
Brewster's Millions	1921	Peggy
Lucky Carson	1921	Doris Bancroft
If I Were King	1920	Katherine de Vaucelles
Romance	1920	Susan Van Tuyl
The Very Idea	1920	Norah
