= Sally Bishop (1924 film) =

1916 film by Lloyd Ingraham

- Directed by: Maurice Elvey
- Written by: E. Temple Thurston (novel)
- Starring: Marie Doro; Henry Ainley
- Distributed by: Stoll Picture Productions
- Release date: 25 February 1924
- Country: United Kingdom
- Languages: Silent film English intertitles

Sally Bishop is a 1924 British silent romance film directed by Maurice Elvey and starring Marie Doro, Henry Ainley and Florence Turner. It is an adaptation of the novel Sally Bishop, a Romance by E. Temple Thurston.

== Cast ==
- Marie Doro - Sally Bishop
- Henry Ainley - John Traill
- Florence Turner - Janet
- Sydney Fairbrother - Landlady
- Valia - Miss Standish Rowe
- A. Bromley Davenport - Landlord
- Mary Dibley - Miss Priestly
- May Hanbury - Mrs Durlacher
- Stella St. Audrie - Mrs Bishop
- Humberston Wright - Judge
- Dallas Cairns - Mr Durlacher
- George Turner - Arthur
