= The Chance of a Lifetime (1916 film) =

1916 British film by Bertram Phillips

The Chance of a Lifetime is a 1916 British silent sports drama film directed by Bertram Phillips and starring Queenie Thomas, Austin Camp and Fay Temple. It was based on a novel of the same title by Nat Gould.

== Cast ==
- Queenie Thomas as Mrs. Edgar
- Austin Camp as Dick Douglas
- Fay Temple as Diana Lawson
- Harry Agar Lyons as Captain Clinch
- Frank Petley
- Rohan Clensy
- Ernest Collins
- Will Asher
