= The Cost of Beauty =

1924 British film by Walter Summers

- Directed by: Walter Summers
- Written by: Walter Summers
- Produced by: G.B. Samuelson
- Starring: Betty Ross Clarke; Lewis Dayton; James Lindsay
- Production company: Napoleon Films
- Distributed by: Napoleon Films
- Release date: July 1924
- Country: United Kingdom
- Languages: Silent; English intertitles

The Cost of Beauty is a 1924 British silent romance film directed by Walter Summers and starring Betty Ross Clarke, Lewis Dayton and James Lindsay. It was made at Isleworth Studios.

== Cast ==
- Betty Ross Clarke as Diana Faire
- Lewis Dayton as Garth Walters
- James Lindsay as Henri Delatour
- Tom Reynolds
- Patrick Aherne
- Nina Vanna

== Bibliography ==
- Harris, Ed. Britain's Forgotten Film Factory: The Story of Isleworth Studios. Amberley Publishing, 2013.
