= A Night at the Movies (film) =

- Directed by: Roy Rowland
- Written by: Robert Benchley; Robert Lees; Frederic I. Rinaldo
- Produced by: Jack Chertok
- Starring: Robert Benchley; King Baggot; Jack Baxley
- Narrated by: Robert Benchley
- Distributed by: Metro-Goldwyn-Mayer
- Release date: November 6, 1937
- Running time: 10 minutes
- Country: United States
- Language: English

A Night at the Movies is a 1937 American short film starring Robert Benchley. It was Benchley's greatest success since How to Sleep, and won him a contract for more short films that would be produced in New York.

The film was nominated for an Academy Award at the 10th Academy Awards, held in 1937, for Best Short Subject (One-Reel).

== Cast ==
- Robert Benchley as husband
- King Baggot as movie patron (uncredited)
- Jack Baxley as movie patron (uncredited)
- Sidney Bracey as Movie Patron (uncredited)
- Francis X. Bushman Jr. as ticket taker (uncredited)
- Ricardo Lord Cezon as child who stares (uncredited)
- Betty Ross Clarke as wife (uncredited)
- Hal K. Dawson as Mr. Pennelly (uncredited)
- Flora Finch as Movie Patron (uncredited)
- Priscilla Lawson as usherette (uncredited)
- Gwen Lee as cashier (uncredited)
- Jack 'Tiny' Lipson as movie patron (uncredited)
- Claire McDowell as movie patron (uncredited)
- Artie Ortego as movie patron (uncredited)
- Frank Sheridan as Mr. Baum (uncredited)
