= Lewis Dayton =

British actor (1888–1963)

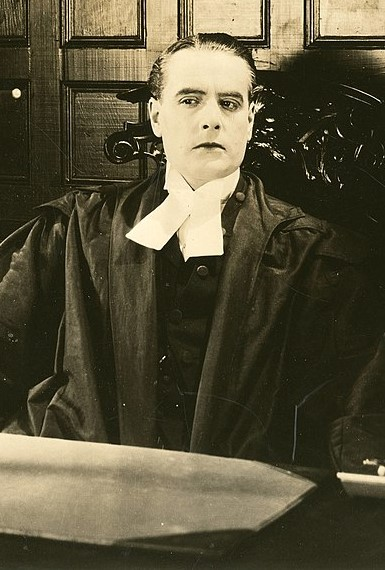
- Dayton in 1923
- Born: Henry Wallenstein Ryan Lewis; 3 February 1888; Brighton, East Sussex, England
- Died: January 1963 (aged 74); U.S.
- Occupation: Actor
- Years active: 1918–1932

Lewis Dayton (born Henry Wallenstein Ryan Lewis; 3 February 1888 – January 1963) was a British actor who appeared in a number of films during the silent and early sound eras, largely in supporting roles but occasionally in the male lead.

== Selected filmography ==
- A Daughter of Uncle Sam (1918)
- The Shadow Between (1920)
- A Rank Outsider (1920)
- The Great Day (1921)
- The Marriage Lines (1921)
- The Mystery of Mr. Bernard Brown (1921)
- The Lilac Sunbonnet (1922)
- Yesterday's Wife (1923)
- Slander the Woman (1923)
- A Wife's Romance (1923)
- Cordelia the Magnificent (1923)
- The Cost of Beauty (1924)
- Around a Million (1924)
- What Fools Men (1925)
- Spangles (1928)
- S.O.S. (1928)
- The Celestial City (1929)
- The Runaway Princess (1929)
- Detective Lloyd (1931), a serial
- Lloyd of the C.I.D. (1932)
- The Strangler (1932)

== Bibliography ==
- Low, Rachael. History of the British Film, 1918-1929. George Allen & Unwin, 1971.
