= Frank McClellan =

American football coach (1940–2020)

Biographical details
- Born: November 17, 1940; Sallis, Mississippi, U.S.
- Died: April 18, 2020; Marvell, Arkansas, U.S.
- Education: Delta State College

Playing career
- 1959–1960: Holmes
- 1961–1963: Delta State

Coaching career (HC unless noted)

Football
- 1965–1966: West Tallahatchie HS (MS) (line)
- 1967–1968: Vaiden HS (MS)
- 1969: McAdams HS (MS)
- 1970–1979: Barton HS (AR)
- 1980: Durant HS (MS)
- 1981–2005: Barton HS (AR)

Track and field
- 1969: McAdams HS (MS)

Head coaching record
- Overall: 370–65–4

Accomplishments and honors

Championships
- 8 Arkansas state championships (1978, 1986-1989, 1993, 1994, 1997); 23 conference championships (1973, 1977, 1978, 1981-1983, 1985-1997, 1999-2001, 2003)

James Franklin McClellan (November 17, 1940 – April 18, 2020) was an American high school football coach. He was the head football coach for Vaiden High School from 1967 to 1968, McAdams High School in 1969, Barton High School from 1970 to 1979 and from 1981 to 2005, and Durant High School in 1980. He is the all-time winningest coach in Arkansas high school football history with a total of 349 wins. He also coached for West Tallahatchie High School. He played college football for Holmes and Delta State.

== Head coaching record ==
Year	Team	Overall	Conference	Standing	Bowl/playoffs
Vaiden Bulldogs () (1967–1968)
1967	Vaiden	4–6			
1968	Vaiden	4–6			
Vaiden:		8–12			
McAdams Bulldogs () (1969)
1969	McAdams	7–2–1			
McAdams:		7–2–1			
Barton Bears () (1970–1979)
1970	Barton	5–5	2–5		
1971	Barton	7–3	3–3		
1972	Barton	6–3–1	4–1–1		
1973	Barton	10–1	6–0	1st	
1974	Barton	9–1	5–1		
1975	Barton	7–2–1	5–1–1		
1976	Barton	8–2	6–1		
1977	Barton	10–1	7–0	1st	
1978	Barton	14–0	7–0	1st	
1979	Barton	7–2–1	5–2		
Durant Tigers () (1980)
1980	Durant	6–3			
Durant:		6–3			
Barton Bears () (1981–2005)
1981	Barton	9–4	5–0	1st	
1982	Barton	11–2	5–0	1st	
1983	Barton	9–1	5–0	1st	
1984	Barton	6–3	4–1		
1985	Barton	7–3	5–0	1st	
1986	Barton	13–0	5–0	1st	
1987	Barton	13–0	4–0	1st	
1988	Barton	14–0	4–0	1st	
1989	Barton	11–0	3–0	1st	
1990	Barton	12–1	4–0	1st	
1991	Barton	10–1	7–0	1st	
1992	Barton	10–1	6–0	1st	
1993	Barton	13–0	8–0	1st	
1994	Barton	13–0	8–0	1st	
1995	Barton	12–1	8–0	1st	
1996	Barton	12–1	7–0	1st	
1997	Barton	15–0	7–0	1st	
1998	Barton	8–4	6–2		
1999	Barton	11–1	7–0	1st	
2000	Barton	12–1	8–0	1st	
2001	Barton	12–2	8–0	1st	
2002	Barton	10–2	8–1		
2003	Barton	13–1	8–0		
2004	Barton	6–4	5–3	4th	
2005	Barton	4–6	4–5	6th	
Barton:		349–59–3	199–26–2		
Total:		370–65–4			
National championship Conference title Conference division title or championship game berth
