= Fred Paul =

British actor and director (1880–1967)

Fred Paul (1880–1967) was a British actor and film director. He was born in Lausanne in 1880 but moved to Britain at a young age. He was a prolific actor and director in the 1910s and 1920s, but his career dramatically declined with the arrival of sound films.

== Selected filmography ==
Director

- The Dop Doctor (1915)
- Infelice (1915)
- The Second Mrs Tanqueray (1916)
- The Vicar of Wakefield (1916)
- Lady Windermere's Fan (1916)
- Her Greatest Performance (1916)
- The Lyons Mail (1916)
- The Duchess of Seven Dials (1920)
- The House on the Marsh (1920)
- Lady Tetley's Decree (1920)
- The Little Welsh Girl (1920)
- The English Rose (1920)
- Uncle Dick's Darling (1920)
- A Woman Misunderstood (1921)
- If Four Walls Told (1922)
- The Recoil (1924)
- The Last Witness (1925)
- Safety First (1926)
- Thou Fool (1926)
- The Luck of the Navy (1927)
- The Broken Melody (1929)
- In a Lotus Garden (1931)
- Romany Love (1931)

Actor

- East Lynne (1913)
- Sixty Years a Queen (1913)
- Lights of London (1914)
- The Dop Doctor (1915)
- Infelice (1915)
- The Rogues of London (1915)
- A Cinema Girl's Romance (1915)
- John Halifax, Gentleman (1915)
- If Four Walls Told (1922)
- The Right to Strike (1923)
- The Last Witness (1925)

Producer

- Dombey and Son (1917)
