= Holmfirth Studios =

British film studio

The Holmfirth Studios were an early British film studios that operated during the silent era. The studio was set up in the Yorkshire town of Holmfirth by the Bamforth Family firm, better known for producing postcards. The company released many shorts and a handful of feature films such as Paula, enjoying success before the First World War. In 1915 it was decided to shift production to the capital and a move to Clapham Studios followed, although the company's film venture was wound up soon afterwards.

== Bibliography ==
- Warren, Patricia. British Film Studios: An Illustrated History. Batsford, 2001.
