= Bertram Phillips =

Bertram Phillips was a British film director of the silent era.

In 1927–29, he directed several short films in the DeForest Phonofilm sound-on-film process, including Arthur Roberts Sings "Topsey-Turvey" (April 1927), The New Paris Lido Club Band (1928), Ag and Bert (1929) with Mabel Constanduros and Michael Hogan, and The Percival Mackey Trio (1929).

He died in 1942 aged 69.

== Selected filmography ==
- The White Star (1915)
- Won by Losing (1916)
- The Chance of a Lifetime (1916)
- A Man the Army Made (1917)
- Rock of Ages (1918)
- Faust (1923) comedy short film starring Jeff Barlow
- Tut-Tut and His Terrible Tomb (1923) comedy short film
- The School for Scandal (1923)
- The Alley of Golden Hearts (1924)
- Her Redemption (1924)

== See also ==
- Phonofilm
