= Ethel Bracewell =

British actress (died 1958)

- Died: 5 January 1958
- Occupation: Actress

Ethel Bracewell (died 5 January 1958) was a British actress who performed on stage and made films with the Zenith Film Company and British and Colonial Films. She was in films with Ernest Batley.

She made films with the Zenith Film Company in 1913. She made a filn with Ethyle Batley and Ernest Batley for the B&C Film Company in 1914. Her last leading role was as Bessie Webster in the romantic crime drama The Beggar Girl's Wedding directed by Leedham Bantock for the British Empire Film Company in 1915.

Two signed postcards of her were auctioned. Her photograph appears in a 1915 advertisement card. She died on 5 January 1958, at the age of 73.

== Theater ==
- The Women of France
- The Open Door
- The Apple of Eden
- The Prince and the Beggar Maid

== Filmography ==
- Ivanhoe (1913) as Rebecca
- The King's Romance (1914) as Vera
- The Master Crook Outwitted by a Child (1914)
- Retribution (1914) as Wife
