= The Taming of the Shrew on screen =

Screen adaptations of The Taming of the Shrew

There have been numerous on screen adaptations of Shakespeare's The Taming of the Shrew. The best-known cinematic adaptations are Sam Taylor's 1929 The Taming of the Shrew and Franco Zeffirelli's 1967 The Taming of the Shrew, both of which starred the most famous celebrity couples of their era; Mary Pickford and Douglas Fairbanks in 1929 and Elizabeth Taylor and Richard Burton in 1967. On television, perhaps the most significant adaptation is the 1980 BBC Television Shakespeare version, directed by Jonathan Miller and starring John Cleese and Sarah Badel.

The play has also been reworked numerous times for both cinema and television. Some of the better known adaptations include Kiss Me Kate, a 1953 filmic adaptation of Cole Porter's 1948 musical based on the play, McLintock! (1963), The Taming of the Scoundrel (1980), 10 Things I Hate About You (1999), Deliver Us from Eva (2003) and Isi Life Mein...! (2010).

== Film ==
=== Silent era ===
The Taming of the Shrew (1908), directed by D. W. Griffith

The earliest cinematic adaptation of the play is D.W. Griffith's eleven-minute The Taming of the Shrew, made for Biograph in 1908, starring Florence Lawrence as Katherina and Arthur V. Johnson as Petruchio. The blurb for the film stated "if we could see ourselves as others see us what models we would become." Also released in Italy in 1908 was the seven-minute La bisbetica domata, directed by Azeglio Pineschi and Lamberto Pineschi. There is no known cast list for this film. Unlike all other silent adaptations, this version retains the Katherina/Bianca sibling rivalry. In 1911, F.R. Benson directed a twelve-minute silent filmed extract from his own Shakespeare Memorial Theatre production, starring himself and his wife, Constance Benson. The film presented a heavily truncated pantomime version of the story, with pieces of Shakespeare's original text used as intertitles throughout. It is now believed lost, although several stills survive in the library archives of the Shakespeare Birthplace Trust. Also released in France in 1911 was La mégère apprivoisée, directed by Henri Desfontaines and starring Madeleine Barjac and Romauld Joubé. It is thought to be the first version to show scenes which take place off-stage in the play; in this case, the wedding and the journey to Petruchio's house. A 1913 Italian version, the twenty-two-minute La bisbetica domata, was directed by Arrigo Frusta and starred Gigetta Morano and Eleuterio Rodolfi. This version also shows scenes not in the play. Another English adaptation was released in 1915, directed by and starring Arthur Backner. This version is also lost. Intended more as a showcase for a new type of sound system than an adaptation of the play, the film consisted entirely of the scene where Petruchio and Katherina first meet. Shot using a process known as Voxograph, the actors spoke the complete text during filming, and when the film was played at the theatre, "the same actors, one at each side of the screen but unseen, repeated the words in what was supposed to be synchronisation. It was expected that the operator, after rehearsal, would be able to project the film so that picture and voice would jibe." The earliest surviving British filmic adaptation is Edwin J. Collins' 1923 version, adapted by Eliot Stannard, and starring Dacia Deane and Lauderdale Maitland. One of a series of forty-minute adaptations of classic texts released under the Gems of Literature banner, only the second half of the film survives, and the final scene is incomplete as a result of print damage. This version very much adopts Petruchio's perspective, and one of the intertitles reads "by noon the next day, though famished and weary for want of food and rest, the Shrew deep in her heart admired the man whose temper is greater than her own."

=== Sam Taylor (1929) ===
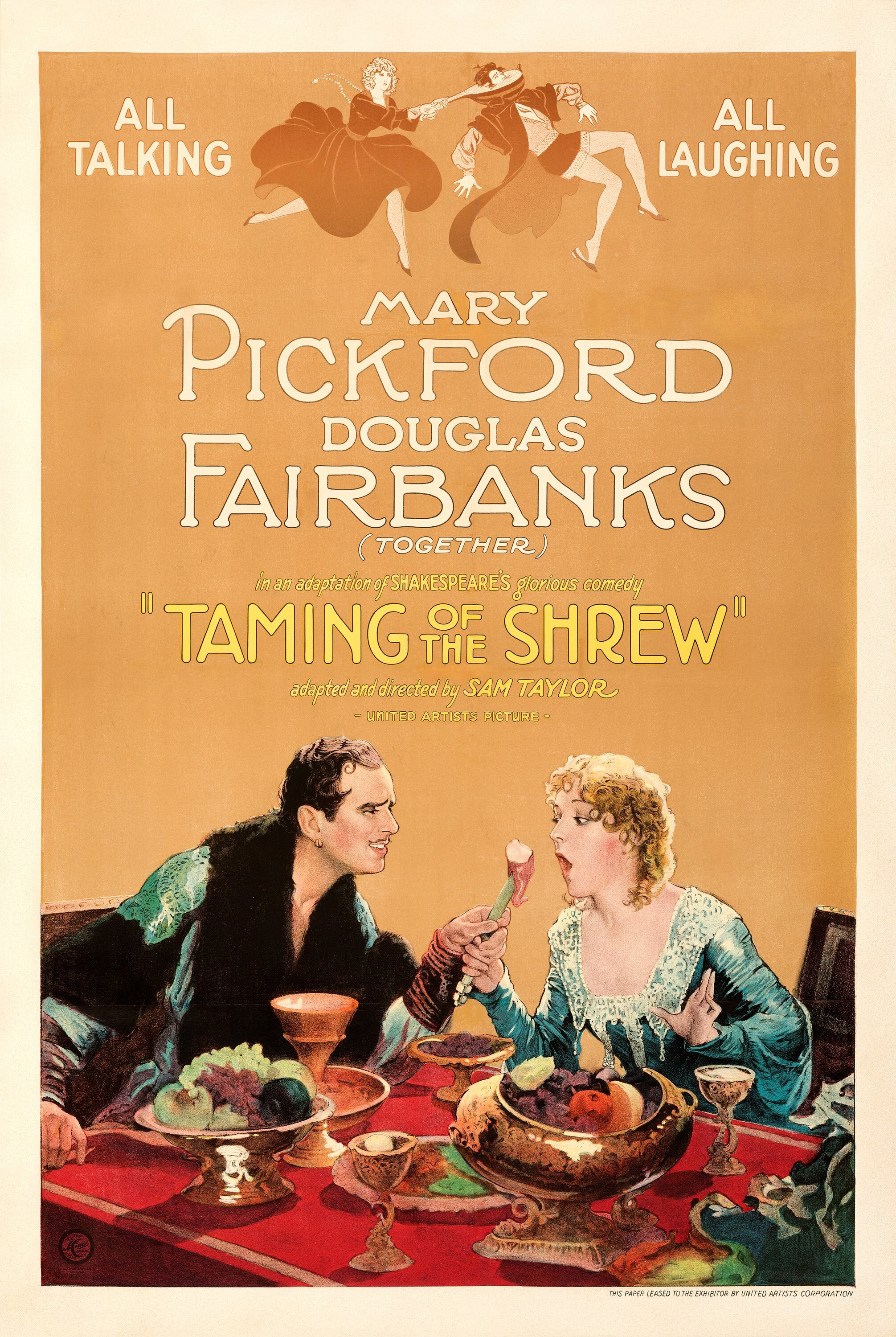
Poster for Sam Taylor's 1929 adaptation.

The first sound adaptation of the play was in 1929; Sam Taylor's The Taming of the Shrew, starring Mary Pickford and Douglas Fairbanks (the first sound adaptation of any Shakespeare play). This version was simultaneously shot as a silent film, and, depending on whether a given theatre was equipped to screen sound films, was released both as a "talkie" and a silent. Using only 500 lines from the original play, and a few lines from David Garrick's 1754 adaptation of Shrew, Catharine and Petruchio, the film is primarily known for how Pickford delivers Katherina's last speech. As she moves through the litany of reasons why a woman should obey her husband, she winks toward Bianca (Dorothy Jordan), unseen by Petruchio. Bianca smiles in silent communication with Katherina, thus acknowledging that Katherina has not been tamed at all. The film opens with a Punch and Judy puppet show which several critics have argued performs a similar function to the Christopher Sly Induction in the original play, but also works to instill a sense of false anticipation in the audience; the puppet show ends with Judy sinking lovingly into Punch's arms after he beats her. In the film, Katherina never sinks into Petruchio's arms. Indeed, Pickford's Katherina is much more resistant than in many stage versions; there is an extended scene of her wrecking Baptista's home, she only agrees to marry Petruchio when he stands on her foot and her scream is taken by the priest as consent, when she falls in the mud on the way to Petruchio's house, he offers to help but she refuses, she rejects meat at the dinner table rather than being tempted by it. Most significantly, when Petruchio outlines his plan to tame her "with kindness" (4.1.195), which is usually a soliloquy, Katherina hears him. She then proceeds to 'out-tame' him; when he messes up the bedclothes, she overturns the entire mattress, sparking a game of one-upmanship which ends when she flings a stool at him and knocks him out. The conversation about the sun and moon, so often seen as a pivotal turning point in the taming is then delivered with a befuddled Petruchio apparently genuinely unsure whether he is looking at the sun or the moon, and a worried Katherina trying to placate him. This is immediately followed by her 'submission' speech, and her wink. Elizabeth Schafer believes this is a Katherina that has not been tamed; "unlike Shakespeare's Katherina, Pickford's Katherina knows what Petruchio is trying to do in taming her and she responds to this tactically and successfully. Her surpassing of Petruchio's outrageous behaviour leaves him nonplussed and concussed." However, Pickford herself was unhappy with the film, and with how Taylor had directed her. In her autobiography, she wrote she wanted to play Katherina as a ferocious woman, but Taylor told her "We don't want any of that heavy stage drama; we want the old Pickford tricks." Pickford said of her performance, "Instead of being a forceful tiger-cat, I was a spitting little kitten."

=== Franco Zeffirelli (1967) ===
Poster for Franco Zeffirelli's 1967 film adaptation.

The next cinematic adaptation was Franco Zeffirelli's 1967 The Taming of the Shrew, starring Elizabeth Taylor and Richard Burton. This version omits the Induction; however, some critics have commented that the title sequence offers a modern 'replacement' for the Induction. The film begins with Lucentio (Michael York) and Tranio (Alfred Lynch) arriving in Padua in the middle of what appears to be a funeral. However, after a moment, the funeral suddenly transforms into a colourful party which moves from the church through the streets as the credits for the film play. Graham Holderness argues of this scene,

the collapse of an ecclesiastical service into a merciless parody, unrestrained revelry and orgiastic release is Zeffirelli's attempt to reconstruct the carnivals of the Middle Ages [...] in the course of the opening sequence, framed as an "induction" by the superimposition of the film titles, we observe the barbaric anti-ceremony of clerics wearing grotesque animal masks, sacred music giving way to obscene and cacophonous chants and a blasphemously parodic image of the Virgin. This ritualistic subversion of hierarchy and orthodoxy is a visually powerful and historically detailed dramatization of those medieval festivals of misrule conjecturally derived from the Saturnalian rituals of Rome [...] the elements of parody and subversion, the substitution of license for restraint, obscenity for virtue, the orgiastic celebration of the material body for the metaphysical rituals of the Mass, are here correctly identified as a form of drama [...] by jettisoning the Sly-frame, Zeffirelli may in the opinion of some observers have been indicating his contempt for the original. But [...] Zeffirelli has sought and found an alternative establishing context which is at once an educated and intelligent historical reconstruction and brilliant exposé of the production's principles of interpretation.

Sylvan Barnet believes that in this adaptation, "Kate and Petruchio fall in love almost as soon as they see each other." Barbara Hodgdon has also pointed out that several times, Katherina can be seen gazing longingly at Petruchio. Critics have also noted that Katherina twice consciously decides to go along with Petruchio. The first moment is behind the stained glass window when she silently decides to marry him. The second is when she follows him after he leaves her at the gates of Padua. In this version, Katherina delivers her final speech seemingly without irony. Zeffirelli and Burton both wanted Elizabeth Taylor to deliver the speech ironically, a la Mary Pickford, but Taylor felt it would be better to speak seriously, and then undermine that seriousness by leaving the banquet without Petruchio, thus subverting his apparent authority over her. However, Elizabeth Schafer calls the film "intensely conservative," citing the controversial advertising blurb; "A motion picture for every man who ever gave the back of his hand to his beloved...and for every woman who deserved it. Which takes in a lot of people! Russell Jackson argues the film "offers a 1960s liberation more likely to appeal to Lawrentians than present-day feminists." However, Schafer does go on to acknowledge that "because of the sheer power of Taylor's presence, Katherina occupies a far more memorable filmic space than the dramatic space she has in the original play.

=== Other releases ===
In 1961, Sergei Kolosov directed a black and white theatrical adaptation for Mosfilm, starring Lyudmila Kasatkina and Andrei Alekseyevich Popov. In 1983, John Allison directed a straight-to-video production played out on a bare Elizabethan stage modeled after the Globe Theatre. The film was part of a series called Shakespeare in Performance, which produced adaptations using relatively complete texts intended for use as educational tools in schools, with the primary aim being to show how the plays would have looked when originally performed. The production starred Karen Austin and Franklyn Seales.

=== Adaptations ===
Other film versions (which are loose adaptations as opposed to straight translations from stage to screen) include:

- Taming Mrs. Shrew (1912); director and cast unknown; sets the play in a contemporary milieu as a husband tries to tame his nagging wife.
- The Taming of the Shrewd (1912); directed by Harry A. Pollard, starring Norma Shearer and Reginald Denny; again sets the play in a contemporary milieu as a husband attempts to curtail his wife's attendance of local suffragette meetings by pretending to have an affair.
- The Iron Strain (1915); written by C. Gardner Sullivan, directed by Reginald Barker, starring Enid Markey and Dustin Farnum; relocates the story to modern-day New York and Alaska as a boorish prospector attempts to tame a beautiful but spoiled socialite. Released in the UK in 1917 under the title The Modern Taming of the Shrew.
- Impossible Catherine (1919); written by Frank S. Beresford, directed by John B. O'Brien, starring Virginia Pearson and William B. Davidson; relocates the story to modern-day Yale University where a literature student is inspired by his reading of the play to tame the feminist daughter of a wealthy banker.
- Daring Youth (1924); written by Dorothy Farnum, directed by William Beaudine, starring Bebe Daniels and Norman Kerry; when a soon to be married woman sees her unhappily married mother successfully exert her independence from her husband, the young woman decides to follow suit. Much to her annoyance, her husband is happy to go along with the idea.
- The Framing of the Shrew (1929); written by Octavus Roy Cohen, directed by Arvid E. Gillstrom, starring Evelyn Preer and Edward Thompson; when a man becomes exasperated with his domineering wife, he decides to tame her by initiating divorce proceedings and pretending he has a girlfriend.
- Elstree Calling (1930); a revue-style film featuring a series of sketches by British variety stars; an ongoing joke involves Donald Calthrop attempting to present Shakespeare in an "interesting and modern manner" but continually being prevented from doing so by the producers. Eventually, they allow him to present one scene - the initial meeting between Katherina and Petruchio. Calthrop plays Petruchio to Anna May Wong's Katherina, who responds to his advances by throwing furniture and food at him. Eventually Shakespeare himself (played by Gordon Begg) arrives, lamenting the quality of the production, before he is hit by a thrown pie; Taming of the Shrew section written by Adrian Brunel, directed by Alfred Hitchcock.
- You Made Me Love You (1933); written by Frank Launder, directed by Monty Banks, starring Thelma Todd and Stanley Lupino; a spoilt heiress is married off by her father to the first suitor to present himself, a songwriter with a penchant for practical jokes who must try to charm his way into her affections.
- Second Best Bed (1938); written by Ben Travers, directed by Tom Walls, starring Jane Baxter and Tom Walls; when a rich bachelor marries a spoilt woman, he sets about trying to mould her into the perfect wife.
- La bisbetica domata (1942); written by Sergio Amidei, directed by Ferdinando Maria Poggioli, starring Lilia Silvi and Amedeo Nazzari; relocates the story to modern-day Rome, with a veiled anti-fascist undercurrent.
- Makacs Kata (1943); written by István Békeffy and Piri Peéry, directed by Viktor Bánky, starring Emmi Buttykay and Miklós Hajmássy; relocates the play to contemporary Hungary where a rich heiress marries a peasant with the intention of divorcing him after a month so she can claim her inheritance. However, he takes her to his shack in the country where she must learn to live without wealth and privilege.
- A makrancos hölgy (1943); written and directed by Emil Martonffy, starring Katalin Karády and Pál Jávor; a musical adaptation set in contemporary Hungary.
- Enamorada (1946); written and directed by Emilio Fernández, starring Pedro Armendáriz and María Félix; a comedy drama set during the Mexican Revolution in which a revolutionary general takes the town of Cholula, meets the beautiful and tempestuous daughter of the richest man in town, falls in love, and makes the promise to marry her, even though she's engaged to an American businessman. After several unsuccessful attempts to make her fall in love with him, the general is about to surrender and leave the town.
- Marked Cards (1948), written by Ernesto Cortázar, René Cardona and Ramón Pérez Peláez, directed by René Cardona, starring Marga López and Pedro Infante; a farce set in contemporary Mexico, a couple married in an arranged marriage discover they hate one another and set about trying to outdo each other in an ongoing game of one-upmanship.
- Kiss Me Kate (1953); written for the screen by Dorothy Kingsley, directed by George Sidney, starring Kathryn Grayson and Howard Keel; filmic adaptation of the 1948 musical by Cole Porter.
- La fierecilla domada (1956); written by Manuel Villegas López, Jesús María de Arozamena, José Luis Colina and Antonio Román, directed by Antonio Román, starring Carmen Sevilla and Alberto Closas; a musical set in a small village in modern-day Spain.
- Abba Aa Hudugi (1959); written and directed by H.L.N. Simha, starring Kalyankumar and Mynavathi; Kannada language film telling a story broadly identical to the original.
- Ah min hawaa (1962); written by Mohamed Abu Youssef, directed by Fatin Abdel Wahab, starring Lobna Abdel Aziz and Rushdy Abaza; set in contemporary Egypt, a lowly vet agrees to marry the tempestuous elder granddaughter of a wealthy landowner, so the younger daughter may marry the man she loves.
- Gundamma Katha (1962); An official remake of the Kannada film Mane Thumbida Hennu (1958), this Telugu movie starred Suryakantam and N. T. Rama Rao; set in India, the film is loosely based on certain aspects of the play and tells the story of a rich widow who ill-treats her step-daughter until she is made to see the error of her ways by her two sons-in-law.
- Manithan Maravillai (1962); written by Thanjai N. Ramaiah Dass, directed by Aluri Chakrapani, starring M. S. Sundari Bai and Gemini Ganesan; a Tamil language remake of Mane Thumbida Hennu (1958) and shot simultaneously in Telugu as Gundamma Katha.
- McLintock! (1963); written by James Edward Grant, directed by Andrew V. McLaglen, starring Maureen O'Hara and John Wayne; relocates the play to the American Old West where a wealthy cattle baron has to try to keep his tempestuous wife under control.
- Arivaali (1963); written and directed by A. T. Krishnaswami, starring Bhanumathi Ramakrishna and Sivaji Ganesan; the story of a socially conscientious man who fights for the welfare of the local villagers and the spoiled daughter of a rich farmer.
- Pattikada Pattanama (1972); written by Bala Murugan; directed by P. Madhavan, starring Jayalalithaa and Sivaji Ganesan; the story of a rich young man who marries a woman educated abroad, leading to a tempestuous marriage.
- Bahaddur Gandu (1976); penned by the celebrated playwright H. V. Subba Rao, starring Dr. Rajkumar; Kannada language film telling a story broadly identical to the original.
- The Taming of the Scoundrel (1980); written and directed by Franco Castellano and Giuseppe Moccia, starring Ornella Muti and Adriano Celentano; set in modern-day Italy, the film reverses the gender paradigm, as a young woman tries to curtail the bad behavior of a grumpy farmer.
- Nanjundi Kalyana (1989); written by Chi. Udayashankar; directed by M. S. Rajashekar, starring Malashri and Raghavendra Rajkumar; Kannada language film telling a story similar to the original but in a modern family setting. The film was remade in Telugu in 1990 as Mahajananiki Maradalu Pilla.
- The Taming of the Screw (1997); written and directed by Jim Powers, starring Mila Shegol and Tony Martino; a pornographic adaptation in which a young lawyer is told he will be made partner in the law firm for which he works if he marries the boss' tempestuous daughter. He decides to tame her by forcing her to have sex with as many of his friends as he can, something she is more than happy to do.
- 10 Things I Hate About You (1999), written by Karen McCullah Lutz and Kirsten Smith, directed by Gil Junger, starring Julia Stiles and Heath Ledger; recasts the play as a teen romantic comedy set in 'Padua High School', where an overprotective father decides that his popular younger daughter cannot date until his shrewish older daughter begins to date, much to the chagrin of the younger girl's many admirers, who decide to work together to find someone willing to date the elder daughter.
- Deliver Us from Eva (2003); written by James Iver Mattson and B.E. Brauner, directed by Gary Hardwick, starring Gabrielle Union and LL Cool J; relocates the play to modern Los Angeles, where a shrewish woman is constantly interfering in the affairs of her family and friends. Fed up with the intrusion, they get together and pay a local playboy to date her and teach her a lesson, but he finds himself unexpectedly falling for her.
- Kate-La bisbetica domata (2004); written and directed by Roberto Lione, starring Daniela Cavallini and Neri Marcorè; animated film which uses stop motion animation techniques but with construction paper puppets rather than clay or graphics - a technique Lione refers to as "papermotion."
- Nalnari jongbujeon (2008); written by Park Yeon-seon, directed by Won-kuk Lim, starring Park Jung-ah and Park Jin Woo; set in contemporary South Korea, a shy and quiet young man is pursued by a spoiled woman used to getting what she wants. When he introduces her to his family, they decide she is not ladylike enough and set about taming her.
- Isi Life Mein...! (2010); written by Vidhi Kasliwal and Sulekha Bajpai, directed by Vidhi Kasliwal, starring Sandeepa Dhar and Akshay Oberoi; when a young girl is sent to college in Mumbai, she joins the Dramatics Society, which is currently working on a production of The Taming of the Shrew for the National Theatre Festival. However, when several members of the cast complain that the play is sexist, the director decides to rewrite it, removing any misogyny, and renaming it The Taming of the Shrew - Reborn.

== Television ==
The earliest screening of the play is often inaccurately reported to have been broadcast on BBC Television Service in 1939, directed by Dallas Bower and starring Margaretta Scott and Austin Trevor. However, this was an adaptation of Garrick's Catharine and Petruchio, not Shakespeare's Shrew.

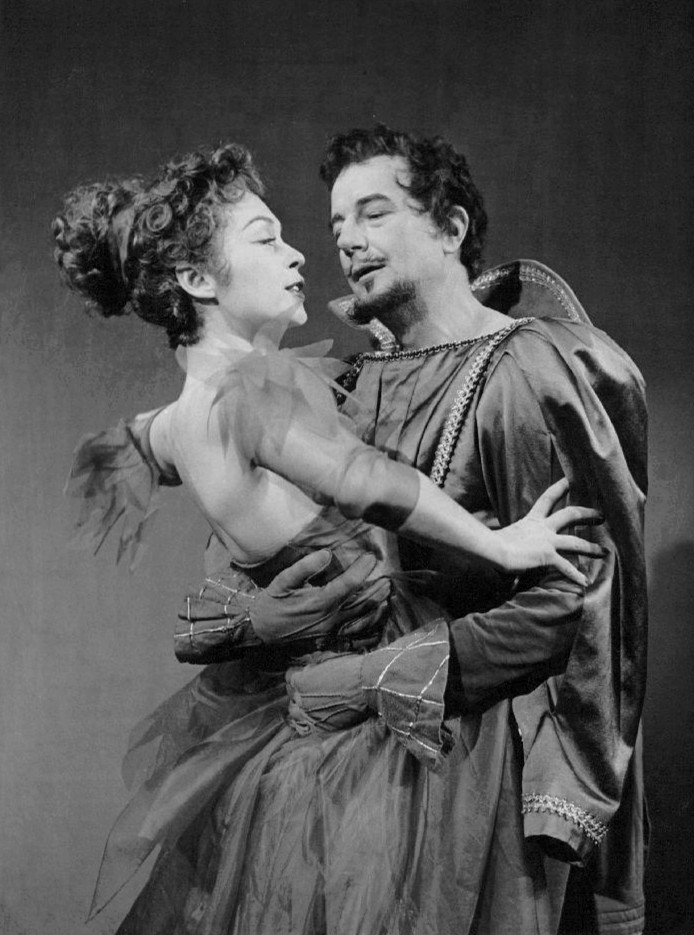
Lilli Palmer and Maurice Evans in the 1956 Hallmark Hall of Fame adaptation directed by George Schaefer.

The first television performance of the Shakespearean text was in the United States in 1950, broadcast live on CBS as part of the Westinghouse Studio One series. A heavily edited sixty-minute modern-dress performance, written by Worthington Miner and directed by Paul Nickell, it starred Lisa Kirk and Charlton Heston. Katherina's opening speech in 4.3, beginning with "the more my wrong, the more his spite appears" was delivered in the form of a voice-over, an unusual technique at the time. The production is also notable insofar as when she hugs Petruchio after her climactic speech, she winks at the camera. Diana E. Henderson writes "this version relentlessly reiterates conventional post-war ideas of gender difference [...] the production as a whole serves to legitimatise the domestication of women." In 1952, BBC Television Service screened a live adaptation as part of their Sunday Night Theatre series, directed by Desmond Davis and starring Margaret Johnston and Stanley Baker. In 1956, NBC's Hallmark Hall of Fame screened the first colour television adaptation, directed by George Schaefer, and starring Lilli Palmer and Maurice Evans (who also produced). The initial script was written by Michael Hogan, who included the Induction, and kept Sly on stage for the entire show, which culminated with him beating his own wife, much to the delight of the actors who have just performed for him. This script, however, was heavily rewritten by Hall of Fame producer William Nichols, who removed the frame. The production instead opens with Grumio (Jerome Kilty) addressing the camera directly, inviting the audience to view the "antic players." A commedia dell'arte-style production, Katherina and Petruchio first meet in a boxing ring, with their initial encounter, literally, turning into a boxing match.

In 1982, CBC broadcast Peter Dews' production from the Stratford Shakespeare Festival in Ontario. Directed for television by Norman Campbell, it starred Sharry Flett and Len Cariou, with Desmond Ellis as Sly. This is the first known television version to include the Sly framework. Elizabeth Schafer describes the effect of using the Induction in a TV production as "Brechtian without ever being too solemn." Also in 1982, the play inaugurated the Channel 4 series Shakespeare Lives! Conceived by director Michael Bogdanov as a direct reply to the BBC Television Shakespeare, which he loathed, the series examined six plays using National Theatre actors and a live audience, with whom Bogdanov and the actors would speak, often re-acting scenes using different suggestions from audience members. The Taming of the Shrew episode was the basis of a two-part Roundhouse Theatre workshop starring Suzanne Bertish and Daniel Massey, which addressed whether or not the play demeans women, or depicts how they are demeaned in society.

In 1986, the television series Moonlighting produced an episode entitled "Atomic Shakespeare", written by Ron Osborn and Jeff Reno (with a writing credit for William 'Budd' Shakespeare), and directed by Will Mackenzie. The episode recasts the show's main characters in a self-referential comedic parody of The Taming of the Shrew. The episode opens with a boy who is annoyed that he has to read The Shrew for his homework, rather than watching his favourite programme, Moonlighting itself. He goes to his room and begins reading, and the episode then takes place in his mind as he imagines the members of the cast of Moonlighting in an adaptation of the play itself, with Cybill Shepherd as Katherina and Bruce Willis as Petruchio.

In 1994, BBC aired an adaptation as part of Shakespeare: The Animated Tales. This version adapted the end of The Taming of a Shrew to round out the frame; after Sly announces he now knows how to tame a shrew, he proudly walks back into the tavern to confront the hostess, but almost immediately, he is flung back out, in exactly the same way as the episode began. Directed by Aida Ziablikova and adapted from Shakespeare by Leon Garfield, it is voiced by Amanda Root and Nigel Le Vaillant, with Malcolm Storry as Sly.

The 1999 Chilean soap opera La Fiera is a free adaptation of the play; the story is set in the late 1990s and relocated to Chiloé, an island in the south of Chile. The role of Katherina is played by Claudia Di Girólamo (as Catalina Chamorro), a tough, free-spirited woman who refuses to settle as a wife; she eventually finds love with Martín Echaurren (Francisco Reyes, who plays the role of Petruchio), one of her suitors. Similarly, the 2000-2001 Brazilian Soap opera O Cravo e a Rosa relocates the play to 1920s São Paulo and introduces Catarina, a wealthy feminist who doesn't believe in marriage and slowly finds herself falling in love with a gruff peasant farmer named Petruchio.This is the third version of the work to be adapted into a telenovela in Brazil, following A Indomável, by Ivani Ribeiro on TV Excelsior in 1965, and O Machão, by Sérgio Jockyman on Rede Tupi in 1974. Created by Walcyr Carrasco, the show starred Adriana Esteves and Eduardo Moscovis as Catarina and Petruchio, respectively. In 2002, the television series One on One produced an episode called "Tame me, I'm a Shrew". Written by Kenny Buford and directed by Dana De Vally Piazza the episode depicts the main character, Breanna (Kyla Pratt) getting the leading part in a school performance of The Taming Of The Shrew. Upon finding Shakespeare's language difficult and out of date, she creates a rap version. However, she allows her ego to get the better of her, and unconsciously attempts to take over the production from the director, who ultimately fires her, and hires her best friend for the role instead. In 2003, an episode of The Anna Nicole Show, called "Shrew's the Boss?", featured Anna Nicole Smith attending acting classes in Los Angeles, where she performs the first meeting between Katherina and Petruchio, alongside actor Danny Bonaduce.

In 2005, BBC One broadcast an adaptation for the ShakespeaRe-Told series, written by Sally Wainwright and directed by David Richards. Written in modern prose, the episode relocates the story to contemporary London, where Katherine (Shirley Henderson) is an abrasive career politician who is told she must find a husband if she wants to become the party leader. Meanwhile, her supermodel sister Bianca (Jaime Murray) has fallen in love with Lucentio (Santiago Cabrera) and wants to marry him, but Bianca's manager, Harry (Stephen Tompkinson), has long believed she will marry him. To put him off, Bianca announces she will not marry until her sister is married (as she believes Katherine will never marry). Harry then arranges a meeting between his friend Petruchio (Rufus Sewell) and Katherine. Harry bets Petruchio that he will not be able to woo Katherine, so, determined to prove him wrong, Petruchio sets out to win her over. At the end of the episode, Katherine's 'submission' speech is triggered when Bianca is annoyed that Lucentio refuses to sign a pre-nuptial agreement. Katherine states it is a woman's duty to love and obey her husband, but with the requirement that he do precisely the same for her. Petruchio even willingly becomes a "house-husband" for their young children whilst Katherine is elected as Prime Minister.

In 2009, ABC Family adapted the 1999 film 10 Things I Hate About You as a sitcom of the same name, starring Lindsey Shaw and Ethan Peck.

In 2014, the play featured in an episode of My Shakespeare on Sky Arts. Each episode of the show is hosted by an actor discussing their favourite Shakespearean play with other actors and theatrical professionals. Scholars are also interviewed in each episode, and clips from various productions are shown, as well as scenes shot specifically for the show at Shakespeare's Globe. The Taming of the Shrew episode is hosted by Morgan Freeman, who had played Petruchio in 1990 at the Delacorte Theater. Interviewees include Tracey Ullman (who played Katherina to Freeman's Petruchio), Sinéad Cusack (Barry Kyle's 1982 production at the Barbican), Brian Cox and Fiona Shaw (Jonathan Miller's 1987 RSC production), Julie Taymor (directed a 1988 production at the Triplex Theatre in New York), Germaine Greer (feminist writer), Jonathan Bate (Provost at Worcester College, Oxford), Farah Karim-Cooper (Head of Education at Shakespeare's Globe), and Laura Maguire (Professor of English, Magdalen College, Oxford). Footage is included from D.W. Griffith's 1908 film, Franco Zeffirelli's 1967 film, Wilford Leach's 1978 Delacorte Theater production starring Meryl Streep and Raúl Juliá, Jonathan Miller's 1980 BBC Television Shakespeare production, A. J. Antoon's 1990 Delacorte Theatre production (in which Freeman and Ullman appeared) and Toby Frow's 2012 Shakespeare's Globe production. Footage from Shakespeare's Globe depicts two different performances of the "I will be master of what is mine own" (3.2.231-235) speech; one delivered in an aggressive threatening manner, one in a bawdy sexual manner, directed by Adele Thomas and performed by Eleanor Matsuura and Anthony Howell.

=== BBC Television Shakespeare (1980) ===
In 1980, BBC2 aired an adaptation for their BBC Television Shakespeare series, directed by Jonathan Miller and starring Sarah Badel and John Cleese. The casting of Cleese as Petruchio was not without controversy at the time. He had never performed Shakespeare before, was not a fan of the first two seasons of the BBC Television Shakespeare, and took some persuading from Miller that the BBC Shrew would not be, as he feared "about a lot of furniture being knocked over, a lot of wine being spilled, a lot of thighs being slapped and a lot of unmotivated laughter." Miller told Cleese that the episode would interpret Petruchio as an early Puritan more concerned with attempting to show Kate how preposterous her behaviour is (showing her "an image of herself" as Miller put it), rather than bullying her into submission, and so the part was not to be acted along the lines of the swaggering bully a la Richard Burton in Franco Zeffirelli's adaptation. According to Cleese, who consulted a psychiatrist who specialised in treating "shrews",

Petruchio doesn't believe in his own antics, but in the craftiest and most sophisticated way he needs to show Kate certain things about her behaviour. He takes one look at her and realises that here is the woman for him, but he has to go through the process of 'reconditioning' her before anything else. So he behaves just as outrageously as she does in order to make her aware of the effect that her behaviour has on other people [...] Kate needs to be made happy - she is quite clearly unhappy at the beginning of the play, and then extremely happy at the end because of what she has achieved with Petruchio's help."

Miller also researched how troublesome children were treated at the Tavistock Clinic, where imitation is often used during therapy; "there are ways in which a skilful therapist will gently mock a child out of a tantrum by giving an amusing imitation of the tantrum immediately after it's happened. The child then has a mirror held up to it and is capable of seeing what it looks like to others." In his review of the adaptation for the Financial Times, Chris Dunkley referred to this issue, calling Cleese's Petruchio "an eccentrically pragmatic social worker using the wayward client's own doubtful habits to calm her down." Actress Sarah Badel had a similar conception of the psychology behind the production. She constructed an "imaginary biography" for Katherina, arguing "She's a woman of such passion [...] a woman of such enormous capacity for love that the only way she could be happy is to find a man of equal capacity. Therefore she's mad for lack of love [...] he feigns madness, she is teetering on the edge of it. Petruchio is the only man who shows her what she's like." In this reading of the play, the production was at least partially based on Miller's own 1972 Chichester Festival stage production starring Joan Plowright and Anthony Hopkins.

Miller was determined the production not become a farce, and in that vein, two key texts were Lawrence Stone's The Family, Sex and Marriage in England: 1500-1800 and Michael Walzer's The Revolution of the Saints, which he used to help ground his interpretation in recognisably Renaissance-esque societal terms; Petruchio's actions are based on accepted economic, social and religious views of the time, as are Baptista's. In tandem with this interpretation, the song sung at the end of the play is a musical version of Psalm 128 ("Blessed is everyone that feareth the Lord"), which was often sung in Puritan households at the end of a meal during Shakespeare's own day, and which praised a peaceful family life. Speaking of the addition of the psalm, Miller states "I had to give [the conclusion] an explicitly religious format, so people could see it as not just simply the high-jinks of an intolerantly selfish man who was simply destroying a woman to satisfy his own vanity, but a sacramental view of the nature of marriage, whereby this couple had come to love each other by reconciling themselves to the demands of a society which saw obedience as a religious requirement." Along these lines, Miller was also insistent that to interpret the play in light of twentieth-century feminism was a flawed approach; "what we think now is really quite beside the point. If everything is done in the light of what we think, it's a sort of historical egocentricity, which is quite intolerable." Diana E. Henderson was unimpressed with this approach, however, writing "it was the perfect production to usher in the neo-conservative 1980s" and "this BBC-TV museum piece unabashedly celebrates the order achieved through female submission."

In this adaptation, the induction and all subsequent references to Sly are absent. Speaking of the somewhat controversial decision to remove the induction, Miller wrote "I find [it] terribly hard to do in any other format but the stage: it is a stage device, and it's frightfully hard to see it on television. It's a device that brings the audience into close identification with some person who is like them. It would be on television a little extra programme tagged on before the programme proper begins. On the stage, it's possible to make it work much better: it's a folk style which sits rather uncomfortably in this very twentieth-century medium of domestic viewing." Similarly, the BBC Shakespeare's textual editor, David Snodin wrote

Jonathan Miller and I decided after considerable discussion to omit the whole of that curious, lengthy, and disappointingly unresolved opening known as the "Induction". We made this decision for the following reasons: firstly, because we felt that it may confuse the viewer coming to the play for the first time, very possibly to the detriment of his enjoyment of the play as a whole; secondly, because it is an essentially theatrical device which, while it has been known to work well in a theatre before a live audience, would not come across successfully in the very different medium of television; and lastly, because it is a device which presents the play's characters as 'actors', and we felt that this would hinder the attempt, in this production, to present them as real people in a real, and ultimately quite serious situation.

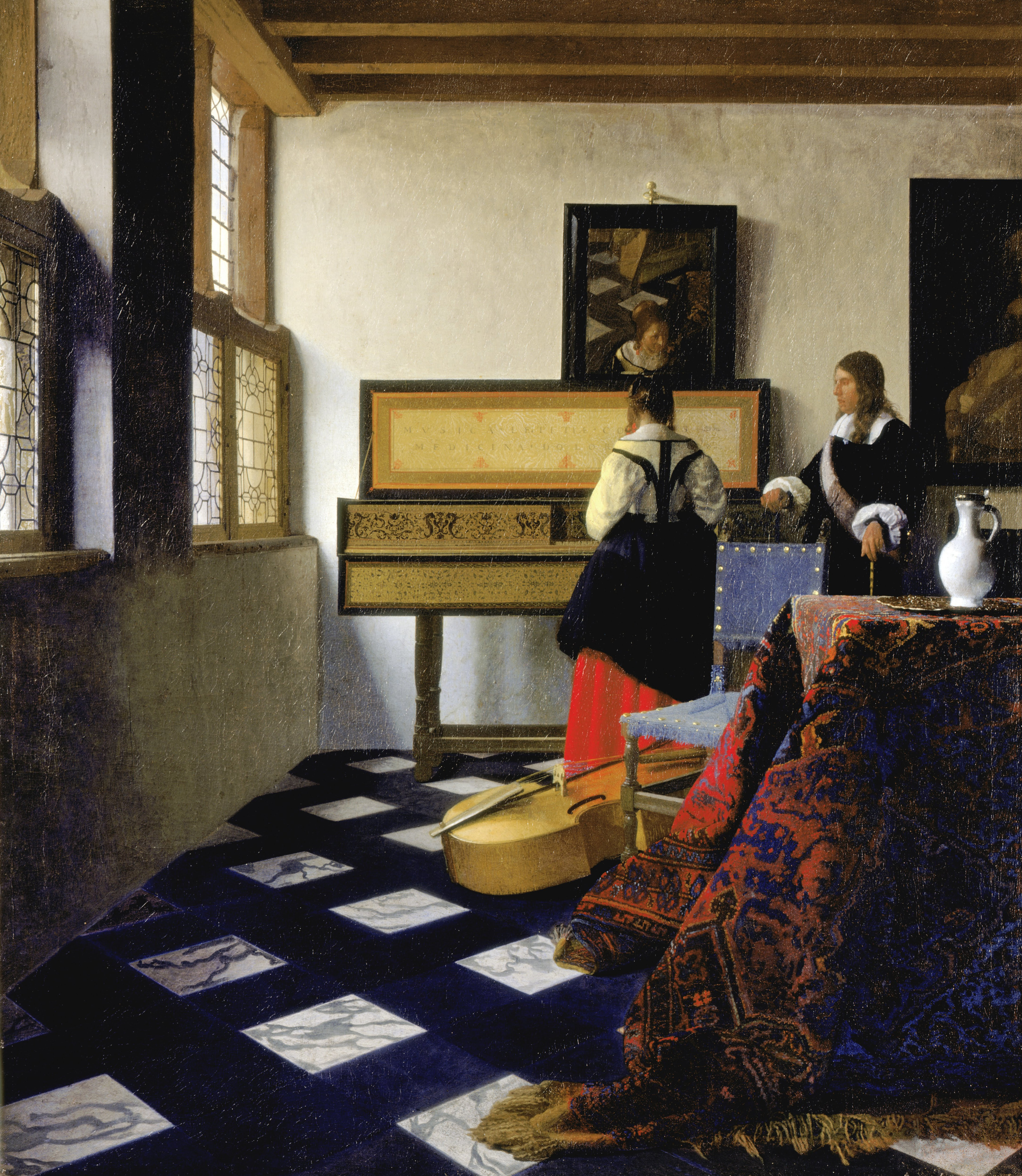
The interior of Baptista's house in the 1980 BBC Television Shakespeare adaptation (top); the set design is closely modelled on Vermeer's The Music Lesson (bottom).

As with all of the episodes Jonathan Miller directed, he allowed the work of celebrated artisans to influence his design concepts. In the case of Shrew, the street set was based on the work of architect Sebastiano Serlio, as well as the Teatro Olimpico, designed by Andrea Palladio. Baptista's living room was modelled closely on Johannes Vermeer's The Music Lesson.

== List of screen adaptations ==
=== Direct adaptations ===
==== Cinema/video ====
- The Taming of the Shrew (1908); directed by D. W. Griffith (USA)
- La bisbetica domata (1908); directed by Azeglio Pineschi and Lamberto Pineschi (Italy)
- The Taming of the Shrew (1911); filmed extract from the Shakespeare Memorial Theatre directed by F.R. Benson (UK)
- La mégère apprivoisée (1911); directed by Henri Desfontaines (France)
- La bisbetica domata (1913); directed by Arrigo Frusta (Italy)
- The Taming of the Shrew (1915); directed by Arthur Backner (UK)
- The Taming of the Shrew (1923); directed by Edwin J. Collins (UK)
- The Taming of the Shrew (1929); first sound adaptation; directed by Sam Taylor (USA)
- Ukroshchenie stroptivoy (1961); directed by Sergei Kolosov (USSR)
- The Taming of the Shrew (1967); directed by Franco Zeffirelli (Italy/USA)
- The Taming of the Shrew (1983); straight-to-video film directed by John Allison (USA)

==== Television ====
- The Taming of the Shrew (1950); Westinghouse Studio One adaptation; directed by Paul Nickell (CBS; USA)
- The Taming of the Shrew (1952); Sunday Night Theatre adaptation; directed by Desmond Davis (BBC Television Service; UK)
- The Taming of the Shrew (1956); Hallmark Hall of Fame adaptation; directed by George Schaefer (NBC; USA)
- Der Widerspenstigen Zähmung (1958); made-for-TV film; directed by Ludwig Berger (Das Erste; West Germany)
- Der Widerspenstigen Zähmung (1962); TV broadcast of a 1961 stage production from the Residenztheater; directed by Heinz Hilpert (Das Erste; West Germany)
- La mégère apprivoisée (1964); made-for-TV film; directed by Pierre Badel (TF1; France)
- Der Widerspenstigen Zähmung (1971); TV broadcast of a stage production from the Residenztheater; directed by Otto Schenk (Das Erste; West Germany)
- Poskromienie złośnicy (1971); made-for-TV film; directed by Zygmunt Hübner (TVP1; Poland)
- The Taming of the Shrew (1973); TV broadcast of a stage production from the Sydney Opera House; directed by Robin Lovejoy (ABC Television; Australia)
- De getemde feeks (1975); TV broadcast of a stage production from the Royal Flemish Theatre; directed by Senne Rouffaer; directed for television by Robert Lussac (Eén; Netherlands)
- The Taming of the Shrew (1976); TV broadcast of an American Conservatory Theater production, aired on the Great Performances series; directed by William Ball; directed for TV by Kirk Browning (PBS; USA)
- The Taming of the Shrew (1980); BBC Television Shakespeare adaptation; directed by Jonathan Miller (BBC2; UK)
- The Taming of the Shrew (1982); TV broadcast of a stage production from the Stratford Shakespeare Festival; directed by Peter Dews; directed for television by Norman Campbell (CBLT-DT; Canada)
- The Taming of the Shrew (1989); TV broadcast of a stage production from the Stratford Shakespeare Festival; directed by Richard Monette; directed for television by Norman Campbell (CBLT-DT; Canada)
- Poskromienie złośnicy (1990); made-for-TV film; directed by Michał Kwieciński (TVP1; Poland)
- De getemde feeks (1991); TV broadcast of a 1986 stage production from the Theater Malpertuis; directed by Dirk Tanghe; directed for television by Berend Boudewijn (Nederland 1; Netherlands)
- Poskromienie złośnicy (1993); TV broadcast of a stage production from the National Theatre, Warsaw; directed by Jerzy Stuhr; directed for television by Stanisław Zajączkowski (TVP1; Poland)
- "The Taming of the Shrew" (1994); Shakespeare: The Animated Tales adaptation; directed by Aida Ziablikova (BBC 2; Russia/UK)
- The Taming of the Shrew (2016); TV/cinema broadcast of a stage production from the Stratford Shakespeare Festival filmed as part of CBC Presents the Stratford Festival; directed by Chris Abraham; directed for television by Barry Avrich (CBLT-DT; Canada)

=== Other adaptations ===
==== Cinema/video ====
- Taming Mrs. Shrew (1912); relocates the story to modern-day Los Angeles; director unknown (USA)
- The Taming of the Shrewd (1912); relocates the story to modern day Los Angeles; directed by Harry A. Pollard (USA)
- The Iron Strain (1915; released in the UK in 1917 as The Modern Taming of the Shrew); relocates the story to modern day New York; directed by Reginald Barker (USA)
- Impossible Catherine (1919); relocates the story to modern day Yale University; directed by John B. O'Brien (USA)
- Daring Youth (1924); when an unhappily married woman successfully exerts her independence from her husband, her daughter attempts to follow suit; directed by William Beaudine (USA)
- The Framing of the Shrew (1929); a man tries to tame his domineering wife; directed by Arvid E. Gillstrom (USA)
- Elstree Calling (1930); revue-style series of comedy sketches which includes the wedding scene from The Taming of the Shrew; sketch directed by Alfred Hitchcock (UK)
- You Made Me Love You (1933); modern update of the story; directed by Monty Banks (UK)
- Second Best Bed (1938); modern update of the story; directed by Tom Walls (UK)
- La bisbetica domata (1942); relocates the story to modern day Rome; directed by Ferdinando Maria Poggioli (Italy)
- Makacs Kata (1943); relocates the story to modern day Hungary; directed by Viktor Bánky (Hungary)
- A makrancos hölgy (1943); musical adaptation in modern-day Hungary; directed by Emil Martonffy (Hungary)
- Enamorada (1946); set during the Mexican Revolution; directed by Emilio Fernández (Mexico)
- Cartas marcadas (1948); relocates the story to modern day Mexico; directed by René Cardona (Mexico)
- Kiss Me Kate (1953); adaptation of Cole Porter's 1948 musical; directed by George Sidney (USA)
- La fierecilla domada (1956); musical set in modern-day Spain; directed by Antonio Román (Spain)
- Abba Aa Hudugi (1959); Kannada language film, directed by H.L.N. Simha (India)
- Ah min hawaa (1962); relocates the story to modern Egypt; directed by Fatin Abdel Wahab (Egypt)
- Gundamma Katha (1962); certain aspects of the play set in contemporary set in India; directed by Kamalakara Kameswara Rao (India)
- Manithan Maravillai (1962); Tamil language remake of Gundamma Katha, directed by Aluri Chakrapani (India)
- McLintock! (1963); relocates the story to the American Old West; directed by Andrew V. McLaglen (USA)
- Arivaali (1963); relocates the story to a South Indian Tamil village; directed by A. T. Krishnaswami (India)
- Pattikada Pattanama (1972); a rich man marries a foreign-educated woman; directed by P. Madhavan (India)
- The Taming of the Scoundrel (1980); relocates the play to modern-day Italy and reverses the gender paradigm; directed by Franco Castellano and Giuseppe Moccia (Italy)
- Nanjundi Kalyana (1989); Kannada language film, directed by M. S. Rajashekar (India)
- The Taming of the Screw (1997); pornographic adaptation; directed by Jim Powers (USA)
- 10 Things I Hate About You (1999); teen comedy; directed by Gil Junger (USA)
- Deliver Us from Eva (2003); loose modern update; directed by Gary Hardwick (USA)
- Kate – La bisbetica domata (2004); animated adaptation; directed by Roberto Lione (Italy)
- Nalnari jongbujeon (2008); relocates the story to modern day South Korea; directed by Won-kuk Lim (South Korea)
- Isi Life Mein...! (2010); loose modern update of the story set in India; directed by Vidhi Kasliwal (India)

==== Television ====
- Katharine and Petruchio (1939); TV adaptation of David Garrick's Catharine and Petruchio; directed by Dallas Bower (BBC Television Service; UK)
- "The Taming of the Shrew" (1950); episode of the children's TV show Mr. I. Magination in which a conductor on the train to Imagination Land teaches a young boy about Shakespeare (CBS; USA)
- The Taming of the Shrew (1954); NBC Television Opera Theatre presentation of Vittorio Giannini and Dorothy Fee's operatic version of the play; directed by John Bloch (NBC; USA)
- The Tamer Tamed (1956); made-for-TV pseudo-sequel to the play; written by Elaine Morgan; directed by Anthony Pelissier (BBC Television Service; UK)
- Kiss Me, Kate (1958); Hallmark Hall of Fame adaptation of Cole Porter's Kiss Me, Kate; directed by George Schaefer (NBC; USA)
- Kiss Me, Kate (1964); made-for-TV film directed by David Askey (BBC2; UK)
- A Indomável (1965); made-for-TV adaptation of the Ivani Ribeiro novel of the same name, directed by Wálter Avancini (Rede Excelsior; Brazil)
- Bonanza (1965) The episode "Woman of Fire" is inspired by the play
- Kiss Me, Kate (1968); made-for-TV film directed by Paul Bogart (ABC; USA)
- The Taming of the Shrew (1972); live broadcast from the Staatsoper Stuttgart of John Cranko's 1968 ballet adaptation of the play; directed by Bernard Kontarsky (BBC2; UK)
- O Machão (1974-1975); Brazilian TV soap opera based on the play and A Indomável (1965), created by Ivani Ribeiro, Sérgio Jockyman, and Dárcio Ferreira (Rede Tupi; Brazil)
- Kiss Me, Kate (1975); made-for-TV film; directed by Nico Knapper (Nederland 1; Netherlands)
- Kiss Me, Petruchio (1979); documentary about the production of Wilford Leach's 1978 Delacorte Theater production for the New York Shakespeare Festival; directed by Christopher Dixon (BBC2; UK/USA)
- Shakespeare Lives! (1983); workshop documentary presented by Michael Bogdanov at the Roundhouse Theatre examining if the play is misogynistic; directed by Mary McMurray; (Channel 4; UK)
- "Atomic Shakespeare" (1986); episode of the TV show Moonlighting presented as a parody of the play; directed by Will Mackenzie (ABC; USA)
- La fiera (1999); Chilean TV soap opera based on the themes of the play; written by Victor Carrasco (TVN); Chile
- O Cravo e a Rosa (2000-2001); TV soap opera based on the themes of the play; created by Walcyr Carrasco (Rede Globo; Brazil)
- "Tame Me, I'm the Shrew" (2002); episode of the TV show One on One featuring a performance of the play; directed by Dana De Vally Piazza (UPN; USA)
- "Shrew's the Boss" (2003); episode of The Anna Nicole Show in which Anna Nicole Smith performs a scene from the play (E!; USA)
- Kiss Me, Kate (2003); TV broadcast of a 1999 production from the Victoria Palace Theatre; screened as part of the Great Performances series; directed by Michael Blakemore (USA)
- "The Taming of the Shrew" (2005); ShakespeaRe-Told adaptation; written by Sally Wainwright; directed by Dave Richards (BBC One; UK)
- 10 Things I Hate About You (2009-2010); TV series based on the 1999 film; created by Carter Covington (ABC Family; USA)
- "My Shakespeare: Morgan Freeman" (2014); episode of My Shakespeare presented by Morgan Freeman looking at the textual and performance history of the play; directed by Richard Denton (Sky Arts; UK)
- Call Me Katie (2015); Australian web series adaptation; written and directed by Freddie Spencer and Erin Smith (Australia)
- The Heart Killers (2024-2025); Thai TV series adaptation of the 1999 film 10 Things I Hate About You and the Taming of the Shrew. Centers around two assassin brothers being wooed by a police informant and mechanic.
