= The King's Romance =

1914 film

- Directed by: Ernest G. Batley
- Written by: May Austin (play); E.V. Edmonds (play)
- Starring: Fred Morgan; Ethel Bracewell; Henry Victor
- Production company: British and Colonial Films
- Distributed by: Kinematograph Trading Company
- Release date: July 1914
- Country: United Kingdom
- Languages: Silent; English intertitles

The King's Romance is a 1914 British silent adventure film directed by Ernest G. Batley and starring Fred Morgan, Ethel Bracewell and Henry Victor.

== Cast ==
- Fred Morgan as The Baron
- Ethel Bracewell as Vera
- Henry Victor as Prince Andreas
- George Foley as Dick
- Ethyle Batley as The Queen

== Bibliography ==
- Goble, Alan. The Complete Index to Literary Sources in Film. Walter de Gruyter, 1999.
