= Dorothy Batley =

British actor (1902–1983)

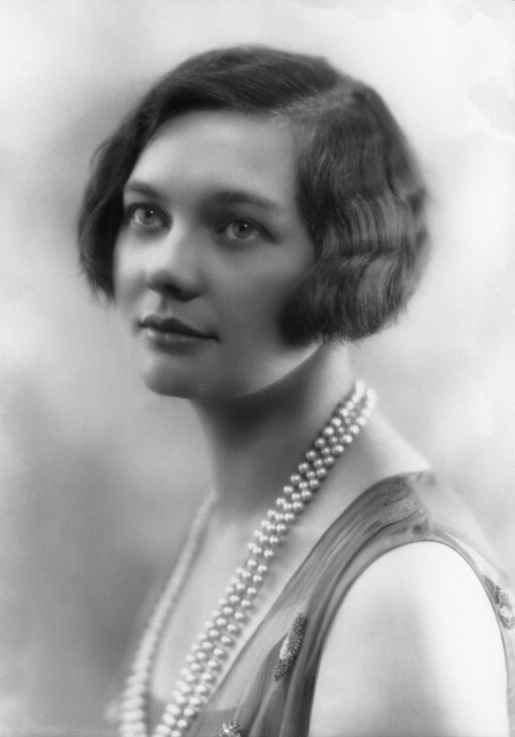
- Photographic portrait of Dorothy Batley, dated September 1927.
- Born: Dorothy Audrey Batley; 18 January 1902; Marylebone, London
- Died: 8 December 1983 (aged 81); Barnes, London
- Occupations: Stage and screen actress

Dorothy Batley (18 January 1902 – 8 December 1983) was a British actress of the stage and screen, with a notable period as a child actor in the period 1910 to 1916. Both her parents directed films in the period before and during World War I, often featuring Dorothy as the spirited and resourceful child heroine. As a young adult in the post-war years Batley worked as a theatre actress. In 1930 she married the film actor and director Guy Newall (his third marriage). The couple had a daughter, born in 1932, but her husband died in 1937. Batley had returned to the stage by 1941. She resumed her film career after 30 years when she was cast in minor roles in several motion pictures from 1949. From the late 1950s to the mid-1960s Batley was cast in a number of minor roles in a various television series.

== Biography ==
=== A child actor ===
Dorothy Audrey Batley was born on 18 January 1902 at Marylebone, London, the only child of Ernest Batley and Ethyle (née Murray). At the time of Dorothy's birth her parents were both theatre actors in touring companies, travelling between provincial theatres giving "performances of a standard repertoire".

Dorothy made her stage debut in 1908 at Folkestone in county Kent, aged six, when she played 'Little Willie' in East Lynne. She also played leading juvenile roles in provincial theatres in Nobody's Daughter, Within the Law, The House of Peril, The White Heather, Wanted a Husband and The Chinese Puzzle.

The Batleys were an established theatrical family by the time they became involved in the expanding British film industry in 1910. During that year Ernest Batley directed each of the three short films produced by H.B. English Films, including The Trail (released in July 1910) in which Dorothy played a child who hangs onto car driven by thieves and lays a trail of meal for the police. The Trail set the pattern, with Dorothy "as the plucky child heroine", for many of her film appearances as a child actor. Ernest wrote, directed and acted in three more short films for H.B. English Films, two comedies and a crime drama (each of them released in August 1912), with each film featuring Dorothy playing opposite her father.

Dorothy's mother, Ethyle Batley, made her directorial debut with the short film Peggy Gets Rid of the Baby for John Bull Films. The film, released in October 1912, was scripted by Ernest, with he and Dorothy in the acting roles. It was the first of a series of films featuring Dorothy in the role of "a mischievous child" named 'Peggy'. Advertisements for Peggy Gets Rid of the Baby advised exhibitors: "Peggy is a bright discovery in juvenile humorists... you will see more of her – she's sure to tickle your audiences". Of the three other 'Peggy' films for John Bull Films, each of them directed by Ethyle and released from November 1912 to May 1913, two were "mainly comedies". The third film Through the Flames was a drama in which 'Peggy' escapes from a burning house, set on fire by a murderous cousin, by climbing onto telegraph wires. The Cinema magazine described the scene as "a breathlessly exciting incident".

In June 1913 Dorothy's father Ernest was recruited by the British & Colonial Kinematograph Company (B&C) to play Napoleon in the landmark film The Battle of Waterloo. He decided to remain with the company to act and direct and was joined by Ethyle and Dorothy. Ernest Batley was appointed director in charge of B&C's open-air studio at Finchley in north London. Encouraged by the arrival of an established child actor in the person of eleven year-old Dorothy, the managing director of B&C John McDowell decided to actively produce drama films featuring child actors.

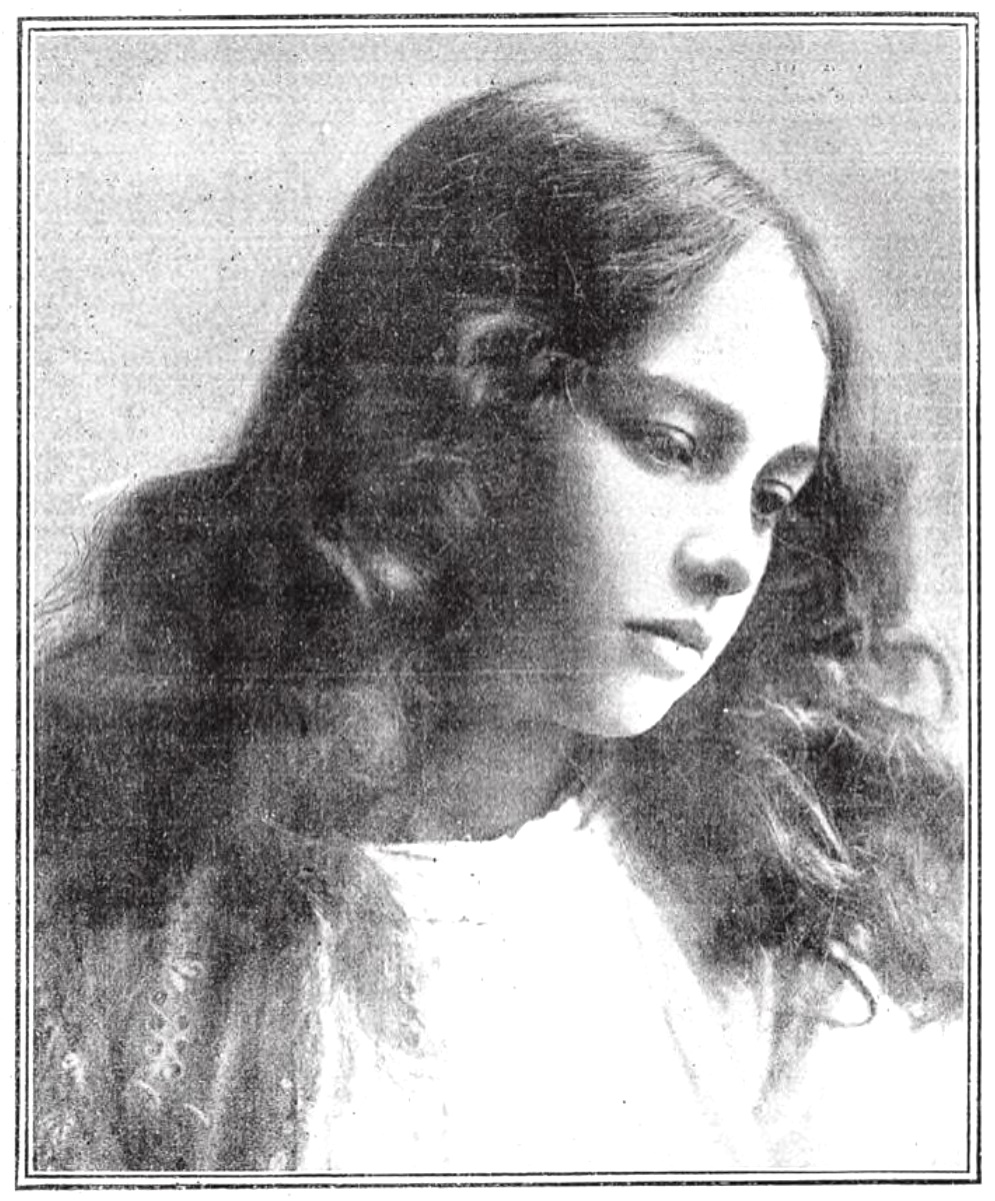
"A leading lady at eleven; Miss Dorothy Batley, the winsome child cinema actress"; published in The Picturegoer, 29 November 1913.

Dorothy Batley acted in sixteen films produced by the British & Colonial Kinematograph Company (B&C), each of them directed by one or other of her parents and released from October 1913 to November 1914. During that period she became one of B&C's leading personalities. One of Dorothy's earliest films for B&C was The Little Mother, directed by Ethyle; she played opposite Ernest as her on-screen father. In November 1913 the Picturegoer magazine featured Dorothy in a series of articles promoting female leads in films, in which she was described as "a 'star' actress". In her films for B&C Dorothy often acted opposite her father and frequently dressed as a boy, either as a girl in disguise or playing a boy's part. Ethyle Batley, who directed most of her B&C films, described her daughter's competence as an actor, observing that she needed little rehearsal and could comprehend "the essential idea of a character in an amazingly short time". Other children were also recruited to play roles in B&C productions. In 1914 Dorothy's mother was put in charge of the company's Juvenile Department where she was made responsible for the selection and training of child actors.

In August 1913 a mishap occurred during the filming of The Broken Chisel, directed by Charles Weston, on location at Broadstairs on the coast of Kent. Ernest Batley was playing an escaped convict rescuing a child, played by Dorothy, clinging to rocks by the sea. The cameraman, standing in a boat, was filming with his camera placed in the sand before him. A large wave hit the boat, pitched the cameraman overboard and knocked the camera into the water. The wave struck Ernest and Dorothy and dashed them against the rocks and then sucked them out to sea. They were eventually rescued in a small boat in an exhausted condition, Ernest suffering form severe cuts and bruises and Dorothy from shock. As a result of extensive publicity about the incident, The Broken Chisel became B&C's most successful film of the year. A short time afterwards, during the filming of the unreleased At the Hour of Twelve, Dorothy's leg was injured when she was dropped from the window of a burning building.

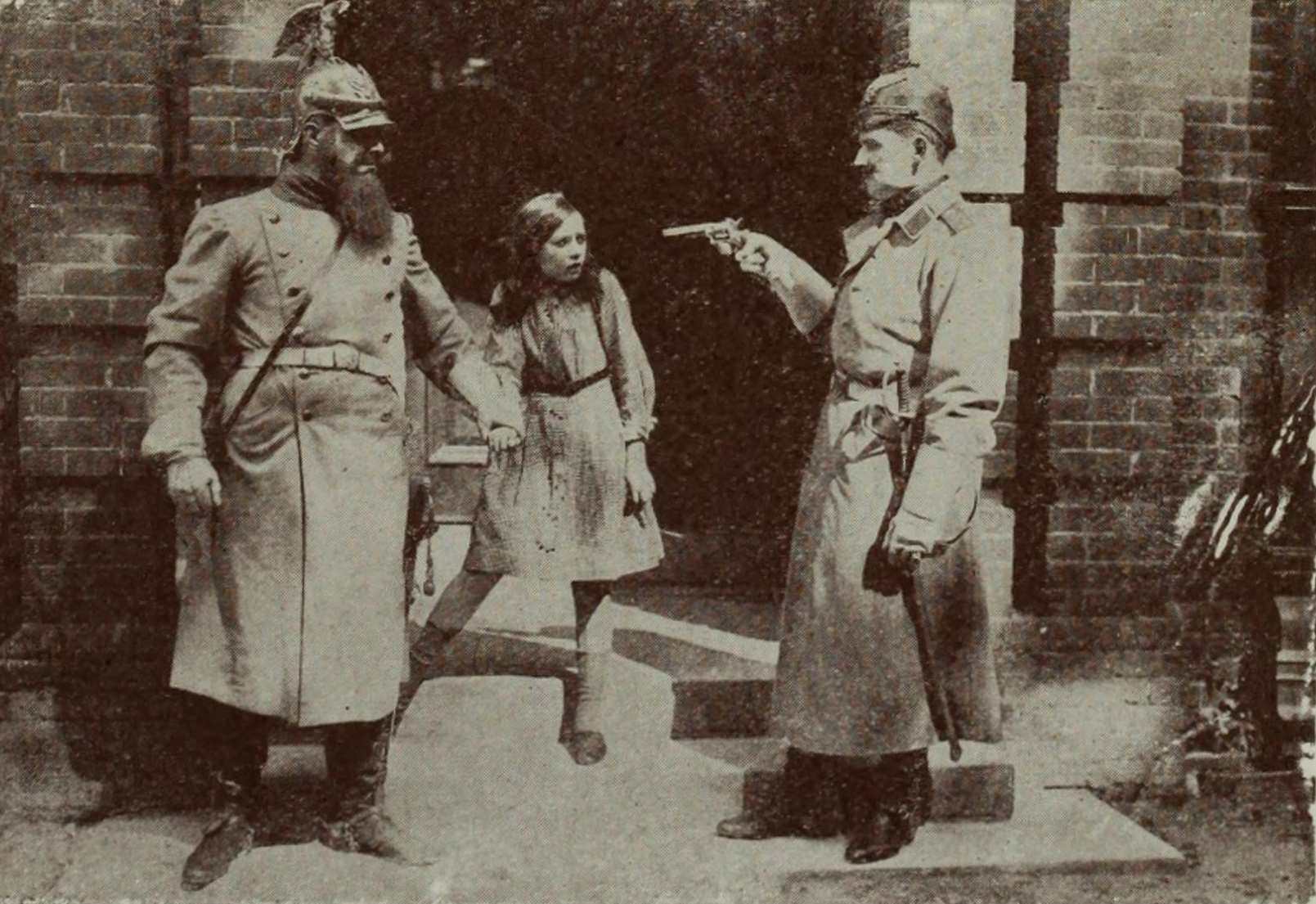
A still from An Englishman's Home (1914), published in Picture Stories Magazine, October 1914.

In June 1914 Dorothy's father was appointed director in charge of B&C's enclosed studio at Walthamstow in east London. After war was declared in August 1914 B&C focussed on patriotic themes in their films. Ernest directed and played a lead role in An Englishman's Home, a film about a foreign invasion based on the play by Guy du Maurier, with Dorothy as Ernest's on-screen daughter.

In October 1914 Ethyle and Dorothy Batley left B&C to join the Burlingham Standard production company, with Ernest following them there in January 1915. The company was managed by the American Frederick Burlingham, who was a successful cameraman and director of travel films, including highly popular mountaineering films. Burlingham wished to diversify into fiction films, for which purpose Ethyle was recruited. Ethyle's first film for Burlingham Standard was the patriotic One Shall Be Taken with Dorothy in the role of a soldier's daughter. The Batleys used a film studio at 115a Ebury Street, near Sloane Square in Belgravia, for their films produced during the war years. They produced films for Burlingham Standard and later for New Agency (which had been distributing the Burlingham Standard films). In about November 1915 the New Agency's production division changed its name to British Oak Films. Dorothy Batley appeared in thirteen films directed by either Ethyle or Ernest Batley during the war years up until late 1916, many of them with patriotic themes. The final film in that period was the patriotic Boys of the Old Brigade, produced in July and August 1916, in which Dorothy was cast as a crippled child. With a running time of one hour and twenty-three minutes, it was the longest film the Batleys had been involved in.

By early 1917 Dorothy's mother had become unwell. In late February it was reported she was "lying seriously ill in hospital". In April Ethyle Batley underwent "a very serious operation" at Chelsea Hospital and died on 22 April 1917, aged forty, of "cervical cancer and heart failure".

After the war had ended Ernest Batley directed Dorothy, then aged seventeen, in a four-reel drama The Sins of Youth for Central Films, released in June 1919 and described as a "domestic drama centring round an old farm", set amidst "the beautiful scenery of Buckinghamshire". This was Dorothy's last appearance in a motion picture until 1949.

=== Theatrical career ===
Dorothy Batley made her London theatrical debut at the Prince's Theatre in December 1920 as 'Ela Delahay' in Charley's Aunt. She continued in a series of theatrical roles in London theatres and touring companies during the period 1924 to early 1929.

Batley toured as 'Odile' in The Rat and played the same part at the Prince of Wales's Theatre in June 1924. In February 1925 she played 'Kathie' in Old Heidelberg at the Garrick Theatre in London's West End and toured as 'Julia Blue' in Down Hill later in 1925. In February 1926 Batley played 'Ruth Rendle' in The Mother at the Q Theatre in west London. In November 1926 she replaced Molly Kerr as 'the shingled lady' in Galsworthy's Escape at the Ambassadors Theatre. In February 1927 Batley again played 'Odile' in a revival of The Rat at the Prince of Wales' Theatre. During 1928 she toured as 'Lydia Webster' in The Baby Cyclone.

In May 1929 Batley joined a company of actors organised by Guy Newall for a tour of South Africa. Newall had been a popular British screen actor and director in the post-war years to the early 1920s, in a series of films playing opposite Ivy Duke (whom he married in November 1922). By the mid- to late-1920s, with a general downturn in the British film industry, due to heavy competition from the United States, Newall was performing in theatrical productions and occasional film roles. He and Ivy Duke had divorced by 1929. During the tour of South Africa with Newall's company Batley performed the female lead in the plays Just Married, When the Blue Hills Laughed and 77 Park Lane.

After their return from South Africa, Guy Newall and Dorothy Batley were married in June 1930 in the Hampstead Registry Office in London. The couple had a daughter named Susan, born on 19 July 1932 at Eton in Buckinghamshire.

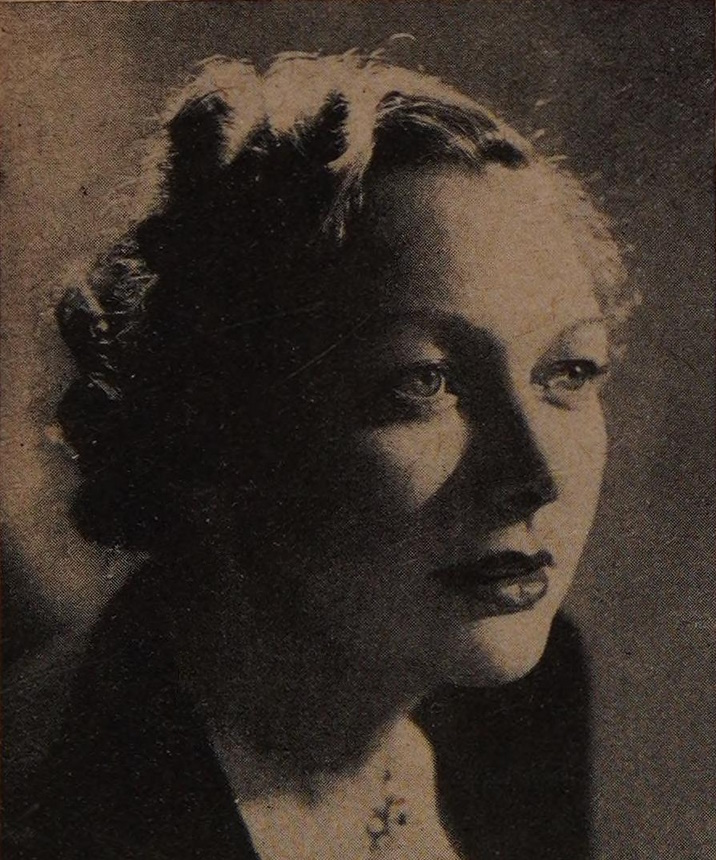
Portrait of Dorothy Batley, published in Theatre World, March 1943.

In 1927 the British parliament had passed the Cinematograph Films Act, which came into force in April 1928. The Act, intended as a counter to the perceived economic and cultural dominance of Hollywood films, imposed a minimum quota of British films to be shown in British cinemas. One of the consequences of the legislation was the proliferation of inexpensive productions in order for distributors and exhibitors to conform to the legal requirements of the Act. The low-budget British-made films, usually shown as a supporting movie to the featured film, became known as 'quota quickies'. These films were often looked upon with disdain and considered to be cheap and tawdry. The Cinematograph Films Act coincided with the advent of the sound film, which within a short space of time replaced the silent film in British cinemas. Guy Newall's screen career was briefly revitalised by the advent of 'quota quickies'. In the early 1930s he was cast in several films and then worked as a director for Julius Hagen at Twickenham Studios in west London, followed by several more acting roles.

During 1931 Batley toured as 'Anne' in the play Never Say Die.

In September 1934 Batley was a cast-member in Murder in Mayfair at the Globe Theatre. During the 1930s Batley played in Murder in Mayfair at Drury Lane, followed by "the long run" of Crest of the Wave.

Guy Newall's health began to deteriorate in the mid-1930s and on 25 February 1937 he died at his home at Hampstead, aged 51.

From July 1941 Dorothy Batley appeared as 'Ella Spender' in Esther McCracken's Quiet Weekend, which had a successful run at Wyndham's Theatre in London's West End. The play opened in July 1941 and closed in January 1944.

=== Return to the screen ===
From 1949 to 1951 Batley was cast in minor roles, or bit parts, in three motion pictures. She was cast in The Blue Lagoon, released in March 1949, as the yachtsman's wife. In 1950 she played the role of 'Pauline Drauffer' in The Angel with the Trumpet and in 1951 as 'Nurse West' in the Hammer Films drama The Rossiter Case.^{[A]}

In November 1951 Batley was a cast-member in the Noël Coward's "light comedy", Relative Values, at London's Savoy Theatre.

In the period 1959 to 1966 Batley was cast in a number of minor roles, in mostly single episodes, in ten different television series produced by Granada Television, Associated Television and Rediffusion.

In March 1964 Batley was a cast-member of the comedy Mother's Boy, produced at the Globe Theatre in London.

Dorothy Batley died on 8 December 1983 in Barnes, London.

== Filmography ==
- The Trail (July 1910), H.B. English Films
- A Child's Strategy (August 1912), H.B. English Films
- Kleptomania Tablets (August 1912), H.B. English Films
- The Heavenly Twins (August 1912), H.B. English Films
- Peggy Gets Rid of the Baby (October 1912), John Bull Films
- Peggy Becomes a Boy Scout (November 1912), John Bull Films
- Through the Flames (February 1913), John Bull Films
- Peggy as Peacemaker (May 1913), John Bull Films
- The Little Mother (October 1913), British & Colonial Kinematograph Company
- The Broken Chisel (October 1913) (US release: Escape from Broadmoor), British & Colonial Kinematograph Company
- At the Hour of Twelve (unreleased), British & Colonial Kinematograph Company
- The Two Father Christmasses (November 1913), British & Colonial Kinematograph Company
- To Save Her Dad (December 1913), British & Colonial Kinematograph Company; directed by Charles Weston
- Three Little Orphans (January 1914), British & Colonial Kinematograph Company
- The Tattooed Will (February 1914), British & Colonial Kinematograph Company
- A Little Child Shall Lead Them (March 1914), British & Colonial Kinematograph Company
- The Master Crook Outwitted by a Child (March 1914), British & Colonial Kinematograph Company
- Retribution (March 1914), British & Colonial Kinematograph Company
- Peggy's New Papa (March 1914), British & Colonial Kinematograph Company
- Out of Evil Cometh Good (April 1914), British & Colonial Kinematograph Company
- The Drawn Blind (May 1914), British & Colonial Kinematograph Company
- The Old Old Story (June 1914), British & Colonial Kinematograph Company
- The Girl Boy Scout (September 1914), British & Colonial Kinematograph Company
- An Englishman's Home (September 1914), British & Colonial Kinematograph Company
- One Shall Be Taken (October 1914), Burlingham Standard
- Christmas Without Daddy (November 1914), British & Colonial Kinematograph Company
- War Is Hell (March 1915), Burlingham Standard
- Bulldog Grit (April 1915), Burlingham Standard
- Remember Belgium (July 1915), Burlingham Standard
- A Justifiable Deception (August 1915), New Agency
- A Child of the Streets (September 1915), New Agency
- Across the Wires (September 1915), New Agency
- Falsely Accused (October 1915), British Oak
- Nursery Rhymes (November 1915), British Oak
- Those Children! (December 1915), British Oak
- The Great Red War (January 1916), British Oak
- Boys of the Old Brigade (December 1916), British Oak
- The Sins of Youth (June 1919), Central Films

- The Blue Lagoon (May 1949), Individual Pictures
- The Angel with the Trumpet (March 1950), London Film Productions
- The Rossiter Case (January 1951), Hammer Films
- Blue Murder at St. Trinian's (December 1957), John Harvel Productions

Television series

- Skyport (1959), Granada Television (one episode)
- Probation Officer (1959), Granada Television (one episode)
- Emergency Ward 10 (1957), Associated Television (ATV) (one episode)
- Deadline Midnight (1960), Associated Television (ATV) (one episode)
- Top Secret (1961), Associated-Rediffusion Television (one episode)
- Call Oxbridge 2000 (1961), Associated Television (ATV) (one episode)
- Harpers West One (1961), Associated Television (ATV) (two episodes)
- It Happened Like This (1963), Rediffusion (one episode)
- ITV Play of the Week (1963; 1965), Granada Television (two episodes)
- Mrs. Thursday (1966), Associated Television (ATV) (one episode)

== Notes ==
A.The details of Dorothy Batley's screen career has been noted in reference books for the period of three decades between her appearances on the screen. After her appearance in The Sins of Youth in 1919, aged 17, her next movie role was 30 years later in The Blue Lagoon, released in 1949.
