= Janet Alexander =

British actress (1878–1961)

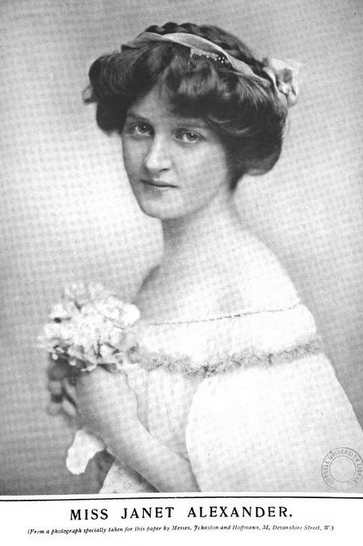
Janet Alexander, from a 1904 publication.

Janet Alexander (16 July 1878 in Ewell, Surrey, England, UK – 28 June 1961 in Kensington, London, England, UK) was a British actress.

Born as Kate Janet Alexander, she was the daughter of schoolmaster Charles Dallas Alexander and Helen Kate née Shuldham. She was married to the actor Lauderdale Maitland from 1907 to his death in 1929. Secondly, she was briefly married to the writer and editor Sir John Alexander Hammerton from February 1949 to his death in May of the same year.

In 1901 she appeared at the Imperial Theatre in London as Kate Meredith in Boyle Lawrence's military drama A Man of His Word opposite H. B. Irving.

== Selected filmography ==
- The Secret Woman (1918)
- Queen's Evidence (1919)
- God's Clay (1919)
- The Hour of Trial (1920)
- Henrietta Maria; or, The Queen of Sorrow (1923)
- Empress Josephine; Or, Wife of a Demigod (1923)
- Not Quite a Lady (1928)
- High Seas (1929)
- The Compulsory Husband (1930)
- No Exit (1930)
