= The Taming of the Shrew (1929 film) =

1929 film

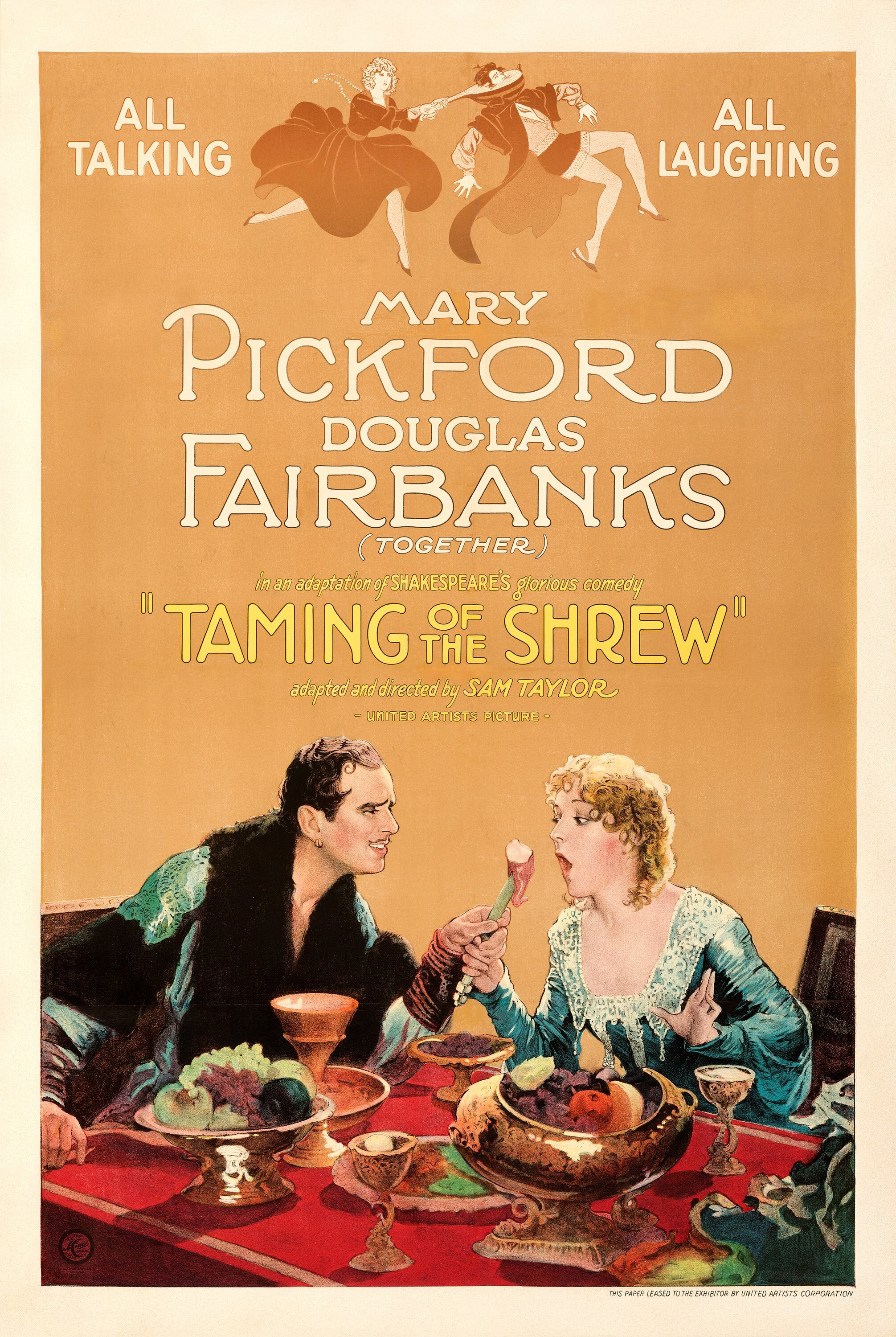
- Poster
- Directed by: Sam Taylor
- Written by: William Shakespeare (play); Sam Taylor (adaptation)
- Produced by: Mary Pickford
- Starring: Mary Pickford; Douglas Fairbanks
- Cinematography: Karl Struss
- Edited by: Allen McNeil
- Music by: Hugo Riesenfeld
- Production companies: Pickford Corporation; Elton Corporation
- Distributed by: United Artists
- Release date: October 26, 1929
- Running time: 63–66 minutes
- Country: United States
- Language: English

The Taming of the Shrew is a 1929 American pre-Code comedy film directed by Sam Taylor and starring Mary Pickford and her husband Douglas Fairbanks. It was the first sound film adaptation of the Shakespearean play of the same name. The film was adapted by Taylor from William Shakespeare's play.

The film's original copyright was not renewed, but a revised version was published in 1966 with a copyright notice and registration. While the original version is public domain, the revised version is not. (Note: Notice for the 1966 version)

== Cast ==
- Mary Pickford as Katherina
- Douglas Fairbanks as Petruchio
- Edwin Maxwell as Baptista
- Joseph Cawthorn as Gremio
- Clyde Cook as Grumio
- Geoffrey Wardwell as Hortensio
- Dorothy Jordan as Bianca

== Production ==
The first sound version of the play on film, this version was planned as a sound film from the start. Pickford had already made her sound film debut in Coquette (1929) so The Taming of the Shrew marked her second talkie. This version of the film is primarily known for how Pickford delivers Katherina's last speech. As she moves through the litany of reasons why a woman should obey her husband, she winks toward Bianca, unseen by Petruchio. Bianca smiles in silent communication with Katherina, thus acknowledging that Katherina has not been tamed at all. Pickford and Fairbanks' marriage was breaking down even before filming began, and animosity between the couple increased during filming. In later years, Pickford stated that working on the film was the worst experience of her life, although she also acknowledged that Fairbanks' performance was one of his best.

For many years it was believed that one of the credits read "Additional Dialogue by Sam Taylor", but there is no evidence any print ever contained such a credit and experts on Shakespeare films, such as Kenneth S. Rothwell and Robert Hamilton Ball, think it unlikely.

== Reception ==
Fairbanks biographer Jeffrey Vance, writing in 2008, believes "Taming of the Shrew has never received the recognition it deserves as the first talking film of a Shakespeare play. It was not only technically superior to the majority of talking pictures in 1929 but would unquestionably be the finest translation onto film of Shakespeare for some time to come." Vance also sees the film as a window into the Pickford-Fairbanks marriage: "As a reenactment of the Pickford-Fairbanks marriage, Taming of the Shrew continues to fascinate as a rather grim comedy. The two willful, larger-than-life personalities working at cross-purposes and conveying their resentment and frustration to each other through blatant one-upmanship and harsh wounds is both the movie and the marital union."

Leonard Maltin described the film as "defeated by its lack of pacing and downright embarrassing performances, though it's undeniably fascinating to see Doug and Mary together in their only co-starring appearance. This is the film with the infamous credit, 'By William Shakespeare, with additional dialogue by Sam Taylor.'"

== Home media ==
After many years out of circulation, the film was re-released in 1966 in a new cut supervised by Pickford herself. New sound effects and music were added throughout, much of the voice dubbing was enhanced with newly available technology, and seven minutes were cut from the initial print. This re-released version is the only version now available on DVD or VHS.

== See also ==
- List of early sound feature films (1926–1929)
- The Taming of the Shrew on screen

== Bibliography ==
- Rothwell, Kenneth S. (2004). A History of Shakespeare on Screen: A Century of Film and Television. Cambridge: Cambridge University Press. ISBN 978-0-521-54311-8.
- Tibbetts, John C.; Welsh, James M. (2014). Douglas Fairbanks and the American Century. Jackson: University Press of Mississippi. ISBN 978-1-62846-006-3.
- Vance, Jeffrey; Maietta, Tony (2008). Douglas Fairbanks. Berkeley: University of California Press. ISBN 978-0-520-25667-5.
