= The Right to Strike =

1923 film

- Directed by: Fred Paul
- Written by: Ernest Hutchinson (play); Walter Summers
- Produced by: G.B. Samuelson
- Starring: Lillian Hall-Davis; Campbell Gullan; Fred Paul; Lauderdale Maitland
- Production company: British-Super Films
- Distributed by: Jury Films
- Release date: January 1923
- Country: United Kingdom
- Language: English

The Right to Strike is a 1923 British silent drama film directed by Fred Paul and starring Lillian Hall-Davis, Fred Paul and Campbell Gullan. It was based on a play by Ernest Hutchinson.

== Cast ==
- Lillian Hall-Davis as Mrs. Ormerod
- Fred Paul as Dr. Wrigley
- Campbell Gullan as Montague
- Lauderdale Maitland as Ben Ormerod
- Olaf Hytten

== Bibliography ==
- Bamford, Kenton. Distorted Images: British National Identity and Film in the 1920s. I.B. Tauris, 1999.
