= Queen's Evidence (film) =

1919 British film by James Mackay

- Directed by: James Mackay
- Based on: Adam and Eve by: C.E. Munro; Louisa Parr
- Release date: 1919
- Country: United Kingdom
- Language: Silent

Queen's Evidence is a 1919 British silent adventure film directed by James Mackay and starring Godfrey Tearle, Unity More and Janet Alexander. It was based on the play Adam and Eve by C.E. Munro and Louisa Parr. A smuggler tries to blame his brother when the coast guard begins closing in on him.

== Cast ==
- Godfrey Tearle as Adam Pascal
- Unity More as Eve Pascall
- Janet Alexander as Joan Hocking
- Lauderdale Maitland as Jerrem
- Edward Sorley as Jonathan
- Bruce Winston as Job
- Pardoe Woodman as Reuben May
- Ada King
