= Ivanhoe (1913 British film) =

1913 film by Leedham Bantock

Ivanhoe is a 1913 British silent historical film directed by Leedham Bantock and starring Lauderdale Maitland, Ethel Bracewell and Nancy Bevington. It is based on the 1819 novel Ivanhoe by Sir Walter Scott.

A separate American adaptation Ivanhoe was released the same year.

== Cast ==
- Lauderdale Maitland - Ivanhoe
- Ethel Bracewell - Rebecca
- Nancy Bevington - Lady Rowena
- Hubert Carter - Isaac
- Harry Lonsdale - Sir Brian
- Austin Milroy - Front de Boeuf
