= The Rossiter Case =

1951 British film by Francis Searle

- Directed by: Francis Searle
- Screenplay by: John Hunter; Francis Searle
- Based on: The Rossiters (play) by Kenneth Hyde
- Produced by: Anthony Hinds
- Starring: Helen Shingler; Clement McCallin; Sheila Burrell
- Cinematography: Walter J. Harvey
- Edited by: John Ferris
- Music by: Frank Spencer
- Production company: Hammer Film Productions
- Distributed by: Exclusive Films (UK)
- Release date: 21 January 1951 (UK)
- Running time: 75 minutes
- Country: United Kingdom
- Language: English

The Rossiter Case is a 1951 British second feature ('B') crime film directed by Francis Searle and starring Helen Shingler, Clement McCallin, Sheila Burrell and Stanley Baker in a small role. It was written by John Hunter and Searle based on Kenneth Hyde's 1947 play The Rossiters. Production ran from 22 May 1950 to 9 June. It was released on 21 January 1951. The film is unlisted in film guides and was previously considered a lost film; however, it was shown on Talking Pictures TV in 2025.

== Plot ==
Peter Rossiter's wife Liz is paralyzed from a car accident caused by her own pulling of the car's steering wheel. He has an affair with his calculating sister-in-law, Honor, who ruthlessly pursues him. She is the widow of his brother, Christopher, whose life, it is strongly suggested, was made miserable by Honor throughout their marriage. Honor lies to Peter about her being pregnant. She repeats the lie to Liz, with whom she argues; they struggle, and Liz reaches for the gun an apprehensive Honor had taken out earlier when Liz's maid had knocked at the door late at night; the gun goes off, killing Honor. The police find Peter's gun by the body, and he becomes their number one murder suspect. Because he was recovering from drunkenness at the approximate time of the shooting, he cannot exactly account for his movements. Liz describes the struggle and the shooting to Peter, but he decides to say nothing of it to the Divisional Inspector who has called to interview him. Liz decides to confess to save him from any suspicion. She is seen entering the room, having miraculously found the strength to rise from her wheelchair to protect the man she still loves. We are left to assume that the verdict shall be manslaughter, as they are seen holding each other walking towards the Inspector.

== Cast ==
- Helen Shingler as Liz Rossiter
- Clement McCallin as Peter Rossiter
- Sheila Burrell as Honor
- Frederick Leister as Sir James Ferguson
- Ann Codrington as Marty
- Henry Edwards as Doctor Bendix
- Dorothy Batley as Nurse West
- Gabrielle Blunt as Alice
- Stanley Baker as Joe
- Eleanor Bryan as Agnes
- Ewen Solon as Inspector
- Robert Percival as Sergeant
- Dennis Castle as Constable
- Frederic Steger as Hobson
- Anthony Allen as Arthur

== Reception ==
The Monthly Film Bulletin wrote: "This melodrama, adapted from a stage play, has been almost literally translated to the screen. The result is a film artificial in presentation, and weighed down by dialogue."

Picture Show wrote: "Competently acted and directed."

The Daily Film Renter wrote: "Both the leading and supporting roles are acted in really true-to-life style, and the picture remains traditionally British in character."

Picturegoer wrote: "Both Helen Shingler and Clement McCallin have achieved considerable success on television in recent months. This, their first screen appearance after a long absence, will, unfortunately, not enhance their names with picturegoers. Neither is able to inject sufficient dramatic quality into this tale. The story, though it has its moments, is far too long."
