= Not Quite a Lady =

1928 film directed by Thomas Bentley

- Directed by: Thomas Bentley
- Written by: Eliot Stannard
- Starring: Mabel Poulton; Janet Alexander; Barbara Gott; Maurice Braddell
- Production company: British International Pictures
- Distributed by: Wardour Films
- Release date: 25 July 1928
- Running time: 87 minutes
- Country: United Kingdom
- Language: English

Not Quite a Lady is a 1928 British silent comedy film directed by Thomas Bentley and starring Mabel Poulton, Janet Alexander and Barbara Gott. The screenplay concerns a wealthy woman who, unhappy with her son's choice of fiancée, holds a boring house party to try to put her off marrying into the family.

== Cast ==
- Mabel Poulton – Ethel Borridge
- Janet Alexander – Mrs.Cassilis
- Barbara Gott – Mrs. Borridge
- Maurice Braddell – Geoffrey Cassilis
- Dorothy Bartlam – Mabel Marchmont
- George Bellamy – Maj. Warrington
- Gibb McLaughlin – The Vicar
- Sam Wilkinson – Mr. Borridge
