= Merry-Go-Round (1923 film) =

1923 film

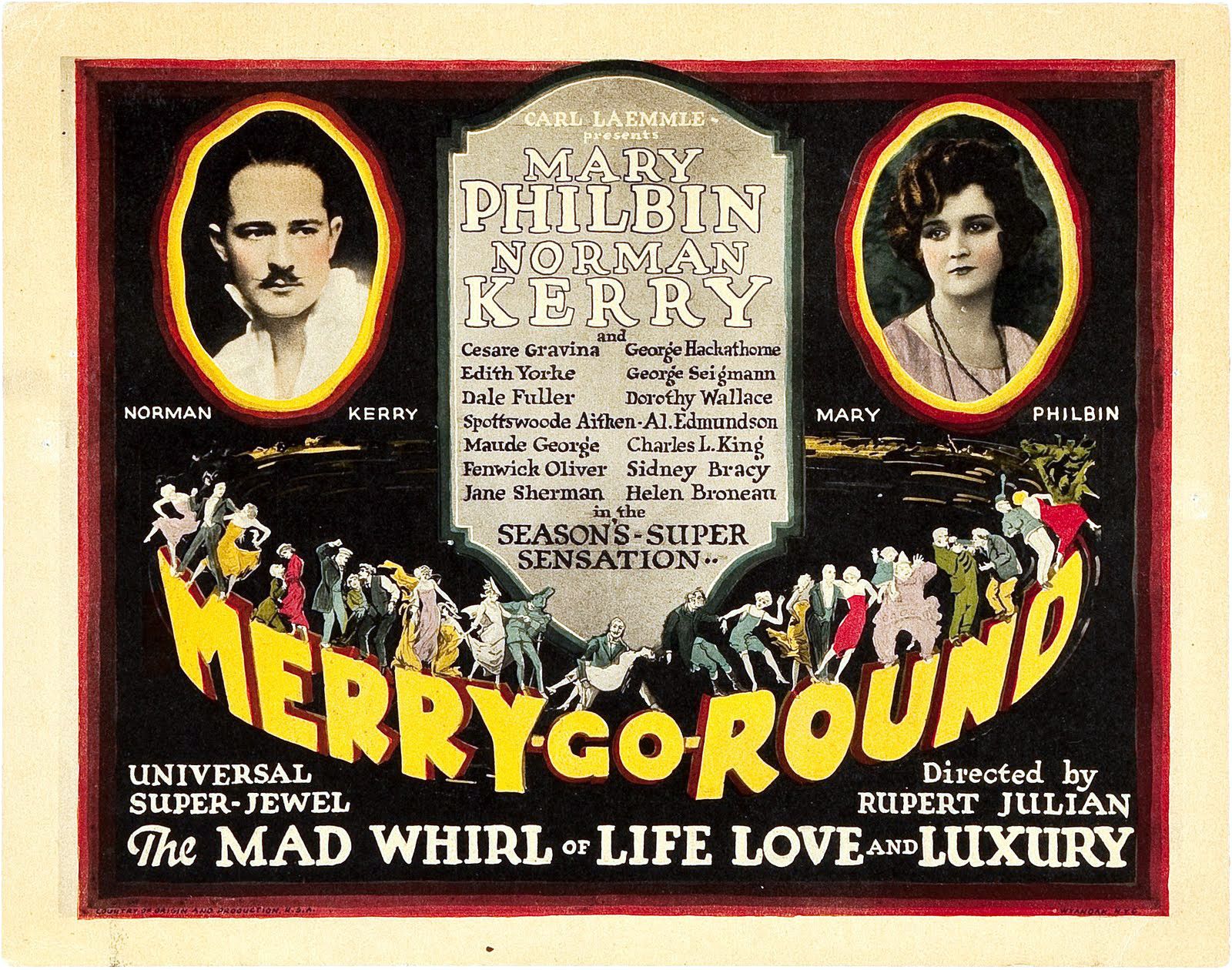
- Lobby card
- Directed by: Erich von Stroheim; Rupert Julian
- Written by: Finis Fox (scenario); Irving Thalberg (scenario); Rupert Julian (scenario); Erich von Stroheim (scenario)
- Story by: Harvey Gates
- Produced by: Carl Laemmle
- Starring: Norman Kerry; Mary Philbin; Edith Yorke; Dale Fuller
- Cinematography: Charles Kaufman; William H. Daniels; Ben Reynolds
- Edited by: James C. McKay
- Distributed by: Universal Pictures
- Release date: September 3, 1923
- Running time: 110 minutes
- Country: United States
- Language: Silent (English intertitles)

Merry-Go-Round (1923)

Merry-Go-Round is a 1923 American feature film directed by Erich von Stroheim (uncredited) and Rupert Julian, starring Norman Kerry and Mary Philbin, and released by Universal Pictures. A copy of the film is held in a collection and it has been released on DVD.

== Plot ==
As described in a film magazine, Count Franz Maxmilian, a happy-go-lucky, irresponsible count, is attached to the Austrian court of Emperor Francis Joseph and by the Emperor's mandate is affianced to Gisella, the daughter of the Minister of War and a woman he does not love. Having by chance met the innocent little organ-grinder Agnes, a peasant toiling in Vienna's amusement park, representing a type of womanhood with which he is totally unfamiliar, he experiences a strong attraction. By the dictates of court etiquette, the hated union is solemnized. The organ-grinder, not knowing that the admirer is a member of royalty, believes he has deserted her. War is declared, and the unhappy remorse-stricken count goes to the front. During hostilities, his unloved royal spouse dies. The count later returns, renounces his title, and marries the little organ-grinder.

== Cast ==
- Norman Kerry as Count Franz Maxmilian Von Hohenegg
- Mary Philbin as Agnes Urban
- George Siegmann as Schani Huber
- Dale Fuller as Marianka Huber
- Cesare Gravina as Sylvester Urban
- Edith Yorke as Ursula Urban
- George Hackathorne as Bartholomew Gruber
- Al Edmundson as Nepomuck Navrital, the Count's manservant
- Spottiswoode Aitken as Minister of War / Gisella's Father
- Dorothy Wallace as Countess Gisella Von Steinbruck
- Albert Edmondson as Nepomuck Navrital (credited as Al Edmondson)
- Albert Conti as Rudi / Baron von Leightsinn
- Charles King as Nicki (credited as Charles L. King)
- Fenwick Oliver as Eitel
- Sidney Bracey as Gisella's Groom
- Anton Vaverka as Emperor Francis Joseph
- Maude George as Madame Elvira
- Helen Broneau as Jane
- Jane Sherman as Maria
- Gene Roth as Guard (credited as Eugene H. Roth)
- Sadie Campbell as Crying Girl - Clown Scene (uncredited)
- Tommy Hicks as Fat Boy - Clown Scene (uncredited)
- Ella McKenzie as Crying Fat Girl - Clown Scene (uncredited)
- Jack Murphy as Boy in Crowd - Clown Scene (uncredited)
- Rolfe Sedan as Minor Role (uncredited)

== Pre-Production ==
Paul Kohner, Universal's manager for overseas publicity approached von Stroheim following the success of Blind Husbands (1919) with several proposals for the director's next project. The 20-year-old Kohner, a highly literate and sophisticated Bavarian émigré shared a nostalgia for Europe with the working-class von Stroheim. The topic of pre-war Vienna stirred von Stroheim's memories of his childhood and youth. A story began to take shape with the central themes built around the Prater, Vienna's world-famous amusement park and its main attraction, the Merry-Go-Round, from which the film's title is taken.

Producer Irving Thalberg encouraged von Stroheim to proceed with writing the script, but with a caveat fully establishing Thalberg's oversight: von Stroheim was not to be part of the cast in the production, a condition that would provide Thalberg and Universal with the option of replacing von Stroheim as director in the midst of filming, without the expense of recasting and reshooting his character. Von Stroheim and his agent consented to this provision reluctantly.

Thalberg carefully vetted von Stroheim's screenplay submissions, ultimately paying the director $5,000 for the collaboratively written scenario. In order to circumvent von Stroheim's excessive use of film stock in a script calling for almost one thousand scenes, Thalberg insisted that each scene be limited by pre-timed estimates in continuity, to ensure the picture emerged at “an acceptable length.”

== Production ==
Merry-Go-Round went into production on 25 August 1922. On 6 October 1922, after six weeks, Universal removed director Von Stroheim from the project and immediately replaced him with director Rupert Julian. Shooting was completed on 8 January 1923.

The production, from the beginning, was fraught with internecine struggles pitting Universal executives against Von Stroheim and his technical assistants over content, scheduling and budgetary control of the film. Universal unit production manager for the film, James Winnard Hum, serving as proxy for head of production Thalberg, was daily on the set and in direct communication with Von Stroheim and his advisors. Mutual recriminations and accusations of bad faith abounded on both sides. Von Stroheim cultivated a “them vs. us” atmosphere among his staff and workers, most of whom were loyalists enlisted from his recently completed Foolish Wives. Production manager Hum felt that von Stroheim was “stalling” on portions of the filming in order to assert his control over the shooting schedule.

Von Stroheim felt confident that an appeal to Universal president Carl Laemmle would resolve the matter in his favor, curbing Thalberg's authority, an expectation of which he was quickly disabused. After a number of delays in filming, including the derailment of a prop streetcar, the overloading of the studio electrical system due to excessive night shooting, an inebriated lead man (Norman Kerry), the general disaffection of the extras, and delays caused by a search for an appropriate orangutan, the upper echelon at Universal mobilized against von Stroheim. Thalberg was authorized to terminate von Stroheim as director. Biographer Richard Koszarski offers an excerpt from Thalberg's notification to von Stroheim:

“The fact that more productions have not been completed is due largely to your totally inexcusable and repeated acts of insubordination, your extravagant ideas which you have been unwilling to sacrifice in the slightest particular, repeated an unnecessary delays occasioned by your attitude in arguing against practically every instruction that has been given you in good faith, and by your apparent idea that you are greater and more powerful than the organization that employs you...you have time and again demonstrated your disloyalty to our company, encouraged and fostered discontent, distrust and disrespect in the minds of your fellow employees, and have attempted to create an organization loyal to yourself, rather than the company you are employed to serve...”

Upon von Stroheim's departure, Universal instantly replaced him with Rupert Julian. The production proceeded with most of von Stroheim's crew and cast intact but some expressions of discontent at von Stroheim's departure.

The question as to the relative contributions to Merry-Go-Round from von Stroheim and Julian remain in dispute. Based on testimony by Hum, Louis Germonprez (von Stroheim's business manager) and von Stroheim agreed that about a third of the scenes had been completed by von Stroheim. Thalberg and Julian reported that about 25 percent had been completed (271 scenes). Though Julian's contribution appears to have closely followed the original script, few of the von Stroheim-directed scenes were incorporated into the picture.

== Theme ==
Merry-Go-Round represents the earliest appearance of a female protagonist as the center of interest in a von Stroheim film, a significant departure from the centrality of the male Prussian officer and pseudo-aristocrat that von Stroheim himself had made infamous as “the man you love to hate.” Though not fully realized in this film, his “tentative shift in focus from the seducer to the victim marks a new phase in von Stroheim’s career.” The character of Count Maximilian (Norman Kerry) is presented as less a caricature of a nobleman than an individual capable of “dramatic maturation”, another shift that distinguishes Merry-Go-Round. Heroine Agnes Urban's (Mary Philbin) emotional struggles are examined with empathy, marking the first time von Stroheim creates “a dramatically successful female, an indication of a general shift in his interest.”

Von Stroheim's nostalgic recreation of Vienna's Belle Époque serves as a sentimental tribute to the Habsburg monarchy and its ancien regime, both of which suffered social and economic collapse during World War I. Despite acknowledging the decadence and abuses of the Austrian ruling class, Merry-Go-Round presents their decline and fall with regret.

Von Stroheim's obsession with “minute details and rituals” reveals more than von Stroheim's concern with the precise cinematic depiction of props, but a tribute to Austrian aristocratic social order, whose military echelon he portrayed with dignity and fidelity. Von Stroheim arranged for the transportation of the original royal carriage of the deceased Emperor Franz Joseph to Hollywood for use in the film. More than a relic from the Habsburg dynasty, it serves as a tribute to the lost Austrian Empire.

== Reception ==
Despite the fact that von Stroheim's name had been expunged from the credits, viewers who attended the premiere at New York's Rivoli Theater were well aware that he had conceived, if not executed, Merry-Go-Round. Reviews were mixed, but the picture was ranked the year's second best film by The Film Daily.

The film was the eighth most successful that year at the box office in the United States and Canada.

== Sources ==
- Kindley, 2009. Merry-Go-Round: Rupert Julian and Erich von Stroheim. Image Entertainment DVD. http://www.notcoming.com/reviews/merrygoround Retrieved 30 August 2020
- Koszarski, Richard. 1983. The Man You Loved to Hate: Erich von Stroheim and Hollywood. Oxford University Press. ISBN 0-19-503239-X
