= Maurice Braddell =

British actor (1900–1990)

- Picturegoer postcard
- Born: Maurice Lee Braddell; 23 November 1900; Folkestone, Kent, England
- Died: 28 July 1990 (aged 89); Ashford, Kent, England
- Occupations: Actor; author; art restorer

Maurice Lee Braddell (23 November 1900 – 28 July 1990) was an English actor, author and art restorer.

Maurice Braddell was born in Folkestone, Kent, England, and lived in New York City for much of his life. He was the son of Sir Thomas Braddell and Lady Violet Nassau (Kirby) Braddell. The Braddell family had a long association with the Straits Settlements (Singapore) where they served as lawyers and judges. Maurice Braddell married Jean Shannon (Macleod) Harman of Chesham, Bucks who had previously taken the name Braddell. As well as acting in both silent films and talkies, Braddell wrote the 1935 farce of the same name on which the 1936 film, It's You I Want is based.

Over 40 years later, he was retired from films and working as an art restorer, living in New York's East Village, when he was cast in Andy Warhol's 1968 film, Flesh.

== Filmography ==
=== Actor ===
Year	Title	Role	Notes
1928	A Window in Piccadilly	Harry	
1928	Dawn	British Airman	
1928	Not Quite a Lady	Geoffrey Cassilis	
1929	Master and Man	Dick Waring	
1929	Latin Quarter	Mario	
1930	The School for Scandal	Careless	
1931	Her Reputation	Eric Sloane	
1932	Men of Tomorrow	Allan Shepherd	
1936	Things to Come	Dr. Harding	
1968	Flesh	The Artist	
1971	Women in Revolt	Candy's Father	(final film role)

=== Screenwriter ===
- Love, Life and Laughter (1934)
