= Clement McCallin =

British actor (1913–1977)

- Born: Clement Schuyler McCallin; 6 March 1913; London, England
- Died: 7 August 1977 (aged 64); Stratford-upon-Avon, Warwickshire, England
- Education: RADA
- Occupation: Actor
- Spouses: Phillippa Gurney (m. 1946) Brenda Bruce (m. 1970)
- Children: 3

Clement Schuyler McCallin (6 March 1913 – 7 August 1977) was a British actor from London. RADA trained, he made his stage debut in 1931, and worked extensively with the RSC and The Old Vic. He was married to actress Brenda Bruce, with whom he adopted a son. He was her second husband, and predeceased her, dying in 1977 in Stratford-upon-Avon, from undisclosed causes.

== Selected filmography ==
- Stolen Life (1939) - Karal Anderson
- Edward, My Son (1949) - Sergeant Kenyon
- The Queen of Spades (1949) - Officer in the gaming room
- Murder in the Cathedral (1951) - 2nd Priest - prior
- The Rossiter Case (1951) - Peter Rossiter
- The Lady with a Lamp (1951) - Richard M. Milnes
- Cry, the Beloved Country (1951) - First reporter (uncredited)
- The Story of Robin Hood and His Merrie Men (1952) - Earl of Huntingdon
- Folly to Be Wise (1952) - Colonel (uncredited)
- Rough Shoot (1953) - Inspector Sullivan
- Beau Brummell (1954) - Footman (uncredited)
- Happy Deathday (1968) - Prof. Esteban Zoltan
