= Zenith Film Company =

British film studio

Zenith Film Company, also known as Zenith Films, was a British film studio. It released adaptations of successful theatrical shows.

Seymour Hicks was in its 1913 Scrooge film.

Leedham Bantock was a director at the studio.

Billy Quirk and Peggy Shaw were contracted for a series of two-reel comedies at the studio.

The company announced plans to make the films Garrick and Joan of Arc. Seymour Hicks and Ellaline Terriss contracted with the studio.

In December 1914, its studio in Woodlands was purchased by British Empire Films.

== Filmography ==
- Scrooge (1913)
- Always Tell Your Wife
- Seymour Hicks and Ellaline Terriss
- Rebecca the Jewess / Ivanhoe (1913)
- From Flower Girl to Red Cross Nurse written by and starring Karine Mile
- Before Our Time
- Kismet (1914)
- A Prehistoric Love Story

== See also ==
- Adaptations of A Christmas Carol
- London Film Company
- British and Colonial Films
