= Norman Kerry =

American actor (1894–1956)

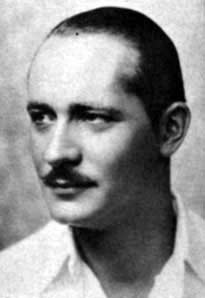
- Kerry in 1925
- Born: Norman Kaiser; June 16, 1894; Rochester, New York, U.S.
- Died: January 12, 1956 (aged 61); Los Angeles, California, U.S.
- Resting place: Holy Cross Cemetery, Culver City, California
- Occupation: Actor
- Years active: 1916–1941
- Spouses: Rozene Tripp Greppin (m. 1920; div. 1929) Helen Mary Yost Wells (m. 1932; div. 1934) Helen Mary Yost Wells (m. 1935; div. 1945) Kay English (m. 1946)

Norman Kerry (born Norman Hussey Kaiser, June 16, 1894 – January 12, 1956) was an American actor whose career in the motion picture industry spanned twenty-five years, beginning in 1916 and peaking during the silent era of the 1920s. Changing his name from the unmistakably German "Kaiser" at the onset of World War I, he rose quickly in his field, becoming "the Clark Gable of the [1920s]."

Kerry often played the heroic dashing swashbuckler or the seductive lothario. He was extremely popular with female fans. On a personal level, Kerry was known as a prankster and was said to have a wonderful sense of humor and to be very popular. He also achieved some recognition as a dog fancier, maintaining kennels at his home that were "known throughout the world among lovers of aristocratic dogs." As his film career waned in the 1930s, he became known as an international bon vivant and adventurer who lived in the French Riviera and even joined the French Foreign Legion.

== Film career ==
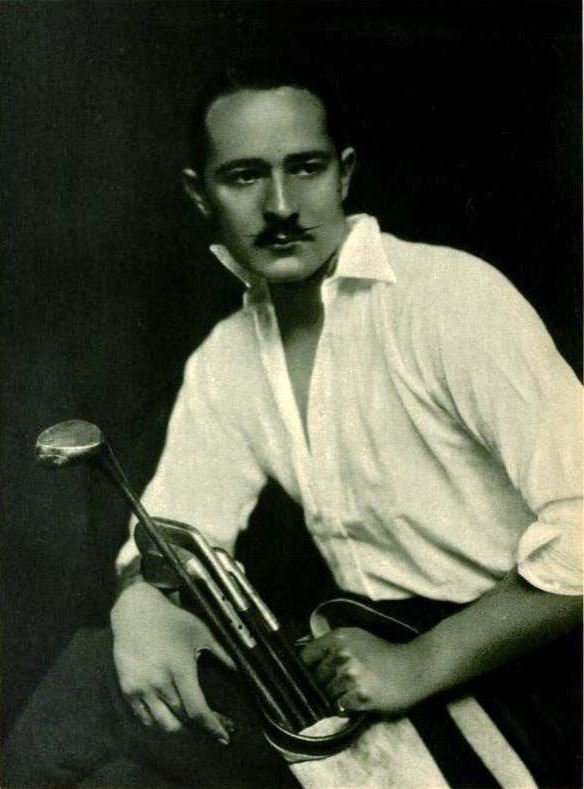
Kerry c. 1921

Kerry made his first film appearance in the 1916 comedy Manhattan Madness, starring Douglas Fairbanks and directed by Allan Dwan. Dwan needed young people with horses to appear in a scene and Kerry volunteered himself and his friends to fill that need. The following year, Kerry rose to leading actor status in A Little Princess, playing opposite actress Mary Pickford. He again appeared with Mary Pickford in 1918, in Amarilly of Clothes-line Alley, and that in turn led to his being chosen by Constance Talmadge as her leading man in Up the Road with Sallie. He was "on his way!"

Kerry's career flourished from the time of those early successes and throughout the 1920s—the silent film era. In 1920, he was paid a salary of $750 per week and by 1930 he had been under contract with Universal Pictures for twelve years and was thought to be among the actors who had played the most roles in his career. He wore a fancy waxed mustache and slicked-back hair, exemplifying the "tall, dark, and handsome" matinee idol of the time. In 1923, he starred in two of his most popular films, the enormous box-office success The Hunchback of Notre Dame, with Lon Chaney and Patsy Ruth Miller and the controversial Merry-Go-Round, opposite Mary Philbin. In Merry-Go-Round, Austrian director Erich von Stroheim chose Kerry to play von Stroheim's alter-ego 'Count Franz Maximilian Von Hohenegg', but producer Irving Thalberg replaced von Stroheim with director Rupert Julian during filming. The film is now considered a classic.

Kerry was again cast with Lon Chaney and Mary Philbin in the 1925 horror classic The Phantom of the Opera, playing Philbin's love-interest, the Vicomte Raoul de Chagny. The film was an enormous financial and critical success and solidified Kerry's position as a leading actor during the 1920s. That same year Kerry starred with Philbin in the melodrama Fifth Avenue Models and with Patsy Ruth Miller in the adventure film Lorraine of the Lions. In 1927, Kerry again shared the screen with Lon Chaney in The Unknown, also starring Joan Crawford. By the end of the decade, he had appeared in high-profile roles opposite Anna Q. Nilsson, Marion Davies, Bebe Daniels, Mildred Harris, Lillian Gish, and Claire Windsor, among others.

At the beginning of the talkie era, Kerry reunited with Mary Philbin to film talking scenes for The Phantom of the Opera, reissued with sound December 15, 1929. However, this was the beginning of Kerry's decline; he made only a few American films after 1930. Among them were Air Eagles and Bachelor Apartment in 1931 and Kerry's final film, Tanks a Million, in 1941. During the 1930s, Kerry also made some movies for British, German, and Italian producers.

For his contributions to the motion picture industry, in 1960 Kerry was awarded a star on the Hollywood Walk of Fame at 6724 Hollywood Blvd., Hollywood, California.

== Personal life ==
Born in Rochester, New York on June 16, 1894, Kerry was the son of Isaac and Eunice Kaiser. As he was growing up, he lived with his family in New York City and Long Island. He was a student at the DeLaSalle School, St. John's College, and the University of Maryland, where he was an athlete. Kerry's father, Isaac Kaiser, was a leather goods manufacturer and dealer and Kerry himself spent some time as a representative for that company.

Around 1916, Kerry befriended Rudolph Valentino, who was then known as an exhibition dancer, in New York City. He is said to have introduced Valentino to Bonnie Glass, who became Valentino's dance partner. Later, Kerry encouraged Valentino to try making a name for himself in film, staked him for a trip to Los Angeles, and helped him get his first roles.

In 1917, despite having already achieved some success in the motion picture industry, Kerry enlisted in the British Royal Flying Corps and was to report for training in Toronto in September of that year, with a commission as a lieutenant. However, on November 2, Kerry's father died, leading to his being granted six months leave. In 1918, he served briefly (October 2 to December 4) in the U.S. Army, returning to Los Angeles and his film career by the end of that year.

Kerry had been living in a Los Angeles hotel in June 1917 but by the end of the year, he took up residence in a bungalow in Hollywood, where he was joined by his mother and sister. They moved to a house at the entrance to Laurel Canyon the following June. Kerry was still living with his mother and sister as of January 1920.

About six weeks later, Kerry was married for the first time. His bride was a 22-year-old divorcee, Rozene (Tripp) Greppin, said to be an heiress. The marriage did not last. The couple separated on November 11, 1928 and Rozene filed for divorce the following April, charging that Kerry called her vile names in front of others, stayed away for extended periods, and ignored her; the divorce was granted on June 7, 1929.

About two weeks after the divorce was granted, Kerry made a very public effort to win Rozene back. On June 20, 1929, she was scheduled to board the ocean liner Majestic in New York, bound for England. After learning that she was there, Kerry attempted to board the ship, seeking a reconciliation. Having neither ticket nor passport, Kerry was not allowed on board. Nevertheless, he then scaled a fence around the baggage area, evaded crew members who tried to stop him, and entered the ship on an escalator used to load baggage. Once in England, he was required to put up a passport bond and remained there for about two days. His efforts to save the marriage were unsuccessful.

Kerry's second wife was Helen Mary (Yost) Wells, ex-wife of a New York grain broker. They were married in New York on November 2, 1932. The couple said that they had been friends since before their previous marriages; he was 38 and she gave her age as 32. Just over two months later, they separated and Helen moved out of their home and into a hotel. There followed a reconciliation, but the following year Helen filed for divorce, alleging that Kerry drank heavily. The divorce was granted on September 17, 1934.

This divorce was not the end of Kerry's relationship with Helen. Though there were rumors of a reconciliation with first wife Rozene, Kerry later followed Helen to Vienna, Austria, and the two eventually remarried there. Kerry had often been living and working in Europe since the beginning of their marriage. He lived in Brussels for a time and by 1940 he and Helen were living in the French Riviera, near Nice.

Kerry's life then took a surprising turn: in January 1940, he enlisted in the French Foreign Legion. He explained to Helen, who ultimately acquiesced in his decision, that he owed it to the French, whose hospitality he had been enjoying, and that he had been dissatisfied with the shallowness of his life as an actor; he wanted to have "real experiences, not just make-believe." In the Legion, he saw service in Luxembourg and Morocco, but his tour of duty lasted less than a year because of the fall of France to Nazi Germany. In January 1941, Kerry returned to California.

The following year brought news that Kerry had become engaged to actress Kay English, though their marriage would have to wait until there was a final divorce decree between Kerry and Helen. Kerry and English did eventually marry, in 1946, and they remained married until his death in 1956.

At the age of 61, on January 12, 1956, Norman Kerry died from a liver ailment at Cedars of Lebanon Hospital in Los Angeles. He was interred at Holy Cross Cemetery, Culver City, California.

== Selected filmography ==
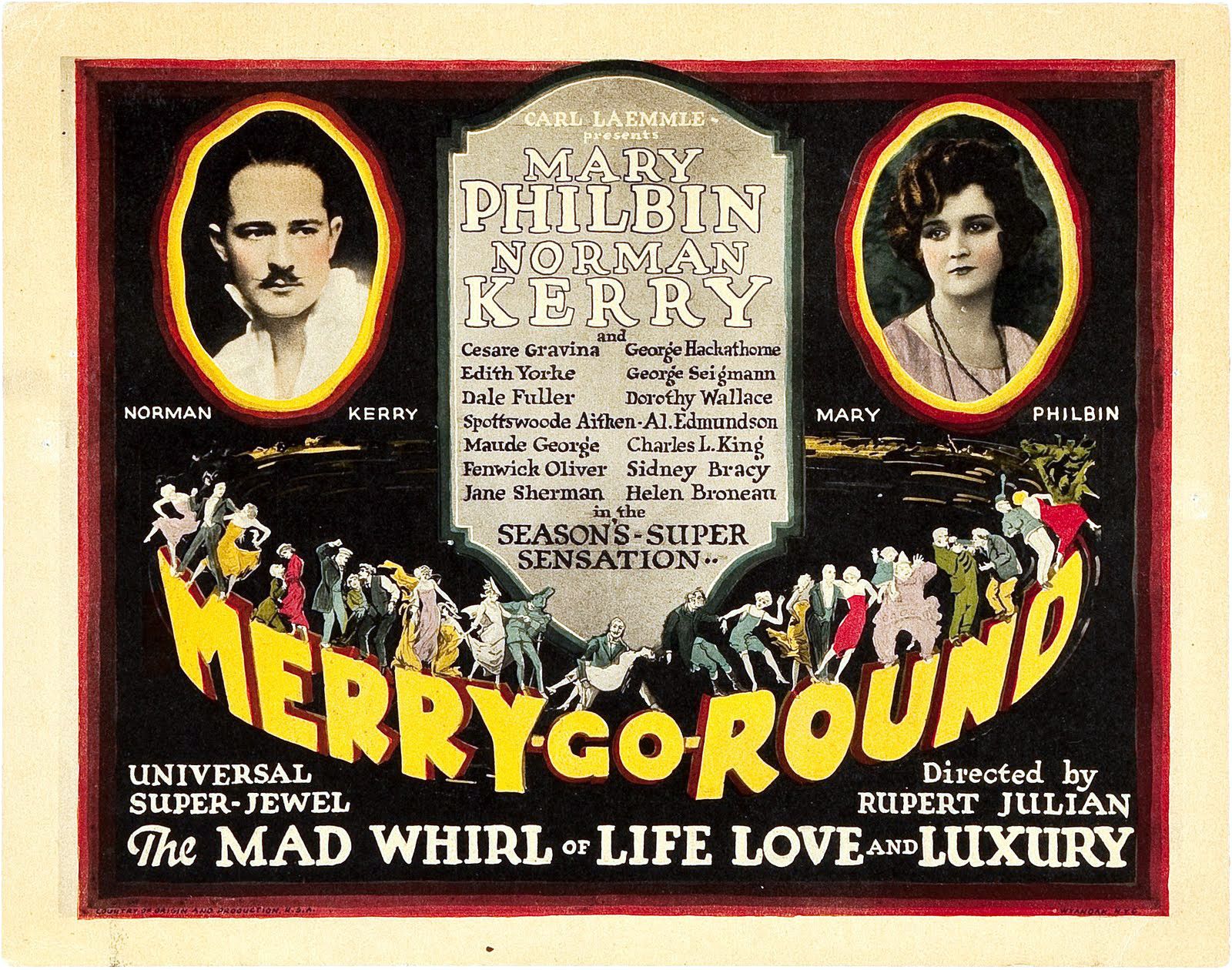
Merry-Go-Round (1923)

- Vanity (1916) - Crandell
- Manhattan Madness (1916) - Minor Role (uncredited)
- The Black Butterfly (1916) - Vladimir
- The Little American (1917) - Wounded Soldier (uncredited)
- The Little Princess (1917) - Capt. Richard Crewe
- Amarilly of Clothes-Line Alley (1918) - Gordon Phillips
- Up the Road with Sallie (1918) - Joshua Cabot II, aka Smith Jones
- Rose o' Paradise (1918) - Theodore King
- Good Night, Paul (1918) - Richard Landers
- The Talk of the Town (1918)
- Toton the Apache (1919) - David Lane
- Getting Mary Married (1919) - James Winthrop, Jr.
- Virtuous Sinners (1919) - Hamilton Jones
- The Dark Star (1919) - Jim Neeland
- Soldiers of Fortune (1919) - Robert Clay
- Passion's Playground (1920) - Prince Vanno Della Robbia
- A Splendid Hazard (1920) - John Fitzgerald
- Buried Treasure (1921) - Dr. John Grant
- Proxies (1921) - Peter Mendoza
- The Wild Goose (1921) - Ogden Fenn
- Little Italy (1921) - Antonio Tumullo
- Get-Rich-Quick Wallingford (1921) - 'Blackie' Daw
- Three Live Ghosts (1922) - Billy Foster
- Find the Woman (1922) - Marc Weber
- The Man from Home (1922) - Prince Kinsillo
- Till We Meet Again (1922) - Robert Carter
- Brothers Under the Skin (1922) - Thomas Kirtland
- Is Money Everything? (1923) - John Brand
- Merry-Go-Round (1923) - Count Franz Maximilian Von Hohenegg
- The Hunchback of Notre Dame (1923) - Phoebus de Chateaupers
- The Acquittal (1923) - Robert Armstrong
- The Thrill Chaser (1923) - Norman Kerry
- The Satin Girl (1923) - Dr. Richard Taunton
- The Shadow of the Desert (1924) - Said
- Daring Youth (1924) - John J. Campbell
- True As Steel (1924) - Harry Boutelle
- Cytherea (1924) - Peyton Morris
- Between Friends (1924) - Jack Greylock
- Butterfly (1924) - Konrad Kronski
- So This Is Marriage? (1924)
- Hello, 'Frisco (1924, Short) - Himself
- The Price of Pleasure (1925) - Garry Schuyler
- The Phantom of the Opera (1925) - Vicomte Raoul de Chagny
- Fifth Avenue Models (1925) - Francis Doran
- Lorraine of the Lions (1925) - Don Mackay
- Under Western Skies (1926) - Robert Erskine
- Mademoiselle Modiste (1926) - Etienne
- The Barrier (1926) - Meade Burrell
- The Love Thief (1926) - Prince Boris Alexander Emanuel Augustus
- The Claw (1927) - Maurice Stair
- Annie Laurie (1927) - Ian Macdonald
- The Unknown (1927) - Malabar the Mighty
- Love Me and the World Is Mine (1927) (also known as The Affairs of Hannerl (1928)) - Von Vigilatti
- Body and Soul (1927) - Ruffo
- The Irresistible Lover (1927) - J. Harrison Gray
- Horse Shoes (1927)
- The Foreign Legion (1928) - Richard Farquhar
- The Woman from Moscow (1928) - Loris Ipanoff
- Man, Woman and Wife (1929) - Rance Rogers / Ralph Brandon
- The Bondman (1929) - Jason
- Trial Marriage (1929) - Oliver Mowbray
- The Woman I Love (1929) - Kenneth Hamilton
- The Prince of Hearts (1929) - Prince Casimir
- Ex-Flame (1930) - Beaumont Winthrop
- The Hawk (1931) - Miguel Morago - aka The Hawk
- Bachelor Apartment (1931) - Lee Graham
- Air Eagles (1931) - Otto Schumann
- The Phantom of Santa Fe (1936) (also known as The Hawk (1931))
- Tanks a Million (1941) - Major (final film role)
