= Daring Youth =

1924 silent film by William Beaudine

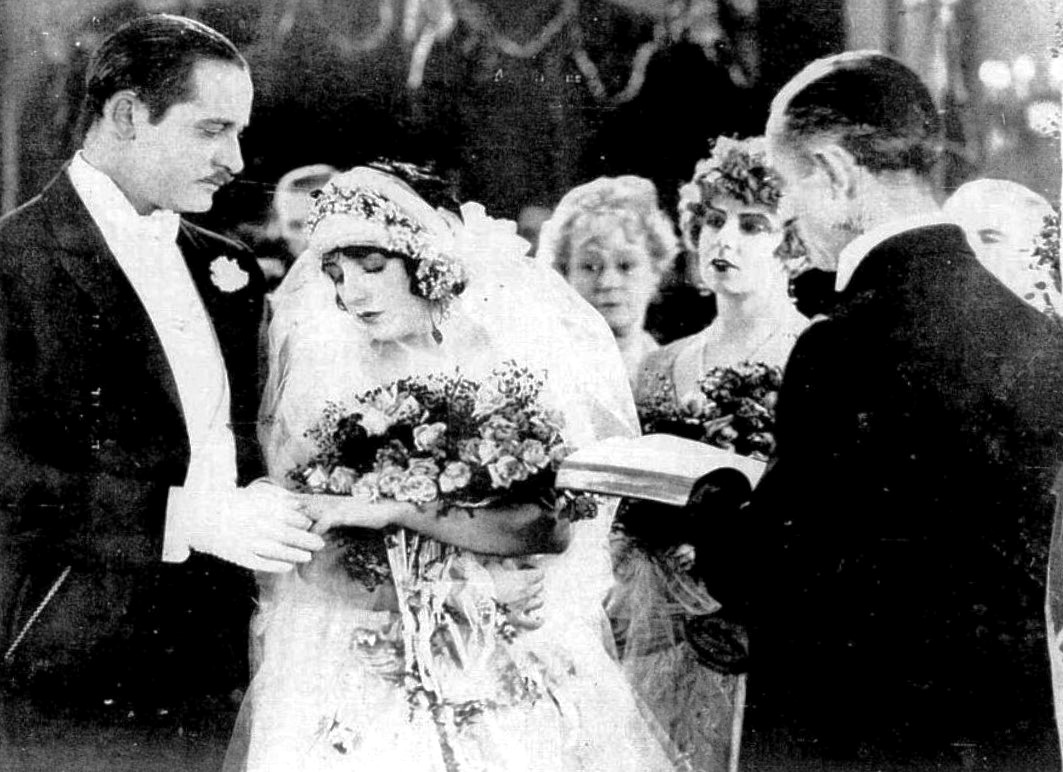
- Film still
- Directed by: William Beaudine
- Written by: Dorothy Farnum (story), Alexander Neal
- Based on: The Taming of the Shrew by William Shakespeare
- Produced by: B.F. Zeidman
- Starring: Bebe Daniels; Norman Kerry
- Cinematography: Charles Van Enger
- Edited by: Edward M. McDermott
- Distributed by: Principal Distributing Company
- Release date: February 1, 1924
- Running time: 60 minutes
- Country: United States
- Language: Silent (English intertitles)

Daring Youth is a 1924 American silent comedy-drama film directed by William Beaudine, starring Bebe Daniels, Norman Kerry, and Lee Moran. It is loosely based on William Shakespeare's The Taming of the Shrew.

== Plot ==
As described in a film magazine review, Mr. and Mrs. Allen have battled for the twenty-five years of their married life and Mrs. Allen is determined that her daughter Alita shall not lose romance through her marriage. She advocates the theory that wives and husbands should live together only three days each week and should keep their friends. Alita marries John J. Campbell under these conditions, but she soon tires of the system as does John, although neither will admit it. John finally is unable to stand it any longer and asserts himself by beating up his wife's escort. Alita is glad to consent to lead a conventional married life.

== Cast ==
- Bebe Daniels as Alita Allen
- Norman Kerry as John J. Campbell
- Lee Moran as Arthur James
- Arthur Hoyt as Winston Howell
- Lillian Langdon as Mrs. Allen
- George C. Pearce as Mr. Allen

== Status ==
With no prints of Daring Youth found in any film archives, it is a lost film.
