= Ethyle Batley =

British actress and filmmaker (1876–1917)

- Born: 3 December 1876; Wigan, northwest England
- Died: 23 April 1917 (aged 40)
- Occupations: Film director, Actress and Screenwriter

Ethyle Batley (born Alice Ethel Murray; 3 December 1876 – 23 April 1917) was a British film director, actress and screenwriter. She made nearly 70 films between 1912 and her early death in 1917.

== Early life and career ==
Batley was born in December 1876 in Wigan, northwest England, the second daughter of an iron merchant. In the late 1890s, she travelled to London to work as a theatre actress, performing under the name Ethyle Gordon Murray.

While working with a touring theatre company, Murray met Ernest Batley, an actor from East London. They were married on 22 June 1901 at a registry office ceremony in Wandsworth, and began their married life living in Battersea. In 1902, Ernest and Ethyle had their first child, actress Dorothy Audrey Batley, who was born on 18 January.

== Film career ==
Ethyle's first directing credit was in October 1912, with the film Peggy Gets Rid of the Baby, which starred Dorothy in the lead role. During the First World War, Batley was one of the most active directors of patriotic films.

== Legacy ==
Batley's contribution to the early history of cinema in Britain has often been overlooked or understated. In 2009, film historian Gerry Turvey described her as a "unique figure" who "merits fuller recognition than she has so far received".
