= Lauderdale Maitland =

British actor (1878–1929)

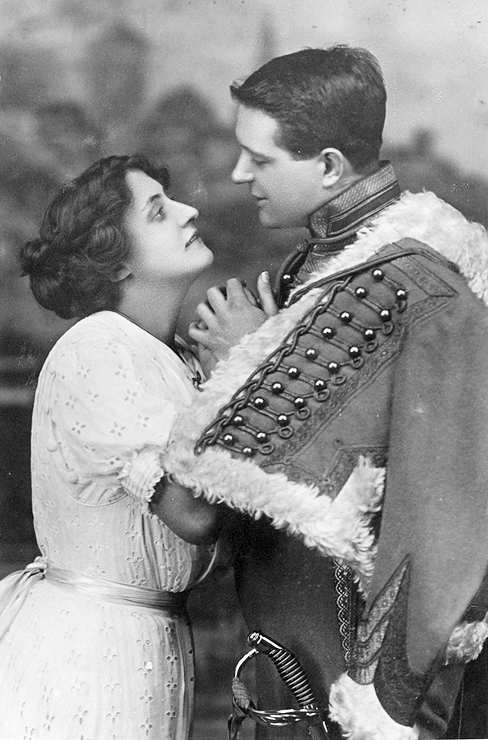
Nora Kerin as Princess Monica and Lauderdale Maitland as Prince Olaf in The Prince and the Beggar Maid at the Lyceum Theatre (1908)

Lauderdale Valentine John Maitland (1878 – 28 February 1929) was a British stage and film actor.

He was born in 1878 in Merton, at that time in Surrey, the son of Adele and William Lauderdale Maitland, a florist. On 29 April 1905 he married Sara Gertrude Tomlinson. The marriage was later dissolved. In 1908 he played Prince Olaf in The Prince and the Beggar Maid and Benvolio in Romeo and Juliet opposite Nora Kerin as Juliet and Matheson Lang as Romeo. In about 1920 he played Harry Maylie in Oliver Twist. All three productions were staged at the Lyceum Theatre in London.

Maitland died in 1929 at the Bethlem Royal Hospital in Southwark in London. He left an estate valued at £521 17s 7d to his widow, the actress Kate Janet Maitland.

== Selected filmography ==
- Ivanhoe (1913)
- The Beggar Girl's Wedding (1915)
- Queen's Evidence (1919)
- The Right to Strike (1923)
- The Taming of the Shrew (1923)
- A Woman in Pawn (1927)
