= Ernest Batley =

British film director and actor

Ernest George Batley (1874-1955) was a British actor and director of silent films. He was born on 23 February 1874 in Blackheath, London, England, UK. He was known for The Tattooed Will (1914), The Master Crook Outwitted by a Child (1914) and The Master Crook Turns Detective (1914). He was married to actress Nancy Bevington and filmmaker Ethyle Batley. He died on 20 February 1955 in Bournemouth, England, UK.
