= Kitty Carstairs =

1917 novel by John Joy Bell

- Title page for Kitty Carstairs (1918)
- Author: John Joy Bell
- Language: English
- Genre: Drama
- Publication date: 1917
- Publication place: United Kingdom
- Media type: Print

Kitty Carstairs is a 1917 novel by the British writer John Joy Bell. It was adapted into a 1928 American silent film Beyond London Lights starring Adrienne Dore.

== Bibliography ==
- Goble, Alan. The Complete Index to Literary Sources in Film. Walter de Gruyter, 1999.
