= A Fair Impostor =

A Fair Impostor may refer to:

- A Fair Impostor (novel), 1909 work by Charles Garvice
- A Fair Impostor (film), a 1916 film adaptation directed by Alexander Butler
