= Grey Timothy =

1913 novel by Edgar Wallace

- Author: Edgar Wallace
- Language: English
- Genre: Sports thriller
- Publication date: 1913
- Publication place: United Kingdom
- Media type: Print

Grey Timothy is a 1913 sports thriller novel by the British writer Edgar Wallace. Brian Pallard, an Australian gambler arrives in Britain clashes with a rival English aristocrat at the racetrack.

== Adaptation ==
In 1919, it was adapted into a British silent film Pallard the Punter starring Heather Thatcher and Lionel d'Aragon.

== Bibliography ==
- Clark, Neil. Stranger than Fiction: The Life of Edgar Wallace, the Man Who Created King Kong. Stroud, Gloucs: The History Press, 2015.
- Goble, Alan. The Complete Index to Literary Sources in Film. Walter de Gruyter, 1999.
