= Nance (film) =

1920 film

- Directed by: Albert Ward
- Written by: Albert Ward
- Based on: Nance by Charles Garvice
- Produced by: G.B. Samuelson
- Starring: Isobel Elsom; James Lindsay; Ivan Samson; Mary Forbes
- Production company: G.B. Samuelson Productions
- Distributed by: General Film Distributors
- Release date: July 1920
- Running time: 5,000 feet
- Country: United Kingdom
- Languages: Silent; English intertitles

Nance is a 1920 British silent drama film directed by Albert Ward and starring Isobel Elsom, James Lindsay and Ivan Samson. It was based on the novel Nance by Charles Garvice. It depicts the relationship between an aristocratic man and a working-class woman.

== Cast ==
- Isobel Elsom as Nance Gray
- James Lindsay as Lord Stoyle
- Ivan Samson as Bernard Yorke
- Mary Forbes as Felicia Damarche
- J.R. Crawford
- Percival Clarke
- Bassett Roe
- Howard Sturge

== Bibliography ==
- Bamford, Kenton. Distorted Images: British National Identity and Film in the 1920s. I.B. Tauris, 1999.
- Low, Rachael. History of the British Film, 1918-1929. George Allen & Unwin, 1971.
