= Beyond London Lights =

1928 film

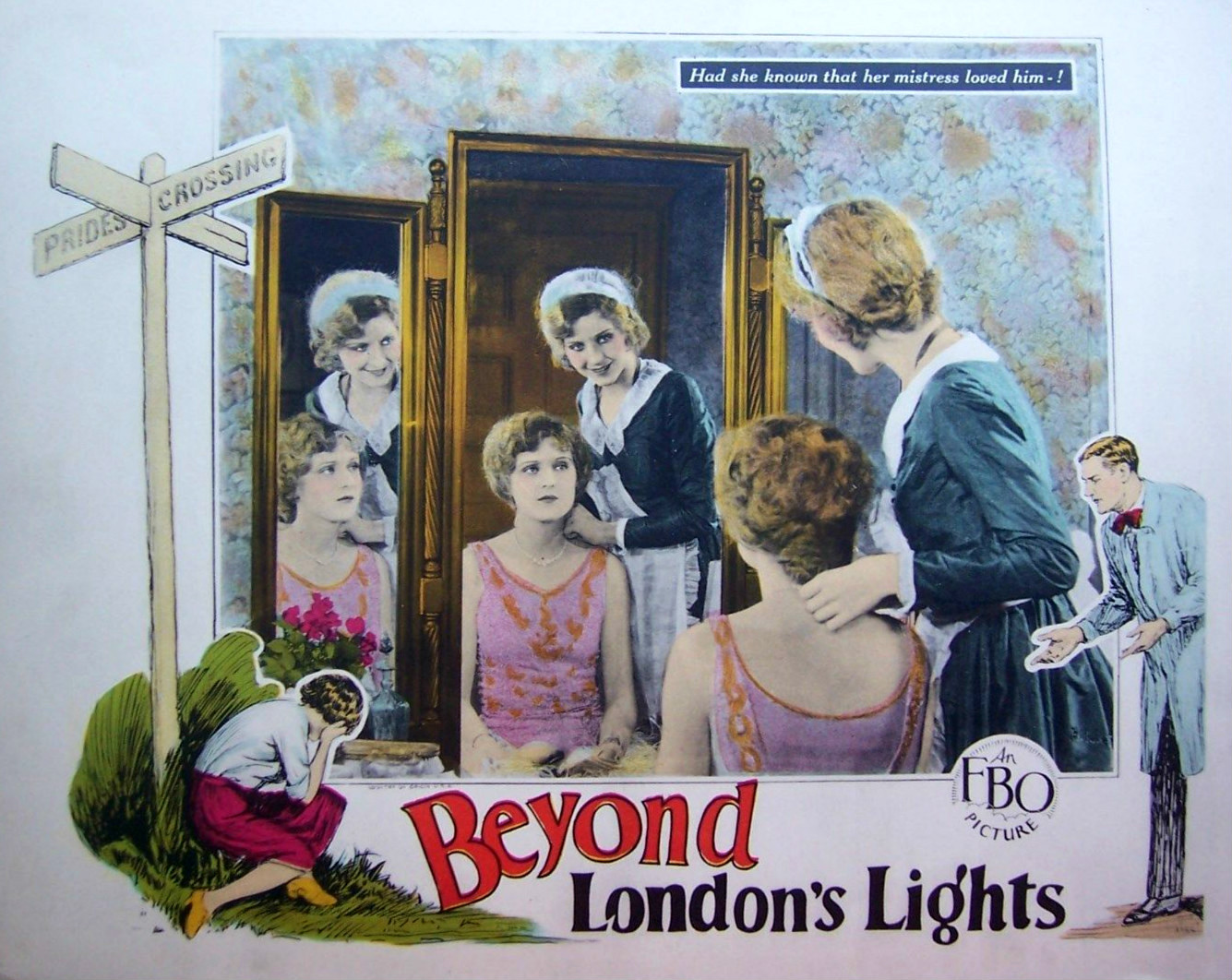
- Lobby card
- Directed by: Tom Terriss
- Written by: George M. Arthur; Jean DuPont Miller; Beatrice Burton Morgan
- Based on: Kitty Carstairs by John Joy Bell
- Starring: Adrienne Dore; Lee Shumway; Bill Elliott
- Cinematography: Robert De Grasse
- Edited by: Pandro S. Berman
- Production company: Film Booking Offices of America
- Distributed by: FBO (US); Ideal Films (UK)
- Release date: March 18, 1928
- Running time: 60 minutes
- Country: United States
- Language: Silent (English intertitles)

Beyond London Lights is a lost 1928 American silent drama film directed by Tom Terriss and starring Adrienne Dore, Lee Shumway, and Bill Elliott. It is based on John Joy Bell's 1917 novel Kitty Carstairs, and is sometimes referred to by that title. It was made by Film Booking Offices of America.

== Cast ==
- Adrienne Dore as Kitty Carstairs
- Lee Shumway as John Risk
- Wild Bill Elliott as Colin Drummond
- Herbert Evans as Symington
- Jacqueline Gadsden as Lady Dorothy
- Florence Wix as Mrs. Drummond
- Templar Saxe as Stephen Carstairs
- Blanche Craig as Mrs. Bundle
- Kathrin Clare Ward as The Landlady

== Bibliography ==
- Goble, Alan. The Complete Index to Literary Sources in Film.
