= Heroes of the Mine =

Heroes of the Mine may refer to:

- Heroes of the Mine (1913 film), a British silent drama film
- Heroes of the Mine (1932 film), a British drama film
