= Wee MacGregor's Sweetheart =

1922 film

- Directed by: George Pearson
- Written by: John Joy Bell (stories)
- Produced by: George Pearson
- Starring: Betty Balfour; Donald Macardle; Nora Swinburne
- Production company: Welsh-Pearson
- Distributed by: Jury Films
- Release date: June 1922
- Country: United Kingdom
- Languages: Silent; English intertitles

Wee MacGregor's Sweetheart is a 1922 British silent romance film directed by George Pearson and starring Betty Balfour, Donald Macardle and Nora Swinburne. The plot is based on two of the "Wee Macgreegor" books by John Joy Bell; Oh Christina and Courting Christina.

== Plot ==
In Scotland, young Christina weds young MacGregor, despite objections from Christina's snobbish aunt.

== Cast ==
- Betty Balfour as Christine
- Donald Macardle as Wee MacGregor
- Nora Swinburne as Jessie Mary
- Cyril Percival as Uncle Baldwin
- Minna Grey as Mary Purvis
- M.A. Wetherell as John Robertson
- Bryan Powley as Uncle Purdie
- Mabel Archdale as Aunt Purdie
- Lillian Christine as Lizzie
- Marie Ault as Miss Todd
- Bunty Fosse as Christina as a Child

== Bibliography ==
- Low, Rachael. The History of the British Film 1918-1929. George Allen & Unwin, 1971.
