= Key to the World =

Key to the World or variants may refer to:

- The Key of the World, 1918 British silent romance film directed by J.L.V. Leigh
- Key to the World, play by Doug Lucie
- Keys to the World, album by English singer-songwriter Richard Ashcroft 2006
- "Key to the World", song by Little Son Joe dedicated to Memphis Minnie
- "Key to the Word", a song from A New Day (Four Letter Lie album)
