= The Wild Party (1929 film) =

1929 film

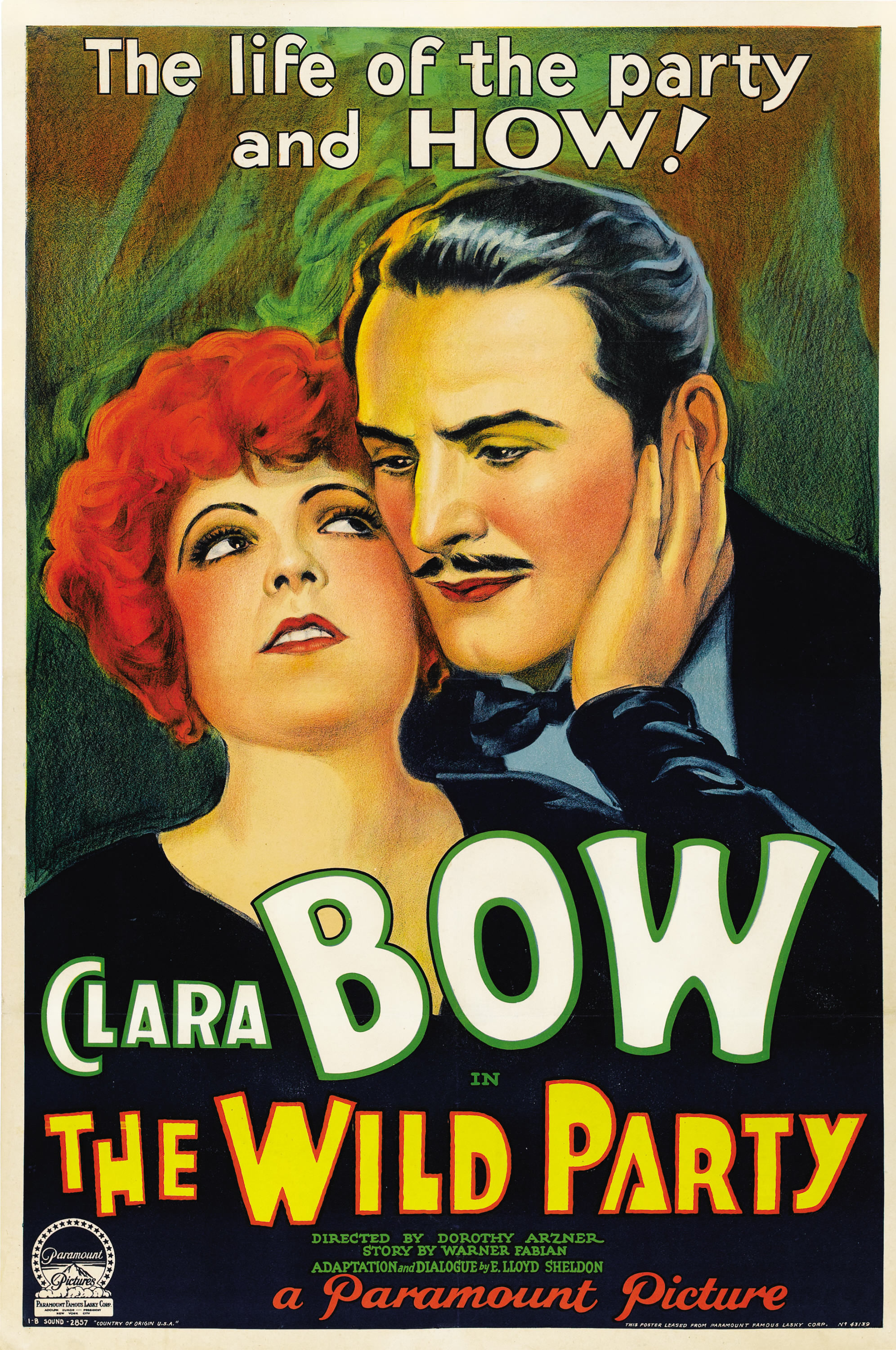
- Theatrical release poster
- Directed by: Dorothy Arzner
- Written by: Samuel Hopkins Adams; E. Lloyd Sheldon
- Produced by: Adolph Zukor; Jesse L. Lasky
- Starring: Clara Bow; Fredric March
- Cinematography: Victor Milner
- Edited by: Otho Lovering
- Music by: John Leipold
- Distributed by: Paramount Pictures
- Release date: April 6, 1929
- Running time: 77 minutes
- Country: United States
- Language: English

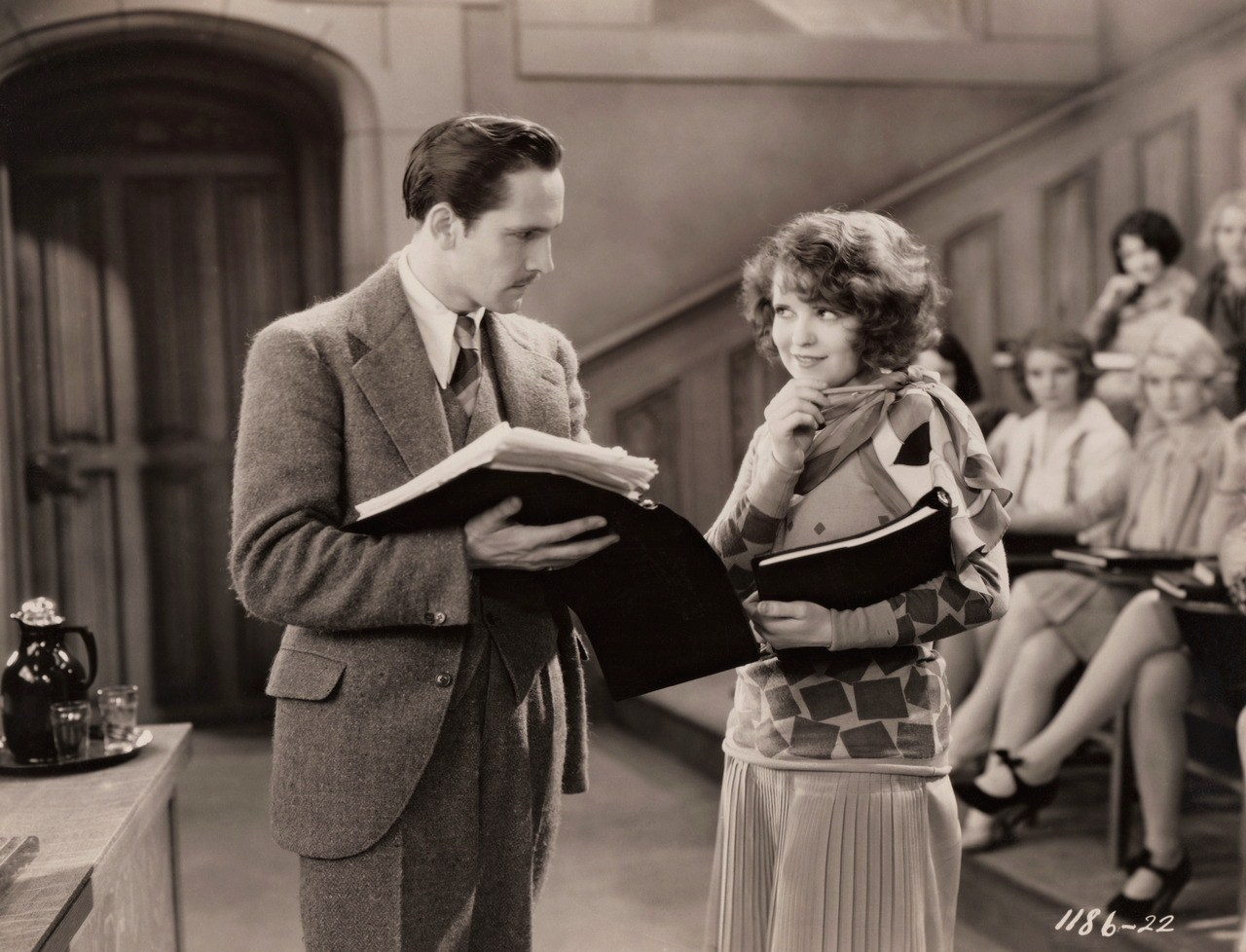
Fredric March and Clara Bow

The Wild Party is a 1929 American pre-Code film directed by Dorothy Arzner and starring Clara Bow and Fredric March. Released by Paramount Pictures, it is known as Bow's first talkie. It is the fifth film directed by Arzner and the earliest surviving film in her work as a director.

== Plot ==
The Wild Party (1929)

The film focuses on an all-female college where the students are more interested in having fun and partying than studying. Stella Ames is the most popular student, with a loud mouth. When the young and attractive professor Gilmore 'Gil' starts working there in anthropology, all the girls immediately feel attracted to him. Stella recognizes him as the man whose train sleeping compartment she accidentally entered, not realizing the mistake, thereby risking her reputation. The professor is unamused by the girls' bad behavior and does not seem to notice who Stella is.

At the end of term, a traditional costume party is held. Stella and her friends show up in revealing costumes and are therefore thrown out by Faith Morga, the head of the student body. The girls decide to go to a bar, where they are soon bothered by drunk men. They try to leave, but the men refuse to let them go. A bar fight soon ensues. All the girls are able to get away and leave with the car, but Stella is left behind. Fearing the worst, she decides to play along with the men so they will not force themselves on her. She is eventually rescued by professor Gilmore, who beats up the men.

While taking her home, she tries to show her gratitude, but he is not moved by her, pointing out her scandalous lifestyle and lack of ambition, making her upset. But Gil states that he still would kill for her and kisses her. Eva catches them and soon spreads the word, but Stella threatens to ruin her life if she continues to. Stella denies the whole story, but admits to her best friend Helen that she loves him. However, the next morning he acts as if nothing has happened, even giving her a hard time for committing plagiarism. Upset, she returns to her old lifestyle of wild parties, which includes dancing with and kissing strangers. However, when information reaches her that Gil has been shot, she realizes that she is still in love with him.

A month later, Gil returns to college. Stella visits him, and he explains to her that he hates her for what she is and loves her for what she could be. They kiss, but are interrupted by Eva. Gil acts as if nobody else is there, but Eva notices Stella's presence. After she leaves, they enjoy a romantic evening until a fire drill interrupts them. While reporting to the dean, Helen loses a letter she has written to George, a man she is secretly seeing, despite the fact that it is prohibited for students to date. It turns out that Eva has found the letter and threatens to reveal both Helen and Stella's admirers. She later admits to their friend Babs that she has given the letter to Faith Morgan.

Stella later tries to protect Helen and takes the blame, claiming that it was she who wrote the letter. She prepares to leave college, but Gil follows her on the train and they are reunited. He tells her that he does not believe her claim that she wrote the letter and announces that he has left college too.

== Cast ==
- Clara Bow as Stella Ames
- Fredric March as James 'Gil' Gilmore
- Marceline Day as Faith Morgan
- Shirley O'Hara as Helen Owens
- Adrienne Dore as Babs
- Joyce Compton as Eva Tutt
- Jack Oakie as Al
- Jack Luden as George
- Phillips Holmes as Phil

== Production ==
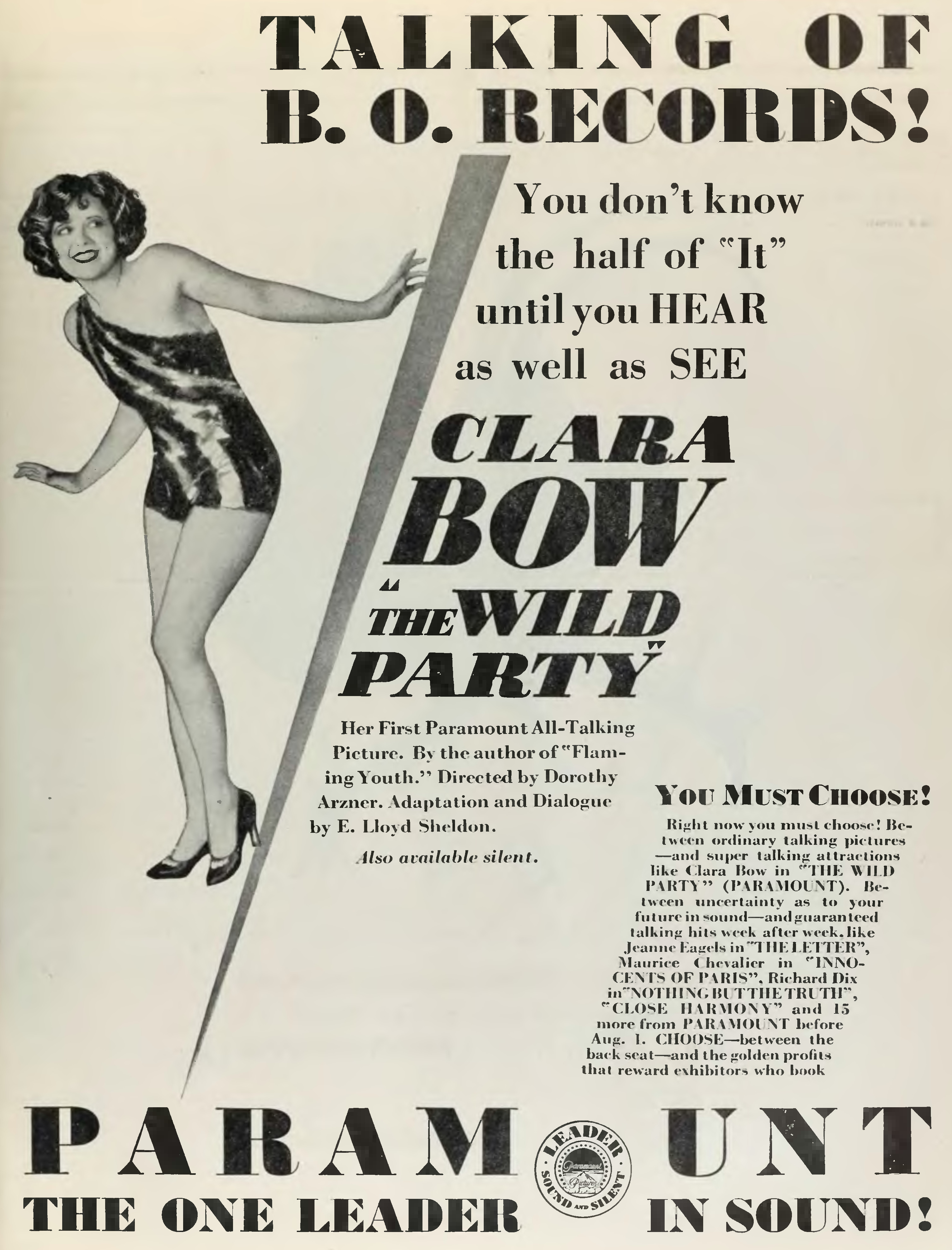
The Wild Party ad from The Film Daily, 1929

Bow was unable to get used to the microphones. During her first line, the microphone reportedly exploded, which caused a technical problem at the studio. As Bow was very nervous about the new sound generation system, Arzner tried to comfort her by devising what is reputed to be the first fishpole microphone to allow flexibility of placement. Bow thereby had the freedom to move while filming.

== Release ==
The film is known for being Clara Bow's talkie debut. A silent film version was released as well, for theaters which did not yet have sound equipment. The film had mixed reviews and Bow's Brooklyn accent was the key point of discussion. One critic described her voice as a 'smooth contralto, vigorous and natural', while another said that she had a 'harsh tonal quality that is not very easy on sensitive eardrums'. Variety stated that her voice was 'good enough' to survive the transition to sound. Film Daily also stated that there was 'nothing wrong' with her 'hard and metallic' voice.

Nevertheless, The Wild Party did well at the box office and confirmed Dorothy Arzner's abilities as a director. With its success, her career reached its high point. Bow's less appreciative reviews have often been explained by the rushed production.

== Censorship ==
When The Wild Party was released in the United States, many states and cities in the United States had censor boards that could require cuts or other eliminations before the film could be shown. In Ohio, the censors ordered offending scenes cut, but as the law had yet to extend the board's full authority over the recent advent of talking pictures, the film was shown with the screen dark for the eliminated scene but with full sound and dialog, causing much laughter by the audience.

== See also ==
- List of early sound feature films (1926–1929)
