= Wee Macgreegor =

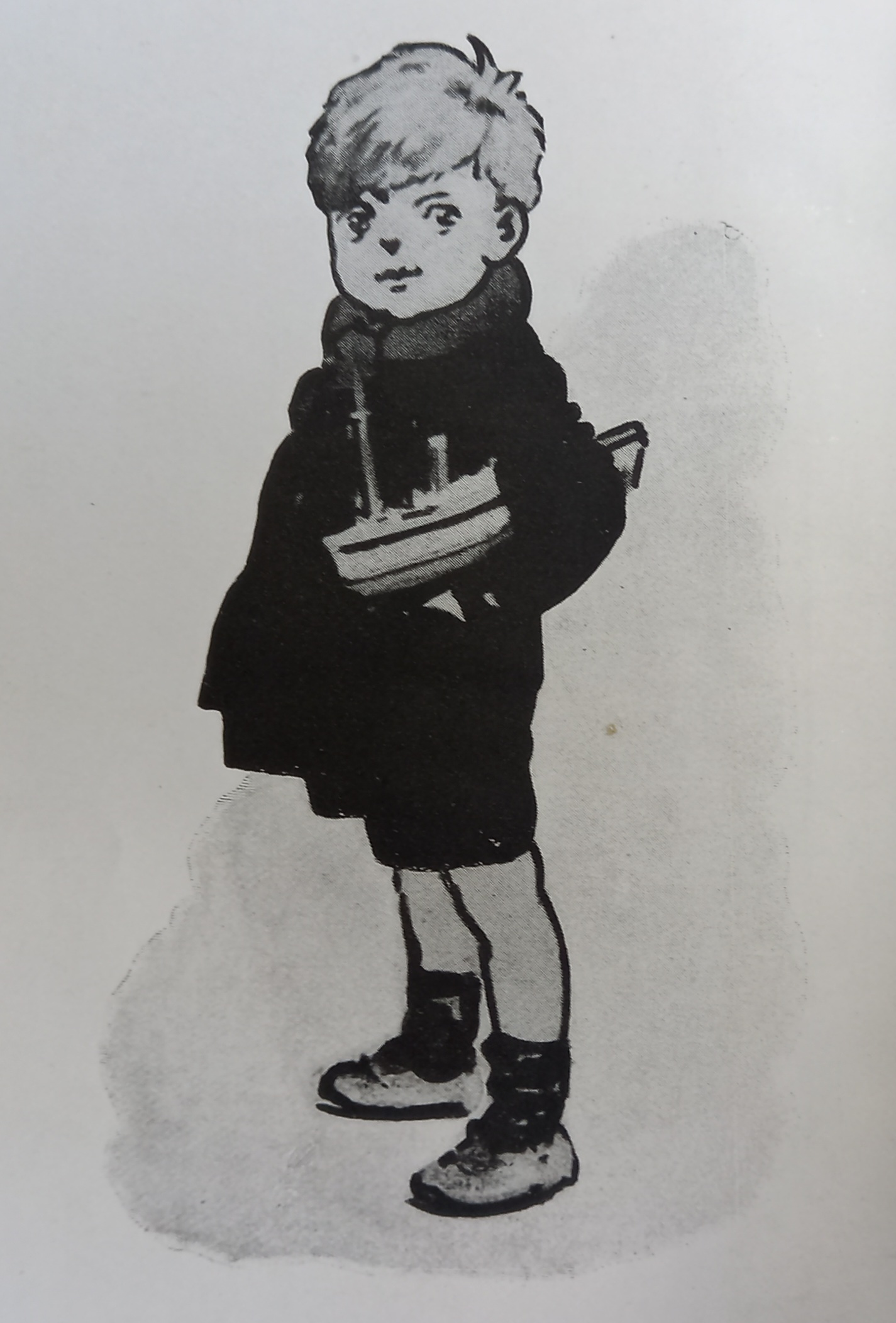
John Hassel's illustration for the early editions of Wee Macgreegor.

Wee Macgreegor (properly called Macgregor Robinson and sometimes spelt "Wee Macgregor") is a character created in newspaper short stories and books written by the Scottish journalist and author, John Joy Bell, first appearing in the Glasgow Evening Times in 1901. Initially, he was a cheeky young boy with an insatiable fondness for sweets, the son of respectable working class parents, Lizzie and John Robinson, who lived in Glasgow. Reported speech in the stories is written in the Glasgow dialect. Later books covered Wee Macgreegor's adolescence and enlistment during the First World War.

== Origin ==
Bell had been writing some short stories and poems for The Glasgow Herald, when he was invited to contribute to the Glasgow Evening Times by its editor, A. Dewar Willock. The inspiration for the character came from an encounter which Bell had had a decade earlier on a Clyde steamer, when he overheard a mother tell her son:

Macgreegor, tak yer paw's haun', or ye'll get nae carvies tae yer tea! ("Macgregor take your pa's hand, or you'll get no caraway cakes for your tea!")

The first short story about the Robinson family and their young son, "Wee Macgreegor", appeared in the Evening Times in 1901.

== Publication ==
The cover of Courtin' Christina!, the fourth sequel.

When Bell had written some fifteen stories, he decided to publish them in book form. The manuscript was rejected by numerous publishers on the grounds that it was of local interest only. Eventually, publisher J. A. Westwood Oliver, managing director of the Scots Pictorial Publishing Co, was persuaded to publish on condition that Bell guarantee fifty copies, which Bell's brother was able to do. The first copies were under the title Macgreegor, but Oliver suggested the addition of "Wee" to the title in later impressions. The book was published on 23 November 1902 and had sold 70,000 copies by the end of the year. Publication was later taken over by Mills & Boon of London and then by Thos. Nelson & Sons, who included it in their series of "Sevenpennies" in 1913. An illustration depicting Wee Macgreegor was drawn by John Hassall (1868-1948), an image that was subsequently used on all kinds of merchandise, especially "taiblet" (tablet), Macgreegor's favourite sweet.

The success of the first book led to a number of sequels:

- Wee Macgreegor (1902)
- Wee Macgreegor Again (1904)
- Later Adventures of Wee Macgreegor (1904)
- Oh! Christina! (1909)
- Courtin' Christina (1913)
- Wee Macgreegor Enlists (1915)
- Kiddies (1917)

== Other media ==
In 1911, Alfred Wareing, the founder of the Glasgow Repertory Theatre, rewrote some of the stories as a stage play. It was produced by Harold Chapin and was performed at the Royalty Theatre, Glasgow, with a fourteen-year-old messenger boy in the lead role. The play was revived by the Scottish Youth Theatre in 1994.

In 1923, a silent film, The Wee MacGregor's Sweetheart, was directed by George Pearson and starred Betty Balfour. It was based on the later "Wee Macgreegor" books, Oh Christina and Courting Christina.
