= The Loves of Mary, Queen of Scots =

1923 film by Denison Clift

- Directed by: Denison Clift
- Written by: Denison Clift
- Starring: Fay Compton; Gerald Ames; Ivan Samson; John Stuart
- Production company: Ideal Film Company
- Distributed by: Ideal Film Company
- Release date: October 1923
- Country: United Kingdom
- Language: English

The Loves of Mary, Queen of Scots is a 1923 British silent historical film directed by Denison Clift and starring Fay Compton, Gerald Ames and Ivan Samson. The film depicts the life of Mary, Queen of Scots, and her eventual execution. It was one of the final films made by Ideal, one of the leading British studios, before they were hit by the Slump of 1924. It is most likely considered a lost film.

== Cast ==
- Fay Compton as Mary Stuart
- Gerald Ames as Bothwell
- Ivan Samson as Lord Dudley
- John Stuart as George Douglas
- Ellen Compton as Queen Elizabeth I of England
- Lionel d'Aragon as Moray
- Harvey Braban as Ruthven
- Irene Rooke as Catherine de' Medici
- Donald Macardle as Francis II
- René Maupré as Rizzio
- Ernest A. Douglas as Cardinal
- Sydney Seaward as Lord Douglas
- Edward Sorley as John Knox
- Betty Faire as Mary Beaton
- Dorothy Fane as Mary Beaton
- Nancy Kenyon as Mary Fleming
- Julie Hartley-Milburn as Mary Seaton
- Basil Rathbone (uncredited)
- Jack Cardiff (uncredited)

== Bibliography ==
- Low, Rachael. The History of British Film, Volume 4 1918-1929. Routledge, 1997.
