= A Fair Impostor (film) =

- Directed by: Alexander Butler
- Written by: Charles Garvice (novel); Harry Engholm
- Produced by: G.B. Samuelson
- Starring: Madge Titheradge; Gerald McCarthy; Charles Rock
- Production company: G.B. Samuelson Productions
- Distributed by: Moss Films
- Release date: December 1916
- Country: United Kingdom
- Languages: Silent; English intertitles

A Fair Impostor is a 1916 British silent drama film directed by Alexander Butler and starring Madge Titheradge, Gerald McCarthy and Charles Rock. It was made at Isleworth Studios. It was based on a 1909 novel of the same title by Charles Garvice.

== Outline ==
The daughter of a lord discovers that a maid is her missing sister. She poses as the maid, to gain her inheritance.

== Cast ==
- Madge Titheradge as Lady Irene
- Gerald McCarthy as Terence Castleford
- Charles Rock as Lord Mercia
- Alice De Winton as Elsa Graham
- Edward O'Neill as Mayne Redmayne
- Harry Lofting as Vicar
- Lionel d'Aragon
- Florence Nelson

== Bibliography ==
- Harris, Ed. Britain's Forgotten Film Factory: The Story of Isleworth Studios. Amberley Publishing, 2013.
