= Ivan Samson =

British actor (1894–1963)

- Born: 28 August 1894; Brighton, Sussex, England, United Kingdom
- Died: 1 May 1963 (aged 68); London, England, United Kingdom
- Years active: 1920–1959 (films)

Ivan Samson (28 August 1894 – 1 May 1963) was a British stage, film and television actor. Samson appeared regularly in West End plays and from 1920 began appearing in British silent films. He played Viscount de Mornay in I Will Repay and Lord Dudley in The Loves of Mary, Queen of Scots. In later talkie films, Samson played roles in the literary adaptations The Winslow Boy (1948) and The Browning Version (1951). His final film appearance was as Admiral Loddon in the 1959 film Libel. He also appeared in television series such as The Teckman Biography, Operation Diplomat and Dixon of Dock Green.

== Selected filmography ==
- Nance (1920)
- I Will Repay (1923)
- The Loves of Mary, Queen of Scots (1923)
- The Fake (1927)
- Many Waters (1931)
- Blossom Time (1934)
- Royal Cavalcade (1935)
- The Student's Romance (1935)
- Honours Easy (1935)
- Hail and Farewell (1936)
- Stepping Toes (1938)
- Waltz Time (1945)
- The Winslow Boy (1948)
- Landfall (1949)
- Golden Arrow (1949)
- Paul Temple's Triumph (1950)
- The Browning Version (1951)
- You Pay Your Money (1957)
- Libel (1959)
