= Undercover Men =

- Directed by: Sam Newfield
- Story by: Murison Dunn (Screen Story)
- Starring: Charles Starrett; Adrienne Dore; Kenne Duncan; Wheeler Oakman
- Cinematography: Sam Leavitt
- Edited by: Alex Meyers
- Production company: Booth Productions
- Distributed by: Dominion Motion Pictures (Canada); Columbia Pictures (USA)
- Release date: December 1, 1934
- Running time: 61 minutes
- Country: Canada
- Language: English

Undercover Men is a 1934 Canadian Western film directed by Sam Newfield and starring Charles Starrett, Adrienne Dore, Kenne Duncan and Wheeler Oakman. It was made in Toronto by the B-movie company Booth Productions. With a plot following the activities of the Royal Canadian Mounted Police, the film contains elements of a Northern.

In 1934 it was released as a quota quickie in the United Kingdom by MGM, as it was eligible for the British quota having been made within the British Empire.

== Plot ==
For showing cowardice during a holdup, bank teller Bob Hunter is fired. He joins the Mounties and is assigned to look for those robbers. To have him work undercover, the Inspector's scheme is to have Bob supposedly kicked out of the Mounties.

== Cast ==
- Charles Starrett as Constable Robert Hunter
- Adrienne Dore as Betty Winton
- Kenne Duncan as Blake Hardy (as Kenneth Duncan)
- Wheeler Oakman as Insp. A.R. McCrae
- Eric Clavering as Madigan
- Philip Brandon as Constable Jamie Jamieson (as Phil Brandon)
- Austin Moran as Sgt. Woods
- Grace Webster as Mrs. Jamieson
- Gilmore Young as Hyde
- Elliott Lorraine as Mr. Winton
- Wilbur Freeman as Hammond
- Farnham Baxter as One-Eyed Ezra Hardy (as Farnham Barter)
- Muriel Deane as Lady in hardware store

== Bibliography ==
- Pitts, Michael R. Western Movies: A Guide to 5,105 Feature Films. McFarland, 2012.
