= The Fair Maid of Perth (film) =

1923 British film by Edwin Greenwood

- Directed by: Edwin Greenwood
- Written by: Walter Scott (novel); Eliot Stannard
- Produced by: Jack Buchanan
- Starring: Russell Thorndike; Sylvia Caine; Lionel d'Aragon; Wallace Bosco
- Production company: Anglia Films
- Distributed by: Anglia Films
- Release dates: 1923; October 1925 (General release)
- Running time: 6 reels
- Country: United Kingdom
- Languages: Silent; English intertitles

The Fair Maid of Perth is a 1923 British silent adventure film directed by Edwin Greenwood and starring Russell Thorndike, Sylvia Caine and Lionel d'Aragon. It was made at Beaconsfield Studios, and based on the 1828 novel The Fair Maid of Perth by Sir Walter Scott.

== Cast ==
- Russell Thorndike as Dwining
- Sylvia Caine as Catherine
- Lionel d'Aragon as Black Douglas
- Tristan Rawson as Harry Gow
- Charles Barratt
- Lionelle Howard
- Donald Macardle
- Sidney Paxton
- Wallace Bosco
- Jack Denton
- Leal Douglas
- Kate Gurney

== Bibliography ==
- Low, Rachael. History of the British Film, 1918-1929. George Allen & Unwin, 1971.
