= Florence Nelson =

English actress (1864–1953)

Florence Nelson (25 October 1864 – 12 January 1953) was an English stage and film actress of the silent film era.

== Life ==
Born in Chelsea, London, in 1864, the daughter of John Henry Fielder, gentleman, of Nelson Lodge, Trafalgar Square, Chelsea, and his wife Emily Steed, who had married in Chelsea on 3 December 1863, she began life as Emma Florence Fielder and was christened into the Church of England on 3 December. In 1871, Mr and Mrs Fielder were still at Nelson Lodge, with Florence, her younger brother John, and four servants, a cook, a housemaid, a nurse, and a groom. Ten years later, the family was unaltered and at the same address, and J. H. Fielder was described as “Land and House Owner”. He died at home on 27 April 1885, aged 44, leaving an estate valued at £5,312, equivalent to £724,750 in 2023.

As an actress, Florence Fielder later adopted the stage name of Florence Nelson, seemingly using the name of her childhood home.

On 28 July 1891, at St Mary’s Church, Sunbury-on-Thames, under her real name of Fielder, Nelson married John Alec Atkin, a theatrical manager. Both described their fathers as gentlemen.

In 1904, Nelson starred in An Actor’s Romance by Theodore Kremer, which opened at the Camden Theatre on 8 February 1904 and toured after that.

In 1905, she appeared at the Gaiety Theatre, Hastings, in The Girl from Japan, a musical play by Wilfred Carr and Colet Dare, playing Lady Pilpington.

There were no children of Nelson’s marriage, and her husband died in 1907. In 1911, Nelson was a widow living alone at 23, Ranelagh Mansions, a flat in Parsons Green, Fulham, and described herself as a Stage Actress.

The British film industry began to take off in earnest in 1915, and in 1916 Nelson appeared in four films, including A Fair Impostor. Several more followed in the years up to 1928.

Still using her married name of Emma Florence Atkin, and still of 23, Ranelagh Mansions, Nelson died in 1953 in Tooting Bec Hospital, aged 88. Probate on her estate, valued at £4,016, was granted to Gerard August Neville Pessers, actor manager.

== Filmography ==
- What the Curate Really Did (1905), as Gossip
- The Two Roads (1916), as Lady Maclaine
- The Economists (1916), as Mother
- A Fair Impostor (1916)
- Blood Tells, or, The Anti-Frivolity League (1916)
- Little Women (1917), as Aunt March
- Her Marriage Lines (1917), as Lady Ransley
- The Key of the World (1918), as Lady Boddy
- Angel Esquire (1919), as Mrs Reale
- The Disappearance of the Judge (1919), as Madame Julia
- The Lamp of Destiny (1919)
- Ernest Maltravers (1920), as Mrs Merton
- 'Orace (1921)
- His House in Order (1928)
