= Thursday's Child (1943 film) =

- Directed by: Rodney Ackland
- Written by: Rodney Ackland
- Based on: Thursday's Child by Donald Macardle
- Produced by: John Argyle
- Starring: Sally Ann Howes; Wilfrid Lawson
- Cinematography: Desmond Dickinson
- Edited by: Flora Newton
- Music by: Charles Williams
- Color process: Black and white
- Production company: Associated British Picture Corporation
- Distributed by: Pathé Pictures Ltd.
- Release dates: 24 March 1943 (London); 16 August 1943 (United Kingdom); 27 November 1946 (London-re-release); 6 August 1949 (Chicago-premiere); 3 September 1949 (New York City)
- Running time: 79 minutes
- Country: United Kingdom
- Language: English

Thursday's Child is a 1943 British comedy-drama film directed by Rodney Ackland and starring Sally Ann Howes and Wilfrid Lawson. It was written by Ackland based on the 1941 novel of same title by Donald Macardie, and produced by John Argyle for the Associated British Picture Corporation.

== Synopsis ==
A young girl, Fennis Wilson, is cast in a film which launches her career and makes her an overnight star – the very thing her older sister desperately wants.

But stardom is the furthest thing from 12-year-old Fennis' mind; she is introspective and intellectual and has other goals for her life. When the hit film falls in her lap, it creates a situation that threatens to tear the family apart, while Fennis just wants everyone to be happy – especially herself.

== Cast ==
- Sally Ann Howes as Fennis Wilson
- Wilfrid Lawson as Frank Wilson
- Kathleen O'Regan as Ellen Wilson
- Stewart Granger as David Penley
- Eileen Bennett as Phoebe Wilson
- Marianne Davis as Gloria Dewey
- Gerhard Kempinski as Rudi Kauffmann
- Felix Aylmer as Mr. Keith
- Margaret Yarde as Mrs. Chard
- Vera Bogetti as Madame Felicia
- Percy Walsh as Charles Lennox
- Michael Allen as Jim Wilson
- Margaret Drummond as Wendy Keith
- Ronald Shiner as Joe
- Anthony Holles as Roy Todd

== Casting ==
Thursday's Child was the first film for Howes, a neighbour of Ackland's. She auditioned and was chosen for the part over two hundred other girls.

== Reception ==
The Monthly Film Bulletin wrote: "This is a most satisfying film with a strong plot based on Donald Macardle's novel. It has been very ably directed by Rodney Ackland, whose first big film this is. He introduces excellent satire on the studio world and handles his situations with a sure hand. Fennis Wilson is also played by a newcomer, Sally Ann Howes. Both she and Eileen Bennett, who plays the part of her elder sister, have rather harsh recorded voices, but both (and especially the former) put real emotion into their parts. The father and the mother are played by Wilfrid Lawson and Kathleen O'Regan. Both build up a sense of character as they are caught in the ever deepening turns of petty deception and cross purposes that lends such strength to the plot. The rest of the cast are moulded by the director so as to fit into a coherent and convincing pattern."

Kine Weekly wrote: "Rodney Ackland, the author and director, is obviously a person of intelligence and perception, but in his framing and handling of the story he attempts too much. The leading characters are kept moving between the film studio and the home, but with few exceptions their perambulations lead nowhere in particular. Camera angles and satirical studio asides are all too frequently permitted to detract from the hectic child study. Its appeal rests almost entirely on Sally Ann Howes' ingratiating, if immature, portrayal."

The Daily Film Renter wrote: "Though well acted by little Sally Ann Howes, the picture is so mild as to plot it will interest only the mothers and spinsters who come in the afternoon. Its story is a very small scale storm in a surprisingly small austerity tea cup. ... The queer film people and the peeps behind the scenes have their entertaining moments, and the little heroine has plenty of charm and naturalness even if her role does not make any striking demands. As to the rest, the production is so suburban in its approach to its subject it will cut little ice with those who want a solid evening's entertainment."
