= The King's Cup =

1933 film

- Chili Bouchier & Harry Milton
- Directed by: Donald Macardle; Herbert Wilcox; Robert Cullen; Alan Cobham (Flying Scenes Co-ordinator)
- Written by: Alan Cobham
- Produced by: Herbert Wilcox
- Starring: Chili Bouchier; Harry Milton; William Kendall
- Cinematography: Freddie Young
- Music by: Lew Stone
- Production company: Herbert Wilcox Productions (for) British & Dominions Film Corporation
- Distributed by: Woolf & Freedman Film Service (Uk)
- Release date: January 1933
- Running time: 76 minutes
- Country: United Kingdom
- Language: English

The King's Cup is a 1933 British drama film directed by Alan Cobham, Donald Macardle, Herbert Wilcox and Robert Cullen and starring Chili Bouchier, Harry Milton and William Kendall. The film is named after the King's Cup air race, established by King George V in 1922 as an endurance race across Britain, to encourage development in engine design and the sport of aviation. Bouchier and Milton were married at the time the film was made.

== Plot summary ==
A pilot who has lost his nerve following an accident regains it after meeting a woman and goes on to win a major air race.

== Cast ==
- Chili Bouchier as Betty Conway
- Harry Milton as Dick Carter
- William Kendall as Captain Richards
- Rene Ray as Peggy
- Tom Helmore as Ronnie
- Lewis Shaw as Peter
- Sydney King as Crasher
- Leila Page as Lena
- Syd Crossley as Crossley
- Lew Stone as himself

== Critical reception ==
Film Weekly wrote: "It lacks punch, but it pleasantly entertaining most of the time, with a good air race climax.

Kine Weekly wrote: "Alan Cobham's narrative is rather artless, but it provides modest diversion until the actual race is staged. It is in this department that the picture shines, for the contest is thrilling and cleverly conceived, and carries excitement and suspense which completely atone for the early dramatic weaknesses. Judged as aerial entertainment the film is a sound piece of work and represents good popular stuff for all classes."

The Daily Film Renter wrote: "Narrative slender, but abundance of superb aerial sequences and excellently staged crash inject necessary punch. Suspense values whip closing reels into exciting tempo. Film that should prove satisfying to all popular demands. It is eminently satisfying to find a British sporting event as a background for a talkie, and there are few events more suitable for picture purposes than the famous King's Cup race, which is depicted here in a series of magnificently photographed shots. The slenderness of the narrative can be overlooked in view of these stirring scenes."

TV Guide gave the film one out of four stars, and wrote, "the novelty of four directors did nothing out of the ordinary in terms of what appears on the screen."

The Cinema Museum noted "a tantalizing glimpse of the [Brooklands] airfield and some of the flying that took place there before the Second World War."
