= Donald Macardle =

Irish actor and writer (1900–1984)

- Born: Donald Frederick Macardle; 12 November 1900
- Died: 25 May 1984 (aged 83)
- Occupations: Actor; writer; businessman
- Spouse: Enid Valnette Morgan (m. 1934)

Donald Frederick Macardle (12 November 1900 – 25 May 1984) was an Irish film and stage actor and writer. He also directed the 1933 film The King's Cup.

Macardle retired from acting and became a businessman. He married the actress Enid Valnette Morgan in 1934.

Macardle died on 25 May 1984 at the age of 83.

== Filmography ==
Actor

- Wee MacGregor's Sweetheart (1922)
- The Fair Maid of Perth (1923)
- The Loves of Mary, Queen of Scots (1923)
- The Gay Corinthian (1924)
- The Kensington Mystery (1924)
- Nell Gwyn (1926)
- Mumsie (1927)
- The Guns of Loos (1927)
- A Light Woman (1928)
- The Bondman (1928)

Screenwriter

- Carnival (1931)
- Thursday's Child (1943)

Director

- The King's Cup (1933)
