= It Is for England =

- Directed by: Laurence Cowen
- Written by: Laurence Cowen
- Produced by: Union Jack Company; The Admiralty
- Starring: Helene Gingold; Percy Moran; Margaret Shelley
- Distributed by: Phillips & Carroll (UK); Gaumont British Distributors (UK 1918, rerelease)
- Release date: November 1916
- Running time: 10 reels(1916); 5 reels(1918 rerelease)
- Country: UK
- Language: Silent..English

It Is for England is a 1916 silent film propaganda war drama written and directed by Laurence Cowen. It is also called The Hidden Hand.

It is preserved at the Library of Congress.

== Cast ==
- Helene Gingold – Reverend Christian St. George
- Percy Moran – Lt. Stephen English RN
- Margaret Shelley – Mary Marshall
- Thomas Canning – John Marshall MP
- R. Courtland – Percy Marshall
- Lionel d'Aragon – Sir Charles Rosenbaum Bart MP
- Gilbert Parker – Himself (*as Sir Gilbert Parker)
- Leonard Shepherd – The Kaiser
- Roy Travers – The Kaiser's Foreign Secretary
