= The Disappearance of the Judge =

1919 British film by Alexander Butler

- Directed by: Alexander Butler
- Written by: Guy Thorne (novel)
- Starring: James Lindsay; Florence Nelson; Mark Melford
- Release date: 1919
- Country: United Kingdom
- Language: English

The Disappearance of the Judge is a British silent motion picture of 1919 directed by Alexander Butler.

== Plot ==
A judge is kidnapped by a German gang to steal aero-engine plans. The judge's twin takes his place.

== Cast ==
- James Lindsay
- Florence Nelson, as Madame Julia
- Mark Melford
