= Pallard the Punter =

- Directed by: J.L.V. Leigh
- Written by: George Pearson
- Based on: Grey Timothy by Edgar Wallace
- Starring: Jack Leigh; Heather Thatcher; Lionel d'Aragon; Cecil Morton York
- Production company: Gaumont British Picture Corporation
- Distributed by: Gaumont British Distributors
- Release date: January 1919
- Country: United Kingdom
- Languages: Silent; English intertitles

Pallard the Punter is a 1919 British silent sports crime film directed by J.L.V. Leigh and starring Jack Leigh, Heather Thatcher and Lionel d'Aragon. It was based on the 1913 novel Grey Timothy by Edgar Wallace, set in the world of horse racing. It was made by British Gaumont at Lime Grove Studios in Shepherd's Bush.

== Cast ==
- Jack Leigh as Brian Pallard
- Heather Thatcher as Gladys Callender
- Lionel d'Aragon as Lord Pinlow
- Cecil Morton York as Peter Callender
- Cyril Smith as Horace Callender

== See also ==
- List of films about horses

== Bibliography ==
- Warren, Patricia. British Film Studios: An Illustrated History. Batsford, 2001.
