= Heroes of the Mine (1913 film) =

- Directed by: George Pearson
- Written by: L.C. MacBean; George Pearson
- Production company: Big Ben Films-Union
- Distributed by: Pathé Pictures International
- Release date: October 1913
- Country: United Kingdom
- Languages: Silent; English intertitles

Heroes of the Mine is a 1913 British silent drama film directed by George Pearson and starring Percy Moran and Lionel d'Aragon.

== Partial cast ==
- Percy Moran as Frank Conway
- Lionel d'Aragon as Dudley Hamilton

== Bibliography ==
- Quinlan, David. The Illustrated Guide to Film Directors. Batsford, 1983.
