= Adrienne Dore =

American actress (1907–1992)

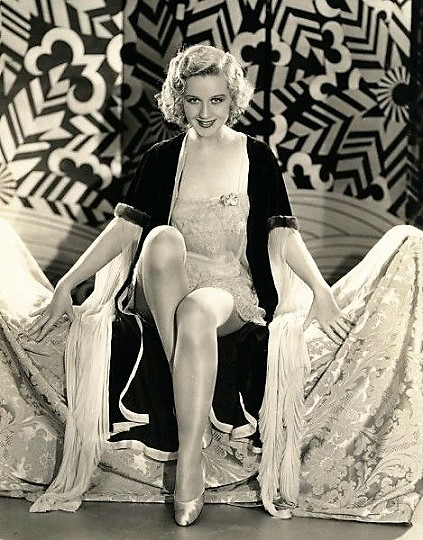
- Dore in an Elmer Fryer photo, 1932
- Born: Elizabeth Himmelsbach; May 22, 1907; Coeur d'Alene, Idaho, U.S.
- Died: November 26, 1992 (aged 85); Los Angeles, California, U.S.
- Other name: Adrienne Doré
- Occupations: Actress; model
- Years active: 1918–1934
- Spouse: Burt Kelly (m. 1933; died 1983)

Adrienne Dore (born Elizabeth Himmelsbach; May 22, 1907 – November 26, 1992) was an American actress, model, and beauty pageant winner. She was first runner-up in the Miss America 1925 pageant, competing as Miss Los Angeles. Dore went on to have a modest career in motion pictures before retiring in 1934.

== Early life and education ==
Adrienne Dore was born Elizabeth Himmelsbach in Coeur d'Alene, Idaho, to Louis Joseph Himmelsbach and Edith Estelle Kell. The family moved to Yakima and then Seattle, Washington, where she attended school at a convent. She performed in her first musical there at age three. Her education at Forrest Ridge Convent was in general studies but she focused on dancing and the theater.

== Career ==
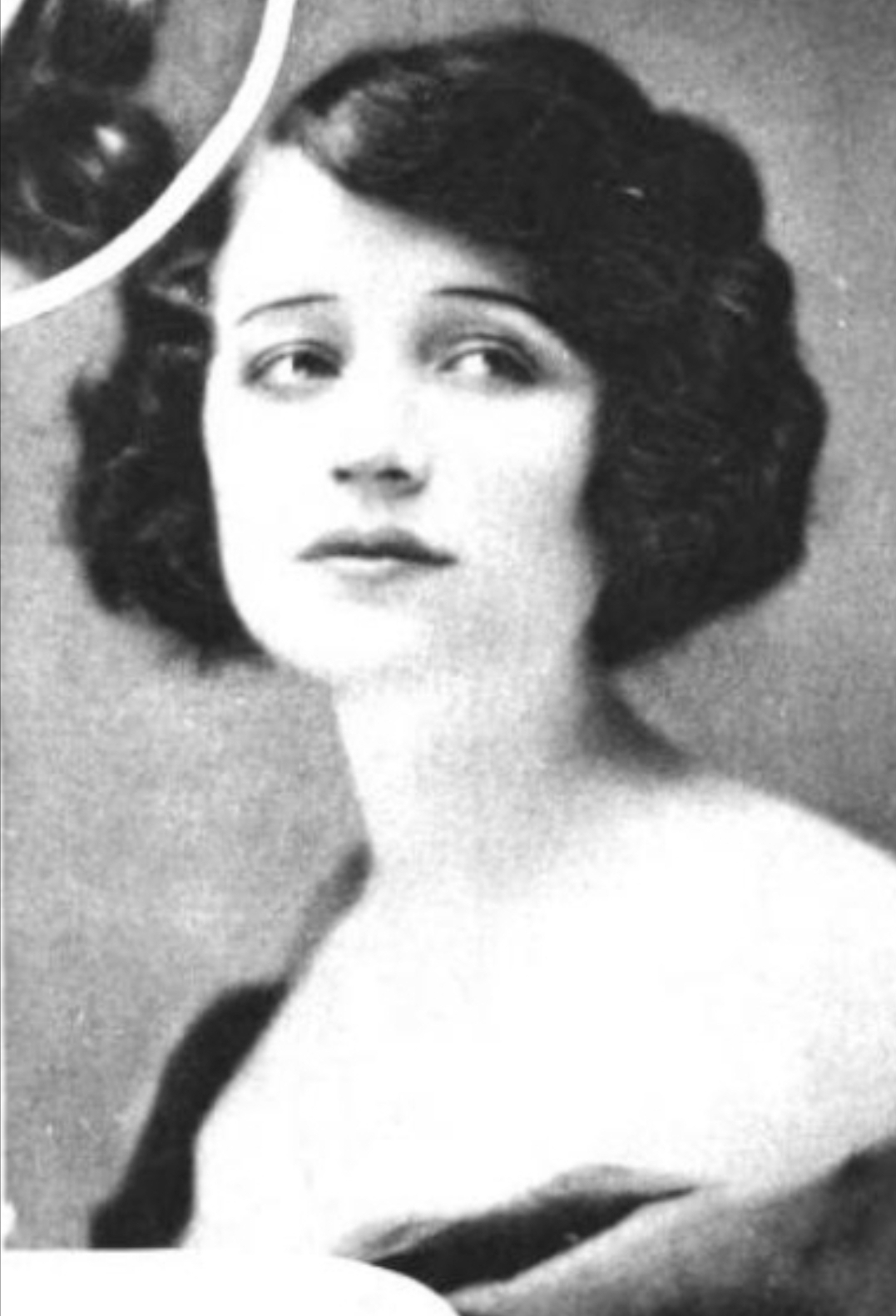
Dore in Theatre Magazine, January 1921

Dore moved to New York City, and pursued a career in acting under the name Adrienne Doré. She was a singer in the musical revue "Elliott, Comstock, and Gest", performing at the Cocoanut Grove, a nightclub located on the roof of the Century Theatre. She competed in the Miss Los Angeles Beauty contest in 1925, winning, and went on to the Miss America pageant, placing second in the competition. The contestants signed promissory contracts for film appearances with the Famous Players–Lasky Corporation upon winning; Dore's was with Universal Pictures for 5 years.

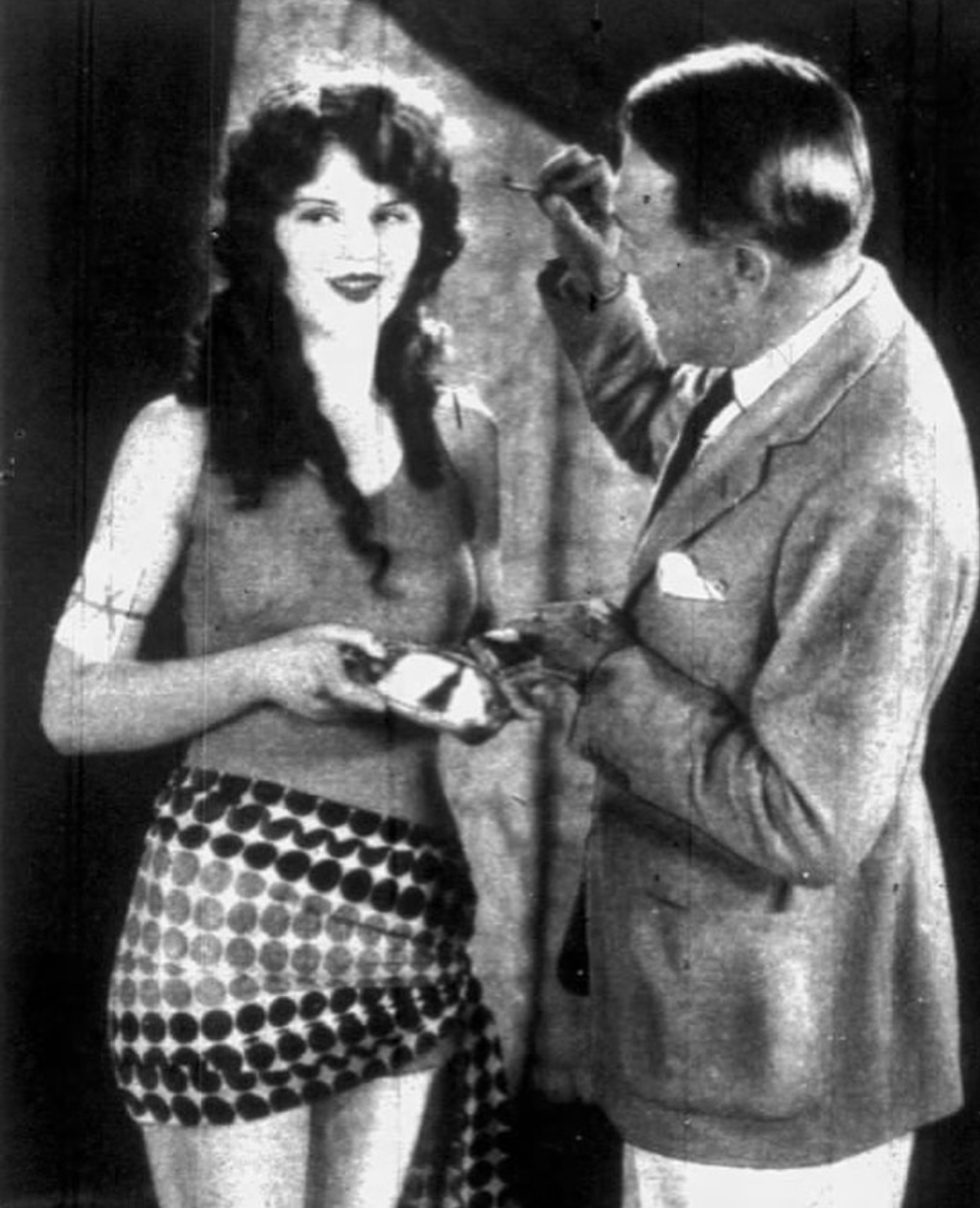
Dore and Edmund Goulding photographed for a scene in Sally, Irene and Mary (1925)

Dore returned to Los Angeles where she began acting in uncredited roles in silent pictures and two reelers such as Johnny's Week End and Adam's Eve, before moving on to full feature talkies. First receiving top billing in minor pictures like Beyond London Lights (1928), then continuing with minor roles alongside such stars as Clara Bow in The Wild Party (1929). In 1931, she obtained a contract with Warner Bros., and had supporting roles in Union Depot (1932) and The Rich Are Always with Us (1932) with Bette Davis. She met and married independent or B film producer Burt Kelly, who, along with Sam Bischoff and William Saal, headed KBS productions. Dore's last role was in Undercover Men, a 1934 Kelly film.

== Later life ==
Dore and Kelly remained married until his death in 1983. Dore died at the age of 85 in Chippewa Falls, Wisconsin. She is buried without marker in Forest Hill Cemetery in Chippewa Falls, Wisconsin.

== Filmography ==
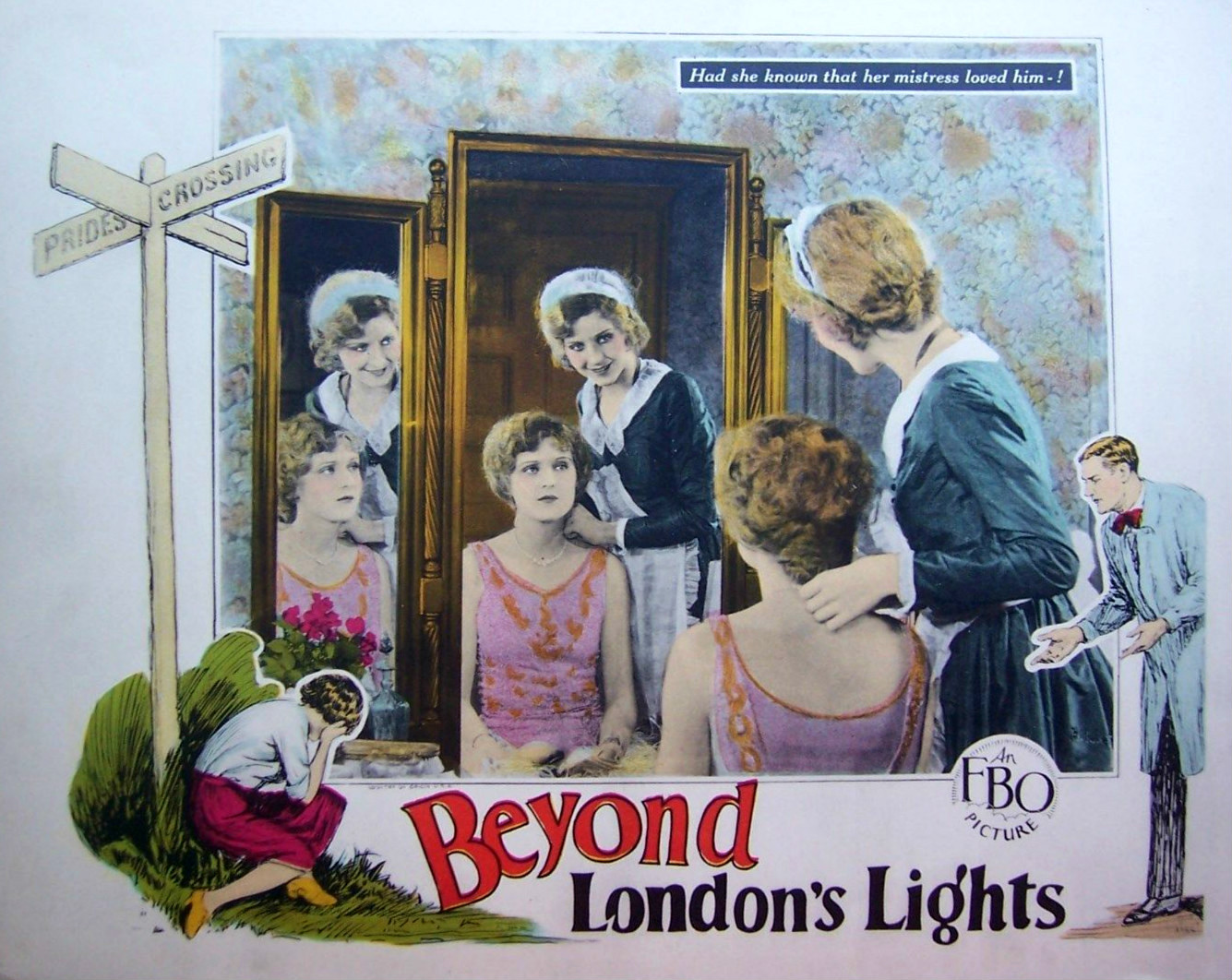
Dore as maid Kitty Carstairs on a lobby card for Beyond London Lights (1928)

Year	Film	Role	Ref	Notes
1925	Sally, Irene and Mary			Uncredited, scene cut
1926	Love's Hurdle			Short
1928	The Valley of Hunted Men	Minor role		Uncredited
1928	The Swim Princess	Minor role		Uncredited
1928	Beyond London Lights	Kitty Carstairs		Lost film
1928	Wife Trouble			Short
1929	Pep Up	Adrienne Wood		Short
1929	Smart Steppers			Short
1929	Time to Expire			Short
1929	The Wild Party	Babs		Credited as Adrienne Doré
1929	Delicious and Refreshing			Short
1929	Peaceful Alley	A Mission Girl		Short
1929	Adam's Eve	Irene		Short
1929	Pointed Heels	Kay Wilcox		Technicolor version of the film survives at UCLA Film and Television Archive
1930	Hello, Baby	Adrienne		Short
1930	Johnny's Week End			Short
1932	Union Depot	Sadie		
1932	The Famous Ferguson Case	Antoinette "Toni" Martin		
1932	Two Seconds	Annie		Uncredited
1932	Alias the Doctor			
1932	Street of Women	Frances		
1932	The Expert			
1932	Play Girl	The Reno Girl		Uncredited
1932	Gentleman for a Day			
1932	The Rich Are Always with Us	Allison Adair		
1932	The Thirteenth Guest	Winston's Date		Uncredited
1932	The Girl from Calgary	Lulu, Darrell's secretary		Uncredited
1933	Love, Honor, and Oh Baby!	Louise		
1934	Undercover Men	Betty Winton		Final film role

== Bibliography ==
- Mayne, Judith. Directed by Dorothy Arzner. Indiana University Press, 1994.
