= Lionel d'Aragon =

British actor (1863–1941)

- Born: 5 July 1863; Paris, France
- Died: 1941 (aged 77 - 78); Camberwell, London
- Occupation: Actor

Lionel d'Aragon (5 July 1863 - 1941) was a British actor of the silent era. He was born in Paris, France and died in Camberwell, London.

== Selected filmography ==
- Heroes of the Mine (1913)
- A Fair Impostor (1916)
- The Valley of Fear (1916)
- It Is for England (1916)
- Little Women (1917)
- Drink (1917)
- The Sorrows of Satan (1917)
- The Key of the World (1918)
- The Great Impostor (1918)
- Pallard the Punter (1919)
- Love's Boomerang (1922)
- A Lost Leader (1922)
- The Spanish Jade (1922)
- Guy Fawkes (1923)
- Lily of the Alley (1923)
- Curfew Must Not Ring Tonight (1923)
- The Virgin Queen (1923)
- The Loves of Mary, Queen of Scots (1923)
- The Fair Maid of Perth (1923)
- Mist in the Valley (1923)
- The Flying Fifty-Five (1924)
- Adventurous Youth (1928)
