= The Key of the World =

- Directed by: J.L.V. Leigh
- Written by: Dorin Craig (novel); Helen Blizzard
- Starring: Eileen Molyneux; Heather Thatcher; Eric Harrison; Lionel d'Aragon
- Production company: Gaumont British Picture Corporation
- Distributed by: Gaumont British Distributors
- Release date: October 1918
- Country: United Kingdom
- Languages: Silent; English intertitles

The Key of the World is a 1918 British silent romance film direcred by J.L.V. Leigh and starring Eileen Molyneux, Heather Thatcher and Eric Harrison. It was made by British Gaumont at Lime Grove Studios in Shepherd's Bush. It was based on a novel by Dorin Craig.

== Cast ==
- Eileen Molyneux as Honesty Vethick
- Heather Thatcher as Dina Destin
- Eric Harrison as Garth Berry
- Pat Somerset as Evelyn Carew
- Lionel d'Aragon as Liston Crawley
- Cecil Morton York as Adam
- Hamilton Stewart as Earl of Carne
- Florence Nelson as Lady Boddy
- Frank Harris as Farmer Berry

== Bibliography ==
- Warren, Patricia. British Film Studios: An Illustrated History. Batsford, 2001.
