= A Fair Impostor (novel) =

1909 novel

- Author: Charles Garvice
- Language: English
- Publication date: 1909
- Publication place: United Kingdom
- Media type: Print

A Fair Impostor is a 1909 novel by the British writer Charles Garvice. It was adapted into a 1916 film of the same title directed by Alexander Butler.

== Bibliography ==
- Low, Rachael. The History of British Film, Volume III: 1914-1918. Routledge, 1997.
