= Charles Garvice =

British writer (1850–1920)

Charles Andrew Garvice
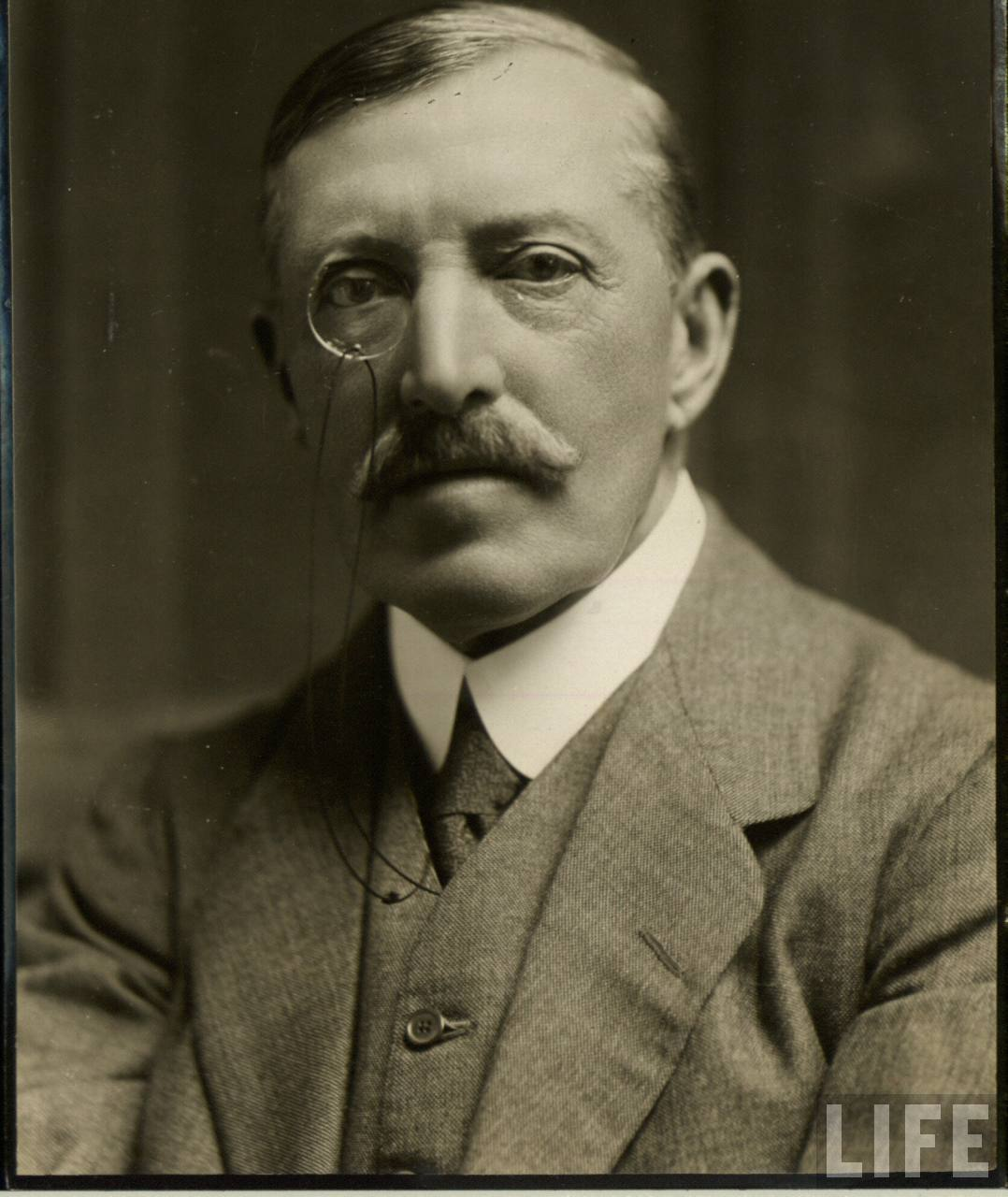
- Charles Andrew Garvice's portrait
- Born: 24 August 1850; Stepney, London, England, UK
- Died: 1 March 1920 (aged 69)
- Occupation: writer
- Spouse: Elizabeth Jones
- Children: 8
- Writing career
- Pen name: Charles Garvice, Caroline Hart, Chas. Garvice, Charles Gibson
- Language: English
- Period: 1875–1919
- Genre: Romance

Charles Garvice (24 August 1850 – 1 March 1920 (Note: According to Philip Waller, there is "some mystery" as to the exact day of death. See footnote #1 pg. 681)) was a prolific British writer of over 150 romance novels, who also used the female pseudonym Caroline Hart. He was a popular author in the United Kingdom and United States, and his work was translated around the world. He was ‘the most successful novelist in England’, according to Arnold Bennett in 1910. He published novels selling over seven million copies worldwide by 1914, and since 1913 he was selling 1.75 million books annually, a pace which he maintained at least until his death. Despite his enormous success, he was poorly received by literary critics, and is almost forgotten today.

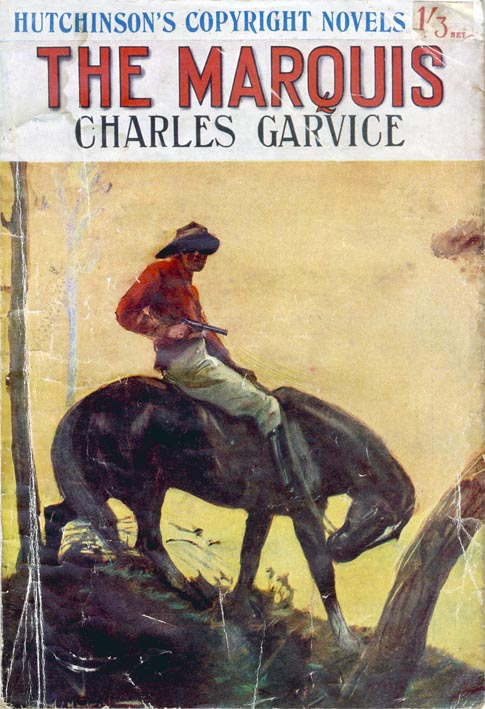
The Marquis (1895)

== Biography ==
Until recently not much has been known about Garvice's personal life. The Oxford Dictionary of National Biography said "Little .. is known of his family origins and personal life. Obscurity envelops [him]." John Sutherland in the Companion to Victorian Literature said "Little is known of Garvice's life."

In 2010, English freelance author and editor Steve Holland did an exhaustive search of baptismal records, genealogy databases and census records to build a picture of his early life. He found that Charles Andrew Garvice was born on 24 August 1850 in or near Stepney, London, England to Mira Winter and Andrew John Garvice. In 1872, he married Elizabeth Jones, and had two sons and six daughters. Garvice suffered a cerebral hemorrhage on 21 February 1920 and was in a coma for eight days until his death on 1 March 1920. He is buried in Richmond Cemetery.

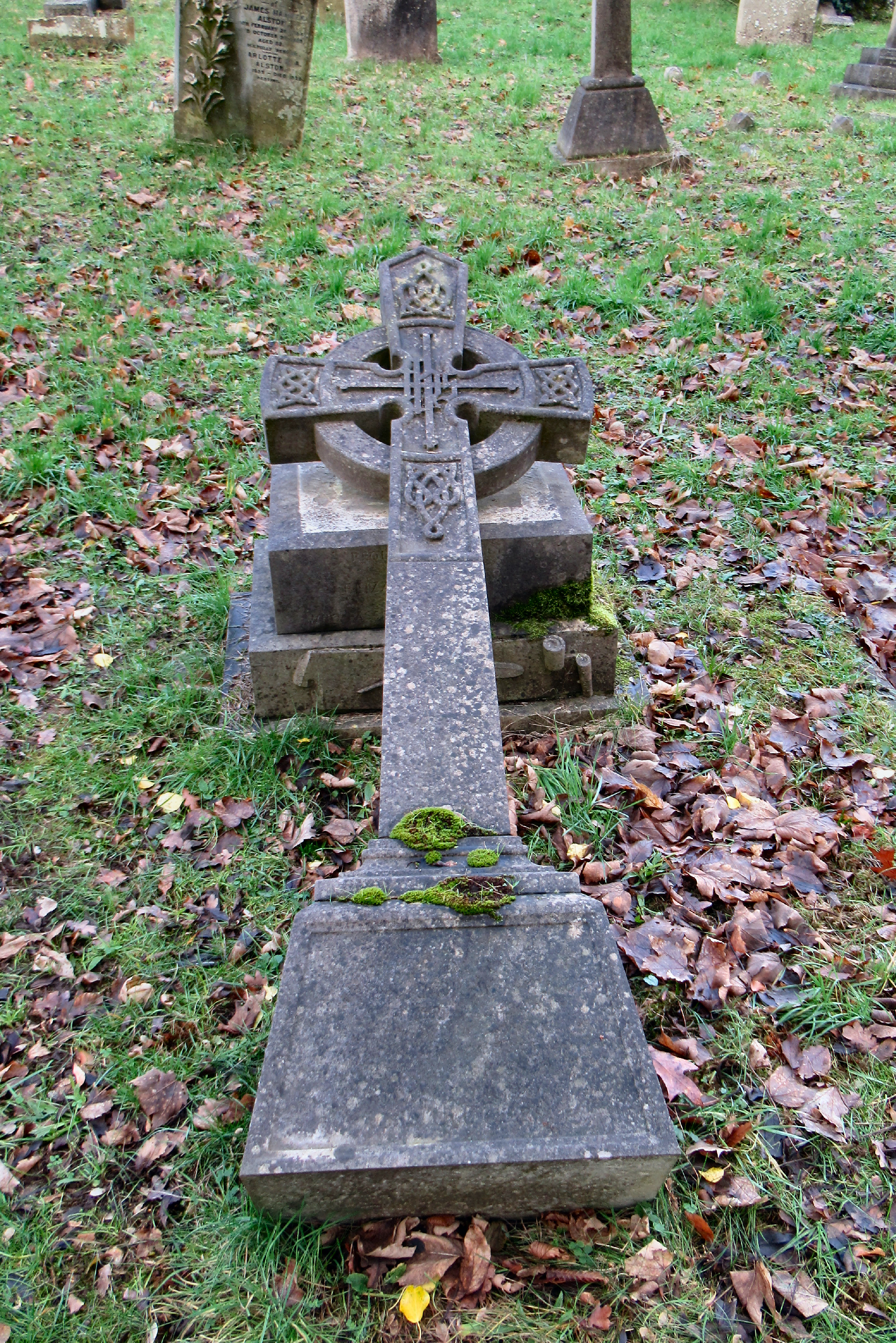
Richmond Cemetery

=== Writing career ===
Garvice got his professional start as a journalist. His first novel, Maurice Durant (1875), was marginally successful in serialized form, but when published as a novel, it was a "dismal failure". He concluded it was too long and too expensive for popular sales - this early experience taught him about the business side of writing. He would spend the next 23 years writing serialized stories for the periodicals of George Munro. Magazine stories included A Modern Juliet, Woven in Fate's Loom, On Love's Altar, His Love So True, and A Relenting Fate. The unexpected success of Just a Girl (1895) in America brought him attention in the UK and encouragement to resume his career as a novelist - from then on every novel he published became a best-seller in England. He reworked many of his magazine stories as novels, and by 1913, Garvice was selling 1.75 million books annually, a pace which he maintained at least until his death. Garvice published over 150 novels, selling over seven million copies worldwide by 1914. Just a Girl was filmed in 1916. According to Garvice's agent Eveleigh Nash, Garvice's books were as "numerous in the shops and on the railway bookstalls as the leaves of Vallombrosa." He was 'the most successful novelist in England', according to Arnold Bennett in 1910.

In 1904, capitalizing on his wealth as a best-selling author, Garvice bought a farm estate in Devon, where he wanted to work the land in "the genuine, dirty, Devonshire fashion." Like the characters in his novels, he romantically dreamed of a life happily ever after and lord of a country manor. He wrote about it in his one non-fiction book A Farm in Creamland.

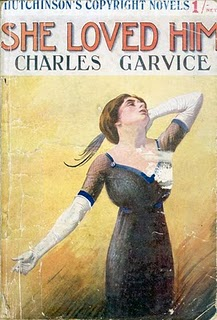
She Loved Him (1895)

=== Critical reception ===
Garvice's novels were formulaic predictable melodramas. They usually told the story of a virtuous woman overcoming obstacles and achieving a happy ending. He could crank out 12 or more novels a year, but "Little beyond the particulars of the heroines' hair color differentiates one from another," says modern critic Laura Sewell Matter, who found his stories "boring". Likewise contemporary critics were almost unanimous in their disregard, but he was hard to ignore because of his best-selling status. As the London Times wrote in his obituary:

"It cannot be said that his work was of a high order; but criticism is disregarded by his own frank attitude towards the possibility of the permanence of his literary reputation. His answer to a captious friend who seemed solicitous to disabuse him on this score was merely to point with a gesture to the crowds on the seaside beach reading. "All my books," he said: "they are all reading my latest." It was a true estimate.

In contemplating why his novels were so popular, Laura Sewell Matter said:

"[Garvice] endured more public ridicule [by critics] than any decent human being deserves. What [Thomas] Moult and other critics failed to acknowledge, but what Garvice knew and honored, are the ways so many of us live emotionally attenuated states, during times of peace as well as war. Stories like the one Garvice wrote may be low art, may not be art at all. They may offer consolation or distraction rather than provocation and insight. But many people find provocation enough in real life, and so they read for something else. One cannot have contempt for Garvice without also having some level of contempt for common humanity, for those readers - not all of whom can be dismissed as simpletons - who may not consciously believe in what they reading, but who read anyway because they know: a story can be a salve."

W. Somerset Maugham, who met him at The Garrick, described Garvice as "a modest, unassuming, well-mannered man. I am convinced that when he sat down to turn out another of his innumerable books, he wrote as one inspired, with all his heart and soul."

== Bibliography ==
Garvice was particularly popular in the United States, producing over 150 novels, twenty-five of which were written under the pseudonym Caroline Hart.

=== As Charles Garvice ===
- Maurice Durant. London, A. Smith, 3 vols., 1875; New York, Ogilvie, n.d.; in 2 vols., as The Eyes of Love, New York, Street & Smith (New Eagle ser. 347), n.d., and The Hearts of Youth, New York, Street & Smith (new Eagle ser. 348), n.d.
- Twixt Smile and Tear. New York, G. Munro, 1887.
- ’’Heart for Heart’’. New York, A. L. Burt Company, 1897.
- Her Ransom. New York, F. M. Lupton (Chimney Corner ser. 31), n..d.; New York, Street & Smith (Eagle Library 50), Feb 1898; as Her Ransom; or, Paid For!, Chicago, M. A. Donohue, n.d.
- Claire. New York, F. M. Lupton (Chimney Corner ser. 33), c.1890; as Claire; or, The Mistress of Court Regina, New York, J. S. Ogilvie (Charles Garvice 2), 1898; New York, G. Munro's Sons, 1899.
- Lorrie; or, Hollow Gold. New York, F. P. Lupton (Chimney Corner ser. 51), n.d.; New York, Street & Smith (Eagle Library 85), 1898; London, Hodder & Stoughton, 1910.
- Her Heart's Desire. New York, F. M. Lupton (Chimney Corner ser. 58), n.d.; New York, Street & Smith (Eagle Library 41), 1897; London, Sands, 1900.
- Leslie's Loyalty; or, His Love So True. New York, F. M. Lupton (Chimney Corner ser. 62), 18??; New York, G. Munro's Sons, 1898; Chicago, M. A. Donohue, 1900; London, Hodder & Stoughton, 1911; New York, Street & Smith (New Eagle ser. 17), n.d.; as His Perfect Trust, New York, Street & Smith (Eagle Library 69), 1898?; in 2 vols., as His Perfect Trust, Cleveland, Arthur Westbrook, c.1910, and Her Love So True, Cleveland, Arthur Westbrook, 1910.
- Out of the Past. New York, Street & Smith (Eagle Series #79), October 29, 1900; There is a note on title verso from the publisher that the book had previously been published mistakenly as Marjorie's Fate by Bertha M. Clay, but they were correcting this due to information received "from the best authority".
- A Passion Flower. New York, F. M. Lupton (Chimney Corner ser. 68), n.d.; London, Hodder & Stoughton, 1910.
- Sweet Cymbeline. New York, F. M. Lupton (Chimney Corner ser. 74), n.d.; London, Newnes, 1911; New York, Street & Smith (New Eagle ser. 102), n.d.
- A Wilful Maid. New York, F. M. Lupton (Chimney Corner ser. 88, n.d.; New York, Street & Smith (Eagle ser. 95), n.d.; London, Newnes, 1911; as Phillippa; or. The Wilful Maid, Chicago, M. A. Donohue, 1900.
- Lady Norah; or, The Earl’s Heir. New York, F. M. Lupton (Chimney Corner ser. 97), n.d.; as The Earl's Heir; or, Lady Norah, New York, Street & Smith (New Eagle ser. 231), n.d.; Chicago, M. A. Donohue, n.d.; as The Earl's Daughter. London, Hodder & Stoughton, 1910.
- Leola Dale's Fortune. New York, F. M. Lupton (Chimney Corner ser. 105), n.d.; New York, Street & Smith (New Ealge ser. 223), 1901; London, Hutchinson, 1910.
- The Lady of Darracourt. New York, F. M. Lupton (Chimney Corner ser. 127), n.d.; New York, Street & Smith (Eagle ser.), 1902; London, Hodder & Stoughton, 1911.
- Stella Newton. New York, F. M. Lupton (Arm Chair Library 122), n.d.
- Married at Sight. New York, G. Munro's Sons (Laurel Library), 1889.
- Elaine. New York, G. Munro's Sons (Laurel Library 4), 1890; London, Newnes, 1911.
- Shadow of Her Life. New York, Grosset & Dunlap, 1890.
- Jeanne; or, Barriers Between. New York, F. M. Lupton (Chimney Corner ser. 143), 1890?; as Jeanne; or, Love’s Triumph, New York, Street & Smith (New Eagle ser. 267), 1902.
- Who Was the Heir?. New York, F. M. Lupton (Chimney Corner ser. 148), 1890.
- Better Than Life. New York, G. Munro's Sons (Seaside Library 11), 1891; London, Hodder & Stoughton, 1910; as Better Than Life; or, Her Bitter Cup, New York, Street & Smith (Eagle ser. 531), n.d.
- On Love's Altar. New York, Munro, 1892; London, R. E. King, 1908; as A Wasted Love; or On Love’s Altar, New York, Street & Smith (Eagle Library 24), 1897; as A Wasted Love; or On Love’s Altar [with Florry's Lesson], Chicago, M. A. Donohue, 1904; as A Wasted Love; or, On Love’s Altar by Caroline Hart, Cleveland, Arthur Westbrook (Hart ser.), n.d.
- A Life's Mistake. New York, G. Munro's Sons (Laurel Library 19), 1892; London, Hutchinson, 1910.
- Once in a Life. New York, G. Munro's Sons, 1892; London, Hodder & Stoughton, 1910; as Once in a Life; or, The Secret of Her Heart, New York, A. L. Burt, n.d..
- Paid For! New York, Munro, 1892; London, Hutchinson, 1909.
- In Cupid's Chains. New York, G. Munro's Sons, 1893; London, Sands, 1902; as In Cupid’s Chains; or, A Slave For Life, New York, Street & Smith (New Eagle ser. 557), 1908.
- Twas Love's Fault. New York, A. L. Burt, 1893; as ‘Twas Love’s Fault; or, A Young Girl’s Trust, New York, Street & Smith (New Eagle ser. 548), n.d.
- Queen Kate. New York, G. Munro's Sons, 1894; London, Hodder & Stoughton, 1909; as Queen Kate; or, A Wilful Lassie, New York, Street & Smith (Eagle ser. 553), n.d.
- The Outcast of the Family. New York, A. L. Burt, 1894; as An Outcast of the Family, London, Sands, 1900.
- His Guardian Angel; or, Wild Margaret. Chicago, M. A. Donahue, 1894; London, Newnes, 1911.
- Only One Love. Chicago, M. A. Donahue (Alert Library 167), n.d. London, Hodder & Stoughton, 1910.
- Stella's Fortune; or, Love the Conqueror. Chicago, M. A. Donohue, n.d.; London, Hodder & Stoughton, 1912; New York, Street & Smith, n.d.; as The Sculptor's Wooing, New York, Ogilvie, n.d.
- A Woman’s Soul; or, Doris. Chicago, M. A. Donohue (Alert Library 162), n.d.; as A Woman’s Soul: Behind the Footlights, New York, J. S. Ogilvie (Railroad ser. 62), 1900.
- A Wounded Heart; or, Sweet as a Rose. Chicago, M. A. Donahue, n.d.; as Sweet as a Rose, London, Hutchinson, 1910.
- Just a Girl; or, The Strange Duchess. New York, A. L. Burt, 1895; as The Mistress of Court Regina, New York, Grosset & Dunlap, 1897; London, Hutchinson, 1909; as Just a Girl, illus. Warwick Goble. London, James Bowden, 1898; as An Innocent Girl, New York, Munro, 1898.
- The Marquis. New York, G. Munro's Sons (Laurel Library 21), 1895.
- The Price of Honour (as Charles Gibson). Cleveland, Arthur Westbrook, n.d.
- She Loved Him. New York, Grosset & Dunlap, 1895; London, Hutchinson, 1909; as Her Right to Love; or, She Loved Him by Caroline Hart, Cleveland, Arthur Westbrook (Hart ser.), n.d.
- By Devious Ways. New York, Grosset & Dunlap, 1896.
- A Coronet of Shame. New York, G. Munro's Sons (Laurel Library 30), 1896; London, Sands & Co., 1900.
- His Love So True. New York, Munro, 1896.
- Heart for Heart; or. Love’s Queer Pranks. New York, A. L. Burt, 1897.
- Sydney. A wilful young woman. New York, Street & Smith (Eagle ser. 70), 1897?
- The Story of a Passion. New York, G. Munro's Sons (Laurel Library 33), 1898; London, Hutchinson, 1908.
- A Modern Juliet; or, The Unknown Future. New York, G. Munro's Sons (Laurel Library 39), 1898; New York, A. L. Burt, 1898; London, Pearson, 1910.
- Nell of Shorne Mills; or, One Heart’s Burden. New York, A. L. Burt, 1898; London, Hutchinson, 1908.
- A Sample of Prejudice. New York, G. Munro's Sons, 1898.
- A Heritage of Hate; or, A Change of Heart. New York, A. L. Burt, 1899; London, Amalgamated Press, 1909.
- Love's Dilemma; or, Kate Meddon’s Lover. Chicago, M. A. Donahue, 1900; London, Hodder & Stoughton, 1917; as Love’s Dilemma; or, For an Earldom, New York, Street & Smith (Eagle ser. 280), n.d.; as For an Earldom, New York, Ogilvie, n.d.
- Love, The Tyrant. New York, G. Munro's Sons (Laurel Library 43), 1900; London, Hutchinson, 1905.
- Nance. London, Sands, 1900.
- At Love's Cost; or, Her Rival’s Triumph. New York, A. L. Burt, 1900?; London, Hutchinson, 1909.
- Farmer Holt's Daughter. New York, Federal Book Co., 1901.
- Maida: A Child of Sorrow. New York, A. L. Burt, 1901.
- Only a Girl's Love. New York, Street & Smith, 1901; London, Hodder & Stoughton, 1911; abridged (by Barbara Cartland), New York, Bantam Books, 1980.
- With All Her Heart; or, Love Begets Faith. New York, A. L. Burt, 1901; London, Newnes, 1910.
- Diana: For Her Only. New York, G. Munro's Sons, 1902; as For Her Only, New York, Street & Smith, 1902; London, Hodder & Stoughton, 1911.
- The Ashes of Love; or, Fickle Fortune. New York, J. S. Ogilvie (Railroad ser. 56), 1901?; in 2 vols. as The Ashes of Love, New York, Street & Smith (New Eagle ser. 360), n.d., and A Heart Triumphant, New York, Street & Smith (New Eagle ser. 361), n.d.
- Iris; or, A Martyred Love. New York, Street & Smith (New Eagle ser. 257), 1902?; London, Newnes, 1914; as A Martyred Love; or, The Heiress of Revels, Chicago, M. A. Donohue, 1902.
- The Heir of Vering; or, The Queen Lily. New York, Street & Smith (New Eagle ser. 296), 1902; London, Hutchinson, 1910.
- Woman's Soul. New York, Street & Smith, 1902.
- The Spring-Time of Love. New York, G. Munro's Sons, 1902; London, Hodder & Stoughton, 1910; as So Nearly Lost; or, Springtime of Love. New York, Street & Smith, n.d.
- So Fair, So False; or, A Soul’s Devotion. New York, Street & Smith (New Eagle ser. 272), 1902; as So Fair, So False; or. The Beauty of the Season, Chicago, M. A. Donohue, n.d.
- My Lady Pride. New York, Street & Smith (New Eagle ser. 283), 1902.
- Olivia; or, It was for Her Sake. New York, G. Munro's Sons (Laurel Library), 1902?; New York, Street & Smith (New Eagle ser. 268), 1902.
- Kyra's Fate; or, Love Knows No Bonds. New York, A. L. Burt, 1902; London, Hutchinson, 1908.
- The Usurper; or, Her Humble Lover. Chicago, M. A. Donohue (Laurel Library 110), 1902; as Her Humble Lover, Cleveland, Arthur Westbrook (All Star ser. 45), 1904.
- A Wounded Heart; or, Sweet as a Rose. New York, J. S. Ogilvie (Railroad ser. 66), 1902.
- Woven on Fate's Loom, and The Snowdrift. New York, Street & Smith (New Eagle ser. 312), 1903; as Woven on Fate’s Loom [with Florry's Lesson by M. T. Caldor], New York, F. P. Lupton (Leisure Hour Library 40), 1904.
- The Spider and the Fly; or, An Undesired Love: Violet. New York, J. S. Ogilvie (Charles Garvice ser. 22), 1903.
- Staunch of Heart; or, Adrien Leroy’s Sacrifice. New York, Street & Smith (Eagle ser. 318), 1903; as Adrien Leroy, London, Newnes, 1912; Cleveland, Arthur Westbrook (All Star ser. 1), n.d.
- Staunch as a Woman; or, Love’s Woe. New York, Street & Smith (New Eagle ser. 304), 1903; London, Hodder & Stoughton, 1910.
- Led by Love (sequel to Staunch as a Woman). New York, Street & Smith (New Eagle ser. 305), 1903.
- Linked by Fate; or, Not to be Bought. New York, A. L. Burt, 1903; London, Hutchinson, 1905.
- The Verdict of the Heart. 1903; London, Newnes, 1912; [with Farmer Holt’s Daughter] New York, Street & Smith (New Eagle ser. 630), 1909.
- A Girl of Spirit; or, Bound By Honor. New York, A. L. Burt, 1904; London, Hutchinson, 1906; New York, Street & Smith (New Eagle ser. 640), 1909.
- A Jest of Fate; or, Love’s Supreme Effort. New York, Munro, 1904; London, Newnes, 1909.
- Love Decides. London, Hutchinson, 1904.
- The Pride of Her Life. New York, Street & Smith (New Eagle ser. 367), 1904.
- Won by Love’s Valor (sequel to The Pride of Her Life). New York, Street & Smith (New Eagle ser. 368), 1904.
- Creatures of Destiny; or, Where Love Leads. New York, A. L. Burt, 1905.
- Edna's Secret Marriage; or. Love’s Champion. New York, A. L. Burt, 1905.
- She Trusted Him. New York, Grosset & Dunlap, 1905.
- Love and a Lie. New York, A. L. Burt, c.1905?; as Love and a Lie; or, The Heart of the Other Woman, New York, Street & Smith (New Eagle ser. 712), 1907.
- The Other Woman. New York, Street & Smith, 1905.
- When Love Meets Love; or, Cynthia’s Reward. New York, Street & Smith (New Eagle ser. 458), 1906.
- Diana's Destiny. New York, A. L. Burt, 1905; as Diana and Destiny, London, Hodder & Stoughton, 1906; as Diana’s Destiny; or, Won By Faith, New York, Street & Smith (New Eagle ser. 650), 1909.
- Where Love Leads. London, Hutchinson, 1907.
- When Love Is Young. New York, A. L. Burt, 1907; as When Love Was Young; or, The Crooked Way. New York, Street & Smith (New Eagle ser. 671), 1910.
- The Gold in the Gutter. London, Hutchinson, 1907; as Gold in the Gutter; or, A Love Unfolded, New York, Street & Smith (New Eagle ser. 679) 1910.
- Slave of the Lake. Chicago, Stein, 1908.
- Taming of Princess Olga. Chicago, Stein, 1908.
- Woman Decides. Chicago, Stein, 1908.
- My Lady of Snow. Chicago, Stein, 1908.
- Linnie. Chicago, Stein, 1908.
- Olivia and Others. London, Hutchinson, 1908.
- A Love Comedy; or, Behind the Scenes. Chicago, Stein, 1908; London, Hodder & Stoughton, 1912.
- Marcia Drayton. London, Newnes, 1908.
- The Female Editor of the “Milchester Trumpet”. Chicago, Max Stein (Atlantic Library), 1908.
- Leave Love to Itself. Chicago, Stein, 1908.
- The First and Last. Chicago, Max Stein (Atlantic Library), 1908.
- In the Matter of a Letter. Chicago, Stein, 1908.
- The Rugged Path. London, Hodder & Stoughton, 1908.
- In Wolf's Clothing. London, Hodder & Stoughton, 1908.
- Sacrifice to Art. Chicago, Max Stein, 1909.
- The Scribblers' Club. London, Hodder & Stoughton, 1909.
- The Fatal Ruby. London, Hodder & Stoughton, 1909; New York, Donald W. Newton, 1909.
- By Dangerous Ways. London, Amalgamated Press, 1909; New York, A. L. Burt, n.d.
- A Fair Impostor. London, Newnes, 1909.
- Barriers Between. London, Hodder & Stoughton, 1910.
- The Beauty of the Season. London, Hodder & Stoughton, 1910.
- Dulcie. London, Hodder & Stoughton, 1910.
- A Girl from the South. London, Cassell, 1910; as A Girl from the South; or, In Love’s Hands, New York, Street & Smith (New Eagle ser. 721), 1911.
- The Heart of a Maid. London, Hodder & Stoughton, 1910; as The Heart of a Maid; or, By Love’s Still Waters, New York, Street & Smith (New Eagle ser. 749), 1911.
- Floris. London, Hutchinson, 1910.
- Signa's Sweetheart. London, Hutchinson, 1910.
- Miss Estcourt. London, Hutchinson, 1911; as Miss Estcourt; or, Olive, New York, Street & Smith (New Eagle ser. 778), 1912.
- My Love Kitty. London, Hutchinson, 1911; as My Love Kitty; or, Her Heart’s Bondage, New York, Street & Smith (New Eagle ser. 775), 1912.
- That Strange Girl. London, Hutchinson, 1911.
- Violet. London, Hutchinson, 1911.
- Doris. London, Newnes, 1911.
- He Loves Me, He Loves Me Not. London, Hodder & Stoughton, 1911; in two vols., as He Loves Me; or, The Fatal Mistake, New York, Street & Smith (New Eagle ser. 327), n.d., and He Loves Me Not, New York, Street & Smith (New Eagle ser. 328), n.d.
- Lord of Himself. London, Hodder & Stoughton, 1911.
- The Other Girl. London, Hodder & Stoughton, 1911.
- Wicked Sir Dare. Cleveland, Arthur Westbrook (Hart ser. 87), 1911; London, C. A. Pearson, 1917.
- The Woman in It. London, Hodder & Stoughton, 1911; New York, Street & Smith (New Eagle ser. 758), 1911.
- Breta's Double. New York, Street & Smith, n.d.
- Imogene. New York, Street & Smith, n.d.
- Love for a Day. Philadelphia, Royal Publishing Co. (Charles Garvice ser. 19), n.d.
- Love of a Life Time. Philadelphia, Royal, n.d.
- Lucille. Chicago, M. A. Donohue, n.d.
- Out of the Past. New York, Street & Smith, n.d.
- The Price of Honor. Philadelphia, Royal, n.d.; as The Price of Honor; or, Beyond Compare, Cleveland, Arthur Westbrooks (All Star ser. 39), n.d.
- The Royal Signet. Philadelphia, Royal, n.d.
- Wasted Love. New York, Street & Smith, n.d.
- Nellie. New York, Street & Smith (New Eagle ser. 777), n.d. London, Hutchinson, 1913.
- Love in a Snare. London, Hodder & Stoughton, 1912.
- Fate. London, Newnes, 1912; New York, Ogilvie, 1913.
- Fickle Fortune. London, Newnes, 1912.
- In Fine Feathers. London, Hodder & Stoughton, 1912.
- Two Maids and a Man. London, Hodder & Stoughton, 1912; as Two Girls and a Man, London, Wright and Brown, 1937.
- Country Love. London, Hutchinson, 1912.
- Reuben. London, Hutchinson, 1912.
- The Girl Who Was True; or, A Change of Heart. New York, Street & Smith (New Eagle ser. 818), 1913.
- The Irony of Love; or, A Fatal Repentance. New York, Street & Smith (New Eagle ser. 826), 1913.
- The Loom of Fate. London, Newnes, 1913.
- The Woman's Way. London, Hodder & Stoughton, 1914.
- The Call of the Heart, A tale of eighty years since. London, Hodder & Stoughton, 1914.
- In Exchange for Love. London, Hodder & Stoughton, 1914.
- The One Girl in the World. London, Hodder & Stoughton, 1915; in 2 vols. as The One Girl in the World; or, A Love Triumphant, New York, Street & Smith (New Eagle ser. 978), n.d., and His Priceless Jewel, New York, Street & Smith (New Eagle ser. 979), n.d.
- Love, the Adventurous. London, Hodder & Stoughton, 1917.
- The Waster. London, Lloyds, 1918.
- The Girl in Love. London, Skeffington, 1919.

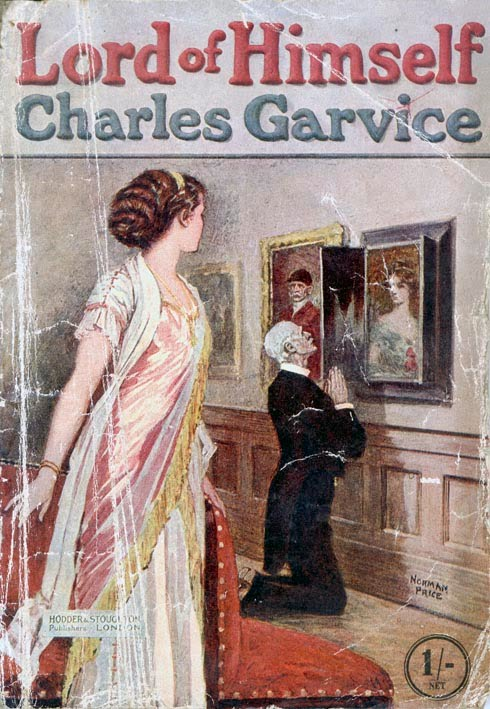
Lord of Himself (1911)

=== As Caroline Hart ===
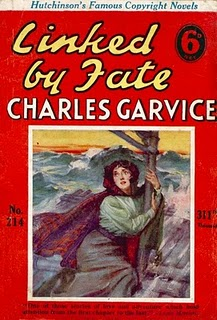
Linked by Fate (1903)

- Lil, The Dancing Girl. Cleveland, Arthur Westbrook (Hart ser. 3), 1909.
- Women Who Came Between. Cleveland, Arthur Westbrook (Hart ser. 5), 1909.
- Nameless Bess; or, The Triumph of Innocence. Cleveland, Arthur Westbrook (Hart ser. 12), 1909.
- That Awful Scar; or, Uncle Ebe’s Will. Cleveland, Arthur Westbrook (Hart ser.), 1909.
- Vengeance of Love. Cleveland, Arthur Westbrook, 1909?
- Redeemed by Love. Cleveland, Arthur Westbrook (Hart ser. 26), 1910
- A Hidden Terror; or. The Freemason’s Daughter. Cleveland, Arthur Westbrook (Hart ser. 36), 1910.
- Madness of Love. Cleveland, Arthur Westbrook (Hart ser. 48), 1910?
- A Working-Girl's Honor; or. Elsie Brandon’s Aristocratic Lover. Cleveland, Arthur Westbrook (Hart ser. 50), 1911.
- A Woman Wronged; or, The Secret of a Crime. Cleveland, Arthur Westbrook (Hart ser. 69), 1911.
- Angela's Lover. Cleveland, Arthur Westbrook, 1911.
- From Worse Than Death. Cleveland, Arthur Westbrook (Hart ser. 105), 1912?
- A Strange Marriage. Cleveland, Arthur Westbrook (Hart ser. 110), 1912.
- For Love or Honor. Cleveland, Arthur Westbrook, n.d.
- From Want to Wealth. Cleveland, Arthur Westbrook, n.d.
- Game of Love. Cleveland, Arthur Westbrook, n.d.
- Haunted Life. Cleveland, Arthur Westbrook, n.d.
- Hearts of Fire. Cleveland, Arthur Westbrook, n.d.
- Lillian's Vow. Cleveland, Arthur Westbrook, n.d.
- Little Princess. Cleveland, Arthur Westbrook, n.d.
- Love's Rugged Path. Cleveland, Arthur Westbrook, n.d.
- Nobody's Wife. Cleveland, Arthur Westbrook, n.d.
- Rival Heiresses. Cleveland, Arthur Westbrook, n.d.
- She Loved Not Wisely. Cleveland, Arthur Westbrook, n.d.
- The Woman Who Came Between. Cleveland, Economy Books League, 1933.

=== Collections ===
- My Lady of Snow and other stories. New York. G. Munro's Sons (Laurel Library 59), 1900?
- The Girl Without a Heart and other stories. London, Newnes, 1912.
- A Relenting Fate and other stories. London, Newnes, 1912.
- All Is Not Fair in Love and other stories. London, Newnes, 1913.
- The Tessacott Tragedy and other stories. London, Newnes, 1913.
- The Millionaire’s Daughter and other stories. New York, Street & Smith (New Eagle ser. 982), 1915.
- The Girl at the 'bacca Shop. London, Skeffington, 1920.
- Miss Smith's Fortune and other stories. London, Skeffington, 1920.

=== Other ===
Omnibus

- Four Complete Novels (contains: Just a Girl, On Love’s Altar, A Jest of Fate, Adrien Leroy). London, 1931.

Verse

- Eve and other verses. Privately printed, 1873.

Non-fiction

- A Farm in Creamland. A book of the Devon countryside. London, Hodder & Stoughton, 1911; New York, Doran, 1912.

Others

- The Red Budget of Stories, edited by Garvice. London, Hodder & Stoughton, 1912.

Plays

- The Fisherman's Daughter (produced London, 1881).
- Marigold, with Allan F. Abbott (produced Glasgow, 1914).
