= John Joy Bell =

Scottish journalist and author

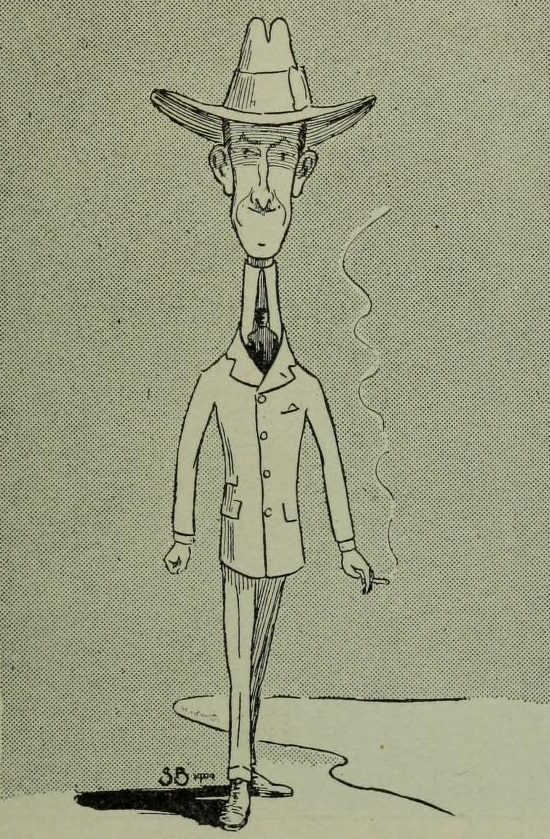
Caricature of Bell, by Stuart Boyd.

John Joy Bell (7 June 1871 – 14 November 1934), known professionally as J.J. Bell, was a Scottish journalist and author.

== Life ==
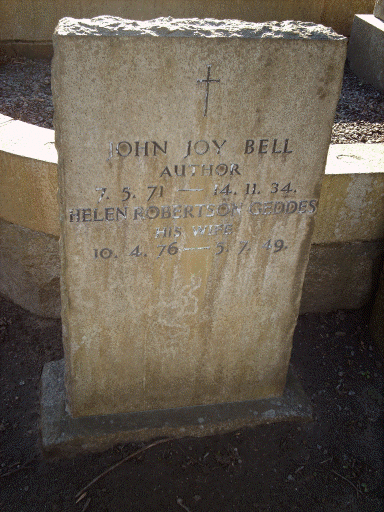
J.J. Bell's gravestone, St. Machar's Cathedral, Aberdeen

Born at 4 Bothwell Terrace in Hillhead, Glasgow he was the eldest son of James Taylor Bell, a tobacco manufacturer.

Bell was schooled at Kelvinside Academy and Morrison's Academy in Crieff. He attended the University of Glasgow, where he studied chemistry. After becoming a journalist, Bell worked for the Glasgow Evening Times, and as sub-editor of the Scots Pictorial. His articles described the life of working-class Glaswegians, and were often written in the vernacular. He created the character of 'Wee Macgreegor' for his Evening Times articles, and the stories were so popular that they were published in book form, and later made into a film.

Bell has often been criticised for being overly sentimental, but it is also said that his vernacular was accurately representative, which is partly what made them popular. During recent years though, Bell's books are increasingly neglected.

He is buried in the churchyard of St Machar's Cathedral in Aberdeen. The grave lies close to the north-east corner of the church.

== Family ==
He was married to Helen Robertson Geddes (1876-1949).

== Publications ==
- The New Noah's Ark (1898).
- Jack of All Trades (1899).
- Songs of the Hour (1900).
- Wee Macgreegor (1902).
- Ethel (1903).
- Mistress McLeerie (1903).
- Wee Macgreegor Again (1904).
- Later Adventures of Wee Macgreegor (1904).
- Jess & Co. (1904).
- Mr. Pennycook's Boy (1905).
- Mr. Lion of London (1905).
- Clyde Songs and other verses (1906).
- Thou Fool! (1907).
- Joseph Redhorn (1908).
- Whither Thou Goest (1908).
- Oh! Christina! (1909).
- Dancing Days (1910).
- Wullie McWattie's Master (1910).
- The Indiscretions of Maister Redhorn (1911).
- Jim (1911).
- A Kingdom of Dreams (1911).
- The Best Man (1911).
- Courtin' Christina (1913).
- Bobby (1914).
- The Whalers (1914).
- The Misadventures of Joseph (1914).
- Wee Macgreegor Enlists (1915).
- Little Grey Ships (1916).
- Cupid in Oilskins (1916).
- Kiddies (1916).
- Till The Clock Stops (1916).
- Story of Kitty Carstairs (1917).
- Secret Cards (1917).
- All Ages (1918).
- Johnny Pride (1918).
- Atlantic Gold (1918).
- Just Jemima (1919).
- The Middle Strip (1919).
- Jimmy Johnny (1920).
- The Pie in the Oven (in 1 act) (1922).
- Wee Macgreegor's Party (in 1 act) (1922).
- Thread o' Scarlet (in 1 act) (1923).
- Those Class Distinctions (in 1 act) (1923).
- Wolves (in 1 act) (1923).
- Some Plain, Some Coloured (1923).
- The Nickums (1923).
- Mr. Craw (1924).
- Courtin' Christina (in 1 act) (1924).
- The Laird's Lucky Number (in 1 act) (1924).
- The Invisible Net (1924).
- The Braw Bailie (1925).
- Mr. and Mrs. Craw (1926).
- Exit Mrs. McLeerie (in 1 act) (1927).
- Betty (1927).
- Hoots! (1929).
- The Whale-Hunters (1929).
- Meet Mr. Craw (1929).
- Gambler's Hope (1929).
- Breaking Point (in 1 act) (1930).
- Good-morning Sir John (in 1 act) (1930).
- Laird of Glenlaggan (1931).
- The Glory of Scotland (1932).
- The Women (1932).
- I Remember (1932).
- Scotland's Rainbow West (1933).
- Hamish (1934).
- Scotland in Ten Days (1934).
- Melodies and Memories (1934).
- Do you remember?
- On the Quay (poem)
- Beyond London Lights

== Sources ==
- reference.allrefer.com
- users.globalnet.co.uk
- theglasgowstory.com
- abebooks.co.uk
- factmonster.com
- Bleiler, Everett (1948). The Checklist of Fantastic Literature. Chicago: Shasta Publishers. p. 46.
