= Peg Woffington (disambiguation) =

Peg Woffington (1720–1760) was an Irish actress and socialite of the Georgian era.

Peg Woffington may also refer to:

- Peg Woffington (1910 film), an American silent historical film
- Peg Woffington (1912 film), a British silent historical film
- Peg Woffington (novel), an 1853 novel by Charles Reade
