= 1854 in literature =

This article contains information about the literary events and publications of 1854.

== Events ==
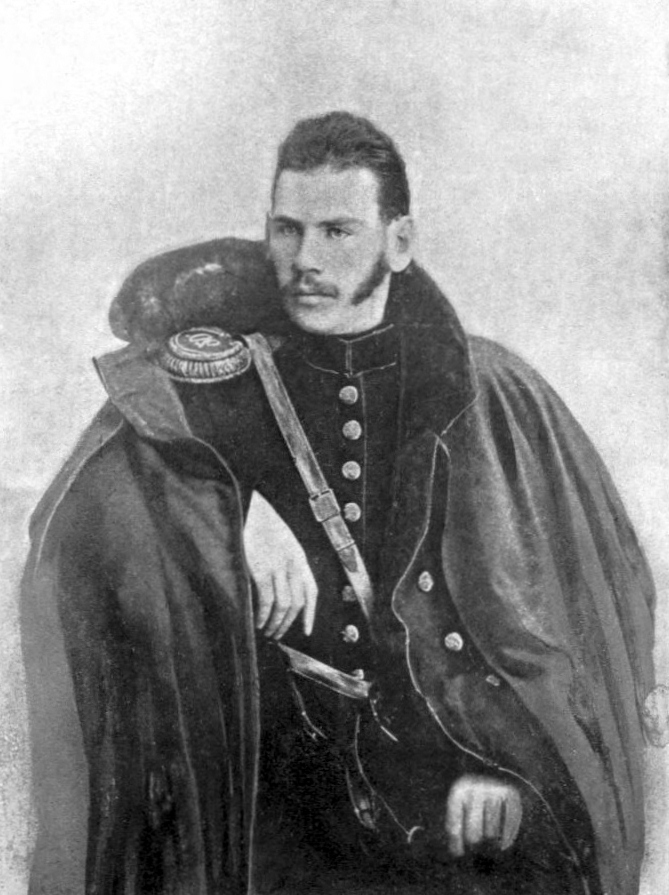
Tolstoy during the Crimean War, c. 1854

- March 2 – An adaptation of Shakespeare's The Merchant of Venice into Bengali, Bhānumatī-chittavilās by Hara Chandra Ghosh, is staged; also, Dinabandhu Mitra introduces John Falstaff in Nabin Tapaswini.
- March 20 – The Boston Public Library opens to the public in Boston, Massachusetts.
- April 1 – August 12 – Charles Dickens's novel Hard Times, is serialised in his magazine Household Words. From September 2, it is followed in the magazine by Elizabeth Gaskell's North and South, another social novel based in the Lancashire manufacturing district.
- July – Publication begins of Anthony Trollope's novel Barchester Towers (1857).
- November – Crimean War: Future novelist Leo Tolstoy arrives to take part as a defending soldier in the Siege of Sevastopol (1854–55). Off-duty he is reading William Makepeace Thackeray's novels in French translation.
- December 14 – Wilkie Collins's "The Lawyer's Story of a Stolen Letter", published as "The Fourth Poor Traveller" in The Seven Poor Travellers – the Household Words special Christmas number – is the first non-police detective fiction published in Britain.
- unknown dates
  - John Rollin Ridge's The Life and Adventures of Joaquín Murieta, The Celebrated California Bandit is the first novel by a Native American in the United States (writing as "Yellow Bird") to be published.
  - The Polyglotta Africana, an early classification of African languages based on field work under freed slaves in Freetown, Sierra Leone, is published by Sigismund Wilhelm Koelle.

== New books ==
=== Fiction ===
- William Harrison Ainsworth – The Flitch of Bacon
- Margaret Jewett Smith Bailey (anonymously) – The Grains, or, Passages in the Life of Ruth Rover, with Occasional Pictures of Oregon, Natural and Moral
- Jules Amédée Barbey d'Aurevilly – L'Ensorcelée
- William Wells Brown – Sketches of Places and People Abroad
- Camilla Collett (anonymously) – Amtmandens Døtre (The District Governor's Daughters, first part)
- Wilkie Collins – Hide and Seek
- John Esten Cooke – The Virginia Comedians
- Maria Cummins – The Lamplighter
- Charles Dickens – Hard Times
- Fanny Fern – Ruth Hall
- Mathilde Fibiger – Minona
- Frederick Greenwood – The Loves of an Apothecary
- Francesco Domenico Guerrazzi – Beatrice Cenci
- Nathaniel Hawthorne – Mosses from an Old Manse
- Caroline Lee Hentz – The Planter's Northern Bride
- Mary Jane Holmes – Tempest and Sunshine
- Mary Russell Mitford – Atherton
- Gérard de Nerval – Les Filles du feu (short stories)
- Charles Reade – The Courier of Lyons
- Solon Robinson – Hot Corn
- E. D. E. N. Southworth – The Lost Heiress
- Leo Tolstoy – Boyhood («Отрочество», Otrochestvo)

=== Children and young people ===
- Anna Eliza Bray – A Peep at the Pixies, or Legends of the West (illustrated by Phiz)

=== Drama ===
- Émile Augier and Jules Sandeau – Le Gendre de M. Poirier
- Andreas Munch – Salomon de Caus
- Alexander Ostrovsky – Poverty is No Vice («Бедность не порок», Bednost ne porok)
- Charles Reade
  - The Courier of Lyons
  - The King's Rival
- Zacharias Topelius – Regina von Emmeritz
- George Henry Miles – Mary's Birthday

=== Poetry ===
- R. D. Blackmore – Poems by Melanter
- Coventry Patmore – The Angel in the House
- Emma Tatham – The Dream of Pythagoras and Other Poems
- Alfred Tennyson – "The Charge of the Light Brigade"

=== Non-fiction ===
- Samuel Bache – Exposition of Unitarian Views of Christianity
- George Boole – The Laws of Thought
- William Erskine with Claudius James Erskine – History of India under the two first sovereigns of the house of Taimur, Baber, and Humayun
- F. W. Fairholt – Dictionary of Terms in Art
- Ludwig Feuerbach – The Essence of Christianity (Das Wesen des Christentums)
- Kuno Fischer – History of Modern Philosophy (Geschichte der neueren Philosophie), vol. 1
- Elisha Kane – The U. S. Grinnell Expedition in Search of Sir John Franklin: a Personal Narrative
- Éliphas Lévi – Dogme et rituel de la haute magie (Dogma and Ritual of High Magic), vol. 1, Dogme
- Theodor Mommsen – History of Rome (Römische Geschichte), vol. 1
- John Neal – One Word More: Intended for the Reasoning and Thoughtful among Unbelievers
- Henry David Thoreau – Walden, or Life in the Woods

== Births ==
- March 11 – Jane Meade Welch, American journalist and historian (died 1931)
- March 13 – Kolachalam Srinivasa Rao, Indian dramatist (died 1919)
- March 14 – Alexandru Macedonski, Romanian poet, novelist and dramatist (died 1920)
- May 24 – Mona Caird, English novelist, essayist and feminist (died 1932)
- May 25 – Clara Louise Burnham, née Root, American novelist (died 1927)
- June 10
  - François, Vicomte de Curel, French dramatist (died 1928)
  - Sarah Grand, Irish author and women's rights advocate (died 1943)
- July 7 – W. C. Morrow, American writer, noted for his stories of horror and suspense. (died 1923)
- August 2 – Francis Marion Crawford, American novelist (died 1909)
- September 1 – Florence Trail, American educator and author (died 1944)
- October 16 – Oscar Wilde, Irish dramatist, poet and wit (died 1900)
- October 20
  - Alphonse Allais, French humorist (died 1905)
  - Arthur Rimbaud, French poet (died 1891)
- unknown date – Eliza D. Keith, American educator, author and journalist (died 1939)

== Deaths ==
- January 5 – Gottschalk Eduard Guhrauer, German philologist and biographer (born 1809)
- February 4 – George Watterston, American librarian of Congress (born 1783)
- April 3 – John Wilson, Scottish poet and journalist (born 1785)
- April 7 – Pierre-François Tissot, French historian and memoirist (born 1768)
- April 16 – Julia Nyberg, Swedish poet (born 1784)
- April 24 – Gabriele Rossetti, Italian poet (born 1783)
- April 30 – James Montgomery, Scottish-born poet and hymnist (born 1771)
- July 20 – Caroline Anne Southey (Caroline Anne Bowles), English poet (born 1786)
- October 14 – Samuel Phillips, English journalist (born 1814)
- November 5 – Susan Edmonstone Ferrier, Scottish novelist (born 1782)
- November 25 – John Kitto, English Biblical commentator (born 1804)
- December 9 – Almeida Garrett, Portuguese poet, novelist and dramatist (born 1799)

== Awards ==
- Chancellor's Gold Medal – Herbert John Reynolds
- July – Opening of Anthony Trollope's novel Barchester Towers (1857).
