= Peg Woffington (1912 film) =

- Directed by: A. E. Coleby
- Written by: Tom Taylor (play); Charles Reade (play); George Pearson
- Starring: Leslie Howard Gordon
- Production company: Britannia Films
- Distributed by: Pathé Pictures International
- Release date: August 1912
- Country: United Kingdom
- Languages: Silent; English intertitles

Peg Woffington is a 1912 British silent historical film directed by A. E. Coleby and starring Leslie Howard Gordon. The film is based on the 1852 play Masks and Faces by Tom Taylor and Charles Reade. The play had previously been turned into a 1910 American film, and several further adaptations followed. It features the eighteenth century Irish actress Peg Woffington as a major character.

== Bibliography ==
- Klossner, Michael. The Europe of 1500-1815 on Film and Television: A Worldwide Filmography of Over 2550 Works, 1895 Through 2000. McFarland & Company, 2002.
