= Courrier de Lyon case =

1796 French legal case

The "Courrier de Lyon" case is a famous French criminal case. It occurred during the French Revolution. During the night of 27 and 28 April 1796, a mail coach was ambushed outside Paris (commune of Vert-Saint-Denis) by several men who stole a large sum of money (7 million livres). The stage coach was supposed to go to Lyon from Paris, carrying money for the Army of Italy. Both the driver and the armed guard were brutally killed. A third man on board, travelling under an assumed name, participated in the killing and later vanished.

Following investigations, six men (Etienne Couriol, Charles Guénot, Joseph Richard, Antoine Bruer, David Bernard and Joseph Lesurques) were arrested. After a trial, Couriol, Bernard and Lesurques were executed. Before his execution, however, Couriol claimed that Lesurques was innocent and was only arrested because he resembled André Dubosq, one of the actual attackers of the coach. Couriol's last denunciations also helped arrest other accomplices: Joseph Durochat, who travelled aboard the coach as "Laborde"; Pierre Vidal, who came up with the plan to rob the coach; and Louis Roussy, one of the killers. All of them were convicted and executed. Dubosq was also arrested and executed; however, his trial was not enough to overturn the judgement sentencing Lesurques, for all the witnesses who had recognised Lesurques persisted in saying that they had indeed seen Lesurques and not Dubosq.

Lesurques' family spent most of the 19th century trying to rehabilitate him; but none of the various committees assembled to re-examine the case found sufficient grounds to clear Lesurques' name. Nevertheless, Lesurques is widely believed to be innocent and this case is remembered in France for being a famous example of miscarriage of justice.

== In popular culture ==
The story was turned into two notable plays, a French version by Paul Siraudin and Louis-Mathurin Moreau and the 1854 play The Courier of Lyons by Charles Reade. In 1877 he rewrote the play as The Lyons Mail for performance by Henry Irving at the Lyceum Theatre in London.

Numerous film adaptations of these two works have been made. In a 1937 French film L'Affaire du courrier de Lyon the case is featured.

Reade's play was turned into a 1916 silent film The Lyons Mail and a sound version The Lyons Mail in 1931.

In an episode in the popular 1960's French comic "Le Tour de Gaule d'Asterix", set in 50 B.C. France, Asterix and Obelix steal a postal service chariot to continue on their journey to Lugdunum, which was the Roman name for Lyon. The Roman driver, tied up in the back, swears his revenge in a thought-bubble, declaring, "I promise you haven't heard the last of the affair of the courrier of Lugdunum!"
