= Peg of Old Drury =

- Anna Neagle and Jack Hawkins
- Directed by: Herbert Wilcox
- Screenplay by: Miles Malleson
- Based on: Masks and Faces by Charles Reade and Tom Taylor
- Produced by: Herbert Wilcox
- Starring: Anna Neagle; Cedric Hardwicke; Margaretta Scott
- Cinematography: Freddie Young
- Edited by: Merrill G. White
- Production company: Herbert Wilcox Productions for British & Dominions Film Corporation
- Distributed by: United Artists Corporation
- Release date: 28 August 1935 (London)
- Running time: 75 minutes
- Country: United Kingdom
- Language: English

Peg of Old Drury is a 1935 British historical film directed by Herbert Wilcox and starring Anna Neagle, Cedric Hardwicke and Margaretta Scott. It was written by Miles Malleson based on the play Masks and Faces by Charles Reade and Tom Taylor. The film is a biopic of 18th century Irish actress Peg Woffington and contains passages of 18th century Shakespearian performance, from The Merchant of Venice, Richard III and As You Like It.

== Plot ==
The film is a very affectionate look at the life of Peg Woffington, and her relationship with David Garrick. It is a lavish costume drama and recreates a Hogarth-type atmosphere of contemporary London in the mid 18th century. It is laced with snippets of legendary history such as Lord Sandwich's invention of the sandwich. Peg is generally more popular with the men than with the women, particularly her fellow female actors. The film has it that Peg dies off stage at the end of the film.

== Cast ==
- Anna Neagle as Peg Woffington
- Cedric Hardwicke as David Garrick
- Margaretta Scott as Kitty Clive
- Maire O'Neill as Mrs. Woffington – Peg's mother
- Arthur Sinclair as Mr. Woffington – Peg's father
- Dorothy Robinson as Mrs. Margaret Dalloway
- Polly Emery as Martha the maid
- Aubrey Fitzgerald as Digby
- Jack Hawkins as Michael O'Taffe
- Robert Atkins as Dr. Samuel Johnson
- Hay Petrie as John Rich
- George Barrett as Tom – stage doorkeeper
- Stuart Robertson as singer
- Leslie French as Alexander Pope
- Tom Heslewood as William Pitt, 1st Earl of Chatham
- Christopher Steele as Oliver Goldsmith
- Eliot Makeham as Dr. Bowdler
- Sara Allgood as Irish woman on boat

== Critical reception ==
The film was voted the third best British movie of 1936. Wilcox said the film "was enormously successful both here and in the States, artistically as well as at the box office."

The Monthly Film Bulletin wrote: "A somewhat trite and naturally rather patchy account ... The film as a whole suffers chiefly from the fact that it never seems really to get anywhere, or to say anything of vital importance."

The New York Times wrote, "with superb acting, photography that is effective and unusual, yet not bizarre, and direction that is gentleness and good taste itself, Peg of Old Drury is one of the finest cinema production ever to come out of England, or of anywhere else, for that matter."

TV Guide wrote, "Neagle and Hardwicke give impressive performances, and the excerpts from Shakespeare and Jonson are flawlessly mounted. Much of the film's power derives from the screenplay by actor Malleson in his first screenwriting assignment."

Graham Greene, writing for The Spectator, gave a mixed review suggesting that there is "no historical truth to be found anywhere in the deft, neat tale". Greene remarked on the attractiveness of Neagle and found that the film was "very pretty", but concluded that "prettiness is a quality one wants, if at all, in small quantities".
