= Masks and Faces =

1917 film

- Directed by: Fred Paul
- Written by: Charles Reade (novel); Tom Taylor (play); Benedict James
- Produced by: Fred Paul; Maurice Elvey
- Starring: Johnston Forbes-Robertson; Irene Vanbrugh; Gerald du Maurier; Gladys Cooper
- Production company: Ideal Film Company
- Distributed by: Ideal Film Company
- Release date: March 1917
- Running time: 6,700 feet
- Country: United Kingdom
- Language: English

Masks and Faces is a 1917 British silent biographical film directed by Fred Paul and starring Johnston Forbes-Robertson, Irene Vanbrugh and Henry S. Irving. The film depicts episodes from the life of the eighteenth-century Irish actress Peg Woffington. It is based on the 1852 play Masks and Faces by Charles Reade and Tom Taylor.

== Cast ==
- Johnston Forbes-Robertson - Triplet
- Irene Vanbrugh - Peg Woffington
- Henry S. Irving - Colander
- Gerald du Maurier - Hunsdon
- Dennis Neilson-Terry - Ernest Vane
- Gladys Cooper - Mabel Vane
- Ben Webster - Sir Charles Pomander
- C.M. Lowne - Quinn
- Nigel Playfair - Rich
- Lillah McCarthy - Kitty Clive
- Dion Boucicault Jr. - Colly Cibber
- Henry Vibart - Burdock
- Donald Calthrop - Lovell
- J. Fisher White - Snarl
- Lyall Swete - Soper
- Helen Haye - Dame Best
- Matheson Lang - Coachman
- Weedon Grossmith - Fiddler
- Gerald Ames - Fencing Master
- Mary Brough - Landlady
- Gertrude Elliott - Member of Rich's Company
- Lilian Braithwaite - Member of Rich's Company
- Ellaline Terriss - Member of Rich's Company
- Fabia Drake - Triplet's Child
- Renée Mayer - Triplet's Child
- Mabel Russell - Footman
