= Argosy (UK magazine) =

1865–2014 magazine title of three separate publications

Argosy magazine (also known as The Argosy) was the title of three magazines published in the United Kingdom, one in the late 19th century, another in the middle of the 20th century, and the other, very briefly, in the early 21st century.

== 1865 ==
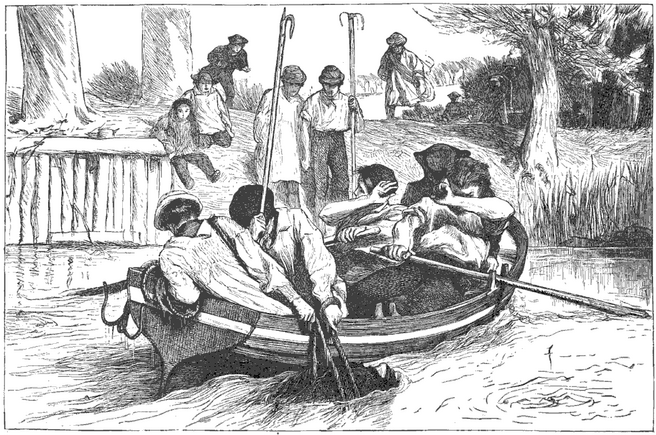
Illustration by William Small from Griffith Gaunt serialization.

The original Argosy was founded and edited by Alexander Strahan in 1865, and later owned and edited by Ellen Wood. A somewhat racy tone was set from the outset by serializing Charles Reade's novel Griffith Gaunt, which concerns a case of bigamy. Among the many well-known contributors were Hesba Stretton, Julia Kavanagh, Christina Rossetti, Sarah Doudney, Rosa Nouchette Carey, Anthony Trollope, Henrietta Keddie (as Sarah Tytler), Helen Zimmern, and the traveller and linguist Arminius Vambery. Wood continued as its editor until her death in 1887, when her son Charles Wood took over. It ran until 1901.

== 1926 ==
A later British Argosy was a short story magazine in paperback size focusing on reprints, and was published from 1926 to 1974. It published stories and serials by leading authors, sometimes interspersed with one or two pages of quotations, excerpts and poetry. Cartoons were also a regular feature. Joan Aiken worked as Features Editor on the magazine from 1955 to 1960. Lord Dunsany, Ray Bradbury, H. E. Bates, Victor Canning, Michael Gilbert, C. S. Forester, Elizabeth Goudge, Pamela Hansford Johnson and Gerald Bullett were among the writers whose material appeared in Argosy.

== 2013 ==
A third United Kingdom-based magazine of short stories entitled Argosy published only two issues, one dated December 2013 and the other February 2014.
