= Christie Johnstone =

Christie Johnstone may refer to:

- Christie Johnstone (novel), an 1853 novel by Charles Reade
- Christie Johnstone (film), a 1921 silent film adaptation directed by Norman McDonald
