= A Terrible Temptation =

1871 novel by Charles Reade

A Terrible Temptation: A Story of the Day
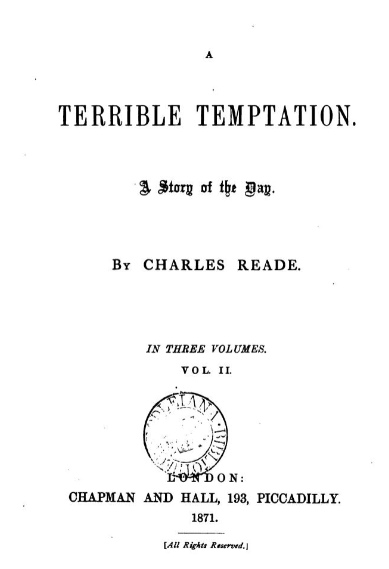
- Author: Charles Reade
- Language: English
- Genre: Novel
- Publisher: London: Chapman and Hall
- Publication date: August 1871
- Media type: Print (Hardcover)
- Pages: English 1871 ed. 3 volumes: 303, 310, 300

A Terrible Temptation: A Story of the Day is an 1871 sensation novel by Charles Reade. It first appeared serially in Cassell's Magazine in England from March 4 to August 26, 1871.

Similar to 1866's Griffith Gaunt, the novel received negative reviews in the English press due to its content, which included extramarital relations and a courtesan, but this also helped increase sales of Reade's works in America. The Times told parents to keep the book away from their daughters. Reade responded by noting that stories in their paper inspired many of his works, and it was hypocritical to complain about the same type of content they use to sell papers. In subsequent correspondence, Reade noted that he had already sold over 370,000 copies of the novel in the United States, much larger than the Times circulation.

A 2013 review calls the book "a sensation novel which makes Lady Audley's Secret look uneventful and The Woman in White slow-moving."
