= Peg Woffington (1910 film) =

- Directed by: Edwin S. Porter
- Written by: Tom Taylor (play); Charles Reade (play); Edwin S. Porter
- Starring: Florence Turner
- Production company: Edison Manufacturing Company
- Distributed by: General Film Company
- Release date: July 26, 1910
- Country: United States
- Languages: Silent; English intertitles

Peg Woffington is a 1910 American silent historical film directed by Edwin S. Porter and starring Florence Turner as the eighteenth century Irish actress Peg Woffington. The film is based on the 1852 play Masks and Faces by Tom Taylor and Charles Reade.

== Bibliography ==
- Klossner, Michael. The Europe of 1500-1815 on Film and Television: A Worldwide Filmography of Over 2550 Works, 1895 Through 2000. McFarland & Company, 2002.
