= The Lyons Mail =

1931 film

- Trade Show advertisement
- Directed by: Arthur Maude
- Written by: H. Fowler Mear
- Based on: The Lyons Mail by Charles Reade
- Produced by: Julius Hagen
- Starring: John Martin Harvey; Norah Baring; Ben Webster; Moore Marriott
- Cinematography: Sydney Blythe
- Production company: Twickenham Studios
- Distributed by: Woolf & Freedman Film Service
- Release date: 12 October 1931
- Running time: 76 minutes
- Country: United Kingdom
- Language: English

The Lyons Mail (also known as Coufrier de Lyon) is a 1931 British historical mystery adventure film directed by Arthur Maude and starring John Martin-Harvey, Norah Baring, and Ben Webster. It was written by H. Fowler Mear based on the 1877 play The Lyons Mail by Charles Reade, which in turn was based on his 1854 play The Courier of Lyons.

The play had previously been made into a 1916 silent film The Lyons Mail.Filmed in 1930 at the Twickenham Studios in London, it was to be John Martin-Harvey's only sound film.

The story is based on the Courrier de Lyon case.

== Cast ==
- John Martin-Harvey as Joseph Lesurques
- Norah Baring as Julie
- Ben Webster as Jerome Lesurques
- Moore Marriott as Choppard
- George Thirlwell as Jean Didier
- Michael Hogan as Courrioll
- Sheila Wray as Madame Choppard
- Eric Howard as Fouinard
- Charles Paton as George Didier
- Earl Grey as Daubenton
- John Garside as Adjutant
- Gabrielle Casartelli as maid

== Reception ==
Film Weekly wrote: "This mellow favourite of touring companies and amateur theatrical productions loses none of its fruitiness in its guise of talkie. It belongs to a period of dramatic entertainment with which we have so lost sympathy that we find its melodramatic product amusing and its comedies dull. As it is played here – quite straight and without concessions to present-day tastes – The Lyons Mail is more amusing than it is moving, although the actual robbery is grippingly presented."

Picture Show wrote: "Hearty melodrama, well recorded."
