= Peg Woffington =

Irish actress and socialite (1720–1760)

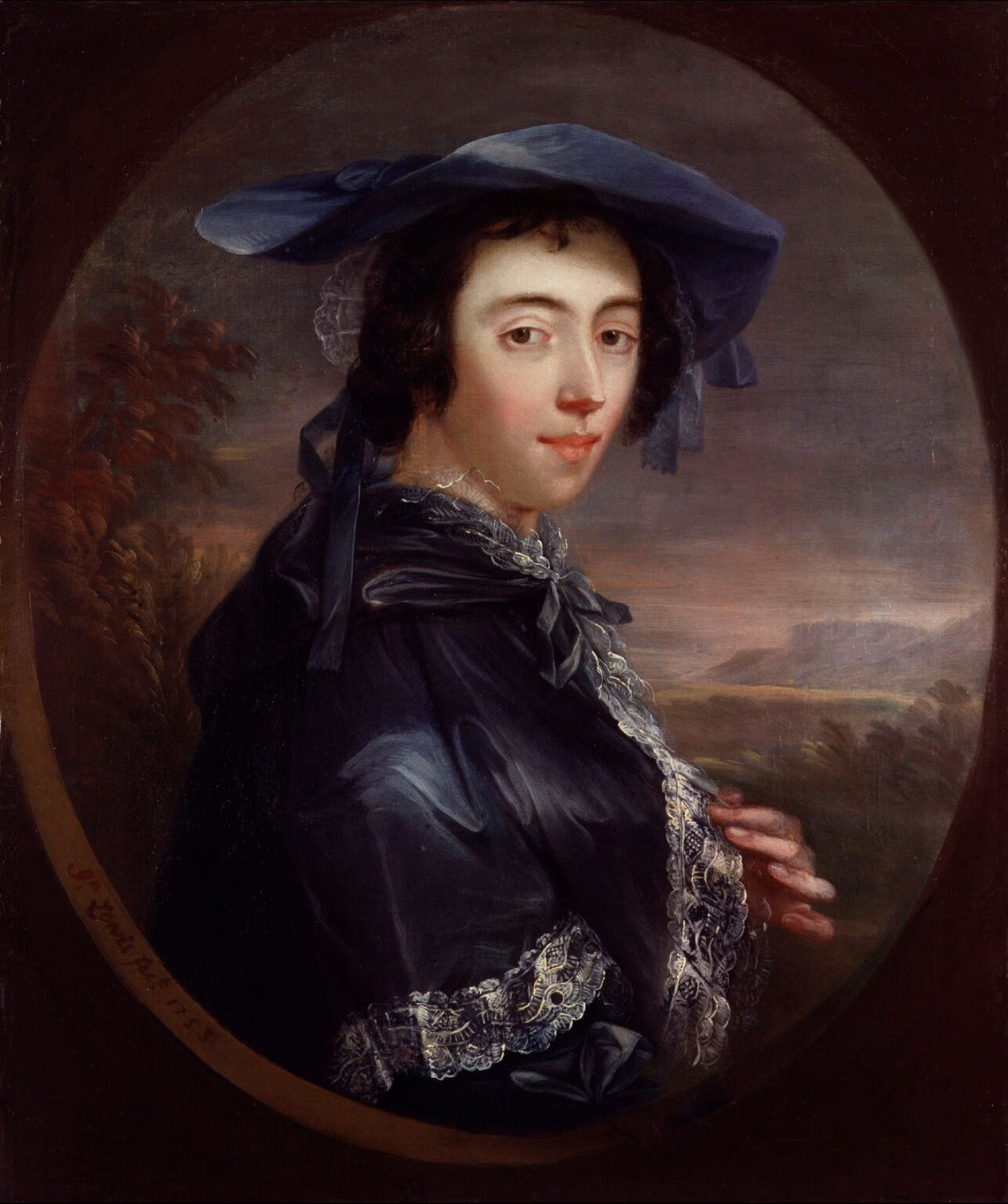
- Margaret Woffington, by John Lewis, 1753
- Born: 18 October 1720; Dublin
- Died: 28 March 1760
- Occupation: Actor
- Relatives: Mary Woffington

Margaret Woffington (18 October 1720 – 28 March 1760), was an Irish actress and socialite of the Georgian era.

== Early life ==
Woffington was born of humble origins in Dublin, Ireland yet excelled in playing women from the upper classes. Her father is thought to have been a bricklayer, and after his death, the family became impoverished. Her mother was obliged to take in washing while Peg sold watercress door to door. Madame Violante, a famous tightrope walker, took her on as her apprentice. Her sister Mary Woffington was also an actress but she did not enjoy the same success.

== Acting career ==
Around 1730, Madame Violante featured the young Woffington in her Lilliputian Theatre Company's production of John Gay’s The Beggar's Opera. Her performance as Mackheath served as a springboard for continued fame in Dublin. She continued dancing and acting in the area – playing Dorinda in an adaptation of The Tempest as the Theatre Royal, Dublin in 1735 and later joining the Smock Alley Theatre to perform with the well known actor, David Garrick. She danced and acted at various Dublin theatres until her early twenties, when her reputation drew a handsome offer from John Rich, the manager of the Covent Garden Theatre, to perform on the stages of London. There, she found immediate success, in the role of Sylvia in The Recruiting Officer by George Farquhar.

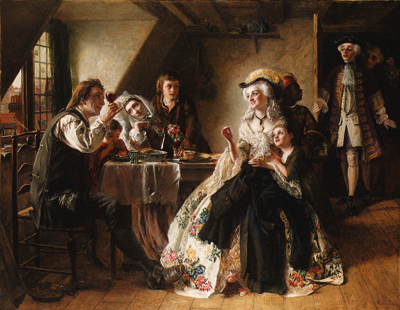
A painting of Peg Woffington visiting a fictional poet called Triplet, painted by Rebecca Solomon, 100 years after the death of Woffington.

She drew public attention when she was cast as Sir Harry Wildair in The Constant Couple. Audiences were intrigued, as at the time the role was highly associated with actor Robert Wilks, who had died seven years earlier. Nonetheless, her performance was well received, and audiences enjoyed her new interpretation of the role. She became well known as an actress thereafter. She performed at Drury Lane for several years and later returned to Dublin, appearing in a variety of plays. Her best-received performances were in comic roles, such as elegant women of fashion like Lady Betty Modish and Lady Townley, and breeches roles. She was impeded in the performance of tragedy by a harsh tone in her voice that she strove to eliminate.

While in London, she began living with fellow actor Charles Macklin. During this time, she became well acquainted with the foremost actor of the day David Garrick, and her other love affairs (including liaisons with Edward Bligh, 2nd Earl of Darnley and the MP Charles Hanbury Williams) were numerous and notorious. However, her affairs were not without controversy. One evening, Woffington and Garrick were almost caught in bed together by a visiting Noble Lord, who was believed to be enamoured with the actress. Upon fleeing, Garrick gathered his clothes, but noticed only once he had left the room that he had left behind his scratch wig. Woffington managed to evade the angry Lord's accusations by claiming the wig was her own, for an upcoming breeches role.

Though she was popular with society figures, having entertained such illustrious names as Samuel Johnson and Henry Fielding, Peg Woffington was not always favoured by her competition. She tended to create rivalries with similar-types of actresses at Drury Lane and Covent Garden. She even managed to offend "tragediennes for whom Peg’s comic powers posed no threat" with her "queenly ways". Her fiercest rivalry was with "equally peppery" actress Kitty Clive. According to Garrick's biographer Thomas Davies, "No two women in high life ever hated each other more unreservedly than these two great dames of the stage." When she returned to Covent Garden, rivalries with these women and with the manager, Mr. Rich, eventually sent her back to Dublin, where she was unrivalled and celebrated at the Smock Alley Theatre.

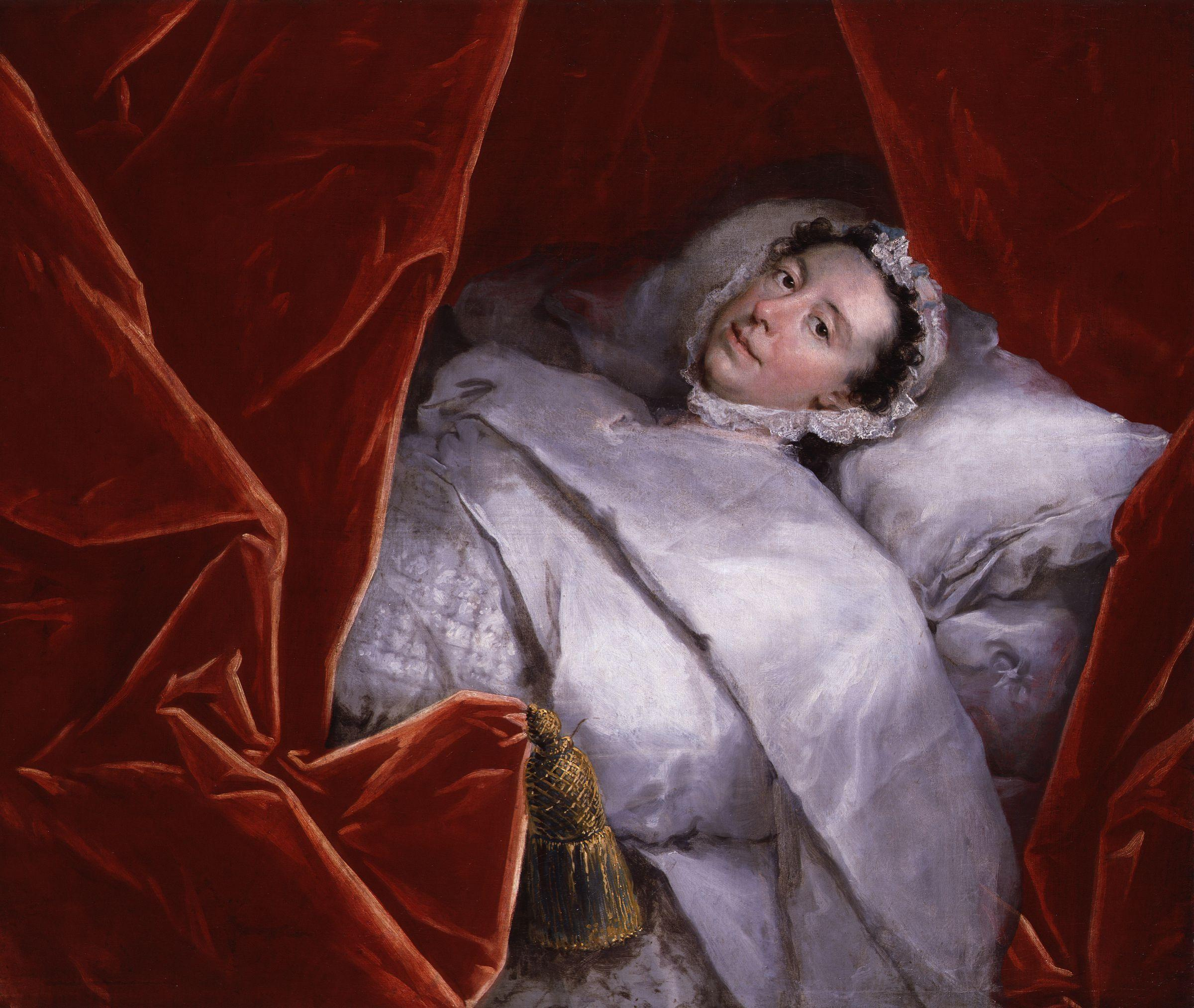
Margaret Woffington in bed after her paralysis, circa 1758.

John Rich, manager of Covent Garden in London, decided to start a Beefsteak Club in 1749, also known as the Sublime Society of Steaks or "the Club." Some of its members included Garrick and William Hogarth, as well as many other London celebrities. Not only was Peg Woffington the first female member of a (previously) all male dining club, in 1750 she became president of the club by election. She also educated and supported her sister Mary (usually known as Polly), and cared for and pensioned her mother.

Woffington parted from Garrick around 1744, and thence moved to the Thameside Middlesex village of Teddington, into a house called 'Teddington Place' (the building was demolished in 1946, its former grounds now being occupied by Udney Hall Gardens park and St Alban's Church, Teddington). In 1754 she became the beneficiary of the will of the Irish impresario Owen Swiny. In 1756, she performed the part of Lady Randolph in Douglas, a part which found a later exponent in Sarah Siddons.

On 3 May 1757, she was playing the part of Rosalind in As You Like It when she collapsed on stage. She rallied, but would never act again, lingering with a wasting illness until 1760.

== Death ==
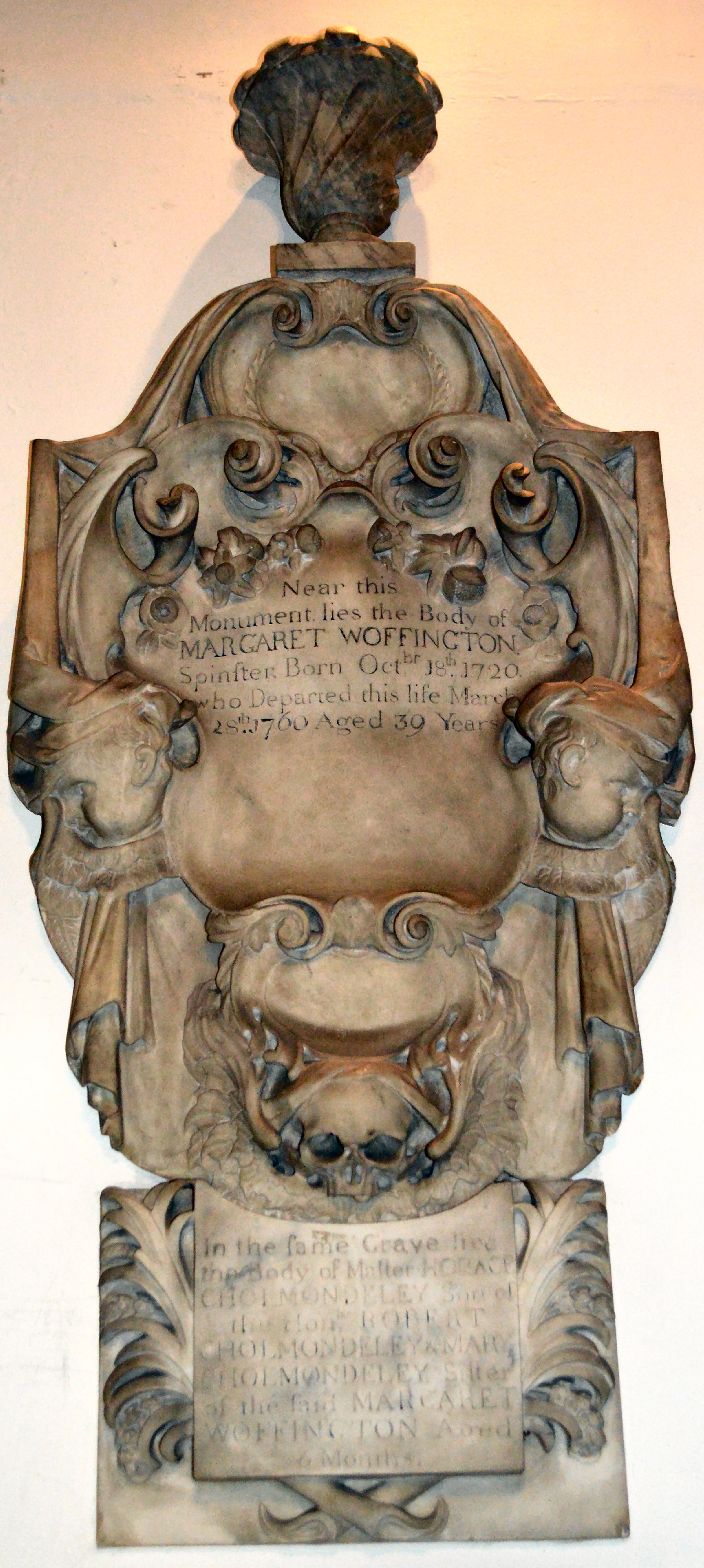
Monument in St Mary's church, Teddington

She built and endowed by will some almshouses at Teddington, and after her death on 28 March 1760 in her 40th year her body was buried in the graveyard of St. Mary's Church there. Though she was born into a Catholic family, she was buried a Protestant, having been received into the Church of Ireland on 31 December 1753. Woffington died a woman of wealth and had left most of her fortune to her sister, Mary.

== Portraits ==
Considered a society beauty of her era, Woffington was painted by several artists, including Jacobus Lovelace in 1744, Peter van Bleeck in 1747, and John Lewis in 1753. She was also eulogised in a poetical sketch by the dramatist Henry Jones.

She has been portrayed as a character in the stage plays A Laughing Matter by April De Angelis. and Mr Foote's Other Leg by Ian Kelly.

== Popular culture ==
In 1852 Charles Reade and Tom Taylor wrote a play Masks and Faces which featured Woffington as a central character. Following the play's success, Reade wrote a novel Peg Woffington in 1855. A play by Frances Aymar Mathews, Pretty Peggy (1902), starred Grace George as Woffington.

Woffington featured in several films, particularly in the silent era. These portrayals were largely based on the works of Reade and Taylor and include Peg Woffington (1910), Peg Woffington (1912) and Masks and Faces (1917). In 1935 Anna Neagle played Woffington in the comedy Peg of Old Drury with Cedric Hardwicke playing David Garrick. Her character appeared in the 2015 play Mr Foote's Other Leg as a friend and colleague of Samuel Foote.

Woffington is also mentioned in the Cyclops episode of James Joyce's Ulysses.

Woffington appears as the main character in the graphic novel La pièce manquante ("The Missing Play", 2023) by Jean Harambat. Wanting to go down into history with a great role, she becomes interested in William Shakespeare's missing play The History of Cardenio when her manager and close friend Ignatius Sancho tells her about it. She and Sancho then go on a quest to find it, but they also discover interests that try to keep them away from the play – including David Garrick, who is both Woffington's competitor and unwelcomed suitor.

== Bibliography ==
- Austin Dobson's Introduction to Charles Reade's novel Peg Woffington (London, 1899)
- Augustin Daly's Woffington: a Tribute to the Actress and the Woman (1888)
- Janet Camden Lucey's Lovely Peggy: The life and times of Margaret Woffington (Hurst and Blackett, 1952)
- Janet Dunbar's Peg Woffington and her World (Heinemann, 1968)
- Benjamin, Lewis Saul. Stage Favourites of the Eighteenth Century. Garden City, N.Y: Doubleday Doran & Company, Inc, 1929. Print.
- Costigan, Ethna Byrne-. "Peg Woffington." Dublin Historical Record 33.1 (1979): 11–21. Print.
- Perry, Gillian. The First Actresses: Nell Gwyn to Sarah Siddons. Ann Arbor: University of Michigan Press, 2011. Print.
- Powell, John, and Frank N. Magill. Great Lives from History: The 18th Century 1701–1800. Pasadena, Calif.: Salem Press, 2006. Print. Accessed online 27 February 2014.
- Richards, Sandra. The Rise of the English Actress. New York: St. Martin's Press, 1993. Print.
- Melville, Lewis. Stage Favourites of the Eighteenth Century. New York: Doubleday, 1929. Print.
