= Frances Aymar Mathews =

American playwright and novelist (1865–1925)

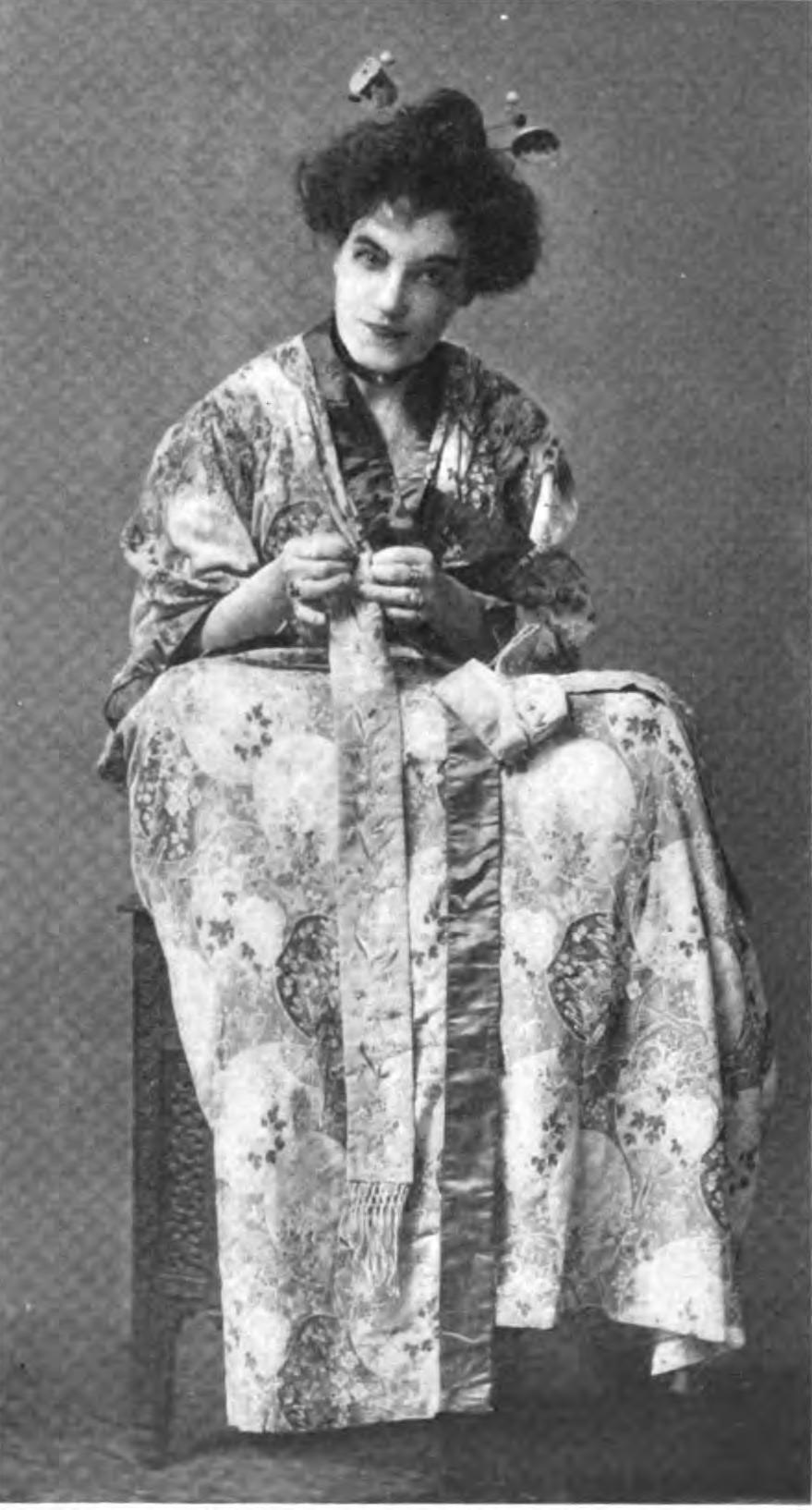
- Born: 1865; New York City
- Died: September 10, 1925
- Occupations: Writer, playwright

Frances Aymar Mathews (1865 – September 10, 1925) was an American playwright and novelist. Her most successful play was Pretty Peggy (1902), starring Grace George.

Frances Aymar Mathews was born in 1865 in New York City, the daughter of Daniel A. Mathews, an auctioneer, and Sara Eayres Webb Mathews. The granddaughter of Aaron Burr's biographer Matthew Livingston Davis. She was educated at home by private tutors. During her adult years Frances resided in Indianapolis. Mathews began her career writing articles and stories for magazines like Frank Leslie’s Popular Monthly, Godey’s Lady's Book, and Harper’s Bazaar.

Her first play was Bigamy (1881), a five-act society drama. In 1887, she sued producers Daniel Frohman, David Belasco, and Henry C. De Mille, alleging that scenes in their hit The Wife (1887) were taken from a play she submitted to Frohman. The suit was rejected by the New York Supreme Court in 1891. In 1889, Mathews was the first woman in America to publish a collection of one-act comedies, To-night at Eight.

Actress Fanny Davenport engaged Mathews to write a play about Joan of Arc with Davenport in the starring role. Mathews wrote a blank verse drama called A Soldier of France that was based in historical research, but also took significant liberties, such as a love interest for Joan of Arc. The play premiered in Boston in 1897 and, despite the lavish and expensive effects, it was a critical failure.

Mathew's biggest success was Pretty Peggy (1902). The play was about the early career of 18th century actress Peg Woffington, played by Grace George, and her romance with actor David Garrick. A highlight of the play was costumed actors appearing in the audience commenting on Woffington's performance of Rosalind in William Shakespeare's As You Like It.

Mathews also wrote novels, including My Lady Peggy Goes to Town (1901), a historical romance of an 18th-century woman trying to reconcile with her lover. Mathews penned a sequel, My Lady Peggy Leaves Town (1913).

Frances Aymar Mathews died on 10 September 1925 in New York City and was buried at Trinity Church.

== Bibliography ==
The New Yorkers and other people

- Bigamy (1881).
- To-night at Eight; Comedies and Comediettas (1889).
- The Scapegrace (1890).
- Six to One (1890).
- The Bracelet (1895).
- Wooing a Widow (1895).
- A Soldier of France (1898).
- His Way and Her Will (1900).
- The New Yorkers and Other People (1900).
- My Lady Peggy Goes to Town (1901).
- Pretty Peggy (1902).
- The New Professor (1903).
- A Little Tragedy at Tien-Tsin (1904).
- Pamela Congreve (1904).
- Billy Duane (1905).
- Finding a Father for Flossie (1905).
- The Marquise's Millions (1905).
- The Staircase of Surprise (1905).
- Up Yonder (1905).
- Undefiled (1906).
- All for Sweet Charity (1907).
- Allee Same (1907).
- American Hearts (1907).
- The Apartment (1907).
- At the Grand Central (1907).
- Both Sides of the Counter (1907).
- A Charming Conversationalist (1907).
- The Courier (1907).
- En Voyage (1907).
- The Honeymoon (1907).
- A Knight of the Quill (1907).
- On the Staircase (1907).
- Paying the Piper (1907).
- War to the Knife (1907).
- A Woman's Forever (1907).
- Flame Dancer (1908).
- If David Knew (1910).
- A Finished Coquette (1911).
- Christmas Honeymoon (1912).
- My Lady Peggy Leaves Town (1913).
- Fanny of the Forty Frocks (1916).
