= Mr Foote's Other Leg =

Play written by Ian Kelly

Mr Foote's Other Leg is a 2015 stage adaptation of Mr Foote's Other Leg: Comedy, tragedy and murder in Georgian London, a 2012 biography of the 18th-century actor Samuel Foote. Both the biography and the play were written by Ian Kelly. The play's prelude is an attempt to steal Foote's amputated leg from the Hunterian Collection, but the drama mainly covers the period from Foote's tutelage under Charles Macklin in the 1740s until his involvement in the controversy surrounding Elizabeth Chudleigh in 1774–76.

The play premiered in London at the Hampstead Theatre, running from 14 September to 17 October 2015, directed by Richard Eyre and designed by Tim Hatley, with Kelly himself as George III, Foote played by Simon Russell Beale, David Garrick by Joseph Millson, Jock Hunter by Forbes Masson, Peg Woffington by Dervla Kirwan, Charles Macklin and Benjamin Franklin by Colin Stinton and Frank Barber by Micah Balfour. The production transferred to the West End to the Haymarket Theatre (a theatre previously run by Foote), with performances from 28 October 2015 to 23 January 2016.
