= Christie Johnstone (novel) =

1853 novel by Charles Reade

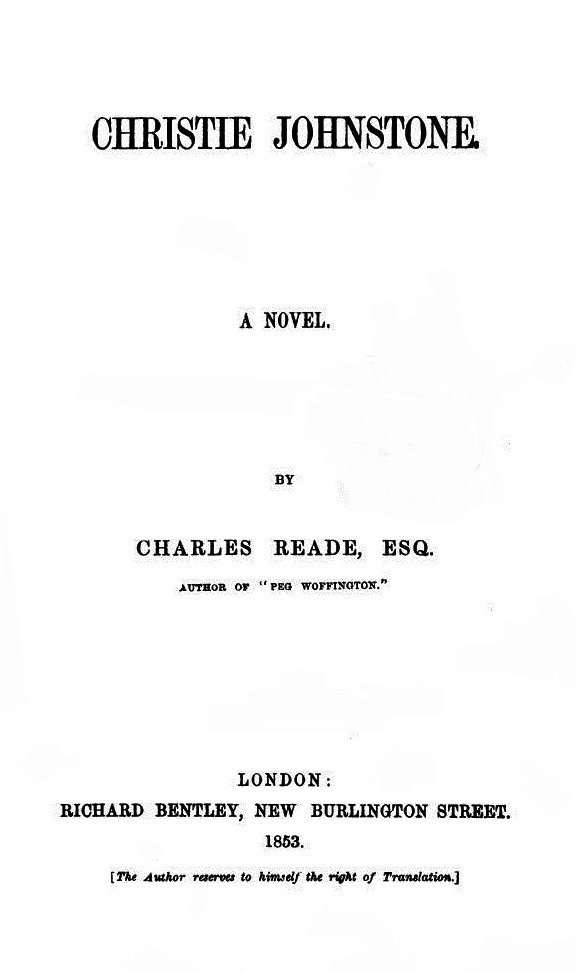
- First edition title page
- Author: Charles Reade
- Language: English
- Publication date: 1853

Christie Johnstone is an 1853 romantic drama novel by the British writer Charles Reade. It follows the adventures of the young and wealthy aristocrat Viscount Ipsden in the course of his efforts to relieve the deserving poor of a Scottish fishing village. It is set in Newhaven near Edinburgh and may have been based on the real life experiences of Reade. It followed up his first major literary success Peg Woffington, released earlier that year.

== Adaptation ==
In 1921 the novel was turned into a silent film Christie Johnstone directed by Norman McDonald and starring Stewart Rome and Gertrude McCoy in the main roles.

== Bibliography ==
- Sutherland, John. The Longman Companion to Victorian Fiction. Routledge, 2014.
