= The Lyons Mail (1916 film) =

- Directed by: Fred Paul
- Screenplay by: Benedict James
- Based on: The Courier of Lyons by Charles Reade
- Produced by: Ideal Film Company
- Starring: H.B. Irving; Nancy Price; Harry Welchman; James Lindsay
- Release date: December 1916
- Country: United Kingdom
- Languages: Silent film English intertitles

The Lyons Mail is a 1916 British silent film directed by Fred Paul and is based on the 1877 play The Lyons Mail by Charles Reade, a very popular stage work of the Victorian era. A respectable French gentleman is mistaken for his doppelganger, a notorious highwaymen.

It was made by the Ideal Film Company, one of the leading British silent film studios. It should not be confused with a later sound version The Lyons Mail released in 1931 by Twickenham Studios. It was released in the United States in 1919.

Only the first quarter of the film survives.

== Cast ==
- H.B. Irving as Lesurques / Dubosc
- Nancy Price as Janette
- Harry Welchman as Andre
- James Lindsay as Courriot
- Tom Reynolds as Founiard
- Windham Guise as Choppard
- Nelson J. Ramsay as Durochat
- Violet Campbell as Julie
- Alfred Brydone as Jerome Lesurques
- Charles Vane
- Teddy Arundell
