= The Lyons Mail (play) =

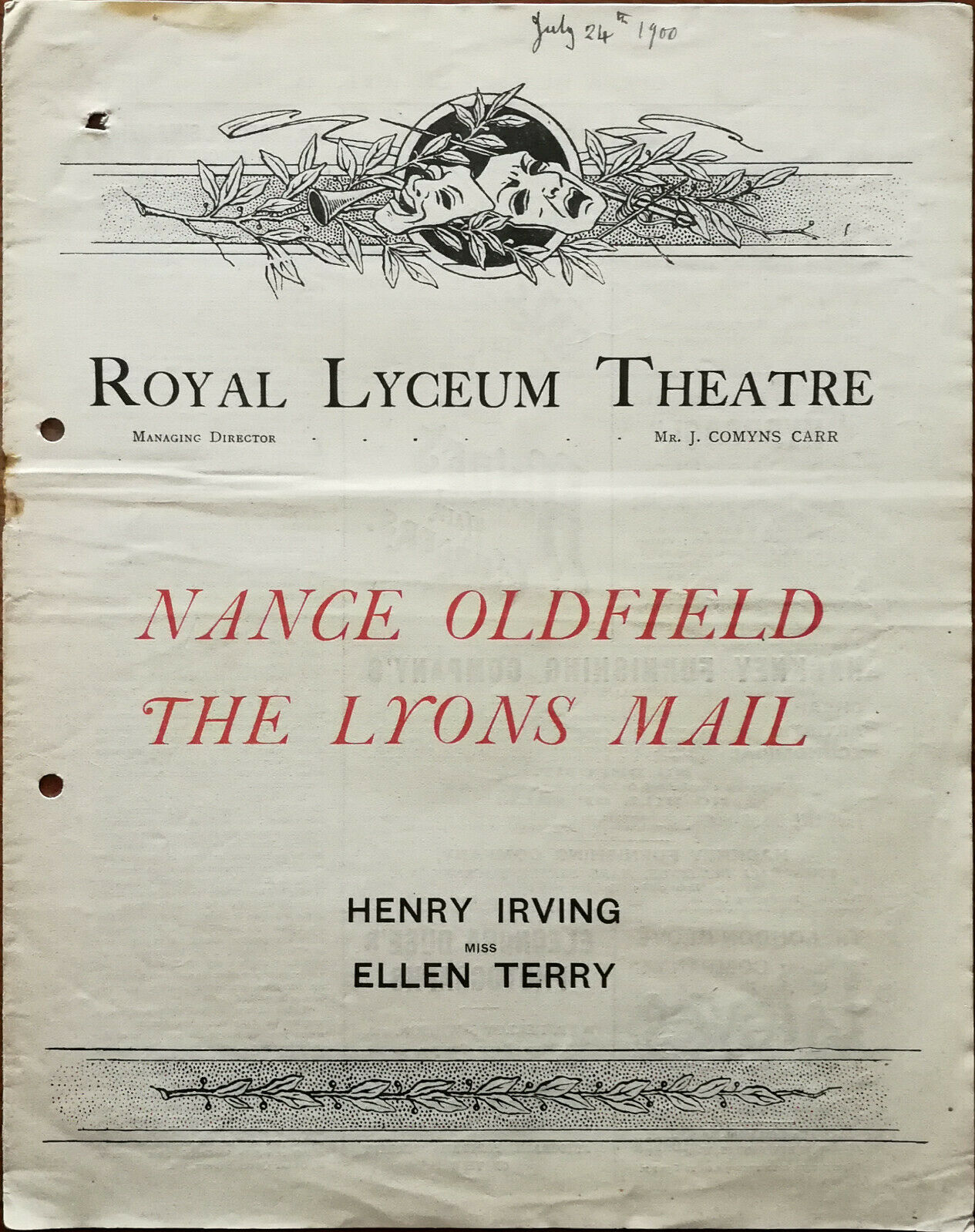
Programme for Henry Irving's revival of The Lyons Mail at the Lyceum Theatre (1900)

The Lyons Mail is an 1877 drama by Charles Reade based on his play The Courier of Lyons (1854). The new version was written for Henry Irving for performance at the Lyceum Theatre.

Reade's play was based on the 1796 Courrier de Lyon case in Revolutionary France, drawing inspiration from a previous play based on the case by the French writers Paul Siraudin and Louis-Mathurin Moreau. Reade had written the play specifically for the actor Charles Kean. It had its début on 26 June 1854 with Queen Victoria and Prince Albert in attendance.

The roles of Joseph Lesurques and Dubosc were played by the same actor. In the original production this was Henry Irving. Later the roles were played by his son H. B. Irving, Bransby Williams (wearing Irving's costumes from the original production) at the Lyceum Theatre (1923) and John Martin Harvey at the Savoy Theatre (1930), who had played Joliquet in the 1891, 1893 and 1898 revivals at the Lyceum, among other actors. At the Lyceum the role of Jeanette was often played by Ellen Terry.

The play's backdrops by Hawes Craven used in the productions at the Lyceum were destroyed in a fire in 1897 at the theatre's scenic store in Bear Lane in Southwark. In 1901 Irving and Ellen Terry took the play alongside Charles I, The Merchant of Venice, Louis XI, Nance Oldfield, The Bells, Waterloo and Madame Sans-Gêne on a tour of the United States where it played at the Knickerbocker Theatre in New York, among other venues.

In 1905 Henry Irving made his farewell tour of the provinces in seven plays for which he was best known including The Lyons Mail. So many supernumerary actors were required that rather than hire local people Irving took his on tour with him.

== Roles ==
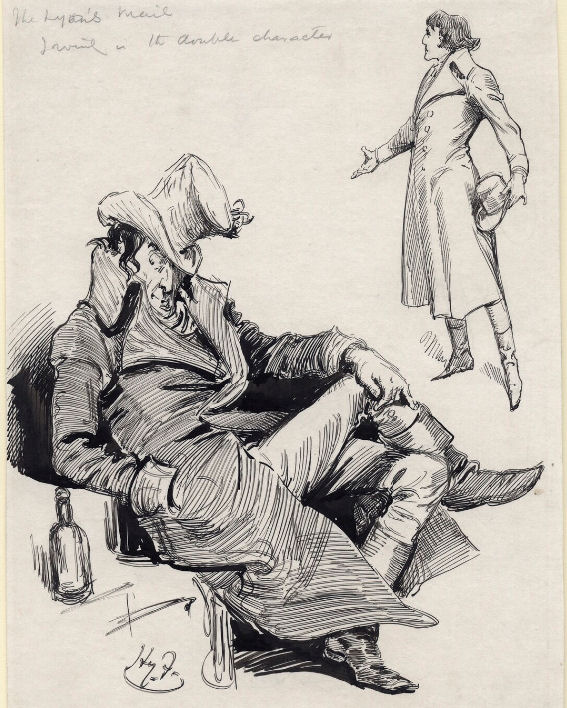
Henry Irving as Lesurques and Dubosc - Harry Furniss (1877)

Cast of the 1893 production at the Lyceum Theatre in London:

- Joseph Lesurques - (Merchant of Paris) - Henry Irving
- Dubosc - (Captain of a gang of 500) - Henry Irving
- Courriol - (Member of the Gang) - William Terriss
- Choppard - (Member of the Gang) - Samuel Johnson
- Fouinard - (Member of the Gang) - John Archer
- Durochat - (Member of the Gang) - W. J. Lorriss
- Jerome Lesurques - (Father of Joseph) - Alfred Bishop
- Dorval - (a Magistrate) - Frank Tyars
- Didier - (betrothed to Julie) - William Haviland
- Joliquet - (Jerome's serving boy) - John Martin-Harvey
- Guerneau - (Friend of Lesurques) - Edward Gordon Craig
- Lambert - (Friend of Lesurques) - L. C. Lacy
- Postmaster of Montgeron - Henry Howe
- Coco - T. Reynolds
- Commissary of Police - H. W. Cushing
- Postilion - J. H. Allen
- Guard - R. P. Tabb
- Waiter - W. Marion
- Julie Lesurques - (Daughter of Joseph) - Amy Coleridge
- Marie - (a Servant) - Miss Foster
- Niece to Postmaster - Kate Phillips
- Jeanette - Jessie Millward

== Synopsis ==
In Act I we are near Paris in France in 1796 where the audience is introduced to the contrasting lives of the central characters, Joseph Lesurques, a rich and respectable self-made man who arrives in Paris for the wedding of his daughter Julie to her fiancé, the merchant Didier. While meeting old friends at a café members of the gang of Dubosc, an escaped convict, thief and drunk also gather. After Lesurques leaves Dubosc arrives. He rejects Jeanette, the mother of his child and conspires with his gang to rob the Lyons Mail. Lesurques's innkeeper father Jerome faces bankruptcy but is too proud to ask his son for help, and while he leaves to find a buyer for his inn his son returns and leaves money for him. Dubosc and his gang meet at the inn which is on a lonely stretch of the road by which the Lyons Mail must pass. Here Dubosc makes his arrangements to waylay the Lyons Mail which they rob while murdering the courier, at the same time making off with the money left by Lesurques for his father. When Jerome returns he confronts Dubosc and believes him to be his son but is shot and wounded.

Act II is set in Lesurques's house in Paris where Julie gives work to Jeanette. Lesurques is wrongly identified by Joliquet the tavern-boy as the robber of the Lyons Mail; he is arrested alongside Courriol and Choppard, two of the real criminals. Jerome believes his son is a member of the criminal gang and offers him a pistol to take the honourable way out, but when Lesurques rejects the offer his father sees him as a coward.

In Act III Lesurques is on trial; his daughter Julie wants to call off her engagement to Didier to save him from shame. However, he turns down her offer and produces evidence that demonstrates her father's innocence. Dubosc gets into the house and destroys the evidence stabbing Julie in his escape. Lesurques having been found guilty is in prison awaiting execution when Julie arrives and explains the case of mistaken identity, which is confirmed by Courriol and Choppard. Julie leads the authorities to Dubosc who has taken a room in a tavern to see Lesurques pass by on his way to execution. He is arrested after a violent struggle and Lesurques is released from custody.

=== Act I. ===
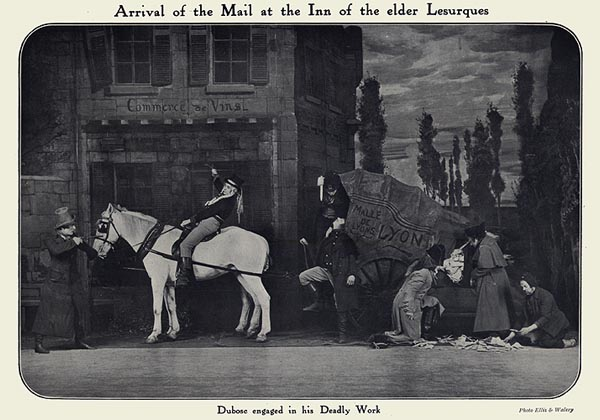
The Arrival of the Lyons Mail - from the 1908 revival at the Shaftesbury Theatre

- Scene I. - A Café
- Scene 2. - A Roadside Inn at Lieursaint
- The Robbery of the Lyons Mail

=== Act II. ===
- Scene. - Lesurques's House

=== Act III ===
- Scene I. - Lesurques's House
- Scene II. - Courtyard of the Prison
- Scene III. - A Garret overlooking the Place of Execution

== Music ==
- Overture - Georges Jacobi
- Waltz - Noche Serend - Maude Valérie White
- Overture - François-Auguste Gevaert

== Production ==
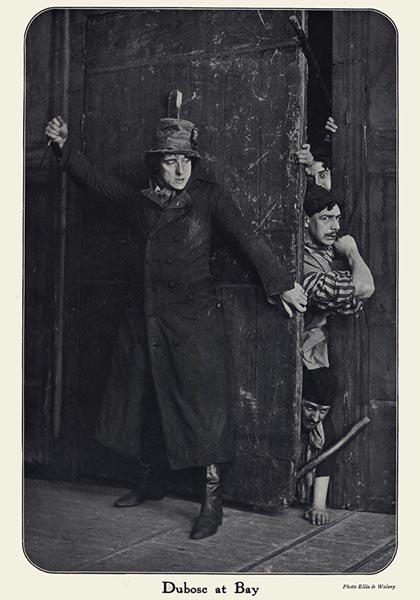
Dubosc at bay - H. B. Irving in the 1908 revival at the Shaftesbury Theatre

The actor John Martin-Harvey, who appeared as Joliquet opposite Irving in the play in the early 1890s, later said of Irving's performance:

Lesurques in his hands bore very little resemblance to a hero in melodrama; he was typical of all that is implied by 'middle-class respectabilty', though perhaps a trifle too distinguished, and might have passed for a younger brother of Doctor Primrose, whom he more nearly resembled than any other of his impersonations....

I have known the audience 'stagger' on the first appearance of Dubosc. Lesurques is hardly out of sight when Dubosc is there in the doorway, grim, sinister, the embodiment of wicked intent. His accomplices cower as he comes among them with contemptuous, insolent tolerance. Then, peremptorily, he issues his orders and from that moment dominates.

Martin-Harvey also recalled that to emphasise the cruelty of Dubosc Irving hummed some bars of La Marseillaise while searching the dead body of the courier, on another night shocking the audience by instead humming 'Nearer, My God, to Thee'. 'The effect was appalling,' Martin-Harvey said. '[In the finale] it is hardly possible to exaggerate the savagery of Irving's performance in that scene, yet never did he overstep the truth of nature and degenerate into extravagance. Dubosc though a monster was a credible human being and it was that fact that gave the play its lasting popularity'.

== Revivals ==
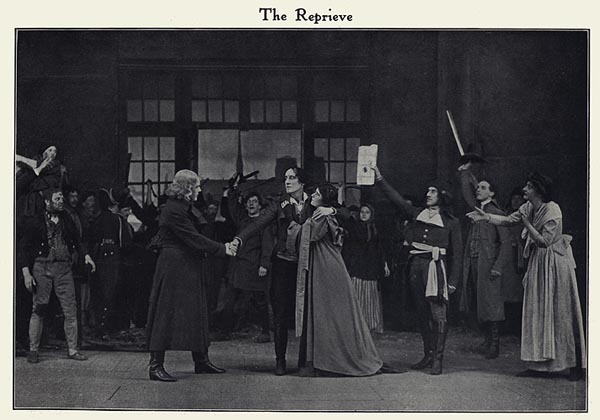
Lesurques is reprieved - H. B. Irving in the 1908 revival at the Shaftesbury Theatre

In 1906 Irving's son H. B. Irving revived The Lyons Mail at the Shaftesbury Theatre in London, himself playing the dual roles of Joseph Lesurques and Dubosc, with his wife Dorothea Baird in the cast.

Mr. H.B. lrving's opening night of the Shaftesbury on Thursday was made historical by the enthusiasm of the audience. Old friends of his distinguished father and many well-wishers gave him a magnificent "send off." He emerged triumphantly from the ordeal of comparison in the great twin parts of Lesurques and Dubosc in The Lyons Mail, that picturesque melodrama which has been given a niche in dramatic fame far above its deserts by the genius of Irving the elder. When at the close on Thursday night Mr. H.B. Irving expressed the hope that he had made the play interesting, both to those to whom it was new and to those who were familiar with it in the old days at the Lyceum, there was one great shout of "You have". The earnestness of the performance could not be resisted, and those who critically opined that it lacked a trifle in power were overwhelmed. The new Irving is worthy to play his father's parts.

The actor Bransby Williams (wearing Irving's costumes from the original production) revived The Lyons Mail at the Lyceum Theatre in 1923 followed by that of John Martin Harvey at the Savoy Theatre in 1930.

== Adaptations ==
There were a number of adaptations of Reade's work, notably a 1916 silent film The Lyons Mail directed by Fred Paul and a 1931 talkie, The Lyons Mail, made at Twickenham Studios by the director Arthur Maude.
