= Lawrence Reade (cricketer, born 1846) =

New Zealand cricketer (1846–1910)

Personal information
- Full name: Lawrence Edward Reade
- Born: 8 November 1846; Gorakhpore, Bengal Presidency, British India
- Died: 17 August 1910 (aged 63); Wellington, New Zealand
- Bowling: Right-arm medium
- Relatives: Edward Anderton Reade (father); Charles Reade (uncle)

Domestic team information
- Years: Team
- 1869/70: Canterbury
- 1871/72–1876/77: Otago

Career statistics
Competition	First-class
Matches	5
Runs scored	114
Batting average	12.66
100s/50s	0/0
Top score	38
Balls bowled	438
Wickets	11
Bowling average	17.36
5 wickets in innings	0
10 wickets in match	0
Best bowling	4/73
Catches/stumpings	5/–
- Source: Cricinfo, 29 April 2017

Lawrence Edward Reade (8 November 1846 – 17 August 1910) was a New Zealand solicitor and cricketer. He played first-class cricket for Canterbury and Otago between the 1869–70 and 1876–77 seasons.

== Early life and family ==
Lawrence Reade was born in British India, where his father, Edward Anderton Reade, was an administrator for the East India Company in the Bengal Presidency. One of Lawrence's uncles was the novelist Charles Reade. Lawrence attended Tonbridge School in Kent where he played in the school cricket XI in his final year, before moving to New Zealand in 1869 and completing his legal studies in Dunedin. He moved to Oamaru in 1873, and in 1875 was admitted to the bar.

== Cricket career ==
Reade was a batsman and a "right-hand medium-paced bowler, with a graceful delivery". Playing for Otago against Canterbury in 1870–71 he top-scored in each innings with 33 and 22 and also had Otago's best bowling figures of 4 for 73. He made his highest score of 38 against Canterbury in 1873–74, when he put on a partnership of 96 for the second wicket in a match in which Canterbury's two innings totalled only 116. When James Lillywhite's XI made short work of Southland in 1876–77, Reade, Southland's captain, top-scored in each innings, with 8 and 10.

He retained his interest in cricket as a player and an umpire for the rest of his life.

== Later career and personal life ==
Reade married Margaret Hannah Booth in Oamaru on 15 March 1876. They lived in several places in New Zealand and Australia. He was elected mayor of the Borough of East Invercargill in 1884, and practiced law in the city. During the 1880s he served as a commissioner with the Supreme Courts of Tasmania and New South Wales and later ran the Intestacy Department at the Public Trust Office in Wellington until 1902 when he settled in Foxton, Manawatu, where Reade worked as a solicitor.

They had three sons. Margaret died on 14 August 1908, aged 60. On 2 July 1910, while visiting a son in Wellington, Lawrence fell from a tram and suffered a head injury. After an apparently successful operation he began to suffer fits and died after a second operation on 17 August aged 63.
