= Edward Anderton Reade =

British civil servant in India (1807-1886)

Edward Anderton Reade, CB (15 March 1807 – 12 February 1886)^{,} was a British civil servant in India who served in Bengal from 1826 to 1860.

== Career ==
On 10 February 1835 Reade was appointed as Joint Magistrate and Deputy Collector of Belah. On 8 September 1836 he was appointed as Magistrate & Collector of Goruckpore. He was given additional responsibility, on 24 October 1836, as Deputy Opium Agent for management of provision of opium in Goruckpore. He remained collector of Goruckpore (at least) till October 1844.

During 1857 Reade was Commissioner of the Fifth Division and Commissioner of the Benares Division. From 10 September 1857 to 30 September 1857 he held the position of Lieutenant-Governor of the North-Western Provinces as an In charge (acting). He retired from the East India Company in 1860 and returned to the family home in Ipsden, Oxfordshire, where he served as a magistrate for Oxfordshire and Berkshire.

He was a brother of the novelist Charles Reade, and the father of the New Zealand cricketer Lawrence Reade.

== Works ==
His works include:

- Minute on the Roads in the Azimgurh District

Government offices
Preceded by J. R. Colvin	Lieutenant Governor of the North-Western Provinces; Acting; 10 September 1857 – 30 September 1857	Succeeded by Colonel H. Fraser
