= Griffith Gaunt =

English novel by Charles Reade, 1866

Griffith Gaunt, or Jealousy
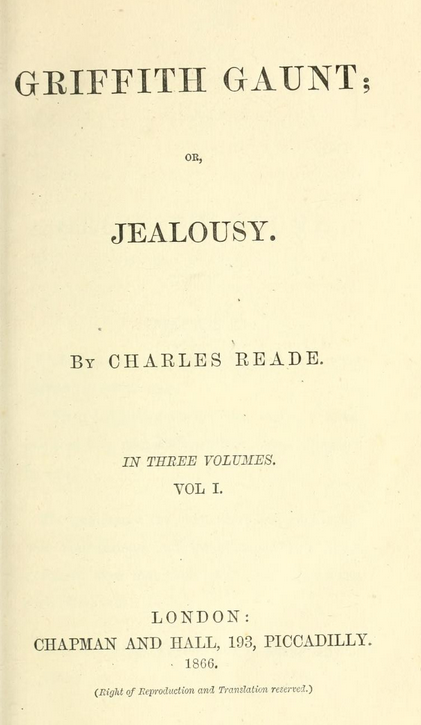
- Title page to Vol. 1 of first U.K. edition (1866)
- Author: Charles Reade
- Illustrator: William Small (Argosy serialization)
- Language: English
- Genre: Novel
- Publisher: Chapman & Hall (London); Ticknor and Fields (Boston)
- Publication date: 17 October 1866 (U.K.)
- Media type: Print (Hardcover)
- Pages: English 1866 ed. 3 volumes: 302, 318, 328; U.S., 1 vol. 218 p.

Griffith Gaunt, or Jealousy is an 1866 sensation novel by Charles Reade. A best-selling book in its day, it was thought by Reade to be his best novel, but critics and posterity have generally preferred The Cloister and the Hearth (1861).

== Background ==
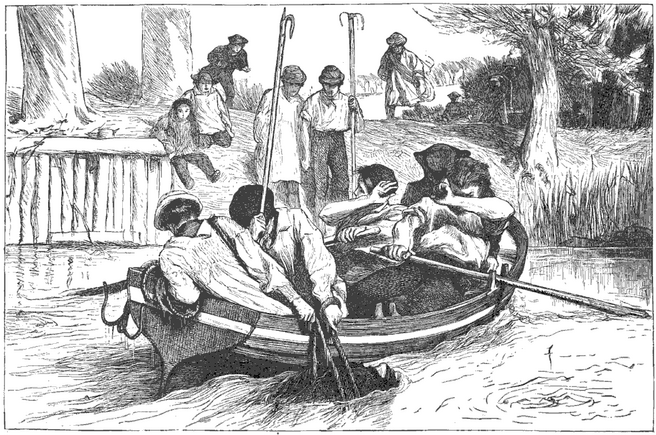
Illustration by William Small, first appeared in Argosy serialization

Reade's Hearth, set in the 15th century, was not especially successful when released in 1861. Reade decided the public "don't care about the dead," and so endeavoured to focus on more contemporary topics of scandal, while still trying to convey a social purpose in his work. First serialized in the new British Argosy magazine, with illustrations by William Small, and in the American The Atlantic (December 1865 – November 1866), Gaunt delivered "a highly colored story of bigamy, murder, and mistaken identity among eighteenth-century gentry" with "almost pathological sensationalism". Attacks on the book's morality came mainly from the American press, not the English.

The New York Round Table said the novel was "indecent" and even the "lowest sensational weekly papers" would not publish it. Extracts from the review reappeared in other papers, including the London Review. Reade penned letters of rebuke to newspaper editors, including one entitled "The Prurient Prude", which was republished widely. As the New York Herald commented, the attacks on the book's morality and Reade's responses gave it great popularity, and they "fear to injure the popularity of Griffith Gaunt by stating that it is not a whit immoral nor dangerous."

Reade, suing for defamation, had the actor and elocutionist George Vandenhoff read much of the novel to the jury. Reade was awarded six cents and gained extra publicity for his book. Reade's friendly fellow novelist Wilkie Collins sought to have Charles Dickens testify on Reade's behalf at the trial. Dickens declined, finding it "the work of a highly accomplished writer and a good man", but with passages he would not have published himself.

In a much-followed American scandal and a six-month trial in 1875, Henry Ward Beecher was sued by Theodore Tilton for committing adultery with his wife Elizabeth. Elizabeth claimed in part that her actions were influenced by reading Gaunt, and the novel was dissected in depth at the trial.

Malcolm Elwin's 1931 biography of Reade called Gaunt "one of the most important novels of its generation". Henry James also wrote favourably of "the much abused" novel.

== Plot summary ==
Here is a plot summary taken from a 1917 anthology of literature:

Griffith Gaunt, a gentleman without fortune, marries Catharine Peyton, a Cumberland heiress, who is a devout Roman Catholic. After living happily together for eight years, the couple—each of whom has a violent temper, in the husband combined with insane jealousy—are gradually estranged by Catharine's spiritual adviser, Father Leonard, an eloquent young priest. Griffith discovers his wife and Leonard under apparently suspicious circumstances; and after a violent scene he rides away, with the intention of never returning. He reaches an inn in an adjoining county, where he is nursed through a fever by the innkeeper's daughter, Mercy Vint. Assuming the name of his illegitimate brother, Thomas Leicester, to whom he bears a superficial resemblance, he marries Mercy. Returning to his old home to obtain a sum of money belonging to him, he is reconciled to Catharine by her earlier adviser, Father Francis. Under a false pretext he goes back to the inn to break with Mercy; but finding it more difficult than he had anticipated, he defers final action, and returns to Cumberland. Here he is received by Catharine with furious reproaches and threats against his life; his crime having been disclosed to her through the real Leicester, and her maid Caroline Ryder. Griffith disappears; a few days after, a body that is discovered in the mere near the house is identified as his. Mrs. Gaunt is indicted for his murder, and pleads her own cause. The trial is going against her, when Mercy appears and proves that Griffith is alive, and that the body is that of Leicester. Griffith and Catharine are again reconciled, and Mercy marries Catharine's former lover, Sir George Neville. The scene is laid in the middle of the 18th century.

== Adaptations ==
The novel was soon adapted for the stage by Augustin Daly to capitalize on its success. The book form was released in October 1866 – Daly wrote the play in four days, and it received its first performance on 7 November 1866 at the New York Theatre with John K. Mortimer and Rose Eytinge in the lead roles. It ran for six weeks. A second adaptation also appeared soon.

The novel was later dramatised by Reade himself as Kate Peyton's Lovers by the early 1870s and revised and performed as Jealousy in 1878.

The American humorist Charles Henry Webb released a parody entitled Liffith Lank, or Lunacy.
