= The Cloister and the Hearth =

1861 novel by Charles Reade

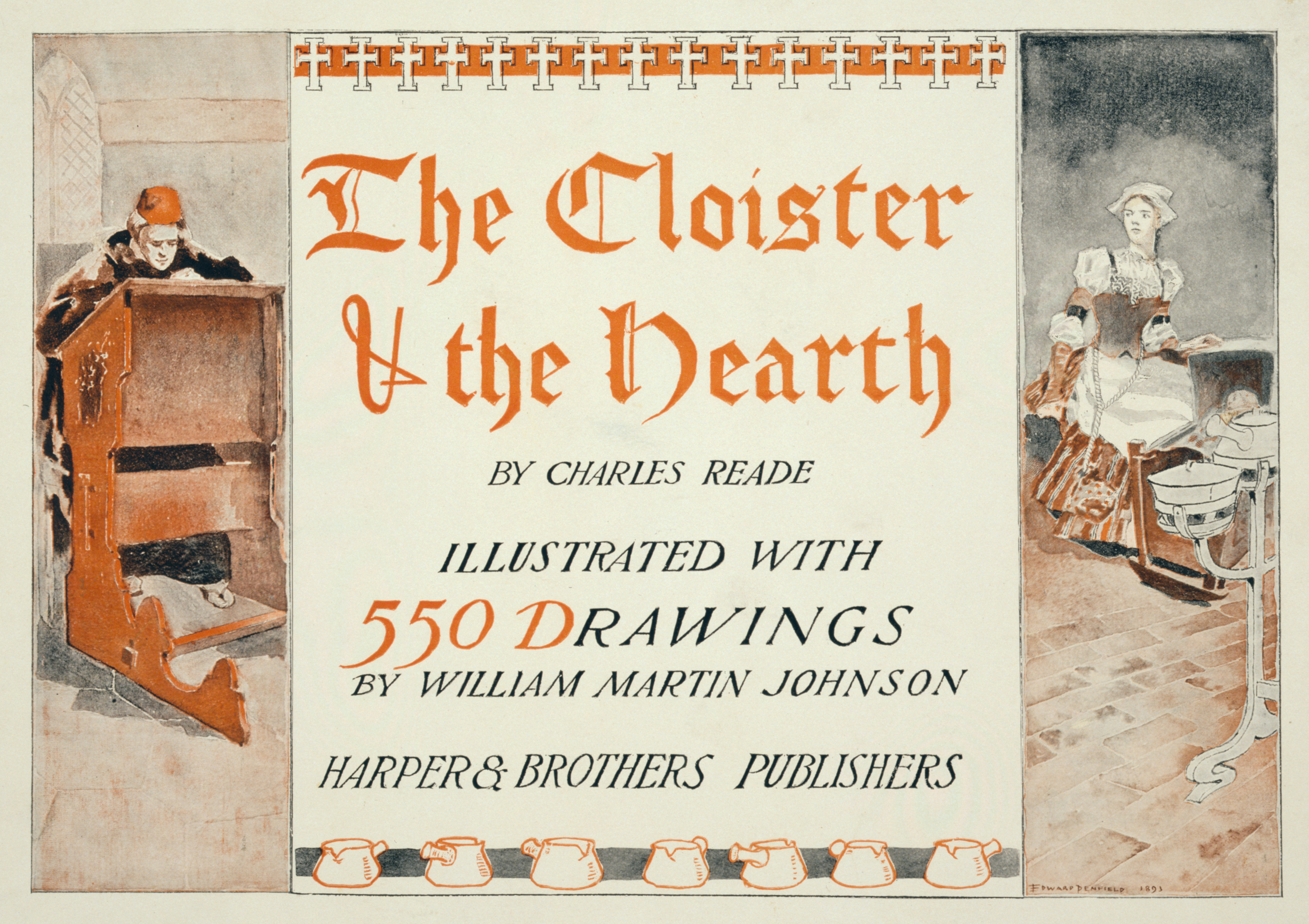
1893 poster by Edward Penfield advertising a US edition of The Cloister & the Hearth

The Cloister and the Hearth (1861) is a historical novel by British author Charles Reade. Set in the 15th century, it relates the travels of a young scribe and illuminator, Gerard Eliassoen, through several European countries. The Cloister and the Hearth often describes the events, people and their practices in minute detail. Its main theme is the struggle between man's obligations to family and to Church.

Based on a few lines by the humanist Erasmus about the life of his parents, the novel began as a serial in Once a Week magazine in 1859 under the title "A Good Fight", but when Reade disagreed with the proprietors of the magazine over some of the subject matter (principally the unmarried pregnancy of the heroine), he curtailed the serialisation with a false happy ending. Reade continued to work on the novel and published it in 1861, thoroughly revised and extended, as The Cloister and the Hearth.

== Plot ==
Married to Margaret Brandt, Gerard sets off to Rome from Holland to escape the persecution of a vicious burgomaster as well as to earn money for the support of his family. Margaret awaits his return in Holland and in the meantime gives birth to his son. As Gerard is the favourite of his parents, his two lazy and jealous brothers decide to divert him from Holland and receive a larger share of fortune after their parents' death. They compose and dispatch a letter to Gerard informing him falsely that Margaret has died. Gerard believes the news and, stricken by grief, gives himself to a dissolute life and even attempts suicide. After being saved from death by chance, he takes vows and becomes a Dominican friar. Later Gerard preaches throughout Europe and, while in Holland, discovers that Margaret is alive. He is afraid of temptation and to shun Margaret becomes a hermit. Margaret discovers Gerard's hiding place and convinces him to come back to normal life in which he becomes a vicar of a small town. Gerard and Margaret no longer live as a man and wife, but nevertheless see each other several times a week. A few years pass, Gerard's son grows up and is sent to a private school. After a decade reunited, Margaret catches the plague and dies; Gerard re-enters the monastery and dies shortly after. He is buried with a lock of Margaret's hair on his chest.

The author of The Cloister and the Hearth, at the end of this story, reveals that Margaret's and Gerard's son, also named Gerard, became the great Catholic scholar and Humanist, Erasmus of Rotterdam, a major historical figure. Indeed, little is actually known about Erasmus' actual parentage (apparently illegitimate), though his parents were in reality named Margaret Roger and Gerard. Reade was apparently using his imagination to fill in some historical gaps in Erasmus' background. The Cloister and the Hearth may be read as anti-Catholic, as it presents Catholic discipline regarding the celibate priesthood as an obstacle preventing Margaret's and Gerard's love from continuing to be consummated.

== Critical appraisal ==
Arthur Conan Doyle named this as his favourite novel, saying that

I do not know where I can find a book in which the highest qualities of head and of heart go together as they do in this one.

In the Sir Arthur Conan Doyle Archive at the Harry Ransom Center in Austin, Texas, there is a document list of Doyle's 18 favourite things. When asked who his favourite heroine in fiction was, he replied, "Margaret" in Cloister and Hearth.

I know no scene in fiction which affects me so powerfully as the death of Margaret.

Doyle compliments the quantity of minute detail giving the feeling of daily life in the 1400s, from a clean Dutch home to a slovenly medieval German Inn to conflicted pre-Renaissance Rome. He incidentally mentions clothing, hobbies, morals, attitudes, and popular outlook at the end of the Middle Ages. On the downside he mentions

… the imperfections, the irritating and superficial tricks of manner, are so obtrusive that they catch the eye… His style can be abrupt, jerky, and incoherent to an exasperating extent …

Thomas Wolfe also considered the novel his favourite work of fiction.

Arthur Machen, in his short story "The Islington Mystery, contrasted the work with George Eliot's Romola:

If the crowd runs after the false, it must neglect the true. The intolerable "Romola" is praised; the admirable "Cloister and the Hearth" is waived aside.

Rudyard Kipling, discussing his masterpiece Kim (in his autobiography Something of Myself) said he had wanted to write something “worthy to lie alongside” Cloister. ‘Not being able to do this, I dismissed the ambition as ‘beneath the thinking mind. So does a half-blind man dismiss shooting and golf.’

Sir Walter Besant, writing in the novel's introduction, gave this opinion:

"The Cloister and the Hearth" is Charles Reade's greatest work—and, I believe, the greatest historical novel in the language… there is portrayed so vigorous, lifelike, and truthful a picture of a time long gone by, and differing in almost every particular from our own, that the world has never seen its like. To me it is a picture of the past more faithful than anything in the works of Scott.

In "The Decay of Lying," Oscar Wilde praised the novel as Reade's "one beautiful book", after which he "wasted the rest of his life in a foolish attempt to be modern." Conversely, George Orwell wrote, "Since Charles Reade's books are published in cheap editions one can assume that he still has his following, but it is unusual to meet anyone who has voluntarily read him. In most people his name seems to evoke, at most, a vague memory of 'doing' The Cloister and the Hearth as a school holiday task," going on to write, "Reade wrote several dull books, and The Cloister and the Hearth is one of them," after which he praised his modern productions Foul Play, Hard Cash, and It Is Never Too Late to Mend.

== Screen adaptation ==
The Cloister and the Hearth (UK, 1913) was a silent film, directed by Cecil M. Hepworth.

== Comic book adaptation ==
In December 1949, the Gilberton Company published a graphic novel version of The Cloister and the Hearth as No. 66 in its popular Classics Illustrated series. The book was adapted by Leslie Katz and illustrated by Henry C. Kiefer in a style comic historian William B. Jones called "an interesting collection of some of the artist's best and worst work, from handsomely rendered, historically accurate figures to ludicrously scaled perspectives."
