= The King's Rival =

1854 play

- Written by: Tom Taylor and Charles Reade
- Genre: Historical
- Setting: Restoration England, 1667

Premiere
- Date: 4 October 1854
- Place: St James's Theatre, London

The King's Rival is a historical play co-authored by the British writers Tom Taylor and Charles Reade. It takes place during the Restoration Era during the reign of Charles II. It was one of four plays the two men co-wrote, including Masks and Faces.

The play debuted at St James's Theatre in London's West End on 4 October 1854. The cast included George Vandenhoff as Charles II, Tom Mead as the Duke of Richmond, Isabella Glyn as Frances Stewart and Laura Seymour as Nell Gwyn. John Lawrence Toole made his debut playing Samuel Pepys. The play was published later the same year by Richard Bentley.

== Synopsis ==
While attending the theatre Charles II takes a fancy to one of the actresses, Frances Stewart, and pursues her. However, she is in love with the Duke of Richmond, leading to an awkward rejection. However, Nell Gwyn manages to resolve matters, leading to a happy ending.

== Bibliography ==
- Kabatchnik, Amnon. Blood on the Stage, 1800 to 1900: Milestone Plays of Murder, Mystery, and Mayhem. Rowman & Littlefield, 2017.
- Nicoll, Allardyce . A History of English Drama 1660-1900, Volume 4. Cambridge University Press, 2009.
- Taylor, Tom & Reade, Charles. The King's Rival: A Drama, in Five Acts.
