= Samuel Phillips (journalist) =

English journalist

Samuel Phillips (28 December 1814 – 14 October 1854) was an English journalist.

== Life ==
Phillips was born in London, the son of a Jewish tradesman. He was educated at University College London, and then at Göttingen. Having renounced the Jewish faith, he returned to England and entered Sidney Sussex College, Cambridge University, with the design of taking orders. His father's death, however, meant that he could not afford to stay at Cambridge longer than a term, and in 1841 he took to literary work. He wrote a novel, Caleb Stukely (1854), and other tales, and about 1845 began a connection with The Times as literary critic. In the following year he purchased the John Bull newspaper, and edited it for a year. Two volumes of his essays from The Times appeared in 1852 and 1854. Phillips took an active part in the formation of the Crystal Palace Company, and wrote their descriptive guides. In 1852 the University of Göttingen conferred upon him the honorary degree of LL.D. He died in Brighton.

== Sources ==
- Courtney, William Prideaux (1896). "Phillips, Samuel" . In Lee, Sidney (ed.). Dictionary of National Biography. Vol. 45. London: Smith, Elder & Co.
- Courtney, W. P.; Banerji, Nilanjana. "Phillips, Samuel (1814–1854)". Oxford Dictionary of National Biography (online ed.). Oxford University Press. doi:10.1093/ref:odnb/22169. (Subscription, Wikipedia Library access or UK public library membership required.)
