= Hard Cash (novel) =

1863 novel by Charles Reade

- Title page for Hard Cash, A Matter-of-Fact Romance (1863)
- Author: Charles Reade
- Genre: Novel
- Publisher: Sampson Low, Son & Marston
- Publication date: 10 December 1863
- Publication place: London, United Kingdom
- Media type: Print (hardcover)
- Pages: 3 vol. (original edition)
- OCLC: 5103830

Hard Cash, A Matter-of-Fact Romance is an 1863 novel by Charles Reade. The novel is about the poor treatment of patients in insane asylums and was part of Reade's drive to reform and improve those institutions.

== Background ==
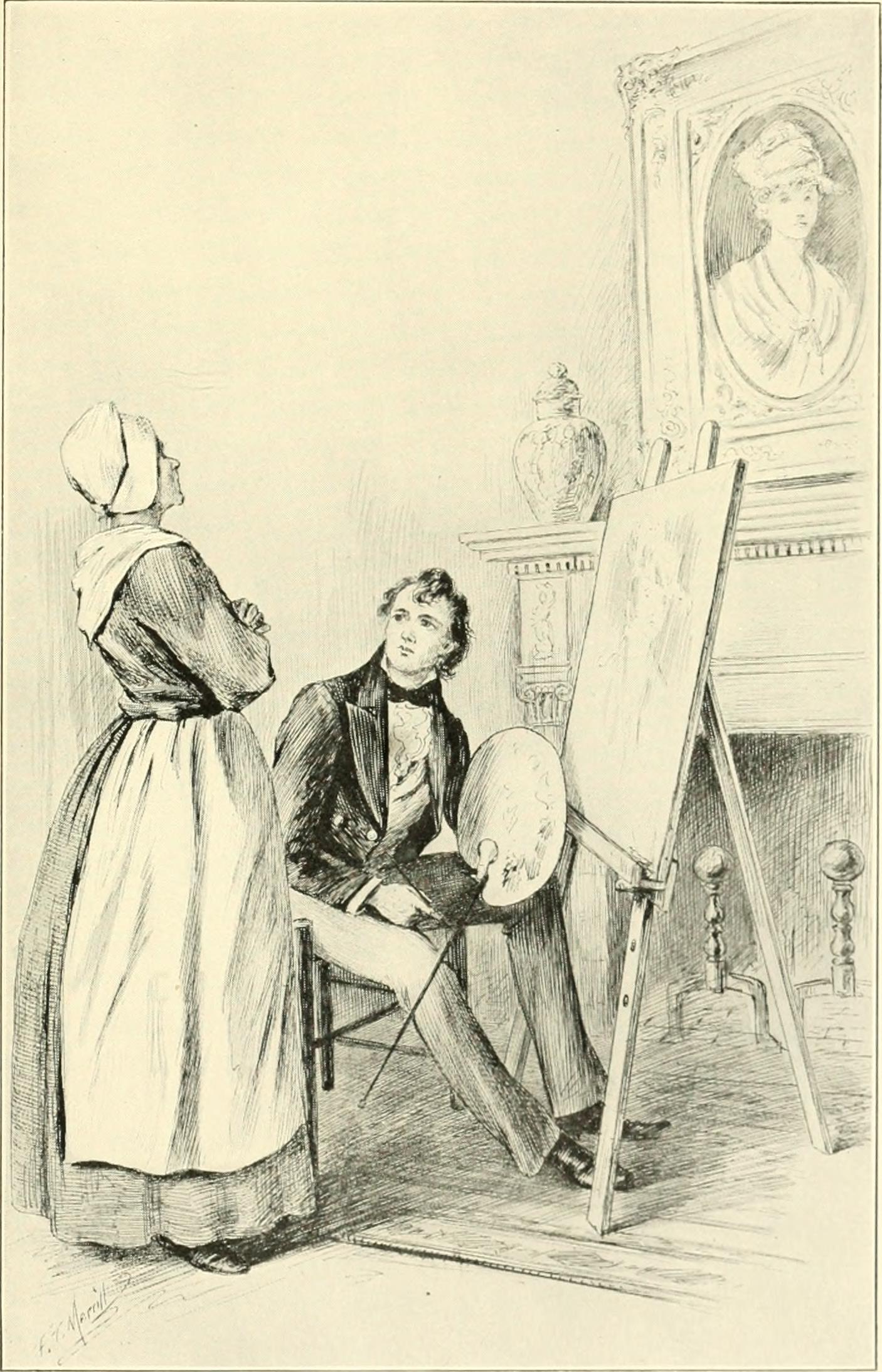
From a later illustrated edition of novel

It was originally serialised under the title Very Hard Cash in Charles Dickens' All the Year Round from 28 March to 26 December 1863, but the magazine's family readers blanched at Reade's strong attacks on asylums, so it did not perform well and actually depressed sales of the periodical. Dickens appended a note to the last instalment noting that the opinions of the work should be attributed to the author, not the periodical.

Reade's work did better when released (with some reordering and amendment of the text, less concerned with creating instalment cliffhangers) as Hard Cash in three-volume book form by Sampson Low in December 1863. Reade sought £3,000 for the publishing rights, later accepted £2,250 for a limited term of years, but eventually only sold it via commissions from the publisher. Publisher Edward Marston later commented that "Reade was an excellent man of business, and was very careful of the commodity which furnished the title of his book."

In the United States, the book was serialised in Harper's Weekly, and then published in January 1864 by Harper & Brothers without the change in title.

Subsequent editions of the novel included some of the correspondence generated by physicians in response to the original publication.

== Synopsis ==
A late nineteenth-century synopsis of the novel:

This book, originally published in 1863, as Very Hard Cash is an alleged “exposure” of the abuses of private insane asylums in England and of the statutes under which they were sheltered. The “Hard Cash” is the sum of £14,000, the earnings of years, of which Richard Hardie, a bankrupt banker, defrauds David Dodd, a sea-captain. Dodd has a cataleptic shock and goes insane on realizing his loss. Hardie's son Alfred loves Julia, Dodd's daughter. He detects his father's villainy, accuses him of it, and to insure his silence is consigned by his father to a private insane asylum. There he meets Dodd; a fire breaks out, and both escape. Dodd enlists and serves as a common seaman, appearing to be capable but half-witted, until a second cataleptic shock restores his reason, when he returns home. Alfred reaches his friends, and vindicates his sanity in a court of law. The receipt for the £14,000 is found, and the money recovered from the elder Hardie. The book properly divides itself into two parts. One embraces the maritime adventures of Dodd with pirates, storms, shipwreck, and highwaymen, while bringing his money home; and his subsequent service as a half-witted foremast-hand until his restoration to reason. The other covers Alfred's thrilling experiences as a sane man among the insane. The author's analysis of all kinds of insanity is very thorough: with Alfred are contrasted Captain Dodd and many asylum patients, introduced incidentally; also Maxley, a worthy man driven insane by the bank failure, and who kills Alfred's sister in a maniacal rage; Dr. Wycherley, the asylum manager, who has epileptic fits himself; Thomas Hardie, Alfred's uncle, who is weak-minded; and others. Dr. Sampson, the sturdy Scotch physician, who despises all regular practitioners, and comes to Alfred’s rescue at the crisis of the book, is one of Reade’s strongest and most original characters. The love scenes are tender and touching. Hard Cash is in some sense a sequel to Love me Little, Love me Long which relates the early history and marriage of Captain and Mrs. Dodd. This book caused much lively public correspondence between the author and various asylum managers, who felt themselves aggrieved, but failed, according to Reade, to shake the facts and arguments put forward in this book.

== Adaptations ==
The novel was adapted to film three times in the silent film era.

The first was in 1910 by Independent Moving Pictures Co.

In 1913, a 2-reel American silent film was directed by Charles M. Seay for Edison Manufacturing Company, with a cast that included Charles Stanton Ogle, May Abbey, Gertrude McCoy, and Bigelow Cooper.

In 1921, a British silent-film was released, directed by Edwin J. Collins and starring Dick Webb, Alma Green, and Frank Arlton.
