= Peg Woffington (novel) =

1853 novel

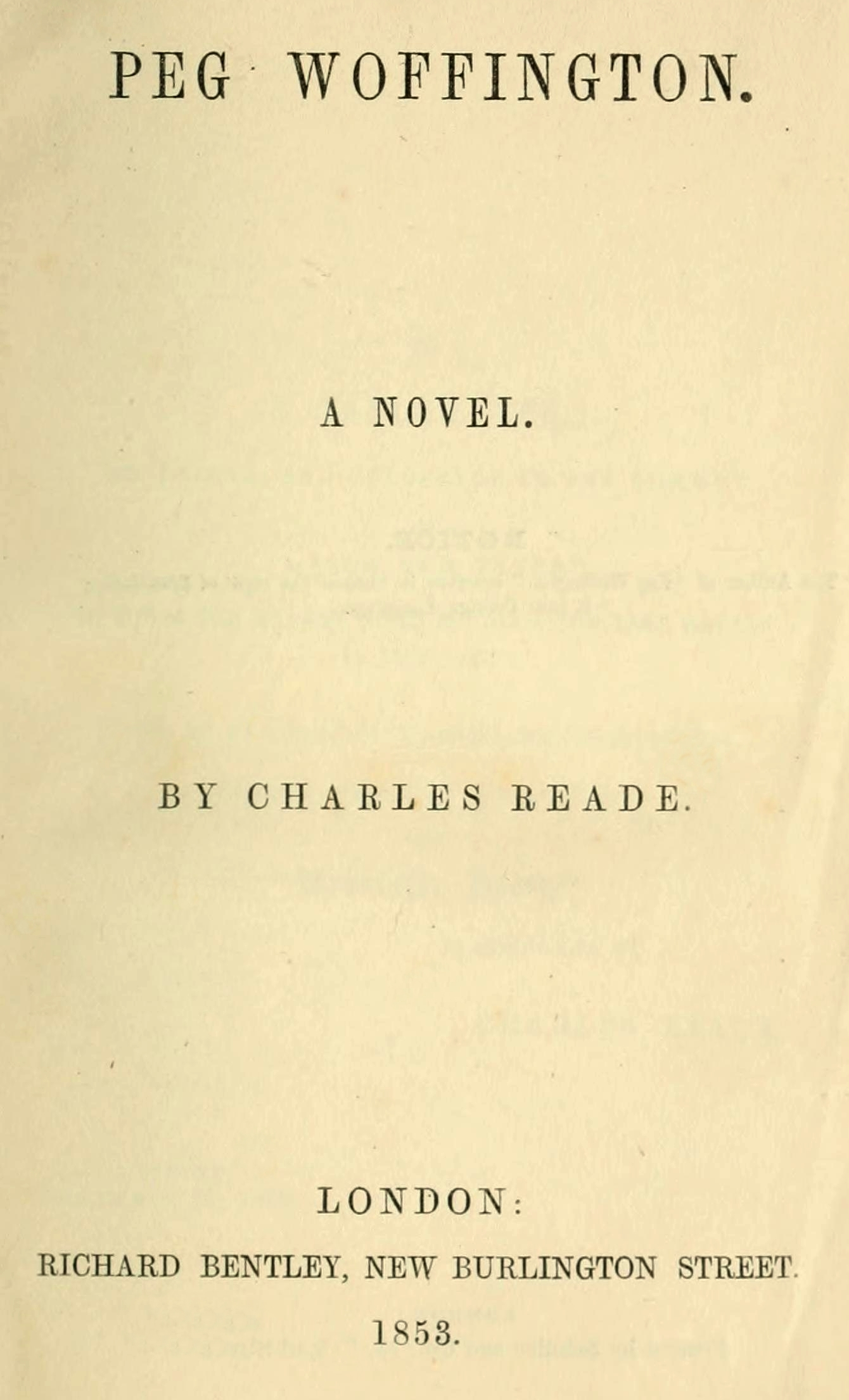
- First edition title page
- Author: Charles Reade
- Language: English
- Genre: Historical
- Publication date: 1853
- Publication place: United Kingdom
- Media type: Print

Peg Woffington is an 1853 novel by the British author Charles Reade. It was inspired by the popular stage play Masks and Faces which he had co-written with Tom Taylor the previous year. Reade portrayed the London success of the Irish actress Peg Woffington (1720–1760) and featured other prominent figures of the days such as David Garrick.

== Bibliography ==
- Sutherland, John. The Longman Companion to Victorian Fiction. Routledge, 2014.
