= The Courier of Lyons =

Play by Charles Reade

The Courier of Lyons is a play by the English writer Charles Reade, which was first performed in 1854. He based it on the 1796 Courrier de Lyon case in Revolutionary France, drawing inspiration from a previous play based on the case by the French writers Paul Siraudin and Louis-Mathurin Moreau.

Reade wrote the play specifically for the actor Charles Kean. It had its début on 26 June 1854, with Queen Victoria and Prince Albert in attendance, and an initial run of twenty-six performances. It was revived frequently, and proved so popular that it soon spawned a number of pirated versions. Reade commented in 1855 that it had been seen in nearly every theatre in London.

Reade in 1877 wrote a revised version for the actor Henry Irving under the title The Lyons Mail, a name by which the original play is sometimes known as well.

== Adaptations ==
There were a number of adaptations of Reade's work, notably a 1916 silent film The Lyons Mail directed by Fred Paul and a 1931 talkie, The Lyons Mail, made at Twickenham Studios by the director Arthur Maude.

== Bibliography ==
- Hammet, Michael, Plays by Charles Reade (Cambridge: Cambridge University Press, 1986)
