= Masks and Faces (play) =

Play by Charles Reade and Tom Taylor

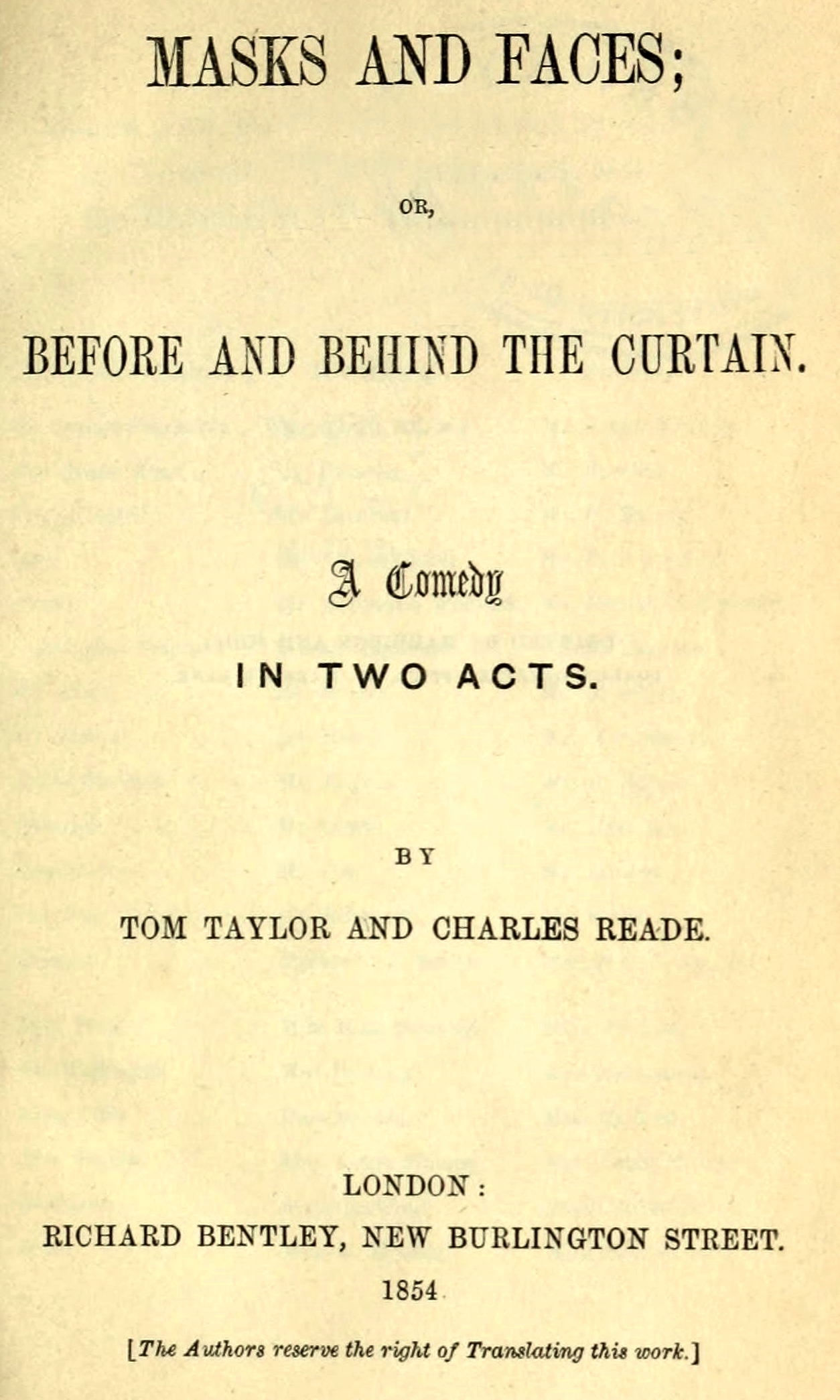
First book edition title page (1854)

Masks and Faces is a British historical comedy play written by Charles Reade and Tom Taylor which was first performed in 1852. It features the Irish actress Peg Woffington (1720–1760) as a major character. It proved popular, earning the writers £150. The following year, to capitalize on the play's success Reade wrote a novel Peg Woffington which was also a major hit.

== Adaptations ==
The play and the subsequent novel provided inspiration for a number of films, mostly made during the silent era. These included Peg Woffington (1912), Masks and Faces (1917) and Peg of Old Drury (1935).

== Bibliography ==
- Sutherland, John. The Longman Companion to Victorian Fiction. Routledge, 2014.
