= Tom Taylor (dramatist) =

English playwright (1817–1880)

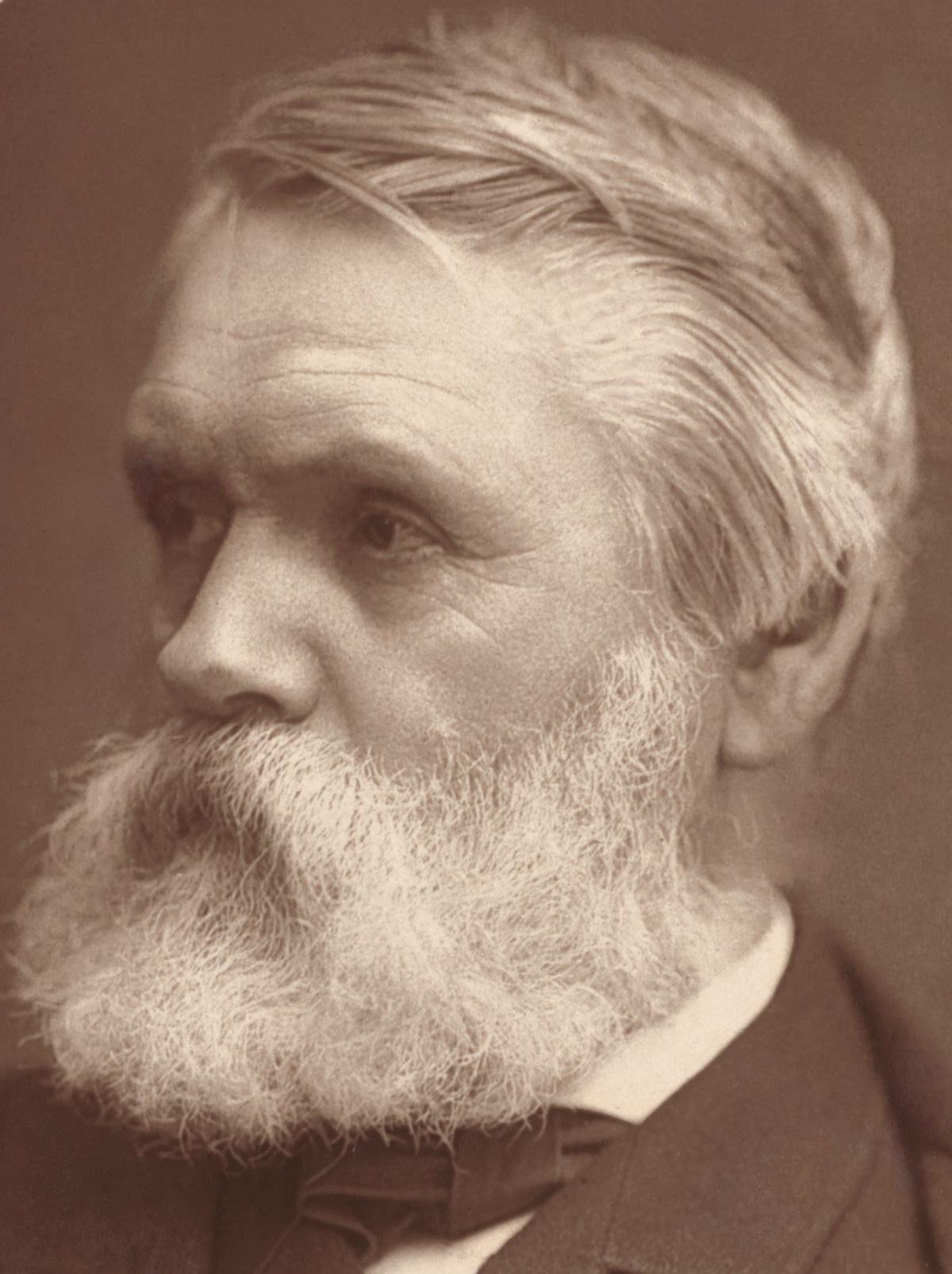
Tom Taylor

Tom Taylor (19 October 1817 – 12 July 1880) was an English dramatist, critic, biographer, public servant, and editor of Punch magazine. Taylor had a brief academic career, holding the professorship of English literature and language at University College, London in the 1840s, after which he practised law and became a civil servant. At the same time he became a journalist, most prominently as a contributor to, and eventually editor of, Punch, a humour magazine.

In addition to these vocations, Taylor began a theatre career and became best known as a playwright, with up to 100 plays staged during his career. Many were adaptations of French plays, but these and his original works cover a range from farce to melodrama. Most fell into neglect after Taylor's death, but Our American Cousin (1858), which achieved great success in the 19th century, remains famous as the piece that was being performed in the presence of Abraham Lincoln when he was assassinated in 1865.

== Life and career ==
=== Early years ===
Taylor was born into a newly wealthy family at Bishopwearmouth, a suburb of Sunderland, in north-east England. He was the second son of Thomas Taylor (1769–1843) and his wife, Maria Josephina, née Arnold (1784–1858). His father had begun as a labourer on a small farm in Cumberland and had risen to become co-owner of a flourishing brewery in Durham. After attending the Grange School in Sunderland, and studying for two sessions at the University of Glasgow, Taylor became a student of Trinity College, Cambridge in 1837, was elected to a scholarship in 1838, and graduated with a BA in both classics and mathematics. He was elected a fellow of the college in 1842 and received his MA degree the following year.

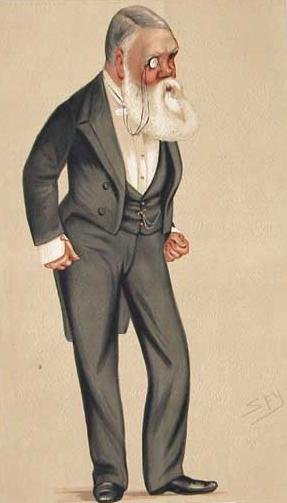
Caricature of Taylor by "Spy" in Vanity Fair, 1876

Taylor left Cambridge in late 1844 and moved to London, where for the next two years he pursued three careers simultaneously. He was professor of English language and literature at University College, London, while at the same time studying to become a barrister, and beginning his life's work as a writer. Taylor was called to the bar of the Middle Temple in November 1846. He resigned his university post, and practised on the northern legal circuit until he was appointed assistant secretary of the Board of Health in 1850. On the reconstruction of the board in 1854 he was made secretary, and on its abolition in 1858 his services were transferred to a department of the Home Office, retiring on a pension in 1876.

=== Writer ===
Taylor owed his fame and most of his income not to his academic, legal or government work, but to his writing. Soon after moving to London, he obtained remunerative work as a leader writer for the Morning Chronicle and the Daily News. He was also art critic for The Times and The Graphic for many years. He edited the Autobiography of B. R. Haydon (1853), the Autobiography and Correspondence of C. R. Leslie, R.A. (1860) and Pen Sketches from a Vanished Hand, selected from papers of Mortimer Collins, and wrote Life and Times of Sir Joshua Reynolds (1865). With his first contribution to Punch, on 19 October 1844, Taylor began a thirty-six year association with the weekly humour and satire magazine, which ended only with his death. During the 1840s he wrote on average three columns a month; in the 1850s and 1860s this output doubled. His biographer Craig Howes writes that Taylor's articles were generally humorous commentary or comic verses on politics, civic news, and the manners of the day. In 1874 he succeeded Charles William Shirley Brooks as editor.

Taylor also established himself as a playwright and eventually produced about 100 plays. Between 1844 and 1846, the Lyceum Theatre staged at least seven of his plays, including extravanzas written with Albert Smith or Charles Kenney, and his first major success, the 1846 farce To Parents and Guardians. The Morning Post said of that piece, "The writing is admirable throughout – neat, natural and epigrammatic". It was as a dramatist that Taylor made the most impression – his biographer in the Dictionary of National Biography (DNB) wrote that in writing plays Taylor found his true vocation. In thirty-five years he wrote more than seventy plays for the principal London theatres.

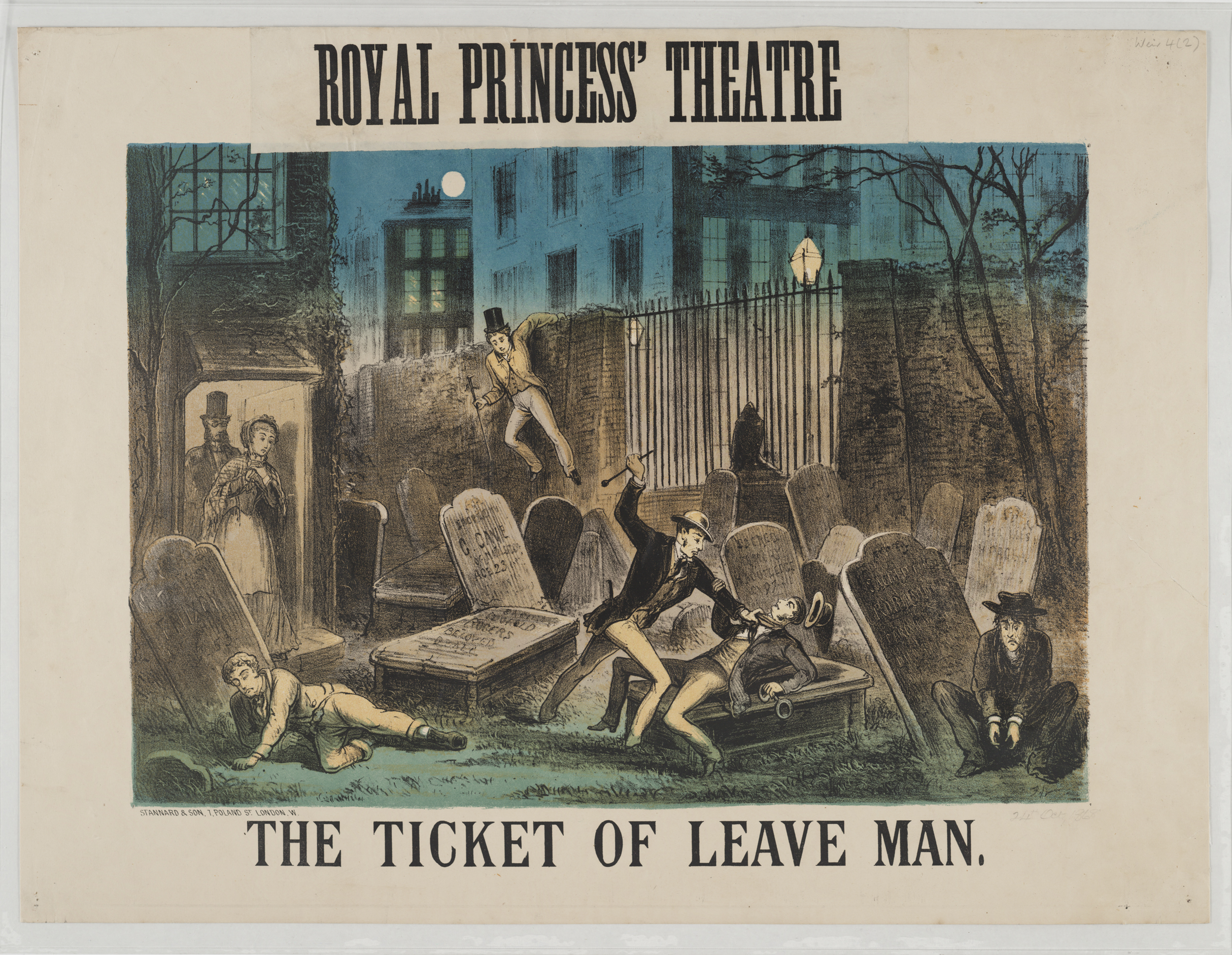
Poster for an 1868 revival of The Ticket-of-Leave Man

A substantial portion of Taylor's prolific output consisted of adaptations from the French or collaborations with other playwrights, notably Charles Reade. Some of his plots were adapted from the novels of Charles Dickens or others. Many of Taylor's plays were extremely popular, such as Masks and Faces, an extravaganza written in collaboration with Reade, produced at the Haymarket Theatre in November 1852. It was followed by the almost equally successful To Oblige Benson (Olympic Theatre, 1854), an adaptation from a French vaudeville. Others mentioned by the DNB are Plot and Passion (1853), Still Waters Run Deep (1855) and The Ticket-of-Leave Man (based on Le Retour de Melun by Édouard Brisebarre and Eugène Nus), a melodrama produced at the Olympic in 1863. Taylor also wrote a series of historical dramas (many in blank verse), including The Fool’s Revenge (1869), an adaption of Victor Hugo's Le roi s'amuse (also adapted by Verdi as Rigoletto), 'Twixt Axe and Crown (1870), Jeanne d'arc (1871), Lady Clancarty (1874) and Anne Boleyn (1875). The last of these, produced at the Haymarket in 1875, was Taylor's penultimate piece and only complete failure. In 1871 Taylor supplied the words to Arthur Sullivan's dramatic cantata, On Shore and Sea.

Like his colleague W. S. Gilbert, Taylor believed that plays should be readable as well as actable; he followed Gilbert in having copies of his plays printed for public sale. Both authors did so at some risk, because it made matters easy for American pirates of their works in the days before international copyright protection. Taylor wrote, "I have no wish to screen myself from literary criticism behind the plea that my plays were meant to be acted. It seems to me that every drama submitted to the judgment of audiences should be prepared to encounter that of readers".

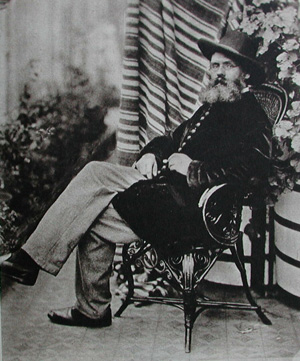
Taylor by Lewis Carroll, 1863

Many of Taylor's plays were extremely popular, and several survived into the 20th century, although most are largely forgotten today. His Our American Cousin (1858) is now remembered chiefly as the play Abraham Lincoln was attending when he was assassinated, but it was revived many times during the 19th century with great success. It became celebrated as a vehicle for the popular comic actor Edward Sothern, and after his death, his sons, Lytton and E. H. Sothern, took over the part in revivals.

=== Personal life ===
Howes records that Taylor was described as "of middle height, bearded [with] a pugilistic jaw and eyes which glittered like steel". Known for his remarkable energy, he was a keen swimmer and rower, who rose daily at five or six and wrote for three hours before taking an hour's brisk walk from his house in Wandsworth to his Whitehall office.

Some, like Ellen Terry, praised Taylor's kindness and generosity; others, including F. C. Burnand, found him obstinate and unforgiving. Terry wrote of Taylor in her memoirs:

Most people know that Tom Taylor was one of the leading playwrights of the 'sixties as well as the dramatic critic of The Times, editor of Punch, and a distinguished Civil Servant, but to us he was more than this. He was an institution! I simply cannot remember when I did not know him. It is the Tom Taylors of the world who give children on the stage their splendid education. We never had any education in the strict sense of the word yet through the Taylors and others, we were educated.

Terry's frequent stage partner, Henry Irving said that Taylor was an exception to the general rule that it was helpful, even though not essential, for a dramatist to be an actor to understand the techniques of stagecraft: "There is no dramatic author who more thoroughly understands his business".

In 1855 Taylor married the composer, musician and artist Laura Wilson Barker (1819–1905). She contributed music to at least one of his plays, an overture and entr'acte to Joan of Arc (1871), and harmonisations to his translation Ballads and Songs of Brittany (1865). There were two children: the artist John Wycliffe Taylor (1859–1925) and Laura Lucy Arnold Taylor (1863–1940). Taylor and his family lived at 84 Lavender Sweep, Battersea, where they held Sunday musical soirees. Celebrities who attended included Lewis Carroll, Charles Dickens, Henry Irving, Charles Reade, Alfred Tennyson, Ellen Terry and William Makepeace Thackeray.

Taylor died suddenly at his home in 1880 at the age of 62 and is buried in Brompton Cemetery. After his death, his widow retired to Coleshill, Buckinghamshire, where she died on 22 May 1905.

== Selected bibliography ==
- Valentine and Orson, 1844
- Whittington and his Cat, 1844
- Cinderella, 1844
- A Trip to Kissingen, 1844
- To Parents and Guardians, 1845
- Diogenes and his Lantern, 1849
- The Vicar of Wakefield, 1850
- The Philosopher's Stone, 1850
- Prince Dorus, 1850
- Our Clerks, 1852
- Wittikind and his Brothers, 1852
- Plot and Passion, 1853
- A Nice Firm, 1853
- The King's Rival, 1854
- Masks and Faces, 1854
- To Oblige Benson, 1854
- Two Loves and a Life, 1854
- Still Waters Run Deep, 1855
- Helping Hands, 1855
- Retribution, 1856
- Victims, 1857
- A Sheep in Wolf's Clothing, 1857
- An Unequal Match, 1857
- Our American Cousin, 1858
- Going to the Bad, 1858
- New Men and Old Acres, 1859
- A Tale of Two Cities, 1859
- Barefaced Impostors, 1859
- The Contested Election, 1859
- Nine Points of the Law, 1859
- The Overland Route, 1860
- Up at the Hills, 1860
- The Babes in the Wood, 1860
- The Ticket-of-leave Man, 1863
- Sense and Sensation, 1864
- Henry Dunbar, 1865
- The Sister's Penance, 1866
- The Fool's Revenge, 1869
- Mary Warner, 1869
- The Babes in the Wood, 1870
- Twixt Axe and Crown, 1870
- The Hidden Hand, 1870
- Joan of Arc, 1871
- Arkwright’s Wife, 1873
- Lady Clancarty, 1874
- Anne Boleyn, 1875
- Settling Day, 1877

Source: Dictionary of National Biography.

== Sources ==
- Richards, Jeffrey (2007). Sir Henry Irving. London: A C Black. ISBN 978-1-85285-591-8.
- Terry, Ellen (1982) [1900]. The Story of My Life. Woodbridge: Boydell. ISBN 978-0-85115-204-2.
