= Charles Reade =

British novelist and dramatist (1814–1884)

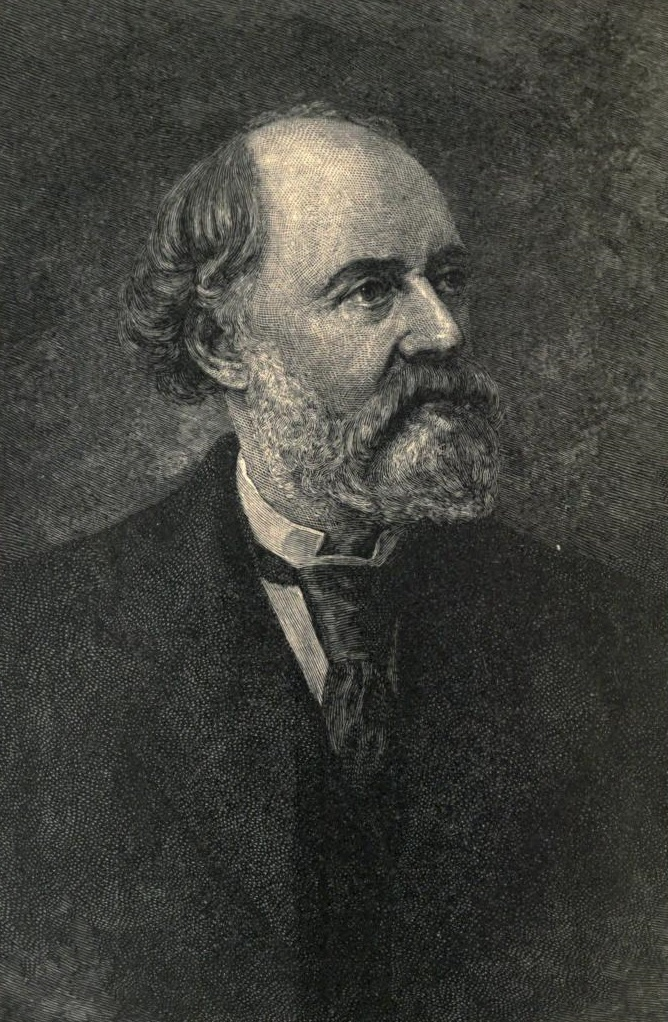
- Born: 8 June 1814; Ipsden, Oxfordshire, England
- Died: 11 April 1884 (aged 69)
- Resting place: Willesden, London, England
- Education: Magdalen College, Oxford (BA, BCL with a Vinerian Scholarship, DCL)
- Occupations: Novelist; dramatist
- Children: 1 adopted
- Parent(s): John Reade; Anne Marie Scott-Waring
- Relatives: Edward Anderton Reade (brother); William Winwood Reade (nephew); Lawrence Reade (nephew)

Charles Reade (8 June 1814 – 11 April 1884) was a British novelist and dramatist, best known for the 1861 historical novel The Cloister and the Hearth.

== Life ==
Charles Reade was born at Ipsden, Oxfordshire, to John Reade and Anne Marie Scott-Waring, and had at least four brothers including the civil servant Edward Anderton Reade. His nephews included the influential historian William Winwood Reade and the cricketer Lawrence Reade.

He studied at Magdalen College, Oxford, from which he received a BA in 1835, and a BCL with a Vinerian Scholarship in 1842, and a DCL in 1847. He became a fellow of his college, and a dean of arts and a vice-president of the University of Oxford.

His name was entered at Lincoln's Inn in 1836 and he was called to the bar in 1843.

== Writings ==
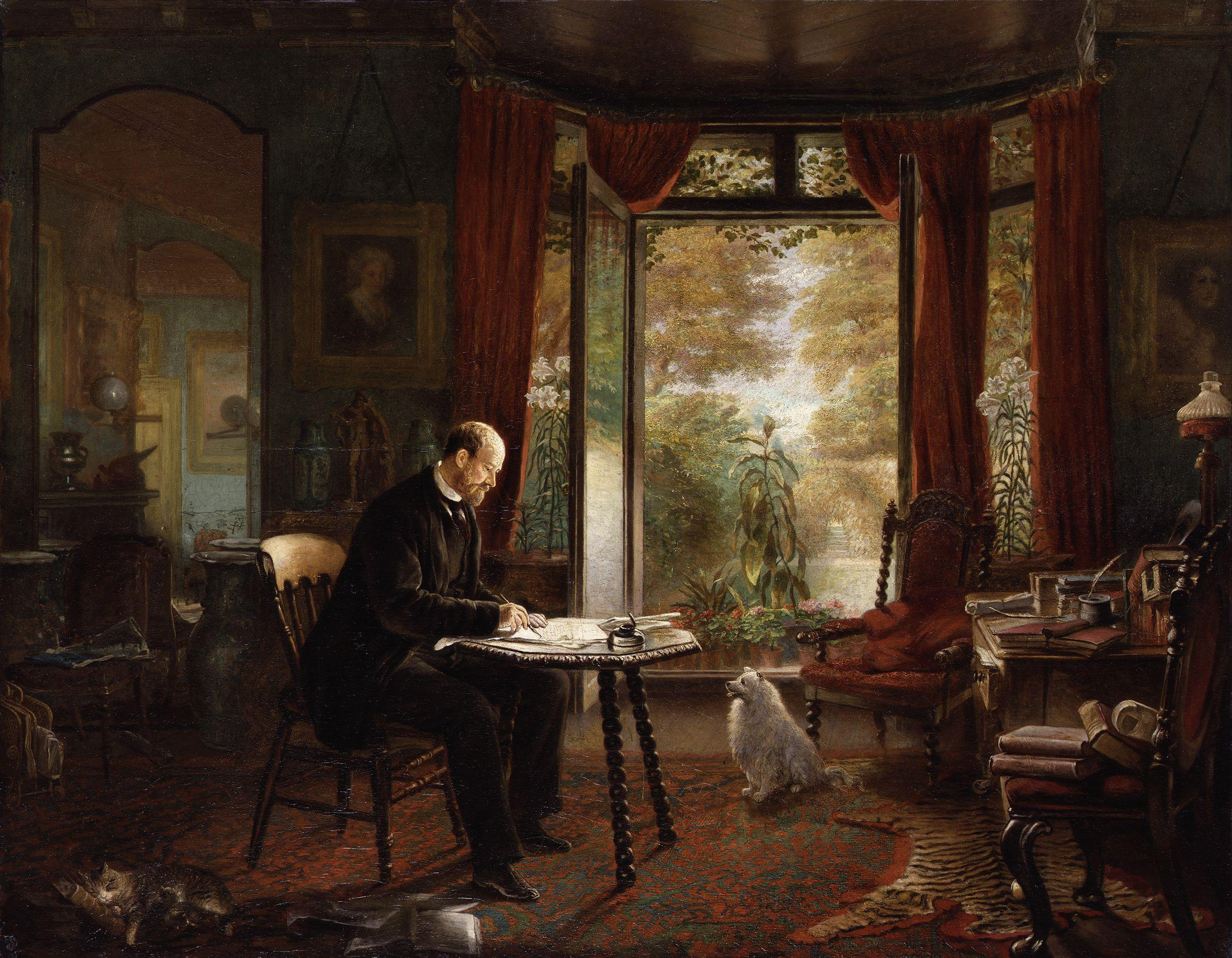
Charles Reade, portrait of him writing, by Charles Mercier, circa 1870

Reade began his literary career as a dramatist, and he chose to have "dramatist" stand first in the list of his occupations on his tombstone. As an author, he always had an eye to stage effect in scenes and situations as well as in dialogue. His first comedy, The Ladies' Battle, an adaptation of Eugène Scribe and Ernest Legouvé's play Bataille de Dames, appeared at the Olympic Theatre in May 1851. It was followed by Angela (1851), A Village Tale (1852), The Lost Husband (1852), and Gold (1853).

But Reade's reputation was made by the two-act comedy, Masks and Faces, in which he collaborated with Tom Taylor. It was produced in November 1852, and later was expanded into three acts. By the advice of the actress, Laura Seymour, he turned the play into a prose story which appeared in 1853 as Peg Woffington. The same year he wrote Christie Johnstone, a close study of Scottish fisher folk. In 1854 he produced, in conjunction with Tom Taylor, Two Loves and a Life, and The King's Rival, and, unaided, The Courier of Lyons (well known under its later title, The Lyons Mail) and his adaptation of Tobias Smollett's Peregrine Pickle. In the next year appeared Art (1855), afterwards known as Nance Oldfield.

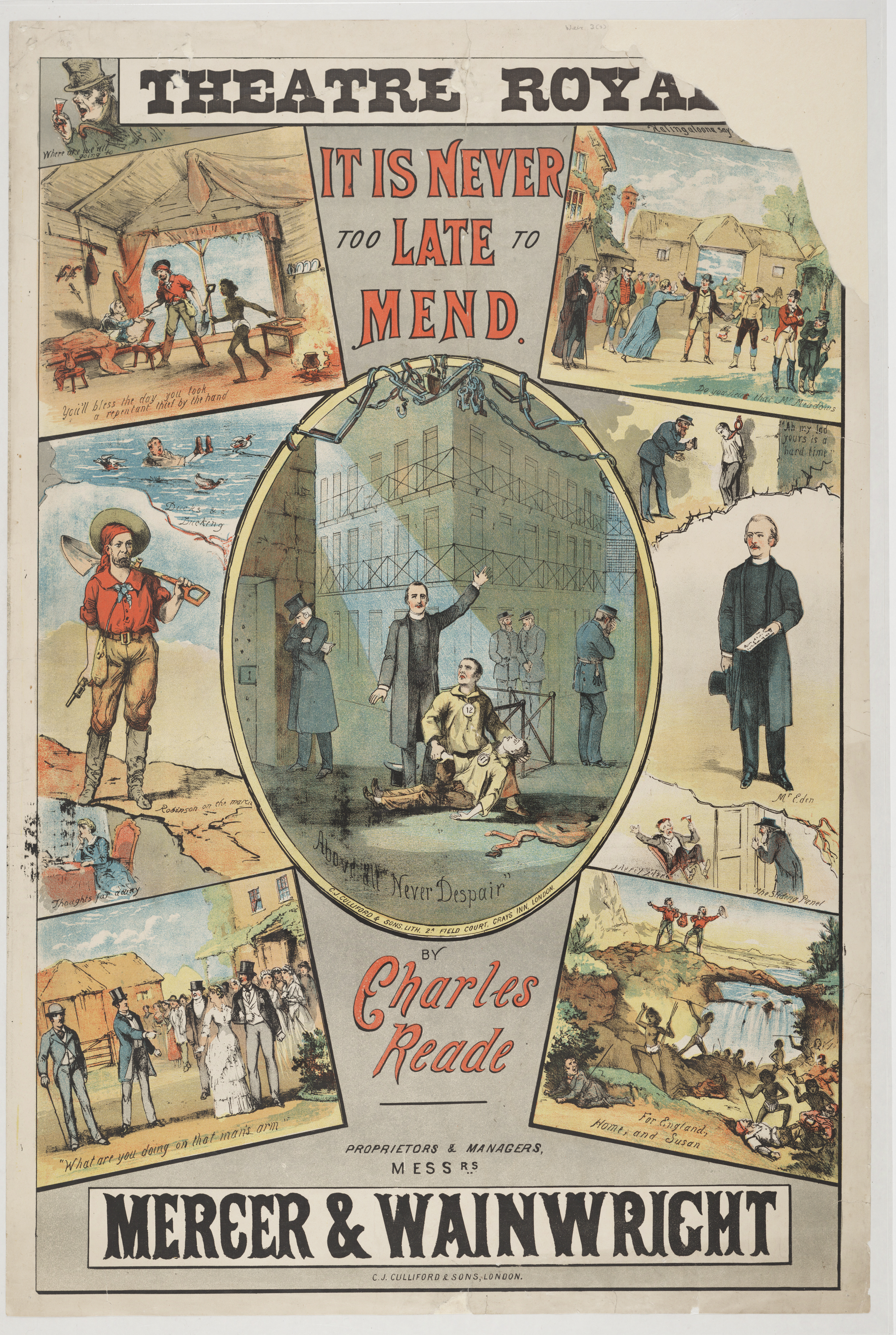
Theatre poster from It is never too late to mend

He made his name as a novelist in 1856, when he published It Is Never Too Late to Mend, a novel written to reform abuses in prison discipline and the treatment of criminals. The truth of some details was challenged, and Reade defended himself vigorously. Five more novels followed in quick succession: The Course of True Love Never Did Run Smooth (1857), White Lies (1857), Jack of all Trades (1858), The Autobiography of a Thief (1858), and Love Me Little, Love Me Long (1859). White Lies started as a translation of Auguste Maquet's play Le Château de Grantier. After managers declined the manuscript, Reade adapted the story, weaving it into a novel which was serialised in The London Journal and published in three volumes the same year. He produced an adaptation of this on stage as The Double Marriage in 1867.

In 1861 Reade published what would become his most famous work, based on a few lines by the medieval humanist Erasmus about the life of his parents. The novel began life as a serial in Once a Week in 1859 under the title "A Good Fight", but when Reade disagreed with the proprietors of the magazine over some of the contentious subject matter (principally the unmarried pregnancy of the heroine), he abruptly curtailed the serialisation with a false happy ending. Reade continued to work on the novel and published it in 1861, thoroughly revised and extended, as The Cloister and the Hearth. It became recognised as one of the most successful historical novels. Returning from the 15th century to contemporary English life, he next produced Hard Cash (originally published as Very Hard Cash) (1863), in which he highlighted the abuses of private lunatic asylums. Three more such novels followed: Foul Play (1868), in which he exposed the iniquities of ship-knackers, and paved the way for the labours of Samuel Plimsoll; Put Yourself in His Place (1870), in which he dealt with trade unions; and A Woman-Hater (1877), in which he continued his commentary on trade unions while also tackling the topic of women doctors. The Wandering Heir (1875), of which he also wrote a version for the stage, was suggested by the Tichborne Case.

Reade also published three elaborate studies of character: Griffith Gaunt (1866), A Terrible Temptation (1871), A Simpleton (1873). He rated the first of these as his best novel. At intervals throughout his literary career, he sought to gratify his dramatic ambition, hiring a theatre and engaging a company for the production of his plays. An example of his persistence was seen in the case of Foul Play. He wrote this in 1869 in combination with Dion Boucicault with a view to stage adaptation. The play was more or less a failure; but he produced another version alone in 1877, under the title of A Scuttled Ship, which was a notable failure. His greatest success as a dramatist attended his last attempt—Drink—an adaptation of Émile Zola's L'Assommoir, produced in 1879, and made into the film Drink in 1917.

In that year his friend Laura Seymour, who might have been his mistress and had kept house for him since 1854, died. Reade's health failed from that time. On his death, he left behind him a completed novel, A Perilous Secret, which showed he was still skilled in the arts of weaving a complicated plot and devising thrilling situations. Reade was an amateur of the violin, and among his works is an essay on Cremona violins with the title, "A Lost Art Revived." Reade is buried alongside Laura Seymour, in the churchyard of St. Mary's Church, Willesden, in north-west London.

Reade subtitled a number of his novels "A matter-of-fact romance"; this referred to his practice of basing his novels largely on newspaper cuttings, which he began collecting for this purpose in 1848. He also conducted his own research, observing prisons personally, for example, as well as borrowing at times heavily from other novelists' works. He admitted the public freely to the secrets of his method of composition: he spoke about his method in his prefaces, he introduced himself into one of his novels, as Dr Rolfe in A Terrible Temptation, and in his will, he left his workshop and his accumulation of materials open for inspection for two years after his death. The collection was extensive and well-organized, and he had planned to use it as a basis for an unrealized work in "the wisdom and folly of nations," dealing with social, political and domestic details.

Reade's novels were popular, and he was among England's highest-paid novelists. However, many libraries refused to carry his works on the grounds that they were indecent.

== Reputation ==
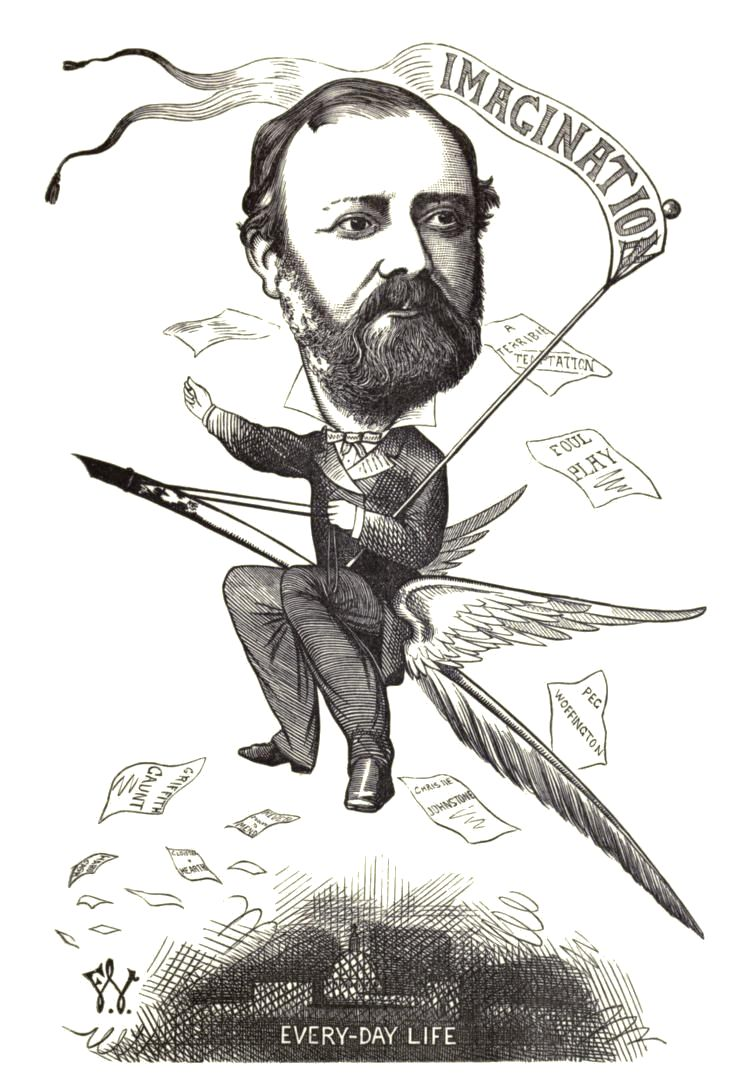
"Charles Reade," illustrated by Frederick Waddy (1872)

Reade fell out of fashion by the turn of the century—"it is unusual to meet anyone who has voluntarily read him," wrote George Orwell in an essay on Reade—but during the 19th century Reade was one of Britain's most popular novelists. He was not highly regarded by critics. The following assessment by Justin McCarthy, writing in 1872, is typical:

A strong, healthy air of honest and high purpose breathes through nearly all the stories. An utter absence of cant, affectation, and sham distinguishes them. A surprising variety of descriptive power, at once bold, broad, and realistic is one of their great merits. Mr. Reade can describe a sea-fight, a storm, the forging of a horseshoe, the ravages of an inundation, the trimming of a lady's dress, the tuning of a piano, with equal accuracy and apparent zest. . . . Mr. Reade wants no quality which is necessary to make a powerful story-teller, while he is distinguished from all mere story-tellers by the fact that he has some great social object to serve in nearly everything he undertakes to detail. More than this I do not believe he is, nor, despite the evidences of something yet higher which were given in 'Christie Johnstone' and 'The Cloister and the Hearth,' do I think he ever could have been. He is a magnificent specimen of the modern special correspondent, endowed with the additional and unique gift of a faculty for throwing his report into the form of a thrilling story. But it requires something more than this, something higher than this, to make a great novelist whom the world will always remember. Mr. Reade is unsurpassed in the second class of English novelists, but he does not belong to the front rank. His success has been great in its way, but it is for an age and not for time.

The author George Orwell summed up Reade's attraction as "the same charm as one finds in R. Austin Freeman's detective stories or Lieutenant-Commander Gould's collections of curiosities—the charm of useless knowledge," going on to say that

Reade was a man of what one might call penny-encyclopaedic learning. He possessed vast stocks of disconnected information which a lively narrative gift allowed him to cram into books which would at any rate pass as novels. If you have the sort of mind that takes a pleasure in dates, lists, catalogues, concrete details, descriptions of processes, junk-shop windows and back numbers of the Exchange and Mart, the sort of mind that likes knowing exactly how a medieval catapult worked or just what objects a prison cell of the eighteen-forties contained, then you can hardly help enjoying Reade.

During his career, the prolific Reade was involved in several literary feuds involving accusations of plagiarism. He strongly defended himself, but invoked standards on literary borrowing that are looser than those of today. Reade is frequently discussed in studies of evolving attitudes toward plagiarism.

Reade is credited with the quote: "Sow a thought, and you reap an act; Sow an act, and you reap a habit; Sow a habit, and you reap a character; Sow a character, and you reap a destiny". These days it is often adapted to:

"Mind your thoughts for they become your words; mind your words for they become your actions; mind your actions for they become your habits; mind your habits for they become your character; mind your character for it becomes your destiny."

(This was used in the film, The Iron Lady (2011), spoken by Meryl Streep playing Margaret Thatcher, the former Prime Minister.)

Reade's newspaper cuttings, notebooks and correspondence are held at The London Library.

== Marriage and family ==
Reade and his late wife had an adopted daughter. He cut off relations with her after she eloped at age sixteen with an actor. After her husband abandoned her, she worked as an actress for a number of years. She performed 2000 times in a production of Reade's It Is Never Too Late to Mend. She wound up destitute in a workhouse in Kent.

== Allusions ==
Ira Gershwin's lyric "It’s never too late to Mendelssohn...", which appears in both Oh, Kay! and Lady in the Dark, is a play on the title of Reade's book.

In Dickens and Daughter (1939), Gladys Storey repeats some literary reminiscences communicated to her by Kate Perugini, the daughter of Charles Dickens. She recalls "Kindly Charles Reade, who used to perch his expensive person upon a small circular-topped revolving piano-stool and sing comic songs in a tiny voice. He had a mistress who suffered the pains of rheumatism; when she died he caused her grave to be bricked in so that she might not feel the effects of the damp earth around her."

John Betjeman's poem "In Willesden Churchyard" includes a reference to "Laura Seymour's grave-/ 'So long the loyal counsellor and friend'/Of that Charles Reade whose coffin lies with hers/Was she his mistress?" followed by a long imagined passage about their possible relationship.

== Works ==
- Gold! (1853, play)
- Masks and Faces (1852, play)
- Peg Woffington (1853, novel)
- Christie Johnstone (1853, novel)
- The Courier of Lyons (1854, play. Also known as The Lyons Mail)
- Clouds and Sunshine and Arts (1855)
- It Is Never Too Late to Mend (1856, novel)
- The Course of True Love Never Did Run Smooth (1857)
- White Lies (1857, novel)
- The Box Tunnel (1857, short story. Only published in book form in America)
- Autobiography of a Thief (1858, novelette about a train robbery)
- Jack of All Trades. 1858. (novelette about the elephant Mademoiselle D'Jeck)
- Love Me Little, Love Me Long (1859, novel)
- A Good Fight and Other Tales (1859)
- The Eighth Commandment (1860)
- The Cloister and the Hearth (1861)
- Hard Cash (1863, novel)
- Griffith Gaunt; or, Jealousy (1866, novel)
- Foul Play (1868, novel)
- Put Yourself in His Place (1870, novel)
- A Terrible Temptation (1871, novel)
- Shilly-Shally (1872, unauthorized stage adaptation of Anthony Trollope's Ralph the Heir)
- A Simpleton (1873)
- The Wandering Heir (1873)
- Trade Malice (1875)
- A Woman-Hater (1877)
- Golden Crowns (1877)
- Drink (1879)
- The Lyons Mail (1877)
- Singleheart and Doubleface (1884, novel)
- A Perilous Secret (1884, novel)
