= John Phillips =

John Phillips or Philips may refer to:

== Academics ==
- John Edward Philips (born 1952), American historian
- John Phillips (educator) (1719–1795), American educator and founder of Phillips Exeter Academy
- John Phillips (lawyer), English law professor and head of King's College School of Law
- John Roland Phillips (1844–1887), Welsh lawyer and antiquarian
- Jock Phillips (born 1947), New Zealand historian, author and encyclopaedist

== Arts and entertainment ==
- John Phillips (fl. 1570–1591), English writer and poet
- John Phillips (author) (1631–1706), English author and secretary to John Milton
- John Philips (1676–1709), British poet
- John Phillips (artist) (1808–after 1842), English illustrator and portraitist
- John Sanborn Phillips (1861–1949), American writer and founder of McClure's Magazine
- John Phillips (actor) (1914–1995), British actor
- John Phillips (photographer) (1914–1996), Algerian-American photographer for Life magazine
- John P. Marquand (a.k.a. John Phillips, 1924–1995), American novelist
- John Phillips (musician) (1935–2001), American singer, songwriter and guitarist, member of The Mamas and the Papas

== Business and industry ==
- John Phillips (c. 1709–1775), English master carpenter
- John Leigh Philips (1761–1814), English textile manufacturer and collector of art
- John George Phillips (businessman) (1888–1964), American businessman, president of IBM
- Sir J. G. Phillips (1911–1986), Australian economist, governor of the Reserve Bank of Australia

== Politics and law ==
=== U.S. ===
- John Phillips (mayor) (1770–1823), American politician, first mayor of Boston
- John Phillips (Pennsylvania politician) (fl. 1821–1823), American congressman from Pennsylvania
- John Phillips (Wisconsin politician) (1823–1903), American physician and politician
- John Finis Philips (1834–1919), U.S. representative from Missouri
- John Calhoun Phillips (1870–1943), American politician, governor of Arizona
- John R. Phillips (American politician) (1887–1983), American congressman from California
- John R. Phillips (attorney) (born 1942), American diplomat and public interest attorney
- John Michael Phillips (born 1975), American lawyer, consumer and civil rights advocate and legal commentator
- John Alton Phillips (1905–1965), member of the Mississippi House of Representatives
- John Bunyan Phillips, member of the Oklahoma House of Representatives
- John L. Phillips Jr.(1924 or 1925–2008), American judge, businessman, and civil rights activist
- John Wesley Phillips (1803–1867), member of the Pennsylvania House of Representatives

=== Elsewhere ===
- Sir John Philipps, 1st Baronet (died 1629), Welsh landowner and politician
- John Phillips (Canadian politician) (1810–?), Canadian politician in New Brunswick
- John Phillips (Irish politician) (1839/40–1917), Irish member of parliament for South Longford
- John Harber Phillips (1933–2009), Australian barrister and chief justice of the Supreme Court of Victoria
- John David Phillips (born 1936), Australian lawyer and judge

== Religion ==
- John Phillips (bishop of Sodor and Man) (1555–1633), Welsh Anglican bishop
- John Phillips (priest) (1879–1947), Welsh schoolmaster, Dean of Monmouth
- John Phillips (Puritan), English minister in England and Massachusetts
- John Bertram Phillips (1906–1982), British Bible translator, writer and clergyman
- John Phillips (bishop of Portsmouth) (1910–1985), British Anglican bishop

== Science and medicine ==
- John Phillips (geologist) (1800–1874), English geologist
- John Arthur Phillips (1822–1887), British geologist, metallurgist and mining engineer
- Sir John Phillips (physician) (1855–1928), British physician
- John Charles Phillips (1876–1938), American hunter, zoologist, ornithologist and environmentalist
- J. F. V. Phillips (1899–1987), South African botanist and ecologist
- John Phillips (zoologist) (1933–1987), British zoologist, vice-chancellor of Loughborough University
- John L. Phillips (born 1951), American astronaut

== Sports ==
=== Cricket ===
- John Phillips (Guyanese cricketer) (1902–1967), Guyanese cricketer
- John Phillips (South African cricketer) (1910–1985), South African cricketer
- John Phillips (English cricketer) (1933–2017), English cricketer
- John Phillips (New Zealand cricketer) (1949–2017), New Zealand cricketer

=== Other sports ===
- John Phillips (snooker player) (1935–2008), Scottish snooker player
- John Phillips (basketball coach) (born 1947), American college basketball coach
- John Phillips (footballer) (1951–2017), English-born Welsh international goalkeeper
- John Phillips (fighter) (born 1985), Welsh mixed martial artist
- John Phillips (American football) (born 1987), American football tight end

== Others ==
- John Phillips (pirate) (died 1724), English captain of the pirate ship Revenge
- John Phillips (surveyor) (died 1897), British engineer and surveyor
- John Vassall (a.k.a. John Phillips, 1924–1996), British convicted spy
- John Aristotle Phillips (born 1955), American entrepreneur known as the "A-Bomb Kid"

== Other uses ==
- John Phillips (John, the Wolf King of L.A.), musical album by John Phillips of The Mamas and the Papas

== See also ==
- John Phillip (1817–1867), British painter
- John Phillip (poet) (fl. 1561), English poet and dramatist
- Jonathan Phillips (disambiguation)
- Jack Phillips (disambiguation)
- John Philip (disambiguation)
- John Philipps (disambiguation)
