= Carlotta Leclercq =

British actress

- Born: Margaret Charlotte Leclercq; June 12, 1832; Lambeth
- Died: August 9, 1893 (aged 61); Chelsea
- Occupation: Actress
- Years active: 1853–1879

Carlotta Leclercq (12 June 1832 –9 August 1893) was a British actress.

== Career ==
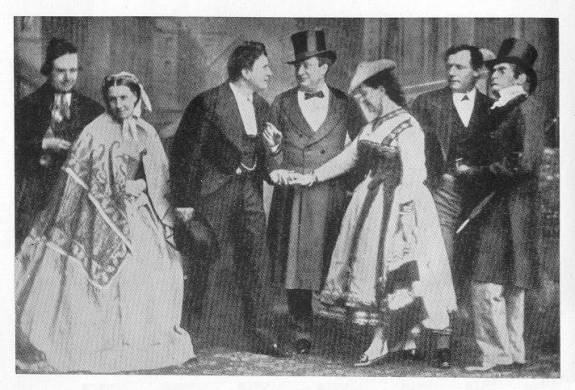
No Thoroughfare by Charles Dickens and Wilkie Collins. Left to right: Benjamin Webster, Mrs. Alfred Mellon, Henry G. Neville, Charles Albert Fechter, Carlotta Leclercq, John Billington, and George G. Belmore.

Leclercq was born as Margaret Charlotte Leclercq in Lambeth, then part of Surrey on 12 June 1832. Her baptism is recorded as having taken place on 3 April 1833, in Liverpool. She was one of the children of Charles Clark (1797–1861) and his wife, Margaret, née Burnet. Clark was a pantomimist and ballet master, who performed under the stage name of Charles Leclercq. All of her brothers and sisters were actors: Rose, Louise, Charles Jr., Arthur and Pierre Leclercq.

Leclercq's debut was at the Princess Theatre when she was a child. In 1853 she performed as Maddalina in Marco Spada, followed by Marguerite in Faust and Marguerite. She also performed in the Muleteer of Toledo, The Tempest, The Merchant of Venice, The Merry Wives of Windsor and Titania in A Midsummer Night's Dream.

Leclerq was the first to play Diana in Don't Judge by Appearances, Brougham's Playing with Fire, Zillah in Duke's Motto, Madame de Pompadour in King's Butterfly, and Lucy Ashton in Master of Ravenswood. She performed at the Adelphi Theatre, starring as Mercedes Monte Christo and as Marguerite in No Thoroughfare in 1868 and as Emily Milburn in Black and White. She left England and went to the United States with Charles Fechter. In 1877, she returned to England and married the actor John Nelson in York (the marriage entry gives her name as Margaret Carlotta Leclercq). The two performed together until his death, two years later. She stopped performing after 1879 in London although she made occasional appearances in the provinces.

Leclerq became known as a teacher of theatre skills. She died on 9 August 1893 at her home in Chelsea.
