= John George Phillips =

John George Phillips is the name of:

- John George Phillips (businessman) (1888–1964), American businessman who was president of IBM
- Jack Phillips (wireless operator) (1887–1912), senior wireless operator aboard the Titanic

== See also ==
- Jack Phillips (disambiguation)
- John Phillips (disambiguation)
