= Horace Wigan =

Actor, dramatist and theatre manager

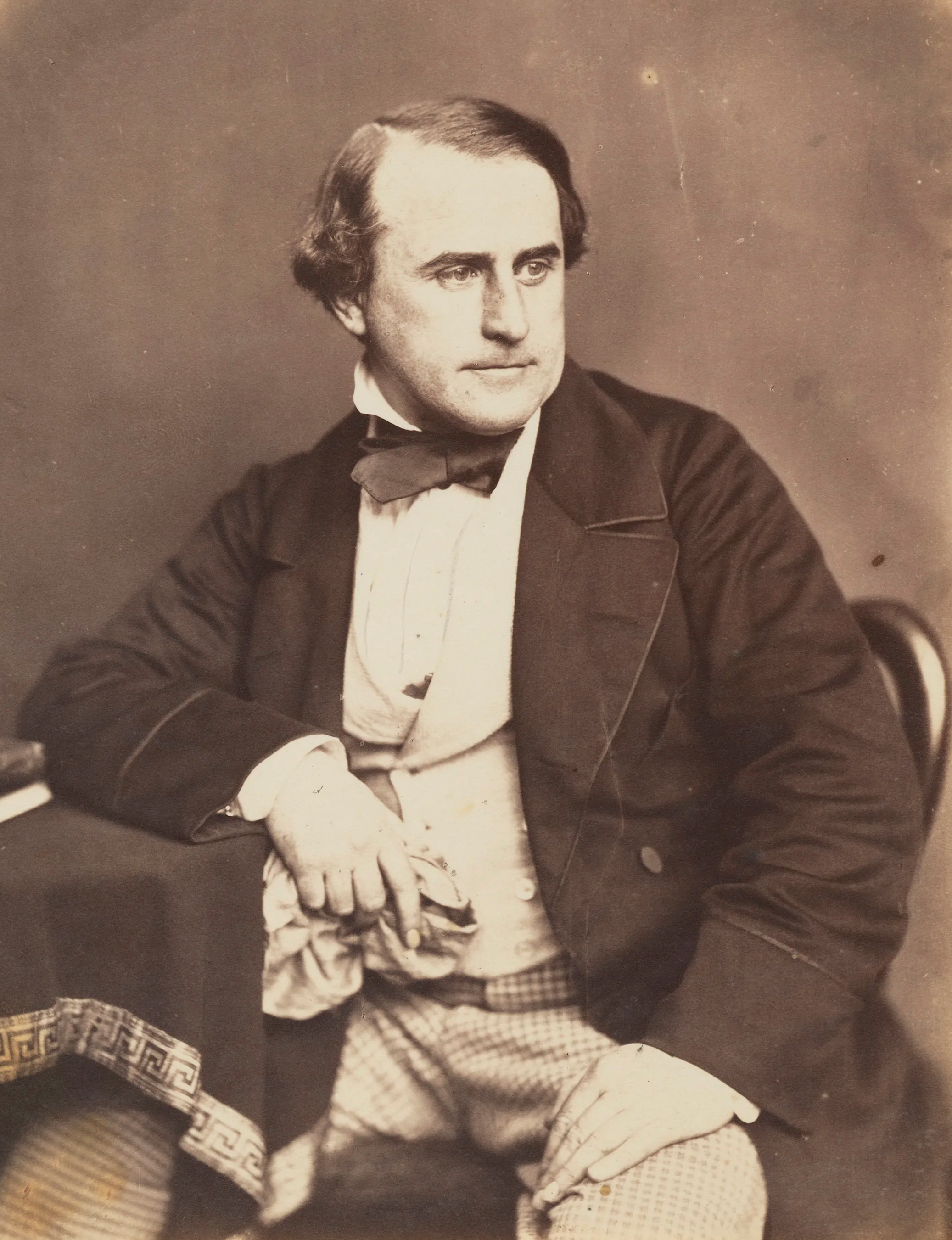
Portrait by Herbert Watkins, c. 1857

Horace Wigan (1815/16 – 7 August 1885) was an actor, dramatist and theatre manager. He was the original Hawkshaw, the detective in the play The Ticket-of-Leave Man by Tom Taylor.

== Early career ==
He was born in Blackheath, London, son of James Wigan, a teacher of languages and at one time Secretary of the Dramatic Authors' Society; he was younger brother of the actor-manager Alfred Wigan. He was first seen on stage in Dublin on 1 August 1853, in Sweethearts and Wives by James Kenney. His first London appearance was at the Olympic Theatre from 1 May 1854, in The Happy Man by Lever.

Wigan first attracted attention in 1858 when he opened on 4 December 1858 in the original production of The Porter's Knot by John Oxenford, playing Smoothly Smirk. From 11 April 1859 he was in the original production of Nine Points of the Law by Tom Taylor, playing Mr. Cunninghame. He played The Baron de Beaupré in John Maddison Morton's A Husband to Order from 17 October 1859, and William Hogarth in Tom Taylor's The Christmas Dinner, opening on 23 April 1860. All these productions were at the Olympic Theatre.

== 1860s ==
From 27 March 1863 he was the original Hawkshaw, a detective, in The Ticket-of-Leave Man by Taylor, his first distinct acting success. In 1864 he became manager of the Olympic Theatre. In London he had appeared only at this theatre. He opened on 2 November with three new plays: Tom Taylor's The Hidden Hand, and two farces, John Oxenford's The Girl I Left Behind Me and John Maddison Morton's My Wife's Bonnet, all of them adaptations from the French.

In Tom Taylor's Settling Day, opening on 4 March 1865, he was the first Meiklam. In a revival of Twelfth Night he was Sir Andrew Aguecheek. From 30 June 1865 in Tom Taylor's The Serf, or Love Levels All, he was Khor, an old serf. From about 1866 the Olympic Theatre was managed by Benjamin Nottingham Webster. From 7 November 1868 he played Inspector Javert in the first production of The Yellow Passport by Henry Gartside Neville, an adaptation of Les Misérables by Victor Hugo. He appeared in A Life Chase, an adaptation by himself and John Oxenford of Le Drame de la Rue de la Paix, at the Gaiety Theatre opening on 11 October 1869.

== Mirror Theatre ==
From 1870 Wigan appeared in various theatres in London, playing comedy roles. On 24 April 1875 he opened, as manager, the Theatre Royal, Holborn, renamed the Mirror, with a revival of The Hidden Hand, A. Maltby's Make Yourself at Home, and James Kenney's Maids of Honour. He was, from 29 May, the first Inspector Walker in The Detective (Le Parricide), adapted by Clement Scott and E. Manuel. In the following year the theatre passed into other hands and was renamed The Duke's Theatre; it was burnt down in 1880.

He died on 7 August 1885 in Sidcup in south-east London, at the house of his son-in-law.

== Acting style and writing ==
Wigan was a quiet, stolid, undemonstrative actor, most successful in detective parts which called for no display of emotion.

He wrote several farces. His most successful play was Friends or Foes, adapted from Nos Intimes by the French dramatist Victorien Sardou, first produced at the Olympic Theatre on 8 March 1862.
