= Charles Fechter =

Anglo-French actor (1824–1879)

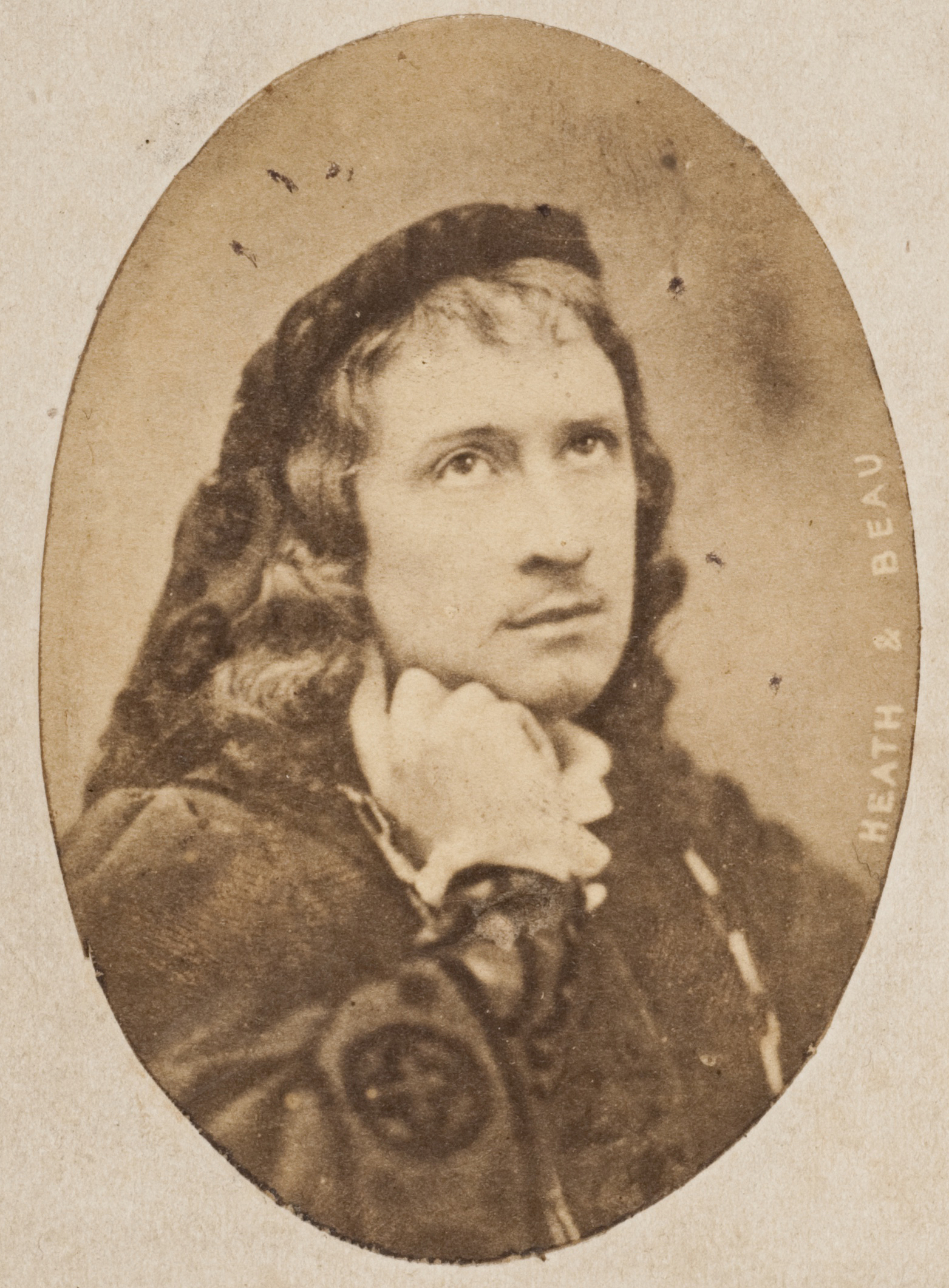
- Portrait of Charles Albert Fechter, 1861-62
- Born: Charles Albert Fechter; 23 October 1824; London, UK
- Died: 5 September 1879 (aged 54); Quakertown, Pennsylvania, US
- Resting place: Mount Vernon Cemetery (Philadelphia)

Charles Albert Fechter (23 October 1824 – 5 August 1879) was an Anglo-French actor. He began his career at the Comédie-Française before establishing himself in Paris, where his creation of Armand Duval in La Dame aux camélias was a major success, and he later managed the Odéon. After moving to London, he achieved an extraordinary triumph as Hamlet at the Princess's Theatre in 1861 and went on to lease the Lyceum Theatre. He subsequently worked in the United States from 1870 until his death in 1879.

== Biography ==
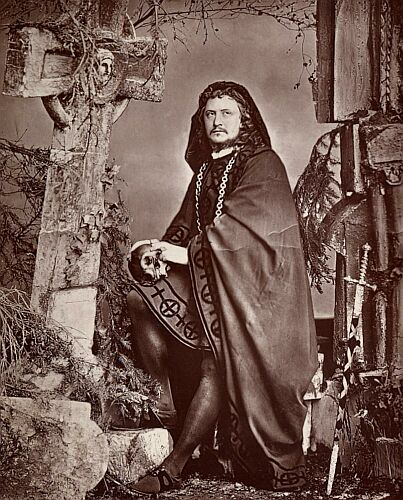
Charles Fechter as Hamlet, 1872.

Fechter was born, probably in London, of French parents, although his mother was of Piedmontese and his father of German extraction.

As a boy he had ambitions to be a sculptor but discovered his talent while appearing in some private theatricals. In 1841 he joined a travelling company that was going to Italy. The tour was a failure, and the company broke up; Fechter returned home and resumed the study of sculpture. At the same time he attended classes at the Conservatoire with the view of gaining admission to the Comédie-Française. Late in 1844 he won the grand medal of the Académie des Beaux-Arts with a piece of sculpture, and made his debut at the Comédie-Française as Seide in Voltaire's Mahomet and Valère in Molière's Tartuffe. He acquitted himself with credit; but, tired of the small parts he found himself condemned to play, returned again to his sculptor's studio in 1846.

In the same year he was invited to appear with a French company in Berlin, where he made his first decisive success as an actor. On his return to Paris in the following year he married the actress Eléonore Rabut (d. 1895). Previously he had appeared for some months in London, in a season of French classical plays given at the St James's Theatre. In Paris for the next ten years he fulfilled a series of successful engagements at various theatres, his chief triumph being his creation at the Vaudeville on 2 February 1852 of the part of Armand Duval in La Dame aux camélias. For nearly two years (1857–1858) Fechter was manager of the Odéon, where he produced Tartuffe and other classical plays.

Having received tempting offers to act in English at the Princess's Theatre, London, he made a diligent study of the English language, and appeared there on 27 October 1860 in an English version of Victor Hugo's Ruy Blas. This was followed by The Corsican Brothers and Don César de Bazan; and on 20 March 1861, he attempted Hamlet for the first time. The result was an extraordinary triumph, the play running for 115 nights. This was followed by Othello, in which he played alternately the Moor and Iago. In 1863 he leased the Lyceum Theatre, where he opened with The Duke's Motto; this was followed by The King's Butterfly, The Mountebank (in which his son Paul, a boy of seven, appeared), The Roadside Inn, The Master of Ravenswood, The Corsican Brothers (in the original French version, in which he had created the parts of Louis and Fabian dei Franchi) and The Lady of Lyons.

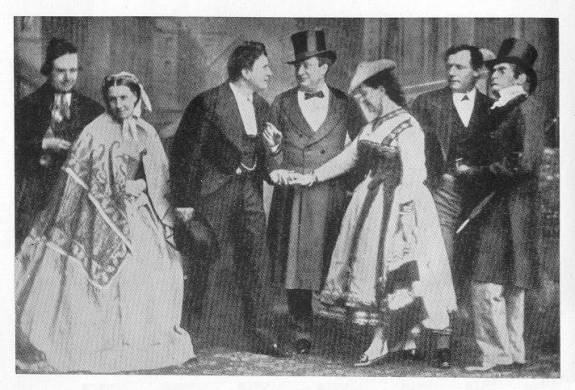
No Thoroughfare by Charles Dickens and Wilkie Collins. Left to right: Benjamin Webster, Mrs. Alfred Mellon, Henry Neville, Charles Fechter, Carlotta Leclercq, John Billington, and George G. Belmore.

After this he appeared at the Adelphi Theatre (1868) as Obenreizer in No Thoroughfare, by Charles Dickens and Wilkie Collins, as Edmond Dantes in The Count of Monte Cristo, and as Count de Leyrac in Black and White, a play in which the actor himself collaborated with Wilkie Collins.

In 1870 he visited the United States, where (with the exception of a visit to London in 1872) he remained till his death. He played in the United States between 1870 and 1876 in most of the parts in which he had won his chief triumphs in Britain. His first appearance in New York was at Niblo's Garden in the title role of Hugo's Ruy Blas in January 1870. He leased the Globe Theatre at 730 Broadway in September 1870. The experiment was brief. Fechter's imperious temper, aggravated by indulgence in drink, involved him in private quarrels and in discussions in the press, and he left in January 1871. He then had the same experiences at the old French theatre, renamed the Lyceum Theatre that year, and also in Boston.

He then went into a brief partnership with William Stuart at the newly completed New Park Theatre in April 1874. It had been built by Stuart and Dion Boucicault, who pulled out just before the opening. Fechter acted in his own Love's Penance, an adaptation of Le médecin des enfants by le Comte d'Avrigny. The play flopped, and Fechter retired to a farm which he had bought in the little village of Richland Centre, Bucks County, near Quakertown. The last three years of his life were spent in seclusion with his second wife, Lizzie Price, and his dogs on the farm, where he died. He was interred at Mount Vernon Cemetery in Philadelphia.

A bust of the actor by himself is in the Garrick Club, London.

== Family life ==
He married, 29 November 1847, Mlle Charlotte Eléonore Rabut (1819-1894), a pensionnaire of the Comédie Française, Paris, by whom he had a son, Paul, and a daughter, Marie, who became an operatic singer. From 1850 to April 1855, he had a love affair with the famous actress Pauline Virginie Déjazet (1798-1875).
