= Maud's Peril =

1867 play by Watts Phillips

Maud's Peril in an 1867 play by Watts Phillips. It debuted in London at the Adelphi Theatre on 23 October 1867, and at Wallack's Theatre in New York City on 25 November 1867. The play is based in part on Le Forcat by Charles de Bernard.

== Reception ==
The New York papers did not give good reviews of the play, and it only played for a few weeks. The New York Herald called it "improbable and absurd in its plot, without any merit in its language, it belongs to the lowest order of sensational plays, and is altogether unworthy of the fine company by whom it is performed." But when Phillips' published the play in England he dedicated it "with feelings of deep disgust to the thief or thieves who ... caused a mutilated copy of the work to be circulated in America, to the detriment of its author." He also asserted that "nearly one-third of the Piece being omitted, and the remainder garbled into nonsense by introductions of the plunderer's own." Phillips' dismay was no doubt a result of the lax United States copyright laws of the time, which permitted widespread piracy of foreign works.

The London production lasted for 54 performances. Its reviews were also not very positive, though the Observer said it was "perhaps the best of Mr. Phillips's dramas."

== Original cast ==
=== London, Adelphi Theatre (23 October 1867) ===
- Sir Ralph Challoner by John Billington
- Gerald Gwynne by Mr. Ashley
- Toby Taperloy by Mr. G. Belmore
- Burrell by Mr. C.J. Smith
- Doctor by Mr. W.H. Eburne
- Lady Challoner by Ruth Herbert
- Kate Sefton by Miss Amy Sheridan
- Susan Taperloy by Adeline Billington

=== New York, Wallack's Theatre ===
- Sir Ralph Challoner by James H. Stoddard
- Gerald Gwynne by Benjamin T. Ringgold
- Toby Taperloy by James William Wallack, Jr.
- Burrell by George F. Browne
- Doctor by W.H. Pope
- Lady Challoner by Rose Eytinge
- Kate Sefton by Mary Barrett
- Susan Taperloy by Mrs. John Sefton
