= John Millington =

John Millington may refer to:

- John Millington (professor) (1779–1868), professor of mechanics at the Royal Institution, 1817–1829
- John Millington (rugby league) (born 1949), English rugby league footballer who played in the 1970s and 1980s
- John Millington Synge, Irish playwright and poet
- John Millington (pub), a public house in Greater Manchester, England

== See also ==
- John Billington (disambiguation)
- Millington (surname)
