= John Billington (disambiguation) =

John Billington (c. 1580–1630) was an Englishman who travelled to the New World on the Mayflower

John Billington may also refer to:

- John Billington (executioner) (1880–1905), English executioner
- John Billington (actor) (1828–1904), English actor

== See also ==
- Billington (surname)
- Billinton
