= John Philip =

John Philip may refer to:

- John Phillip (poet) (before 1540—after 1590), English dramatist
- John Philip (missionary) (1775–1851), Scottish advocate for indigenous rights in South Africa
- John Woodward "Jack" Philip (1840–1900), American admiral
- John R. Philip (1927–1999) Australian soil physicist

== See also ==
- John Phillip (1817–1867), Scottish painter
- John Phillips (disambiguation)
