= Giles Firman Phillips =

English painter (1780–1867)

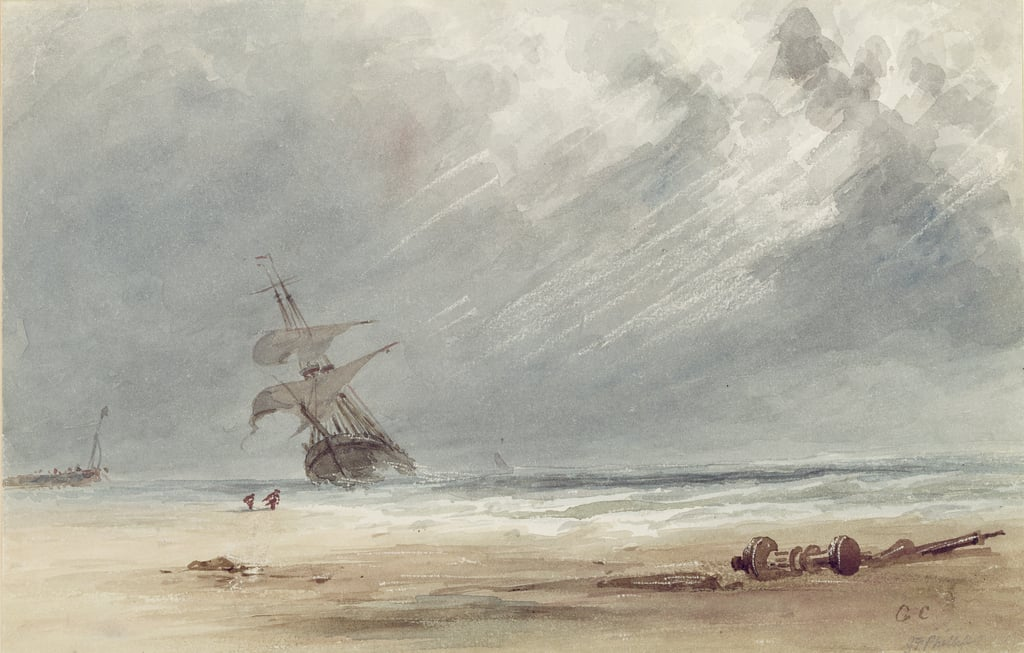
- Storm Over a Coast
- Born: 1780
- Died: 3 March 1867 (aged 86–87); Islington

Giles Firmin Phillips (1780–1867) was an English artist and author. He painted landscapes and river scenes, primarily of the river Thames. His paintings were exhibited, among other venues, at the Royal Academy from 1836 - 1858. He is the author of several books on painting and lithography.

== Biography ==
Phillips was born in 1780, the youngest child of John and Dorothy Phillips (sometimes spelled Philips). Nothing is known about Giles’ childhood and adolescence. He was not taught at the Royal Academy Schools. However, he was apprenticed by his father to James Harrison (later Harrison & Co.,) of Paternoster Row, Printer, on 1 April 1794, which was registered with the Stationers Company on 30 March. Harrison published engravings, lithographs and magazines, and Giles must have learned to draw by copying and engraving plates. He published a book on Lithography or 'drawing on stone' in 1828. Ref: [Britain, County Apprentices 1710-1808.Original Record at Stationers Company Archives, London.]

The first record of his artistic inclination is his engraving of Lady Eliza Wrixon-Becher, a celebrated actress of the time, which was published by A. Beugo in 1815 when Giles was 35 years old. Another engraving, this time of Sarah Siddons, was published, also by A. Beugo, in 1825. During the latter years Giles was moving fairly frequently. There are records of his insurance policies, taken out with the Sun Fire Office in the early 1820s which show him living at 4, Craven Street, City Road in 1822 and 35, Tavistock Street, Covent Garden by 1825, and described as an engraver. By 1827 he was living at 16 Brownlow Street, off High Holborn, and he is described as a “Drawing Master” in the directories of the time. His son John was also living with the family at the time.

He was a founder member of the New Watercolour Society (founded 1831, and renamed "The Institute of Painters in Watercolours" in 1863.) He joined in 1832 soon after its foundation, and was on the committee of Management in 1833, for a year. He was also a professional subscriber in 1834, but according to the catalogues was neither a member nor exhibitor after 1835. He was described as an eccentric old watercolour painter, well known in his day.

Phillips married Lydia Arnold on 11 June 1800. They are the parents of author/illustrator John Phillips. Giles Phillips was also the great-uncle of illustrator, author and playwright Watts Phillips.

According to his death certificate, Phillips died on 31 March 1867 in Islington. He was buried at the Holy Trinity Church, East Finchley.

== Published books ==
Giles Phillips wrote five books, one on Lithography, and four on the Techniques of Painting, which were published between 1828 and 1840.

The Art of Drawing on Stone in which is fully explained the process of chalk drawing, of pen and ink drawing, and of the dabbing system, together with the preparation of ink and chalks. By G.F. Phillips. Lith. London; printed for R.H. Laurie, Map, Chart and Print Seller, 53, Fleet Street, 1828. J. Rider, Printer, Little Britain.

Principles of Effect and Colour as Applicable to Landscape Painting Illustrated by examples for the amateur and professional student in Art Darton & Clark, Holborn Hill, 1834.

Review in "The Athaneum" No. 321, Saturday 21 December 1833, page 870.
"It is impossible to describe this work: the prose instructions are illustrated by examples from the pencil and both seem judicious. All who desire to understand landscape as well as those who wish to paint should consult this work. We have not Burnet's* work at hand, otherwise we might have been tempted to compare the opinions and directions of the two artists. Phillips is clear and simple: Burnet, as far as we recollect, is equally clear and simple but more scientific."

The Theory and Practice of Painting in Watercolours, as connected with the study of Landscape, by G.F. Phillips, author of 'Principles of Effect and Colour.......' Published by Charles Tilt, 86, Fleet Street, 1838. (The introduction gives his address as Park Street, Greenwich.) This is the 3rd Edition. First edition. 34pp + advert leaf. 4 hand coloured and 10 sepia aquatint plates. Abbey Life 165. Advertised in "The Athanaeum" March 1838

A Practical Treatise on Drawing, and on Painting in Watercolours, with illustrative examples in pencil in sepia, and in watercolours Published by A.H. Baily & Co. 1839.

The Art of Painting and Drawing simplified in a series of examples of Parts of the Human Figure with the most approved method of Miniature Painting to which is annexed the Art of Flower Painting. A.H. Baily & Co. Cornhill, 1840.

== Pictures and drawings in public collections ==
Victoria & Albert Museum

1. A Coast Scene, Sunset 3 x 6.25 inches. Ref: 104-1892
2. A River Scene 4.375 x 8.375 inches. Ref: 105-1892
3. Landscape, undulating country, cattle in the foreground, the sea in the distance signed G.F. Phillips: 9.375 x 16 inches. Ref. 1362-1925. Gift of A.W. Wallington.

Yale Centre for British Art

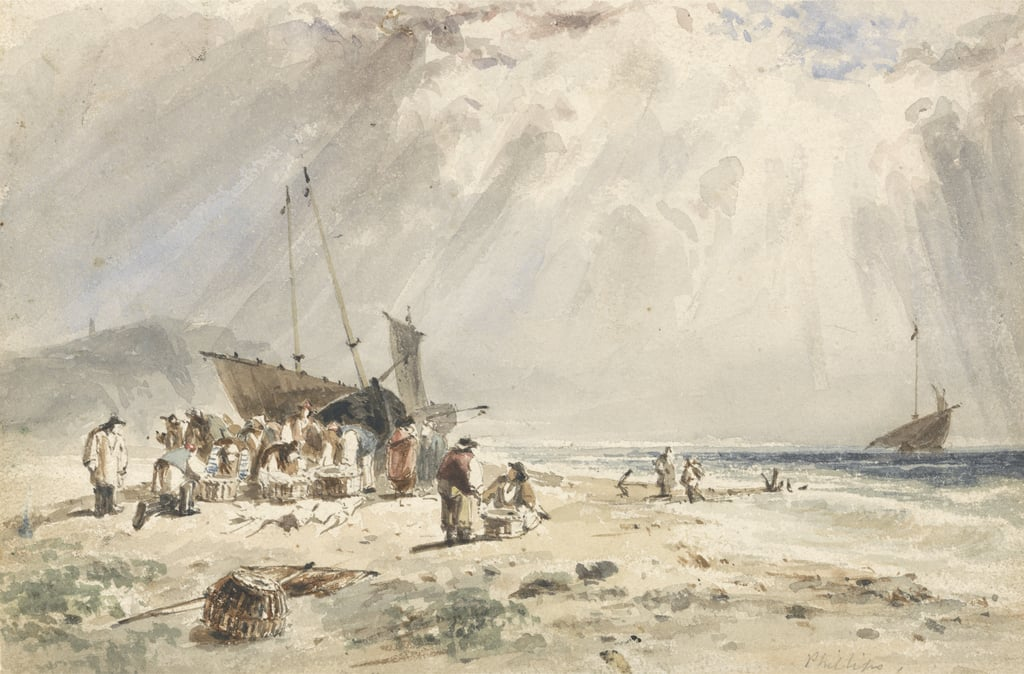
Fishmarket on the Beach

1. Fish Market on the Beach. Watercolour.* 5.5 x 8.275 inches. Ref B 1977.14.5828
2. A Storm over a Coast Watercolour. 6 x 9.5 inches B 1975.3.906

Anglesey Abbey Cambridgeshire. Fairhaven Collection.

1. Windsor from the Northwest Watercolour. 5 x 7.5 inches.

British Museum

1. Portrait of Sarah Siddons, originally a miniature, stipple engraving 3.75 x 3.25 inches.
2. Portrait of Lady Eliza Wrixon-Becher, (formerly the actress Eliza O'Neill,) 1791-1872. shown in an octagonal frame with a medallion of Shakespeare above. An original stipple engraving by Giles Firman Phillips, published by A. Beugo, 1815.

Guildhall Library

1. Fore Street, Lambeth Litho. 10"/8.625" x 6.25"/6.125". [Ref Pr L1/ALB] Printed by C. Motte. Published by J. Kendrick, 54 Leicester Square, (circa 1830)
2. Old Buildings at Lambeth Litho. Image 7" x 6.125". [Ref Pr1 L1/ALB] Printed at C. Motte's Lithog. (circa 1840) [Also at the GLC Printroom.]
3. The Knight's Bridge at Knightsbridge Coloured Litho. Printed by C. Motte, 23 Leicester Square. (circa 1825) 6" x 8.5".

National Portrait Gallery Leslie Grove Jones by Giles Firmin Phillips, after Abraham Wivell; Stipple engraving 1832; 6 1/2 in. x 4 1/8 in. (164 mm x 106 mm); Archive Collection

University of Liverpool Collection Near Whalley, Lancashire. Oil on Panel. 49 x 70 cm

== Book Illustrations ==
Two of his pictures, one of Barnes and one of Kew Gardens, were engraved by R. Winkles and used as illustrations for 'A New and Complete History of the Counties of Surrey and Sussex' by Thomas Allen.

== Exhibitions ==
Society of British Artists Phillips exhibited 50 works there between 1831 and 1848, which is confirmed by the surviving catalogues. The Society had been founded in 1824, and its exhibitions were held at 6, Suffolk Street, ( a gallery built by John Nash in 1823.)

1831 - Twilight

1832/3 - Coast Scene; Twilight

1833 - View at Northfleet

1833/4 - The Devils Punchbowl on the Portsmouth Road; The Thames from Putney Bridge, Evening

1834 - River Scene, Showery Weather; Coast Scene with Fishermen; Lilley Church, Herts; Coast Scene; Scene on the River Lea; Lane Scene near Hampstead

1834/5 - The Thames with the Tower Wharf; Coast Scene, Sunset; Coast Scene, Morning

1835 - View from Greenwich Park, Evening; Fishing Boats in a Calm; View from the Coast, Morning; View on the Thames, Greenwich, from the footpath leading to Woolwich; Blackwall Reach(oil); Sunset on the Coast; River Scene; Park Scene, Evening, After a Shower; The Thames from Crawleys Wharf, Greenwich (oil); The Village of Barnes, Evening, After a Shower; Dover Castle, Town and Pier; View near Ventnor, Isle of Wight; View in Greenwich Park(oil); Coast of Margate, Hard Blowing Weather; River Scene, Autumnal Morning (oil)

1839 - View on the Forth Near Stirling, Hazy Morning (oil); Moonrise (oil); View from Stirling Castle with Tourists, the Ochil Hills in the Distance (oil); Lane Scene Evening; Scene on the River Medway, Near Rochester, Kent

1840 - The Silver Stream in the Grounds of Sir Robert Frankland Russel, Chequers Court, Wendover(oil); Sandgate with Dungeness Bay, Lyn Castle, and Romney Marsh in the Distance(oil); Greenwich Park, Twilight; View of Edinburgh from Salisbury Craggs (oil); View on the Thames with Fishing Boats, The Isle of Sheppey in the Distance (oil); Landscape with Cattle, Evening (oil); Coast Scene, Squally Weather

1842 - Westwater Bay with the Town of Folkestone (oil); Heath Scene with Cattle, Showery Weather(oil); Llanberis Lake with Dolbadern Tower, Evening (oil); View on the Thames at Greenwich, Autumn at Morning (oil)

1845 - Coast Scene with Fishing Boats (oil); Hag Boats on the Shore, a Heavy Sea Breaking on the Beach (oil)

1848 - Mountain Pass with Cattle (oil)

British Institution. Shakespeare Gallery, 52, Pall Mall, founded 1806 and exhibitions held there until 1866. The British Institution held 2 exhibitions each year, the 'Winter' exhibition being devoted to British Artists. Between 1808 and 1842 'Premiums' or prizes were awarded to exhibitors. Phillips exhibited there from 1830 - 1846.

1830 - Stacking Hay

1836 - Coast Scene Sunset, Fishermen on the lookout

1837 - Coast Scene with Fishing Boats, Hard blowing Weather

1838 - Sea Piece

1841 - Coast Scene with Fishing Boats, The Tide Coming in with a Heavy Swell

1843 - View on the Thames with Fishing Boats (oil), The Isle of Sheppey in the Distance

1845 - Heath Scene with Cattle (oil), Showery Weather

1846 - Erith Reach, Morning

1847 - Coast Scene, Morning

The Royal Academy of Arts, Burlington House, Piccadilly. Phillips exhibited 16 pictures between 1831 and 1858.

1831 - View near Kits Coty House, Aylesford, Kent; Knights Bridge at Knightsbridge

1834 - Fishing Boats

1835 - View on the Thames, Evening

1837 - Part of Blackwall Reach, Bleak Blowing Weather; View of Greenwich Hospital

1839 - Stirling Castle; River Scene, Evening

1845 View on The Thames Near Purfleet

1846 - View on the Thames near Erith; The Thames from Hungerford Bridge, Evening; The Harbour of Shoreham on the River Adur, with the Town in the Distance, Evening

1849 - View on The Thames, Boats Beating to Windward; Chelsea Reach, Evening

1850 - View on the Thames from East Greenwich, with Woolwich in the Distance (oil)

1852 - View on the Wye, South Wales, with the Severn and English Coast in the Distance, taken from the Wynd Cliff

1853 - In Windsor Great Park, Twilight

1858 - Kensington Gardens, Evening

Institute for the Free Exhibition of Modern Art. Portland Gallery, Hyde Park Corner. Organiser was E.J. Neimann. Phillips exhibited 8 pictures, watercolours and oils in 1848-9. Prices exist showing he made between 5 and 10 guineas for a watercolour and between 25 guineas and £40.00 for an oil painting.

1848 - Heath Scene, Sunset; Heath Scene with Cattle, Showery Weather (oil); Sunset

1849 - View on the Thames, near Vauxhall Bridge; River Scene, Twilight; Park Scenery, Sunset after Rain; The Wreckers; Muswell Hill, Evening

Dudley Gallery

1866 - Hampstead Heath, Twilight

Royal Manchester Institution. He exhibited 6 pictures at Manchester between 1839 and 1846.

1839 - View on the Forth near Stirling

1842 - Coast Scene, Evening

1843 - View in Mousley Park, Surrey, the Seat of J Todd Esq; View on the Thames with Fishing Boats, The Isle of Sheppey in the Distance (oil)

1843 - Coast Scene - Evening, after Stormy weather

1846 - View on the Thames - Erith Reach

New Watercolour Society

1832 - Old Buildings at Deptford, Twilight; View at Millbank, Morning; View on the Thames, Evening; Twilight; Tower Stairs, Twilight; View from Greenwich, Sunset; Twilight Composition; Canal Scene, Morning; Windsor Castle from Brocas Meadow; Lane at Streatley, Beds; Coast Scene, Sunset; Rochester Castle

1834 - View from Mill Hill, Gravesend; View of the Thames from Gravesend; Coast Scene, Morning

== Pictures sold at auction ==
Art Prices Current Vol 1 1907-8

1908 - Rosherville on Thames - Sold by Executors of Richard Mills, 34 Queens Gate Place, London Drawing: G F Phillips, 9.5 x 12.5 inches, (Huggins) £3.13.6

1908 - A Landscape - Sold from collection of pictures and drawings of Sir Jas. Knowles deceased. Drawings in folio: £18/-

1912 - Fishing Boat off a Port" and "View on the Thames, Sunset - Christies Sale of Drawings£15/-.

1914 - View on the Thames" and "Cottage with Figures and Donkeys - Christies Sale of Drawings£15/-

1968 - A View on the Thames from East Greenwich, with Woolwich in the Distance. - Christies Lot 129 signed, oil on canvas, 15.5 x 39.5 inches. Exhibition, Royal Academy 1850, no: 434. £200.

1988 - On the Thames - Christies, King Street, St James, London. Sale ref: MR4798 Lot 87, watercolour 9 x 13.5 inches, signed and inscribed on verso. £420

1993 - On the Thames (same as above.) Christies, South Kensington, Lot 84, (Sale DRG 4893, Stock No: FN415,) Sold to Swan Gallery, Sherborne, Dorset for £190

1990 - A View from the Thames from Blackheath - Bonhams, Sale of 19th Century Watercolours. Lot 45 watercolour, signed, 8 x 13 inches. £120

1990 A Lighthiouse above an Estuary Christie's-South-Kensington. Lot 234.22.9 x 35.6 cm - ( 9 x 14 in) Sold for £54

1995 - Phillips, Cornubia Hall, Par, Cornwall Lot 690. A Pair of Estuary Scenes, one with steam tugs and barges, the other with horse and cart unloading a beached barge. One signed. Watercolours, 9.5 x 13.75 inches approx.

1996 - Beached Fishing Boats," and "Estuary with ditto - Western Road Auction Rooms, Angmering, Sussex Lot 401. "Two early 20th century watercolours, one signed G F Phillips, 4.5 x 6.1 inches [2 halves of a single painting, now restored and mounted as such, 14 x 5 inches]

1996 - Elegant Figures Promenading in Syon Park - Christies Sale of British and Continental Pictures, South Kensington, London, Lot 185. inscribed "Sion House the Seat/ of the Duke of Northumberland /By G F Phillips" on a label on the reverse. Oil on board. 12 x 18 inches £420

1997 - Custom House Quay and Billingsgate, with Old London Bridge - Phillips, New Bond Street, London Lot 18A.. Watercolour 9 x 13.5 inches, signed and inscribed in pencil on verso. Est. £800-1200.

1998 - Cattle Beside the River Thames, a Country House Amidst Trees - Phillips at Higham House, Canterbury, watercolour 8.25 x 16.25 inches. Est £300-500

1998 - Extensive River Landscape with Shipping and Dwellings - Phillips, Chester Lot 719, Watercolour with scratching out, signed G. Phillips, 15 x 25 cm (5.75 x 9.75 inches,) Est. £160-240 £400

2001 - Grounds of Sion House, the seat of the Duke of Northumberland - Bonhams and Brooks, London, Lot 47 Oil on board, signed and inscribed on label on verso, 30.7 x 46.5 cm sold for £220

2002 - The Road from Tintern to Chepstow - Jacobs & Hunt, Petersfield, Hants, watercolour, signed 26 x 37 cm (10 x 14.5 inches) £380
