= Billington (surname) =

Billington is an English surname arising from several places in Lancashire and Staffordshire, and possibly Bedfordshire.

Notable people with the surname include:

- Adeline Billington (1826–1917), English actress and teacher
- Clyde Billington Jr. (1934–2018), American businessman, chemist, and politician
- Craig Billington (born 1966), retired Canadian ice hockey goaltender
- Elizabeth Billington (1765–1818), British opera singer
- Francelia Billington (1895–1934), American actress
- Fred Billington (1862–1917), English singer and actor
- Geoff Billington, British showjumper
- James Billington (1847 – 1901), English executioner
- James H. Billington (1929–2018), United States Librarian of Congress
- John Billington (1580s–1630), an immigrant on the Mayflower and first Englishman to be hanged in New England
- John Billington (actor) (1830–1904), English actor
- John Billington (1880 – 1905), English executioner
- Joseph Billington, English footballer
- Kevin Billington (1934–2021), British film director
- Michael Billington (actor) (1941–2005), British film and television actor
- Michael Billington (critic) (born 1939), the drama critic of The Guardian
- Michael Billington (activist), activist in the LaRouche movement, author of Reflections of an American Political Prisoner
- Polly Billington, radio reporter
- Rachel Billington (born 1942), British author
- Ray Allen Billington (1903–1981), American historian
- Teresa Billington-Greig (1877–1964), suffragette and one of 70 founders of the Women's Freedom League
- Teddy Billington (1882–1966), US Olympic cyclist
- Thomas Billington (1872 – 1902), English executioner
- Tom Billington (1958–2018), English professional wrestler best known as Dynamite Kid
- Wilf Billington (1930–2023), British footballer who also played in Australia
- William Billington (1875 – 1952), English executioner
- William Billington (poet) (1825–1884), English poet

== See also ==
- Thomas Billington (disambiguation)
- Billinton
