= Kate Saville =

English actress

Kate Saville (1835/1836 – 7 May 1922) was an English actress. She played leading roles in original productions of many plays in the 1860s.

== Life ==
Kate Saville was a daughter of John Faucit Saville, an actor and playwright, and sister of the actress Helena Faucit. She first appeared on the London stage in September 1859, in Ivy Hall, adapted by John Oxenford from Le Roman d'un jeune homme pauvre by Octave Feuillet.

In January 1860 she appeared in original productions staged by Madame Céleste, manager of the Lyceum Theatre in London: as Lucie Manette in A Tale of Two Cities, and later as Milaine de St Ange in The House on the Bridge of Notre Dame.

She was engaged for the next two years at the Olympic Theatre in London. Here she created roles in new plays: as Martha Gibbs in Tom Taylor's All that Glitters is not Gold, as Lady Camilla Hailstone in Watts Phillips's Camilla's Husband, and as May Edwards in Tom Taylor's The Ticket-of-Leave Man. At the Royal Strand Theatre in October 1863 she played the leading role in the original production of Miriam's Crime by H. T. Craven.

In February 1864 at the Princess's Theatre she was Beatrice in the original performance of Paul's Return by Watts Phillips; in April 1866 she created the role of Hester Lorrington in The Favourite of Fortune by John Westland Marston, at the Haymarket Theatre.

In September 1866 at the Surrey Theatre she played the lead female role, Mrs Truegold, in True to the Core by A. R. Slous. This was the prize drama for that year in a competition established in the will of the actor Thomas Cooke and administered by the Royal Dramatic College.

In 1872 Kate Saville married William Roby Thorpe, and retired from the stage. She died in 1922 at her home in Nottingham, aged 86.
