= No Thoroughfare =

1867 novel and play by Dickens and Collins

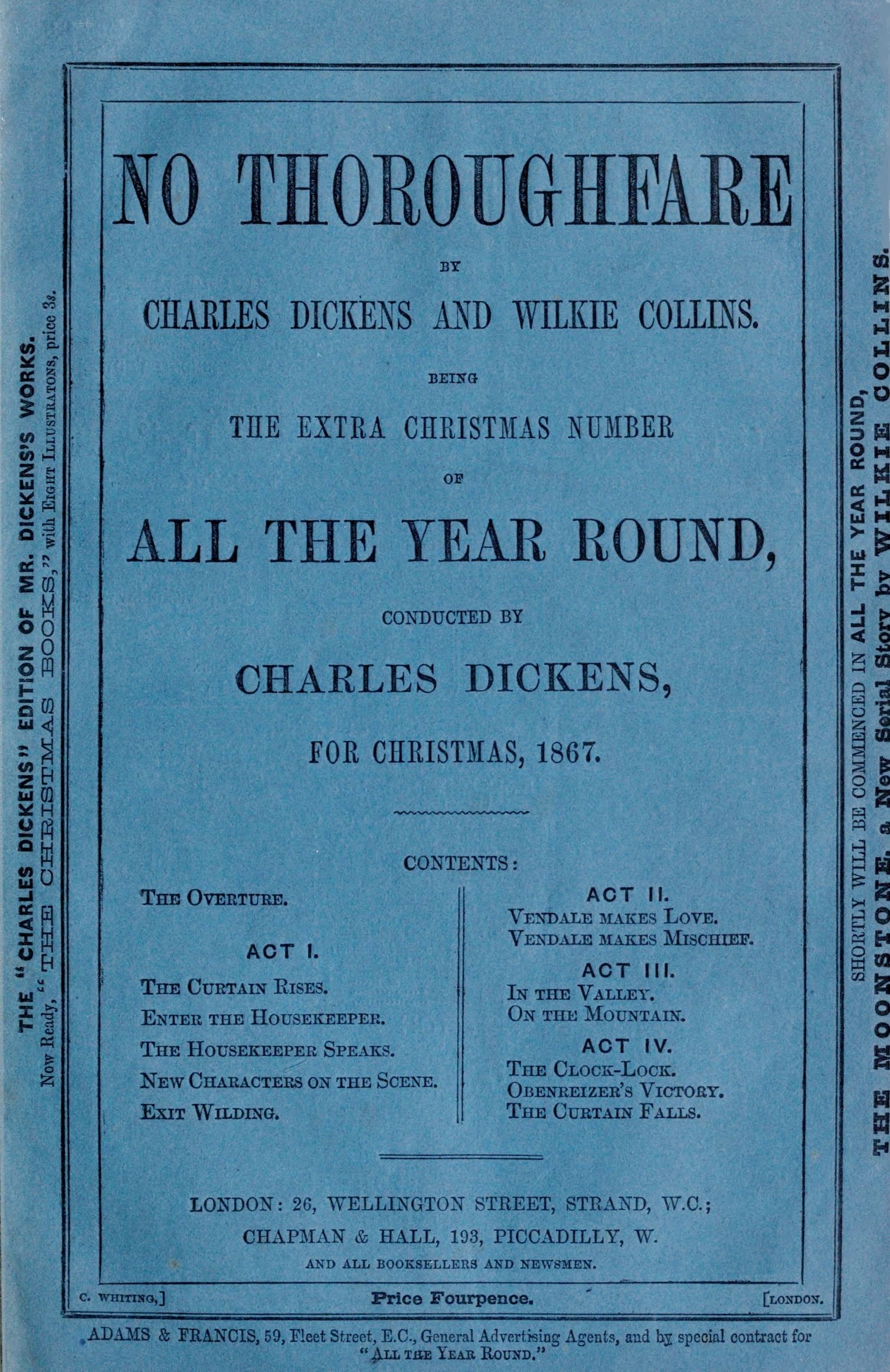
First edition cover

No Thoroughfare is a stage play and novel by Charles Dickens and Wilkie Collins, both released in December 1867.

== Background ==
In 1867 Charles Dickens and Wilkie Collins collaborated to produce a stage play titled No Thoroughfare: A Drama: In Five Acts. The two had previously collaborated on the play The Frozen Deep. This was the last stage production to be associated with Dickens, who died in June 1870. The play opened at the Adelphi Theatre on 26 December 1867.

The novel No Thoroughfare was also first published in 1867, in the Christmas number of Dickens's periodical All the Year Round. There are thematic parallels with other books from Dickens's mature writings, including Little Dorrit (1857) and especially Our Mutual Friend (1865).

The publication of the story in All The Year Round represents an early example of commercial merchandising, promoting the story to those who were aware of the stage play, and the play to those who had read the book. The chapters of the book are referred to as 'acts', and match the acts of the play.

In the book Collins assisted in Act 1 and Act 4; Collins scripted most of the stage play with Dickens's assistance.

== Plot summary ==
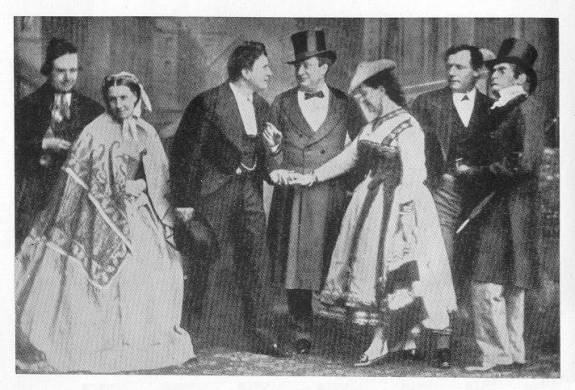
No Thoroughfare by Charles Dickens and Wilkie Collins. Left to right: Joey Ladle (Benjamin Webster), Sally Goldstraw (Mrs. Alfred Mellon), George Vendale (Henry G. Neville), Jules Obenreizer (Charles Albert Fechter), Marguerite (Carlotta Leclercq), Walter Wilding (John Billington), and Bintrey (George G. Belmore)

Two boys from the Foundling Hospital are given the same name, Walter Wilding, with disastrous consequences in adulthood. After the death of one – now a proprietor of a wine merchant's company – the executors, to right the wrong, are commissioned to find a missing heir. Their quest takes them from wine cellars in the City of London to the sunshine of the Mediterranean – across the Alps in winter. Danger and treachery would prevail were it not for the courage of the heroine, Marguerite, and a faithful company servant.

== The novel ==
The story contains crafted descriptions, well-drawn and diverse characters, eerie and exotic backgrounds, mystery, semi-concealed identities, brinkmanship with death, romance, the eventual triumph of Good over Evil, and many other elements expected in classic Dickens.

At 48,000 words it is the length of many modern novels, and longer than any of Dickens' Christmas novels, which are all between 31,000 and 34,000 words.

== The stage play ==
The stage play follows a similar plotline to the novel, but is compressed and made particularly dramatic in the fourth act, which is set in the Swiss Alps. The tension builds to a spectacular scene in which Obenreizer, the villain, confronts the hero George Vendale, at the side of a mountain gorge. It has been performed rarely since the 1867 West End premiere, in 1876 at the Olympic Theatre and in 1904 at a small theatre in Islington. However, on 2 June 2007 Primavera Productions produced a staged reading, directed by Tom Littler, at the King's Head Theatre in London. The reading starred Louise Brealey as Marguerite.
