= Rose Leclercq =

English actress (1843–1899)

Leclercq as Lady Wargrave in The New Woman, 1894

Rose Leclercq (2 February 1843 – 2 April 1899) was an English actress, possibly best known for creating the role of Lady Bracknell in Oscar Wilde's The Importance of Being Earnest in 1895.

== Life and career ==
Leclercq was born in Liverpool, as Rose Clark, one of the four daughters of Charles Clark (1797–1861) and his wife, Margaret, née Burnet. Clark, a pantomimist and ballet master, performed under the stage name of Charles Leclercq. His two daughters who followed him into the theatrical profession, Rose, and her elder sister Carlotta, both adopted his stage surname.

On her sixth birthday Leclercq played Ceres in the masque scene of The Tempest at Windsor Castle. In October 1860 she appeared in London in Dion Boucicault's The Corsican Brothers. A year later she played Desdemona to Charles Albert Fechter's Othello. In 1863 she was the original Mary Vance in F. C. Burnand's The Deal Boatman and Astarte in Byron's Manfred.

In April 1864 Leclercq married Charles Perry Fuller, a horse dealer, with whom she had a son, the actor Fuller Mellish. Fuller and Leclercq divorced in 1871.

In 1868 Leclercq played Eliza in Boucicault's After Dark and Kate Jessop in his Lost at Sea; in 1875 she was the first Clara Ffolliott in The Shaughraun. Over the next twenty years she appeared in new and classic roles, the latter including Olivia in Twelfth Night with Henry Irving and Ellen Terry. Her roles in new plays included Marie Leczinska in W. G. Wills's The Pompadour (1888), and Lady Wargrave in Sydney Grundy's The New Woman towards the end of 1894.

In 1895 Leclercq originated the role of Lady Bracknell in The Importance of Being Earnest. The critics of The Times and The Observer remarked on how she brought out the cynicism of the character. Her last role was with Cyril Maude and Winifred Emery at the Haymarket; she played Mrs Beechinor in H A Jones's The Manoeuvres of Jane. She played this part from October 1898 to March the following year, when she was taken ill.

Leclercq died from influenza and bronchial pneumonia at her home in Chelsea, at the age of 56. In a biographical article written two years after her death the critic Joseph Knight wrote, "Rose Leclercq in her later days had a matchless delivery, and was the best, and almost the only, representative of the grand style in comedy."
