= Billington =

Billington may refer to:

- Billington (surname)
- Billington, Bedfordshire, a small parish in England, United Kingdom
- Billington, Lancashire, a larger village in England, United Kingdom
- Billington Heights, New York, a hamlet in New York, United States
- Billingtons, a sugar company founded in 1858 by Edward Billington, taken over by British Sugar in 2004
