= Helen Ernstone =

English actress

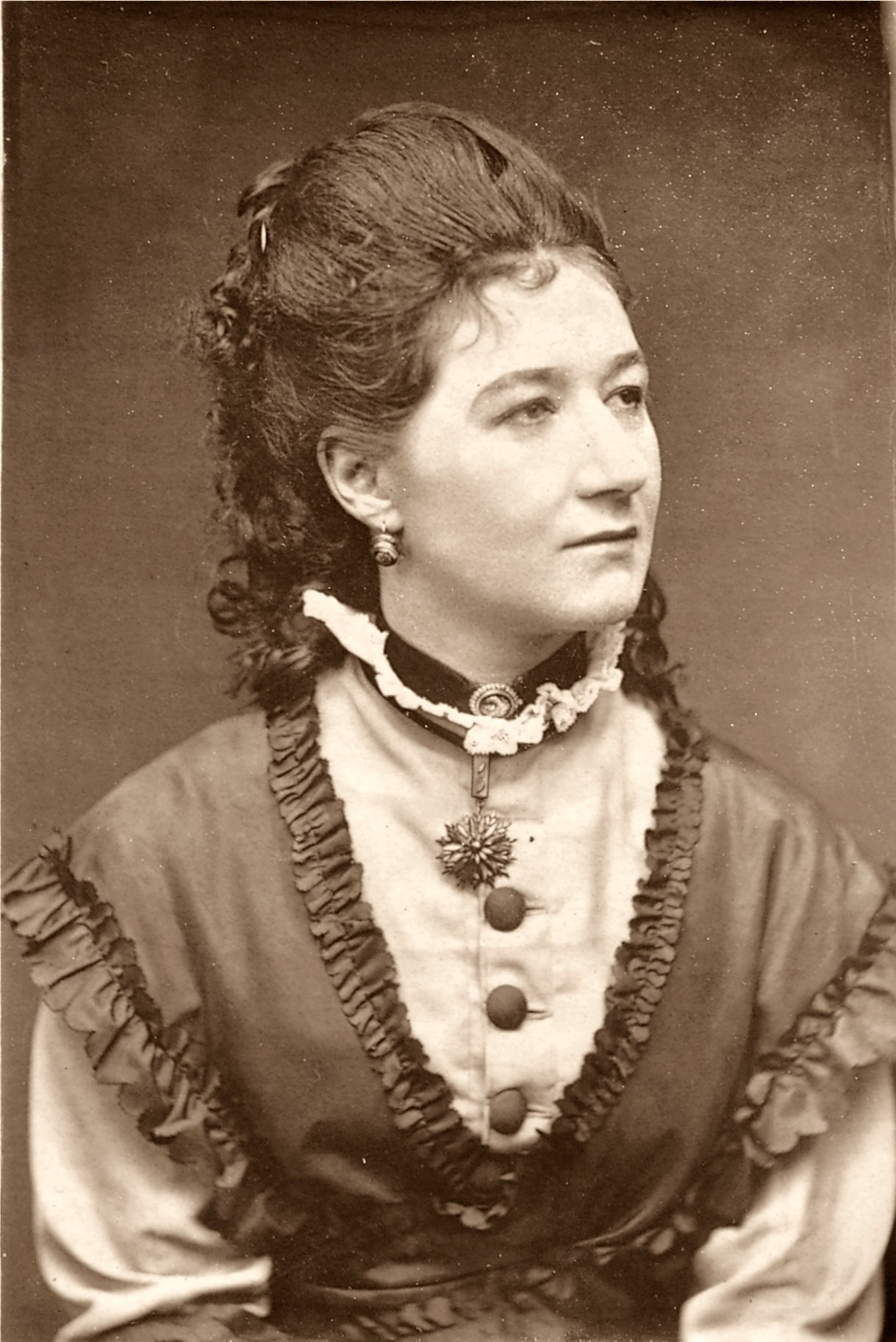
Helen Ernstone

Helena Cécile Ernstone, (née Hélène Cecilia Schott; circa 1841 Gibraltar – 2 July 1933 Ferndown, Dorset, England) was an English actress who appeared in London theatres from 1867 to 1881.

== Biography ==
=== Family ===
She was the fourth daughter of Adam Joseph Schott (1794–1864), the youngest of five children of Bernhard Schott, the founder of German music publisher B. Schott's Söhne. After establishing several international branches for the firm, Adam left to pursue a musical career, performing in New York during 1830/1. He then became bandmaster of the 79th Regiment, serving in Quebec and Toronto, before a period with the 79th in Britain and then Gibraltar. He left the 79th there to become bandmaster of Grenadier Guards 1844–1856. Adam died in India (Kirkee, 1864), as bandmaster of Royal Artillery there.

Helen's eldest sister, Rosa Schott (née Rosa Antoinette Schott; born Toronto 1834), was on the London stage, at the Theatre Royal, Haymarket for much of 1854–6. She performed there with actor Robert Edwin Villiers (1830–1904), whom she married in 1856. Villiers then began a long spell in music hall, as a manager/licensee and then owner/developer. Amongst his halls were the Margate Assembly Rooms, the Canterbury Music Hall (see below), the South London and the Pavilion (still standing at Piccadilly Circus). Rosa died in Torquay 1918. She and Villiers were estranged from around 1871 and it appears that a relationship between Villiers and Ernstone may have been a factor.

Helen's younger sister, Angie Schott (née Angelika Francesca Schott; born London circa 1846), was also an actress, active in the US in the 1870s. Sometime in the 1870s or 1880s, Angie married Henry S. Truax (died 1917 in Saratoga Springs, New York, with no known living relatives). What became of Angie is unknown.

=== Career ===
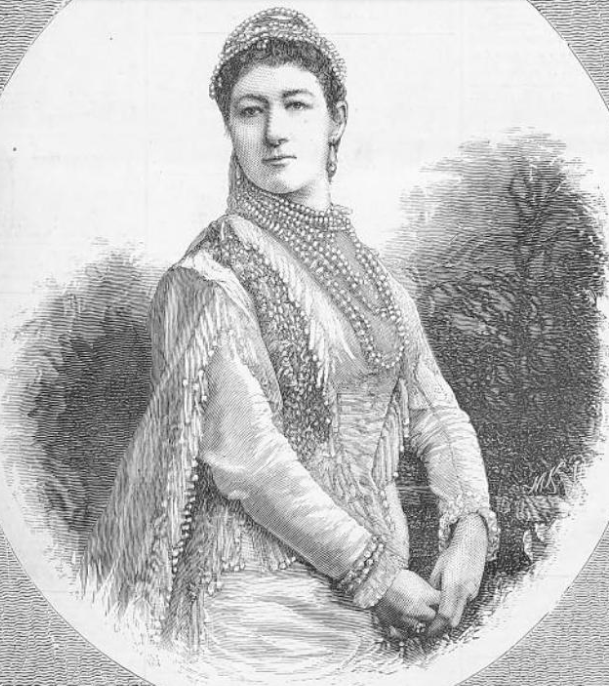
An illustration of Helen Ernstone in costume c.1878

Ernstone began her professional career in provincial theatres, playing the role of Geraldine in Buckstone's The Green Bushes at The Canterbury Music Hall, Lambeth in 1867. She made her London debut in 1868 at Covent Garden as Katherine in Katherine and Petruchio. In 1869, she played in Charles Smith Cheltnam's (1823–1912) Edendale at the opening of the Charing Cross Theatre. The Times wrote: "Among the novices are Miss Ernstone, from Manchester, a young lady of prepossessing appearance, who plays Ada Vandaleur... with much force". For the next ten years she appeared on the West End stage in juvenile leads. At the Olympic Theatre later in 1869, she was Martha in Little Em'ly by Andrew Halliday, based on Dickens's David Copperfield. The following year she moved to the Globe Theatre in Philomel, part of a double-bill with The Ticket-of-Leave Man, and in the same year, she appeared in Man o' Airlie with Hermann Vezin. Also in 1870, she created the part of Katie Maguire in Inisfallen by Edmund Falconer at the Lyceum Theatre, London and played Lizzie Hexham in another adaptation of a Dickens novel, Our Mutual Friend, at the Opera Comique. The Observer wrote of this production, "Her acting... is poetical in the highest sense.... If we mistake not, Miss Ernstone will occupy a distinguished position on the stage."

In 1873 at Astley's Theatre, Ernstone played the title role in The Fair Rosamond by William Mower Akhurst (1822–1878). That year, at the Olympic, she played Grace Roseberry in Wilkie Collins's The New Magdalen, followed the next year by Henriette in The Two Orphans by John Oxenford, with Henry Neville and the young Rutland Barrington. In 1875 she created the role of Ruth Leigh in The Detective at the Mirror Theatre (formerly the Holborn). The Times thought the play too long and called for drastic cuts, but added, "Miss Ernstone plays the devoted Ruth in so earnest a spirit that we cannot express without regret our fears that the part will be terribly reduced when the abbreviations of the piece are effected." In 1878 at the Haymarket Theatre, she played Olivia in Twelfth Night and returned to the Olympic in a revival of The Two Orphans. The following year, she appeared at the Olympic as Marguerite Duval in a melodrama called Mother and at the Standard Theatre as Margaret Wentworth in Henry Dunbar.
