= William Hurton =

English author and journalist

William Hurton (1825–1862) was a British writer and journalist living in Edinburgh, best known for his tales of arctic travel. Hurton's story Vonved the Dane, Count of Elsinore, serialized in The Dublin Magazine in 1860, caught the attention of William Makepeace Thackeray, who wrote to Hurton asking him to call.

== Major works ==
- A Voyage from Leith to Lapland or: Pictures from Scandinavia in 1850, London, R. Bentley, 2nd Revised Edition 1852.
- Visit to an Encampment of Laplanders, Harper's New Monthly Magazine, 1852
- The Doomed Ship: or, The Wreck of the Arctic Regions, embellished with sixteen engravings, by Watts Phillips, London : Willoughby & Co., 1856
- Vonved the Dane, Count of Elsinore, serialized in The Dublin Magazine in 1860, published anonymously in book form in 1861
- Hearts of Oak, or Naval yarns. By the author of "Vonved the Dane". London: Richard Bentley, 1862 (originally published in the Dublin University Magazine)
