= A Charm of Lullabies =

Song cycle by Benjamin Britten, on poems by William Blake

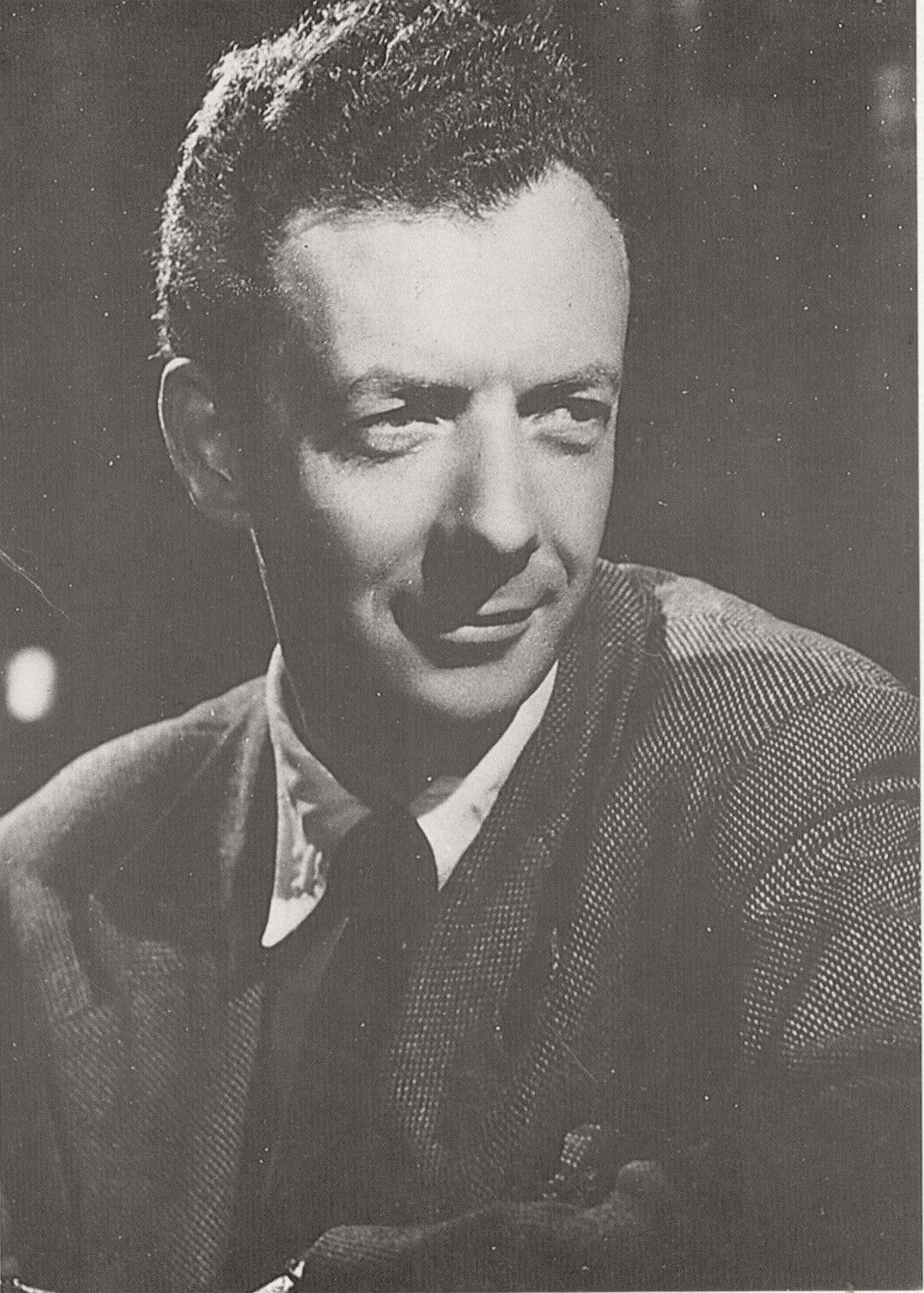
Benjamin Britten in the 1940s

A Charm of Lullabies, Op.41 is a song cycle for mezzo-soprano with piano accompaniment by Benjamin Britten. It consists of five songs composed on poems by William Blake, Robert Burns, Robert Greene, Thomas Randolph and John Phillip. It was written in 1947 for Nancy Evans, who gave the first performance with Felix de Nobel (piano) at a festival in The Hague 3 January 1948. The score was first published in 1949 by Boosey and Hawkes in London.

A performance of the cycle takes about 12 minutes. The variety of texts lends itself to variety of music, and questions the concept of 'lullaby'; especially the fourth song, "A Charm", which humorously threatens the child with all sorts of torment if it doesn't go to sleep.

== The songs ==
1. William Blake (1757–1827) – "A Cradle Song" (Poems from the Notebook, c.1794, verses 1–2 and 4–5 only)
2. Robert Burns (1759–96) – "A Highland Balou" (Last Songs for the Scots Musical Museum, c.1792. Published in Volume 5, 1839)
3. Robert Greene (1558–92) – "Sephestia's Lullaby" (from the prose-poem Menaphon, 1589, verses 1 and 3 only)
4. Thomas Randolph (1605–35) – "A Charm" (from The Jealous Lovers, 1632, the two stanzas beginning "Quiet sleep")
5. John Phillip (fl. 1561) – "The Nurse's Song" (from The Commodye of Pacient and Meeke Grissill, c.1559, "Lullaby baby, thy nurse will tend thee")

== Sources ==
- Britten, Benjamin (2004). Donald Mitchell (ed.). Letters from a Life: The Selected Letters of Benjamin Britten, Volume III, 1946–1951. London: Faber and Faber. ISBN 057122282X.
