= Millington (surname) =

Millington is a surname. Notable people with the surname include:

- Abel Millington (1787–1838), American politician
- Charles S. Millington (1855–1913), American politician and banker from New York
- Charlie Millington (1882–1945), English footballer
- Chris Millington (born 1975), English football coach
- Ernest Millington (1916–2009), British politician
- Grenville Millington (1951–2025), Chester City footballer
- Gordon Millington (1848–1923), New Zealand cricketer
- James Heath Millington (1799–1872), British painter
- June Millington (born 1948), Filipino-American guitarist, songwriter, producer, educator, and actress
- Lucy Millington (1825–1900), American botanist
- Margaret Millington (1944–1973), English-born mathematician
- Mary Millington (1945–1979), British porn star
- Mil Millington, British author
- Richard Millington, British ornithologist
- Ross Millington (born 1989), British long-distance runner
- Sir Thomas Millington (1628–1704), English physician
- Tony Millington (1943–2015), Welsh footballer
- William Millington (1917–1940), Australian fighter pilot
