= Thomas Billington =

Thomas Billington or Tom Billington may refer to:

- Thomas Billington (executioner) (1872–1902), English executioner
- Tommy Billington, English professional wrestler, nephew of the Dynamite Kid and half of the tag team Billington Bulldogs
- Dynamite Kid, (Thomas Billington) (1958–2018), British professional wrestler.
- Tom Billington (athlete), Welsh runner
