= James Heath Millington =

British painter

- Born: 1799; Cork, Ireland
- Died: 11 August 1872 (aged 72–73); London
- Occupation: Painter

James Heath Millington (1799 – 11 August 1872) was a British painter.

== Biography ==
Millington was born at Cork, Ireland though not of Irish parentage. In 1826 he entered the schools of the Royal Academy in London, and gained many prizes there, though he was not successful in winning the gold medal for painting. He first exhibited at the Royal Academy in 1831, sending ‘A Portrait of J. C. Bishop, esq.,’ and ‘Vulcan's Cave.’ He continued to be a frequent exhibitor of subject pictures, portraits, and miniatures there and also at the British Institution and Suffolk Street Galleries up to 1870. Millington, who was for a short time curator of the School of Painting at the Royal Academy, died in 1873.
