= John Phillips (surveyor) =

British engineer and surveyor (d. 1897)

John Phillips (died 1897) was a British engineer and surveyor in the first half of the 19th century. His work and reports led to the building of London's sewage system.

== London in the 1840s ==
By the 1840s, London's population numbered over two million, living in several hundred thousand households. An awareness of the need for sewerage reform and development led to the first comprehensive study of the metropolis for the purpose of planning sewerage improvements.

The conditions in London resembled those of most cities of two hundred years ago. By that time nearly every residence had a cesspool which collected and stored all house wastes beneath its first floor. With cesspools overflows, failure of proper drainage and the contamination of drinking water, epidemics and lingering illnesses became common. Fires and explosions due to methane build up in unventilated cesspools were just as frequent. Such conditions are vividly described in the following account from 1849, when workers entering to examine cesspools with oil lamps triggered sudden blasts:

"Explosions occurred in two separate locations where the men had the skin peeled off their faces and their hair singed. In advancing toward Southampton, the deposit deepens to 2 feet 9 inches, leaving only 1 foot 11 inches of space in the sewer. At about 400 feet from the entrance, the first lamp went out and, 100 feet further on, the second lamp created an explosion and burnt the hair and face of the person holding it."

== John Phillips, surveyor of the Westminster Court of Sewers, report to Royal Commission 1847 ==
In 1847, the first official report on sewerage and drainage by the engineer John Phillips, contained the following description, which portrayed a typical situation of the time:

"I am of the opinion, that not one half of the entire filth produced in the metropolis finds its way into the sewers, but is retained in the cesspools and drains in and about the houses, where it lies decomposing, giving off noxious effluvia and poisonous sulphuretted hydrogen and other gases which constantly infect the atmosphere of such houses from top to bottom, and which, of course, the inhabitants are constantly breathing... There are hundreds, I may say thousands, of houses in this metropolis which have no drainage whatever, and the greater part of them have stinking, overflowing cesspools, and there are also hundreds of streets, courts and alleys that have no sewers; and how the drainage and filth are cleaned away and how the miserable inhabitants live in such places it is hard to tell. In pursuance of my duties, I have visited very many places where filth was lying scattered about the rooms, vaults, cellars, areas, and yards, so thick and so deep that it was hardly possible to move for it. I have also seen in such places human beings living and sleeping in sunk rooms with filth from overflowing cesspools exuding through and running down the walls and over the floors. It is utterly hopeless to expect to meet with either civilization, benevolence, religion or virtue, in any shape, where so much filth and wretchedness abounds The effects of the effluvia, stench and poisonous gases constantly evolving from these foul accumulations were apparent in the haggard, wan and swarthy countenances and enfeebled limbs of the poor creatures whom I found residing over and amongst these dens of pollution and wretchedness.... Morality, and the whole economy of domestic existence is outraged and deranged by so much suffering and misery."

== Separation of effluent from storm waters ==
Combined- Versus Separate-Sewer Systems Although sanitary wastes were a constant input to European sewer systems, designs did not anticipate this component until 1843 in Hamburg. The first types of wastewater legally allowed into the storm sewers were dishwater and other kitchen wastes. When the water closet came into general use in the mid-19th century, existing privy vaults and cesspools became overwhelmed. Eventually, this led to the permitted discharge of sanitary wastes into sewers previously restricted to surface runoff only, legally creating combined wastewater. The permitted discharge of sanitary wastes did not occur in London until 1847 (Kirby and Laurson 1932) or in Paris until 1880 (Reid 1991).

Phillips proposed the separate system of sewerage for London in 1849. But a few years later, Bazalgette's combined system was selected (Metcalf and Eddy 1928). Although supporters for separate sewerage existed, early systems were mostly combined because: (1) there was no European precedent for successful separate systems; (2) there was a belief that combined systems were cheaper to build than a complete separate system; and (3) engineers were not convinced that agricultural use of separate-sanitary wastewater was viable (Tarr 1979).
