= Leslie Grove Jones =

English Radical writer (1779-1839)

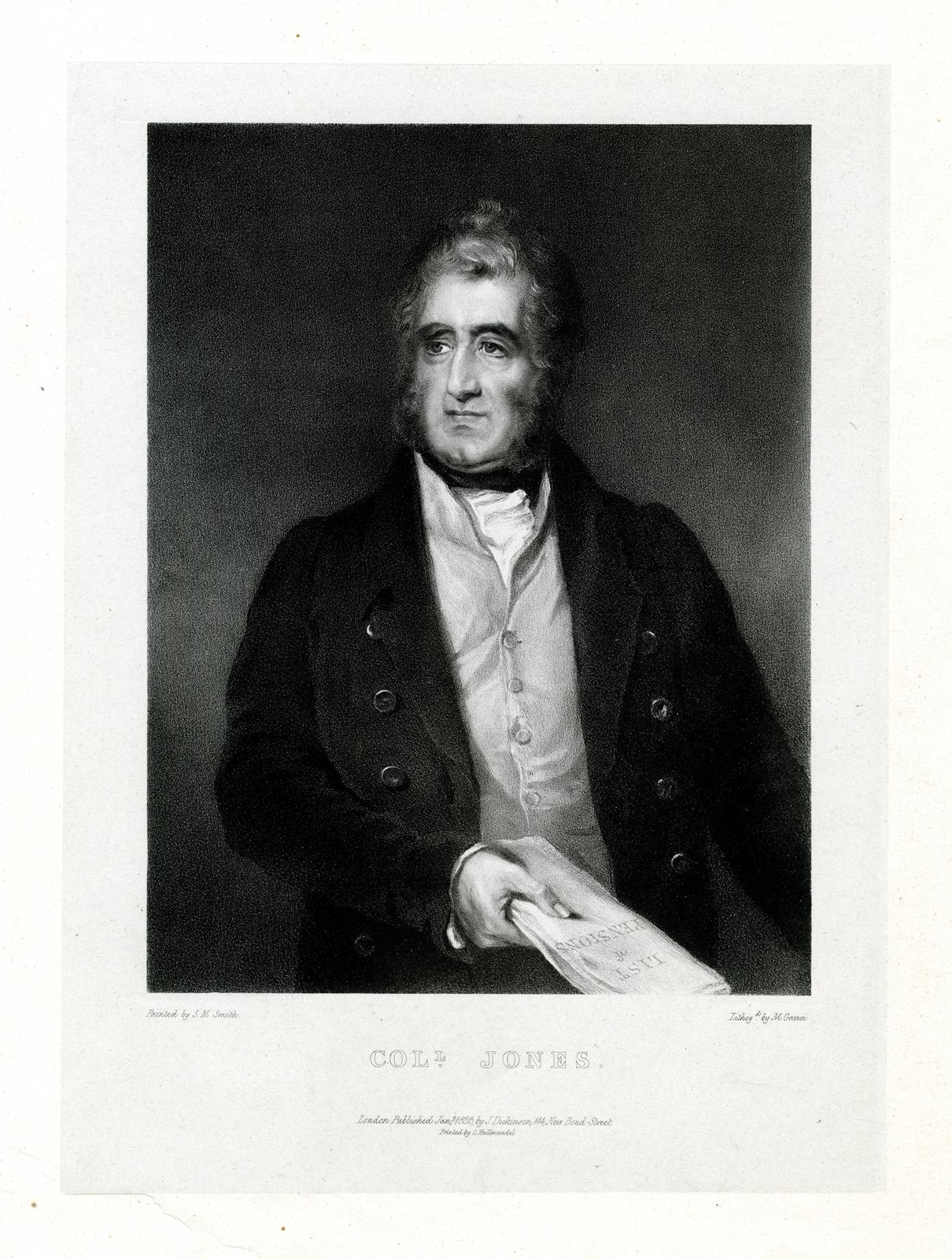
A lithograph of Jones by Maxim Gauci, 1833.

Colonel Leslie Grove Jones (1779-1839) was an English soldier and Radical political writer.

He rose to attention after a series of "powerfully written and very violent" letters to The Times from 1829 to 1832 under the pseudonym "Radical", especially concerning the passage of the Reform Bill.

== Life ==
Jones was born in Bearfield, near Bradford-on-Avon. He joined the Royal Navy as a midshipman; while serving aboard HMS Révolutionnaire he objected, or intervened, when the ship's cook was flogged for a reason Jones believed unfair, and was disciplined. He subsequently left the service.

In 1796 he joined the Army, having been offered an officer's commission in the Grenadier Guards by the Marquess of Lansdowne. He served throughout the Peninsular War and was promoted to his highest rank, that of lieutenant colonel, in 1813. While stationed at Cambrai in 1817 he wrote the pamphlet An Examination of the Principles of Legitimacy, eventually published in 1827. According to the foreword of the Principles, he also spent some time in the US around this period.

Jones was a friend of Jeremy Bentham, who nominated him for a seat on the governing Council of London University (later to become University College London) in 1829. Jones is mentioned as serving as a "proprietor" (similar to a trustee) of the University in 1831.

He married twice, first to Jean Miller (d. 1833), daughter of Patrick Miller, with whom he had two sons, Algernon Burdett Jones and Warren Miller Jones. His second marriage was in 1838, to the wealthy widow Anna-Maria Dashwood (née Shipley), a neighbour of Jones' in North Wales. The second Mrs Jones was a daughter of William Davies Shipley and a friend of Walter Savage Landor; Jones' marriage to her possibly broke off a previous relationship between her and Leigh Hunt.

Jones died on 12 March 1839, less than a year after his marriage to Anna-Maria. He had previously written in an 1831 letter to the Times that he wished for his body to be donated to medical science, a request that was then both unusual and, given that the Anatomy Act would not be passed until 1832, illegal. This did not happen, and he is buried at Kensal Green Cemetery.

== Involvement in politics ==
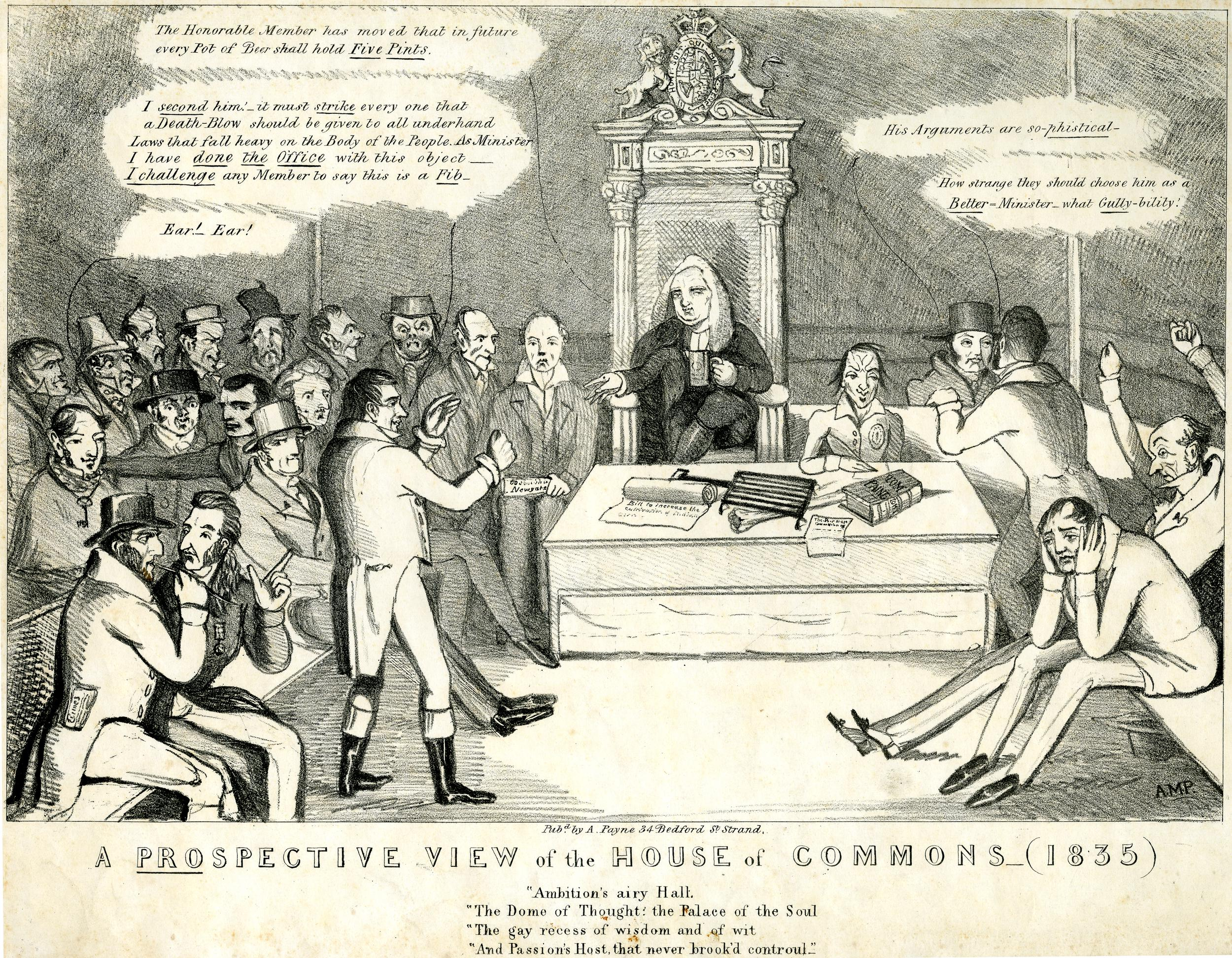
An 1835 satirical depiction of what the House of Commons would look like under a Radical government, with Jones on the bottom left.

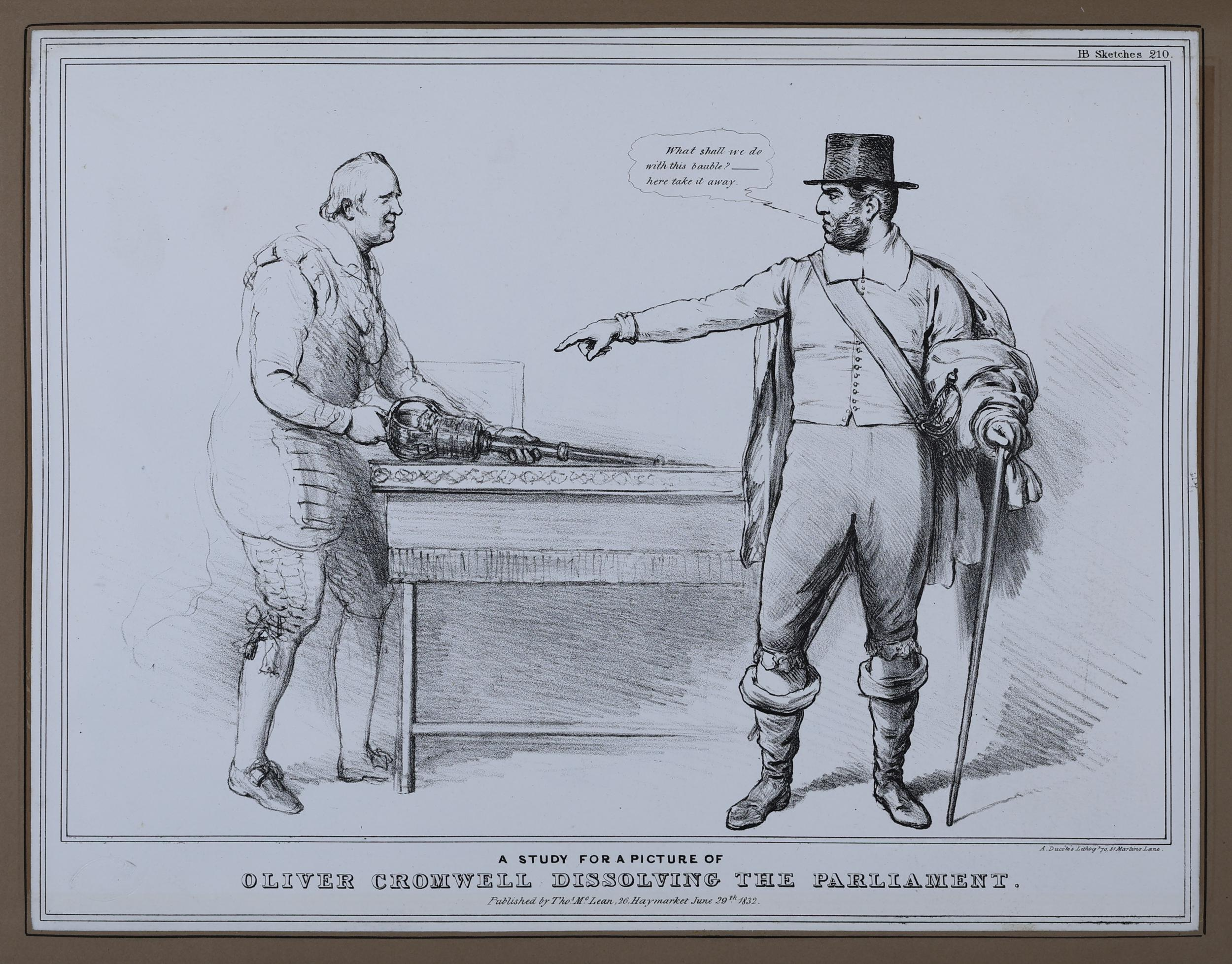
An 1832 satirical print by John Doyle, depicting Jones as Oliver Cromwell.

After retiring from the army Jones became involved in Radical politics. His name begins appearing in newspaper reports of meetings of reformist MPs and others in the early 1820s. His pamphlet An Examination of the Principles of Legitimacy was published in 1827. In late 1829 Jones began writing regularly to the Times under the pseudonym "Radical". It is not clear when it became generally known that he was the author, but the Times itself identifies the two in 1831 and his obituary treats it as common knowledge.

Jones features in a number of 1830s satirical depictions of Radical politicians. An 1835 print titled "A Prospective View of the House of Commons", caricaturing a hypothetical Radical government, shows Jones alongside William Cobbett, Henry Hunt, Daniel O'Connell, John Gully, Joseph Hume, John Gale Jones, and Richard Carlile among others.
