= Billinton =

Billinton is a surname. Notable people with the surname include:

- L. B. Billinton (1882–1954), the Locomotive Engineer of the London, Brighton and South Coast Railway from 1912 to 1923
- R. J. Billinton (1844–1904), the Locomotive, Carriage, Wagon and Marine Superintendent of the London, Brighton and South Coast Railway from 1890 to 1904
- Roy Billinton, Canadian professor

== See also ==
- Billington (surname)
