= Jonathan Phillips =

Jonathan Phillips may refer to:

- Sir Jonathan Phillips (civil servant) (born 1952), retired British civil servant
- Jonathan Phillips (ice hockey) (born 1982)
- Jonny Phillips (actor) (born 1963), English actor
- Jonathan Phillips, Professor of Crusading History at Royal Holloway, University of London since 2005, President of the Society of the Study of the Crusades and the Latin East (SSCLE) since 2021
