= The Ticket-of-Leave Man (play) =

Play written by Tom Taylor

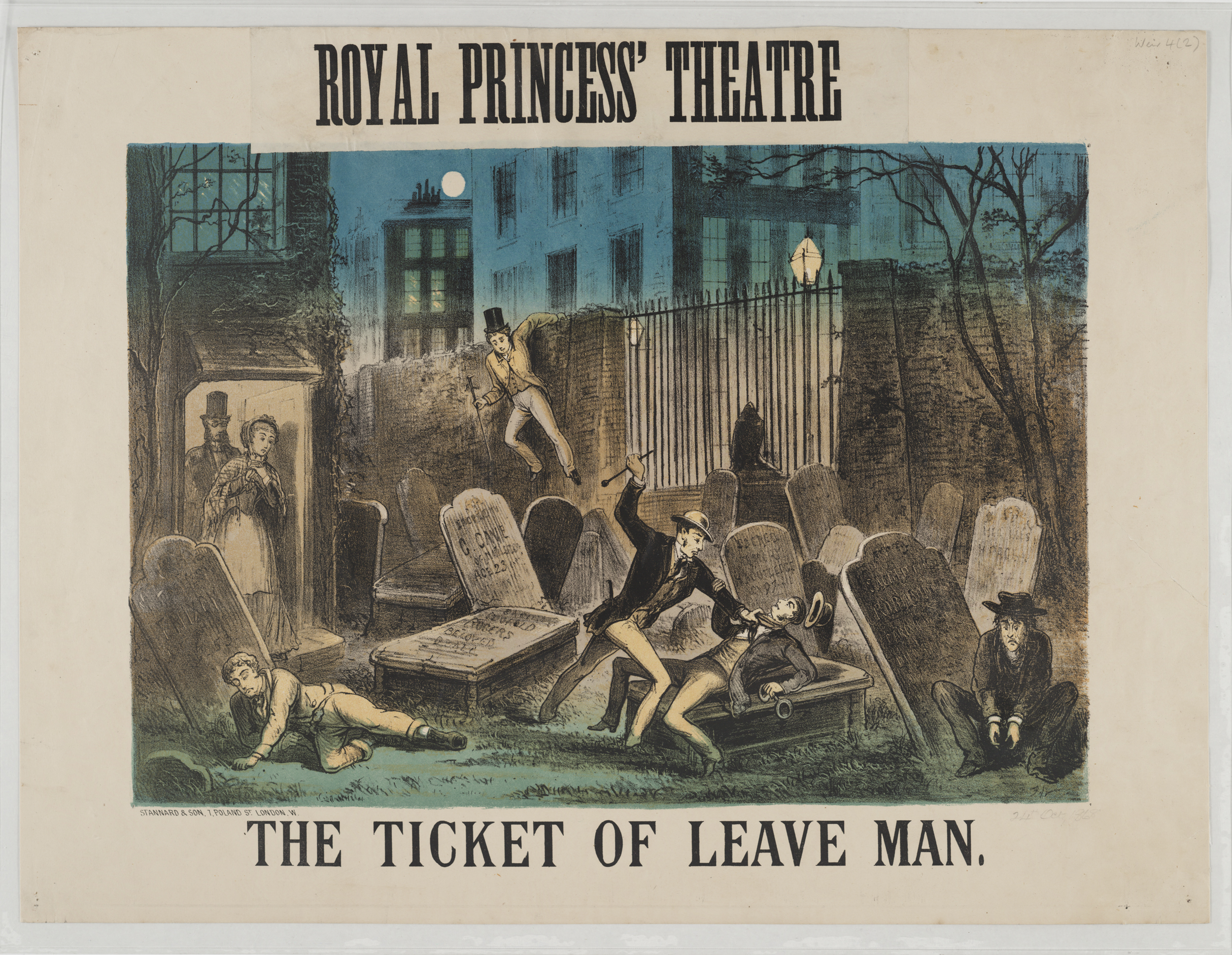
- A poster for a production of the play in 1868
- Written by: Tom Taylor
- Based on: Le Retour de Melun by Édouard Brisebarre and Eugene Nuz

Premiere
- Date: March 1863
- Place: Olympic Theatre, London

The Ticket-of-Leave Man is an 1863 stage melodrama in four acts by the British writer Tom Taylor, based on a French drama, Le Retour de Melun. It takes its name from the Ticket of Leave issued to convicts when they were released from jail on parole. A recently returned convict is blackmailed by another man into committing a robbery, but is rescued thanks to the intervention of a detective. It has been described as apparently being the first play to give a truly significant role to a detective.

The play introduced the character of Hawkshaw the Detective, with "Hawkshaw" becoming a synonym for a detective. It was not well received by critics, but proved very popular with audiences and was constantly revived, becoming one of the standard works of Victorian melodrama.

== First production ==
The play was first produced in March 1863 at the Olympic Theatre in London. The cast included Henry Neville as Robert Brierly, Horace Wigan as Hawkshaw, Robert Soutar as Green Jones and Kate Saville as May Edwards. A reviewer in The Spectator wrote, " Mr. Tom Taylor, one of our ablest dramatic writers, has treated a great social question with a definite purpose, a degree of artistic skill, and a depth of earnestness... which render The Ticket-of-Leave Man to be viewed in no ordinary light."

== Plot ==
Robert Brierly, a young man from Lancashire, is enjoying his first visit to London. Two criminals, Melter Moss and James Dalton, pretend to lend him money, giving him a forged note. Brierly is arrested when he tries to exchange the note for currency and is sentenced to four years in prison. He had been kind to May, a young woman, who waits for his release from prison, even though Brierly's forged note caused the ruin of May's landlady Mrs Willoughby. Brierly secretly repays the money to Mrs Willoughby. May and Brierly are planning to marry, but on the day of his wedding, his employer finds out that he is an ex-convict, and he is fired. Brierly cannot find work, and Moss and Dalton try to force him to help them rob the brokerage firm where he had worked. Brierly plays along but reports them to the police; a detective uses a disguise to help him. Brierly is wounded in a fight in a churchyard, but the criminals are arrested, and Brierly's honour is restored.

== Film adaptations ==
It has been turned into a number of film adaptations, mostly in the silent era. This included The Ticket of Leave Man (1912), The Ticket-of-Leave Man (1918) and the 1937 Tod Slaughter melodrama The Ticket of Leave Man.

The 1914 film The Ticket-of-Leave Man is not an adaptation of the play, but is based on the 1869 novel Foul Play written by Taylor's frequent collaborator Charles Reade.

== Bibliography ==
- Lachman, Marvin. The Villainous Stage: Crime Plays on Broadway and in the West End. McFarland, 2014.
