= John Phillips (physician) =

British physician

Sir John Phillips
- Born: 6 July 1855; Woburn, Bedfordshire, England
- Died: 8 December 1928 (aged 73)
- Scientific career
- Fields: Medicine
- Workplaces: King's College London, King's College Hospital

Sir John Phillips FRCP (6 July 1855 – 14 December 1928) was a senior British physician specialising in obstetrics.

== Biography ==
John Phillips was born on July 6,1855 at Birchmoor Manor, Woburn. He was the son of Zachary Phillips. He was educated at Elstow (County) School, Bedford, St John's College, Cambridge (Natural Sciences Tripos, 1876), and at King's College London, qualifying in medicine in 1881. He was elected as a fellow of the Royal College of Physicians in 1892, and as professor of Obstetric Medicine at King's College London in 1904. He was an Examiner in obstetric medicine for the University of Cambridge and the University of London, and consultant physician in obstetrics at King's College Hospital. He was appointed as Physician to the Queen in 1918 and knighted.

Phillips published widely in the field of Obstetrics, and his publications included Outline of Diseases of Women, 1893, which reached a fourth edition in 1906.

Phillips was twice married and had one son and three daughters.

Phillips died on 8 December 1928.
