= John Phillips (artist) =

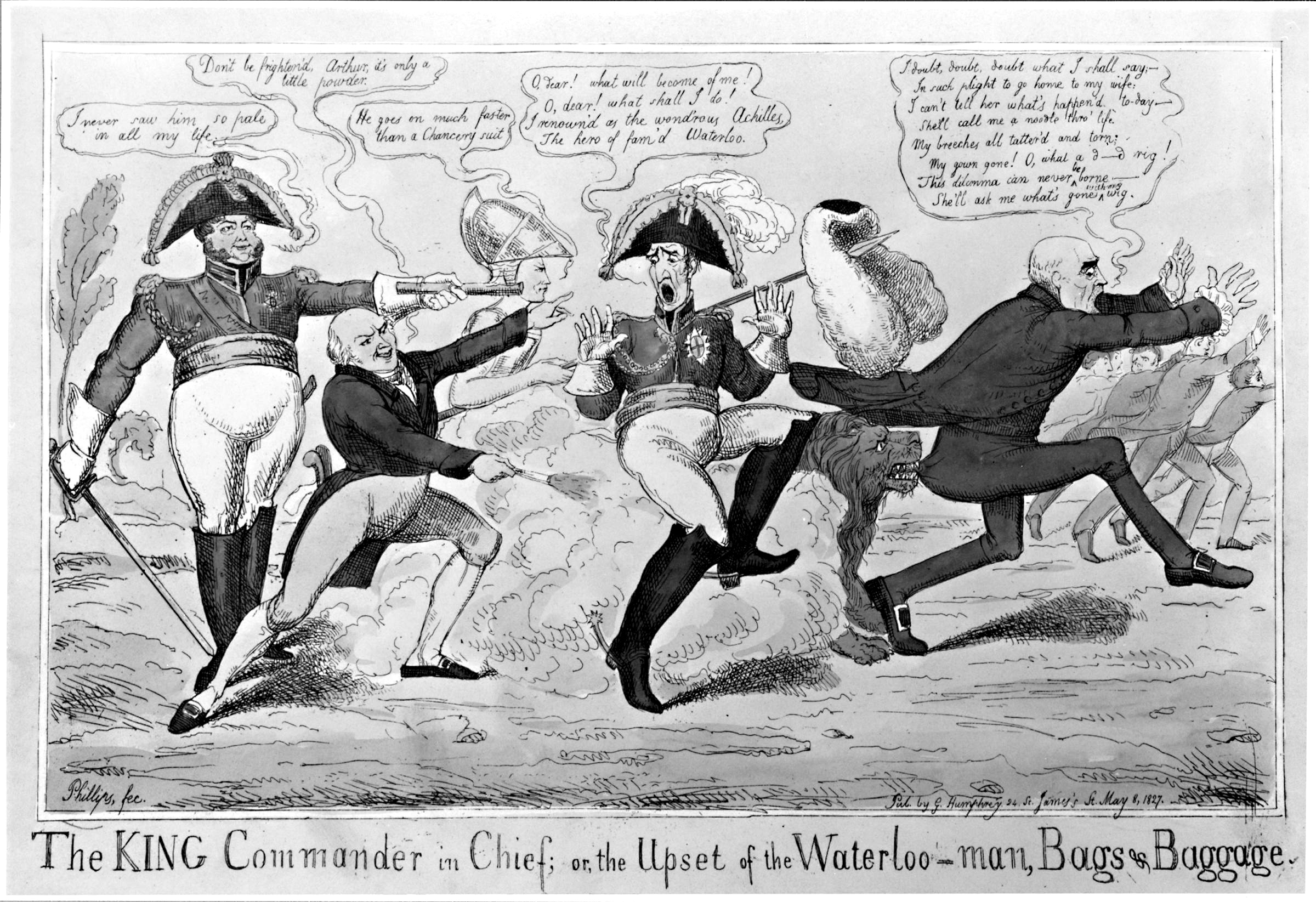
- The King Commander in Chief; or, the Upset of the Waterloo-man, Bags & Baggage by John Phillips
- Born: October 24, 1808; Westminster, England
- Died: after 1842 (aged 33–34)
- Known for: Etching

John Phillips (1808 – after 1842) was an English artist and illustrator. He is perhaps best known as a satirical etcher.

== Early life ==
John Phillips was the son of Giles Firman Phillips (1780–1867), and Lydia Arnold. He was born 24 October 1808 in the Parish of St James, Westminster, and baptised 28 May 1809 in the Tottenham Court Chapel in Tottenham Court Road. His mother died in 1839 and John lived for a time with his father at 8 Leicester Square (1831) 8, Richmond Buildings, Dean Street, Soho (1832-3), 60 Frith Street Soho, (1837) 16 Brownlow Street, and later (1841,) at 85 Newman Street. His first print was published in 1825 at the age of 17. He published a number of satirical prints between 1825 and 1830 for G Humphrey and others.

Phillips is known to have used the pseudonym "A. Sharpshooter", who published a series of prints through S Gans. After the demise of the satirical print in the 1830s he turned his hand to portraiture in the form of miniatures. Five have been identified to date (2011.)

He also exhibited paintings and drawings at the Society of British Artists and the New Watercolour Society 1832-7. He co-operated with Alfred Crowquill (pseud. of Alfred Henry Forester 1804-72) in Geo William Reynolds "Pickwick Abroad, or a Tour in France" 1838, illustrated with 41 steel engravings by A Crowquill and John Phillips, and 33 woodcuts by Bonner. For Thomas Tegg, at 73 Cheapside, 1839'.

== Punch magazine ==
Phillips worked as an illustrator in the first edition of Punch. Several series of etchings by him exist. 'Merry Thoughts for Merry Moments' pub C.S. Arnold, Tavistock Street, Covent Garden. 1829; 'Characteristic Sketches of the London Club Houses' (4) pub by G. Humphrey, St James Street, Westminster, July 3, 1829; 'Itinerant Characters Drawn & Etched from the life', in 6 plates illustrating the trades and occupations of the humblest classes in the metropolis, published by Wm Darton of Holborn Hill (nd. Circa 1829.) [There were likely to be more than 7 of these as the editor has 7. They were often published in sets of 10 or 12.]; 'Familiar Life' pub Tilt & Bogue, Fleet St. (nd), and many others. In 1842 Edward Landells found him work at “The Illustrated London News” as a scene painter.

Phillips died in St George's Hospital, Grosvenor Place, London on 28 February 1847, aged 39, of an apoplectic fit with complications.His occupation is given as 'Painter'.[GRO Death certificate March 1847 Vol 1 page 19.]
