= Jack Phillips =

Jack Phillips may refer to:

- Jack Phillips (wireless operator) (1887–1912), senior wireless operator on the RMS Titanic
- Jack Phillips (first baseman) (1921–2009), Major League Baseball first baseman
- Jack Phillips (pitcher) (1919–1958), Major League Baseball pitcher
- Jack Phillips (footballer, born 1903) (1903–1985), Welsh footballer
- Jack Phillips (footballer, born 1993), English footballer
- Jack Phillips, party in Masterpiece Cakeshop v. Colorado Civil Rights Commission

== See also ==
- John Phillips (disambiguation)
