= Herbert Watkins =

English photographer

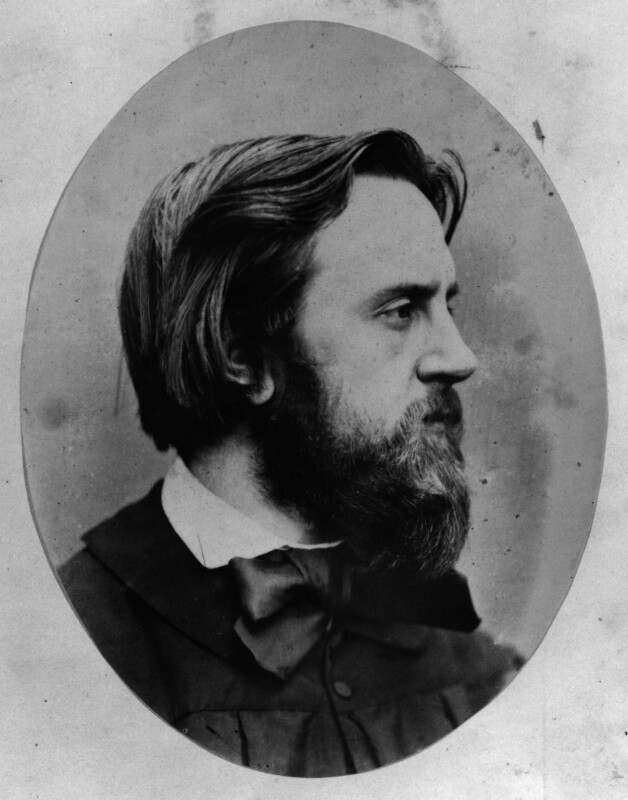
- Self portrait of Watkins
- Born: 12 July 1828; Worcester, England
- Died: 1916 (aged 87–88)
- Occupation: Photographer

George Herbert Watkins (12 July 1828 – 1916) was an English portrait photographer.

== Biography ==
George Herbert Watkins was born on 12 July 1828 in Worcester, England. He opened his studio in London in the mid-1850s. He published a series of portraits with printed biographies, titled "National Gallery of Photographic Portraits". Watkins took a famous picture of Charles Dickens sitting at his desk.

Watkins pioneered mixed media photo-caricature carte de visites. He died in 1916. He has a display at the National Portrait Gallery. He has 193 portraits in total at the gallery.
