= John Philipps =

John Philipps may refer to:

- John Philipps (cricketer) (1808–1876), English cricketer
- Sir John Philipps, 1st Baronet (died 1629) was a Welsh landowner and politician
- Sir John Philipps, 4th Baronet (c.1666–1737) was a Welsh landowner, politician and philanthropist
- Sir John Philipps, 6th Baronet (c.1701–1764), Welsh Jacobite politician
- John Philipps, 1st Viscount St Davids (1860–1938), British Liberal politician
