= Adeline Billington =

English actress and teacher (1826–1917)

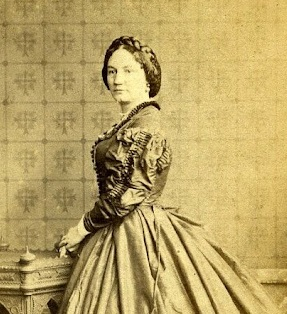
- Adeline Billington
- Born: Adeline Mortimer; 3 January 1826; England
- Died: 23 January 1917 (aged 91); London, England
- Other names: Mrs. John Billington
- Spouse: John Billington

Adeline Billington (3 January 1826 – 23 January 1917) was an English actress and teacher.

== Biography ==
Adeline Mortimer was born 3 January 1826, in England. She married John Billington, a fellow actor. Billington made her London debut in Cupid and Psyche at the Adelphi Theatre. She worked in that theatre for 16 years. She often worked with her husband. Billington was popular with Charles Dickens for several of her performances in the theatrical performances of his works. Billington was friends with Vaughan Williams as well. Billington also worked as an acting teacher, knowns as "Mother of the stage".

She died in London on 23 January 1917 and was buried with her husband in Highgate Cemetery. The grave, which is unmarked, is immediately behind the grave of the comedian George Honey.
