= John George Phillips (businessman) =

American businessman

John George Phillips (1888–1964) was an American businessman who was president of IBM.

When Phillips became vice chairman of the board and head of the executive committee, he was succeeded by Tom Watson Jr. Phillips retired in 1952.
