= Watts Phillips =

British illustrator, dramatist and novelist [1825–1874)

Watts Phillips (16 November 1825 – 2 December 1874) was an English illustrator, novelist and playwright, known for his play The Dead Heart, which served as a model for Charles Dickens' A Tale of Two Cities.

In a memoir, his sister Emma recalled that he had "many difficulties: in his life" and waged "a gallant struggle against chequered fortune." She described him as a "bright and buoyant character", "a really brilliant, energetic man, who had many gifts and accomplishments, with a cheerful, undaunted spirit, which to the last helped him to encounter trials, and a vein of humour which was as much at the service of his friends as it was to that of the public." Emma also noted that "at times he sank into fits of despondency, from which he suffered much."

A friend wrote of him that, "Few men were quicker of temper, more bitter and sarcastic in anger – and very few were so ready to forget and forgive…he could never sleep after a quarrel…until there had been a reconciliation."

== Life ==
Watts Phillips was born in Hoxton in the East End of London, U.K., the second son of Esther Ann Watts and Thomas Phillips, a timber merchant and upholsterer. He was the grand nephew of Giles Firman Phillips, a watercolour artist of some repute, familiarly known as 'Twilight' Phillips from a series of paintings depicting various landscapes at twilight.

Phillips initially sought a career on the stage. After becoming acquainted with well-known figures of the theatre world, such as John Baldwin Buckstone and Mrs. Nesbitt, he began acting in Edinburgh, eventually playing roles at the Sadler's Wells Theatre in London.

Acting did not pay well and, at the urging of his father, Phillips trained to be an illustrator under George Cruikshank, who remained a friend for the rest of his life. Phillips also studied oil painting and was a fellow student of Holman Hunt. Through Cruikshank and his theatre connections, Phillips became acquainted with Samuel Phelps, Robert Barnabas Brough and his family, Augustus Mayhew and his brother Henry Mayhew, Albert Richard Smith, Douglas Jerrold and Mark Lemon.

He moved to Paris to study art, but fled to Brussels on the outbreak of the Revolutions of 1848, narrowly escaping some revolutionaries who, on hearing of an Englishman residing in Paris, fired their muskets through the door of his lodgings.

Returning to London in 1849, he found work as an illustrator with David Bogue, a publisher.

In 1851, he married the daughter of a stockbroker, Mary Elizabeth Mariner. Phillips separated from his wife a few years later on the grounds that she "made my life a misery on account of her ungovernable and most wicked temper." Elizabeth settled in Wales and Phillips referred to her in his letters as the "old Wreck Ashore." He formed a relationship with Caroline Huskisson in Paris and had four children.

Except for occasional sojourns in England, Phillips lived in Paris, where he found ready work supplying illustrations for lithographers and as an occasional foreign correspondent for English papers. He lived "a gay Boulevard life" immersed in the French literary, artistic and theatre world, becoming friends with Alexandre Dumas, Victor Hugo and others.

By 1861, overwork and a dissipated lifestyle began to tell on his health. He suffered from chronic indigestion, headaches and pains of all kinds, sometimes being confined to bed for weeks at a time and forced to relinquish lucrative assignments.

In 1866, he returned to England, where he remained for the rest of his life. Phillips retired to Edenbridge in Kent until 1870, when he moved to Brompton, London, an area known at the time as an artists' quarter. Despite declining health, he continued writing at his usual feverish pace.

After a long illness, Phillips died at his home. He stated in his will that he did not want any of his property "falling into the hands of the woman Elizabeth Phillips known as Lilly Phillips and of her child Basil of whom I am not the father and also of any other children she has had or may have by other men."

His daughter, (May) Roland Watts Phillips, went on the stage, making her debut at the Lyceum Theatre, London, in 1879. She went to Australia, where she had a career on the stage and in early films, dying in New South Wales in 1929.

== Early career ==
While providing cartoons under the name The Ragged Philosopher for the weekly paper Diogenes, a short-lived rival to Punch, he began writing satirical sketches of London life and wrote a book about the London slums, The Wild Tribes of London (1855), which was dramatised by Travers and successfully staged in London and Manchester. Phillips began writing his own plays, such as Joseph Chavigny, The Poor Strollers and The Dead Heart. Joseph Chavigny was accepted by Benjamin Webster and performed at the Adelphi Theatre with Webster playing the lead.

While critically acclaimed, Joseph Chavigny and The Poor Strollers were not popular with the audience who were used to the farces and melodramas performed at the Adelphi and did not take to Phillips' terse, epigrammatic dialogue. Webster delayed the production of The Dead Heart, but the appearance of the first instalments of Charles Dickens' A Tale of Two Cities, serialised in Dickens' magazine All the Year Round, prompted Webster to put The Dead Heart on the stage in 1859. The play was a great success, Queen Victoria and Prince Albert seeing it twice.

== Charges of plagiarism ==
There were many similarities between The Dead Heart and A Tale of Two Cities, and there was talk of plagiarism. However, the drama critic for The Athenaeum, Joseph Knight, revealed that Webster had read the play to a few friends in Brighton in 1857. Dickens was in attendance, while he was performing in an amateur production of The Frozen Deep, by Wilkie Collins.

When a dramatisation of A Tale of Two Cities was mounted at the Lyceum by Madame Celeste in January 1860, Phillips' friend, Mr. Coleman, wrote, "society divided itself into two factions – the Celestites and Dickensites, the Websterites and Phillipsites. Then came accusations and recriminations as to coincidences and plagiarisms, and bad blood arose on both sides." Phillips, who was unaware at the time that Dickens was familiar with his play, was devastated by the situation, writing to Webster that he found it "very heartbreaking." The rancour eventually dissipated: while in London in 1865, Phillips met Dickens who invited him to a Theatrical Fund Dinner.

== Later career ==
After the success of The Dead Heart, Phillips became a very popular playwright, although often to mixed critical reviews. He wrote profusely and in 1861 had plays scheduled to appear at the Olympic Theatre, St James's Theatre, the Adelphi Theatre and Drury Lane.

A first novel, The Honour of the Family, was serialised in Town Talk (1862) and afterwards dramatised as Amos Clark. Phillips contributed several serialised novels to the Family Herald, The London Journal, and other periodicals under the name Fairfax Balfour.

Circumstances turned against him – in the form of illness or bankruptcy of managers, unavailability of actors or theatres, unfounded charges that he took his plots from French originals, the public taste for 'sensation' drama – and he began to experience disappointments. By 1865, he had ten plays in circulation, but not produced. Theodora was staged in 1866 to a disheartening reception.

His fortunes improved and in 1869 he had four plays in performance at the same time. Two more were produced in 1870, both failures. In 1870, he returned to London to supervise rehearsals for his play On the Jury, which proved to be one of his successes, followed by the well-received Amos Clark, and finally, a successful revival of Lost in London.

A revival of The Dead Heart, revised by Walter Herries Pollock, was staged to great acclaim by Henry Irving at the Lyceum in 1889.

== Major plays ==
- Joseph Chavigny (1855)
- The Poor Strollers (1856)
- The Dead Heart (1857)
- Paper Wings (1860)
- His Last Victory (1862)
- A Woman in Mauve (1865)
- The Huguenot Captain (1866)
- Lost in London (1867)
- Nobody's Child (1868)
- Maud's Peril (1867)
- Amos Clark (1872)

== Selected novels ==
- The Honour of the Family (1862)
- Ida Lee; Or, the Child of the Wreck (1864)
- The League of Crime; Or, The Twelve Temptations
