= John Phillip (poet) =

English author in the 16th century

John Phillip (fl.1561) was an English poet and dramatist of the Elizabethan era.

He is known for his play The Commodye of Pacient and Meeke Grissill (AKA The Plaie of Pacient Grisell), said to have been written in the late 1550s, and possibly first performed by a children's company at Nonsuch Palace in Surrey for Queen Elizabeth I as part of a special entertainment in August 1559. It is based on a tale from Boccaccio's Decameron, which features also in Chaucer's Canterbury Tales: that of patient Griselda, who displays continuing devotion to her husband despite his brutal attempts to test her loyalty. The play was registered with the Stationers' Company in July 1565 and July 1568.

His name also appears as John Phillipp in the quarto of The Play of Patient Grisell. He is thought to be the John Philip, John Phillip or John Phillips who wrote ballads, tracts and elegies between 1566 and 1591.

The lullaby "Be still, my sweet sweeting" from The Play of Patient Grisell (lines 1383–98) has been set to music several times:

- Peter Warlock – "Cradle Song" (1927)
- Benjamin Britten – "The Nurse's Song" in the song cycle A Charm of Lullabies, Op. 41 (1947)
- Jack Gibbons – "Cradle Song", Op. 64 (2005)
