= Henry Neville (actor) =

English actor, dramatist, teacher and theatre manager

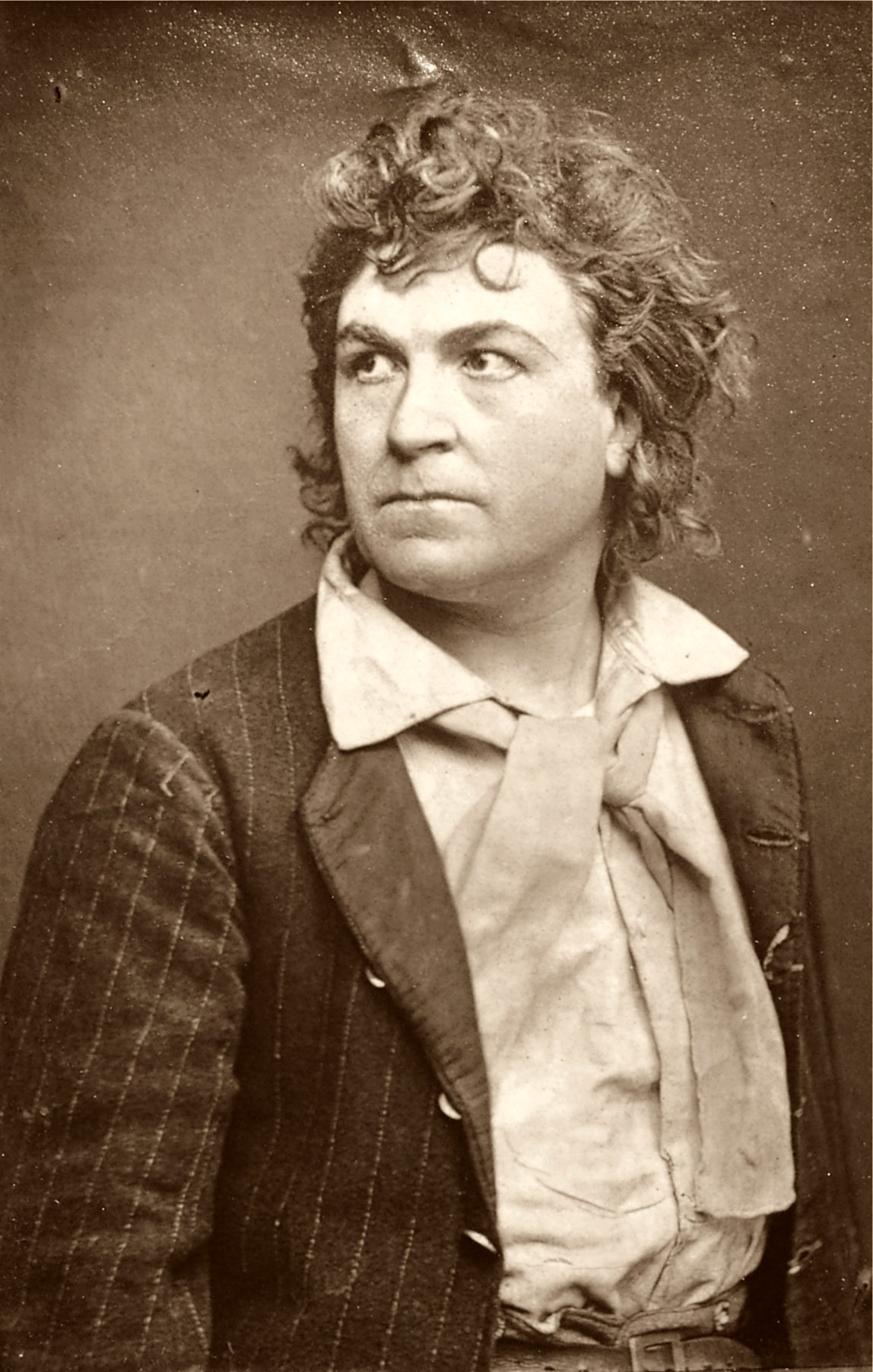
Henry Neville

Thomas Henry Gartside Neville (20 June 1837 – 19 June 1910) was an English actor, dramatist, teacher and theatre manager. He began his career playing dashing juvenile leads, later specialising in Shakespearean roles, modern comedy and melodrama. His most famous role was as Bob Brierley in Tom Taylor's The Ticket-of-Leave Man. As the manager of the Olympic Theatre from 1873 to 1879, he presented numerous successful productions. In later years, he became a respected character actor.

== Biography ==
=== Early years ===
Neville was born in Manchester, England, son of John Garside Neville and his second wife Mary Anna, née Gartside (died 1895). He was the twentieth child of his father, an actor and the manager of Queen's Theatre, Spring Gardens, Manchester, who himself was the twentieth child of his father. Though Neville senior was in the theatre, there were strong military traditions on both sides of the family, and John Neville was opposed to his son's decision to pursue a theatrical rather than a military career and refused to help him. Neville had one brother, George (born c. 1839), one sister, Josaphine (c. 1838–1895), and nineteen half-brothers and sisters.

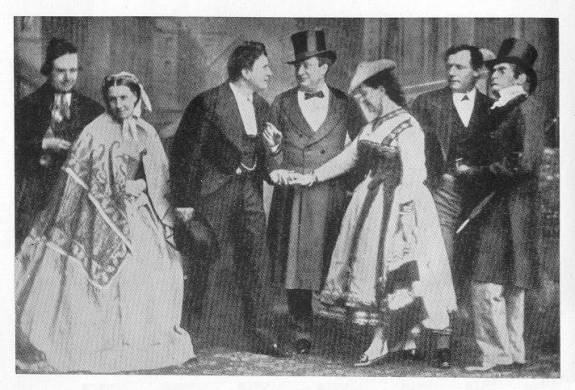
No Thoroughfare (1868) by Charles Dickens and Wilkie Collins. Neville is third from left.

From 1857 to 1860 Neville acted in the English provinces and Scotland. When the tragedian John Vandenhoff made his farewell performance in 1858 at the Theatre Royal, Liverpool, Neville played Cromwell to Vandenhoff's Wolsey in Shakespeare's King Henry VIII. He made his London debut in 1860 as Percy Ardent in Dion Boucicault's The Irish Heiress at the Lyceum Theatre. The Observer said of his performance: "Mr Henry Neville, a new importation from Liverpool, was gentlemanly and easy, of good manners and dashing appearance; and he promises to fill a dreary gap in the London theatrical world – the line of jeunes premières." He attracted further good notices for his next role, in The Love Chase, receiving encouragement from The Times "as a representative of young men of something like rank and position." The same year, he played Victor Savignie in Arrienne at the Lyceum and, at the Olympic Theatre, he played Ivan in Serf and Valjean in an adaptation of Les Misérables.

In May 1863, still at the Olympic, Neville created the role of Bob Brierley in Tom Taylor's drama about the dismal life of a released convict, The Ticket-of-Leave Man, a character in which he made the success of his career. He played in its long first run and revivals for a total of about 2000 performances. In 1865, he played the title role in Taylor's Henry Dunbar at the Olympic opposite Kate Terry, and in 1867 was her chosen Romeo to her Juliet in her farewell London performances at the Adelphi Theatre. 1867 had been a busy year for Neville at the Adelphi, where he played Job Arnroyd in Lost in London, Benedick in Much Ado About Nothing, Dunbar again, Farmer Allan in Dora, Richard Watt in His First Champagne, Claude Meinotee in Lady of Lyons, Walter Maidenblush in Little Treasure, Sir Thomas Clifford in Hunchback, and George Vendale in No Thoroughfare, another notable success. The next year at the Adelphi, he played the title role in Hamlet and repeated Robert Brierley. In 1869, still at the Adelphi, he portrayed the role of Vernon Wainwright in Eve. At the Gaiety Theatre in the same year, he played an important role in W. S. Gilbert's early comedy, An Old Score.

=== Actor-manager ===
1875 Revival of The Ticket-of-Leave Man, starring Neville and Nellie Farren

Neville continued building his reputation on the London stage in the 1870s as actor and also as the manager of the Olympic Theatre from 1873 to 1879, where his company included rising actors such as Rutland Barrington, Helen Ernstone, Emily Fowler and Johnston Forbes-Robertson. In 1870, he played Henry Little in Put Yourself in His Place at the Adelphi. In 1872 he had a great success in The School for Scandal of which The Times said, "Mr Henry Neville is the leading actor in the class of characters in which Charles Surface is comprised." This was followed, at the Olympic, by The School for Intrigue, in which he played the part of Almaviva. Other successes during the 1870s, both as manager and actor, included his portrayal of Lord Clancarty in Taylor's Lady Clancarty, Pierre in John Oxenford's The Two Orphans in 1874, an 1874–75 revival of The Ticket-of-Leave Man, and Franklin Blake in a dramatisation of Wilkie Collins's The Moonstone in 1877. In the same year he produced and starred in a revival of Lady Audley's Secret by Robert Walters. He also produced W. S. Gilbert's plays The Ne'er-do-Weel in 1878 and Gretchen in 1879.

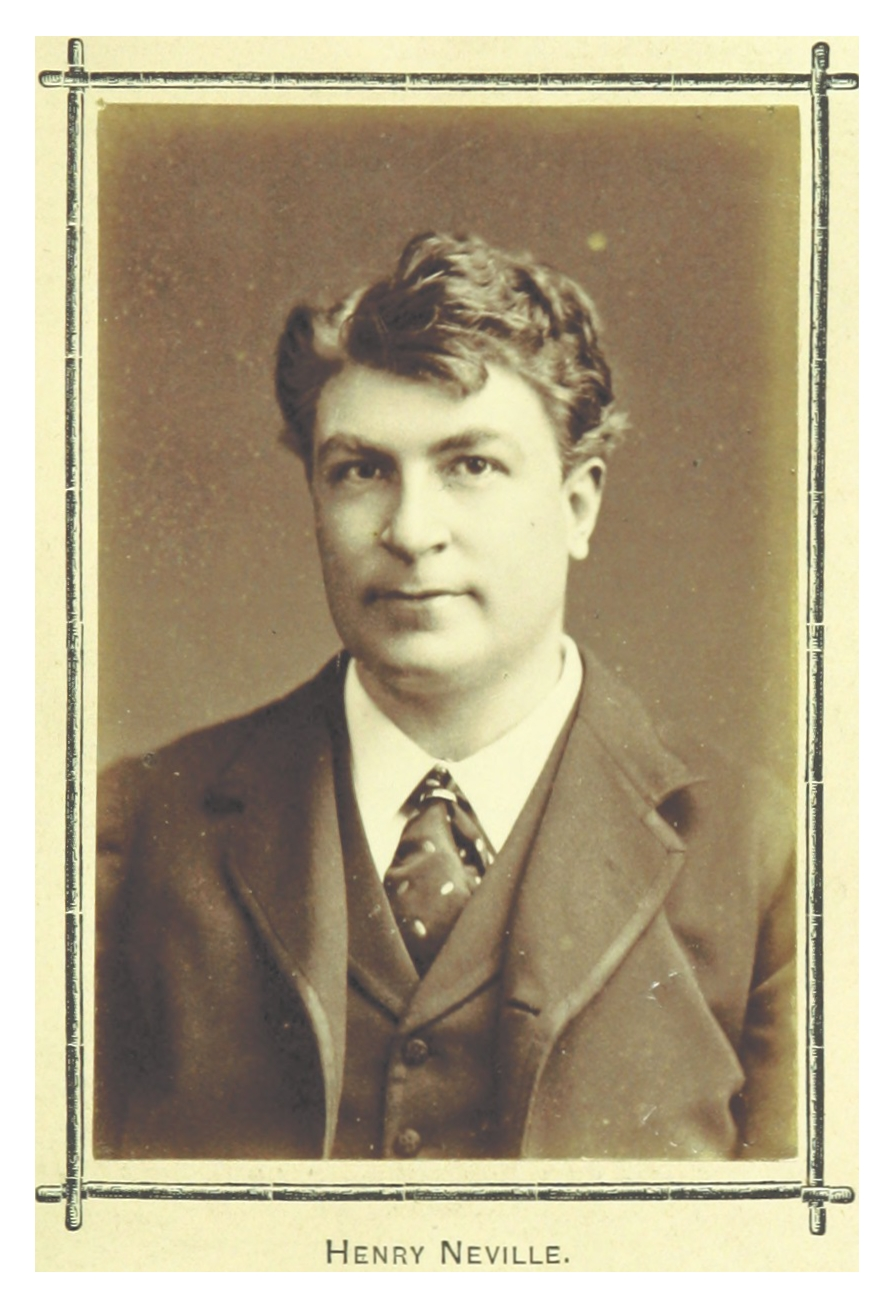
Henry Neville (1877)

In 1878, Neville opened a successful drama school which he managed for many years. By the 1880s, he had become famous in melodrama roles, playing the romantic lead. His Shakespeare roles included Jaques in As You Like It, produced by Madame Modjeska (1882) and Leonato in Much Ado About Nothing. In 1888, he played Count Heidegger in Handsome Is that Handsome Does, a comedy by C. J. Ribton Turner at the Vaudeville Theatre. At the Olympic that year, he reprised the role Pierre in The Two Orphans and appeared in Hands Across the Sea by Henry Pettitt.

=== Later years ===
In 1890, Neville went to America with Augustus Harris's company, appearing for 200 nights as Captain Temple in Human Nature, renamed The Soudan for its U.S. production. On his return to England he resumed his successful place in the autumn melodramas at the Theatre Royal, Drury Lane.

The last phase of Neville's career was with Herbert Beerbohm Tree's company at His Majesty's Theatre, where his roles included Leonato and, in Richard II, John of Gaunt. His last engagement was in Tree's revival of The School for Scandal in 1909. By this stage in his career, Neville had moved to the role of Sir Oliver Surface, with Robert Loraine in Neville's old role as Sir Oliver's nephew, Charles. The Manchester Guardian found Neville "admirably sonorous" in the part. The Observer wrote: "the weighty Sir Oliver of Mr Henry Neville, so well remembered as the dashing Charles Surface of thirty years ago, is exactly in tune with the quietly humorous Moses of Mr Lionel Brough".

Neville wrote six plays, all melodramas. He also published some short books on the theatre, entitled The Stage, its Past and Present, in Relation to Fine Art; Gesture; Her First Appearance; and His First and Last Benefit,

Neville died at Seaford, Sussex, one day short of his 73rd birthday, of a heart attack induced by a minor accident and was buried at Christ Church in Denshaw, Saddleworth, Yorkshire. He left four sons, from his marriage to Harriet Jane Waddell (c. 1837–1903). The Times concluded its obituary notice of Neville: "He had troops of friends, and there are not two opinions as to his reputation for fair dealing with his fellow men. As well as an actor, he was a man of business, with a fund of common sense, fond of sport, and a glutton for outdoor exercise. He was well known as a Freemason and generally respected by all with whom he was associated, and beloved by those who knew him intimately."
