= John Billington (actor) =

English actor (1828–1904)

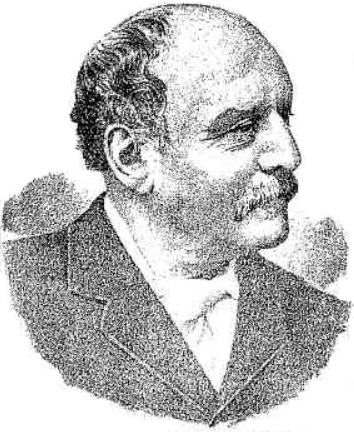
- Illustration in The Lorgnette, 26 April 1890
- Born: 31 August 1828; Goole, East Riding of Yorkshire, England
- Died: 8 September 1904 (aged 76); London, England
- Occupation: Actor
- Spouse: Adeline Mortimer
- Parents: Thomas Billington (father); Ann Duckles (mother)

John Billington (31 August 1828 – 8 September 1904) was an English actor, for many years a member of the company of the Adelphi Theatre in London.

== Life ==
=== Adelphi Theatre ===
Through his appearances outside London, Billington acquired the reputation of being a painstaking and efficient actor. He first appeared in London in April 1857, at the Adelphi Theatre in the play Like and Unlike. He remained a member of the theatre company, under the management of Benjamin Webster, until 1868.

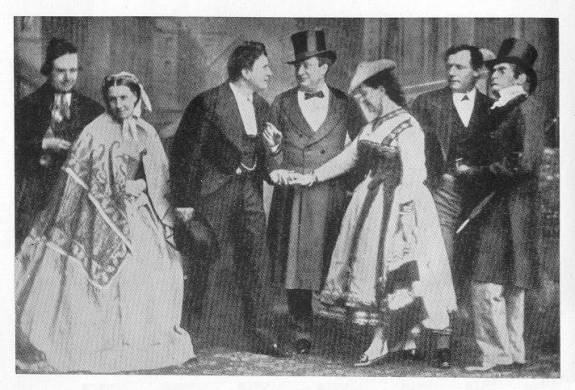
A scene from No Thoroughfare (1868); Billington, as Walter Wilding, is second from right.

During this time he appeared in most of the original performances of notable plays. Such roles included Walter in The Poor Strollers by Watts Phillips in January 1858; Frederick Wardour in Tom Taylor's The House or the Home in May 1859; Hardress Cregan in The Colleen Bawn by Dion Boucicault in September 1860; George Peyton in Boucicault's The Octoroon in November 1861; Ned Plummer in Dot, dramatized by Boucicault from Charles Dickens's The Cricket on the Hearth, in April 1862; in March 1863 John Mellish in Aurora Floyd, dramatized by Benjamin Webster; and in December 1867 Walter Wilding in No Thoroughfare by Charles Dickens and Wilkie Collins.

=== Later career ===
After leaving the Adelphi he played leading roles in London and elsewhere. In October 1871 at the Olympic Theatre he appeared as Sir Percival Clyde in the first performance of a stage version of Wilkie Collins's novel The Woman in White. At the Adelphi he appeared in Rough and Ready by Paul Meritt. In July 1875 he became manager of the Globe Theatre for a season, and produced Rough and Ready and Benjamin Webster's comedy The Hen and Chickens.

In 1880 at the Gaiety Theatre he appeared as Ione Hessel in the original performance of Quicksands by William Archer. In 1890, in New Zealand with John Lawrence Toole, he appeared in plays including Dot, Morris Barnett's The Serious Family and John Poole's Paul Pry.

Billington died in London on 8 September 1904 and was buried at Highgate Cemetery. The grave, which is unmarked, is immediately behind the grave of the comedian George Honey.

== Family ==
Oldest son of Thomas Billington (1803-1836) and Ann Duckles (1803-1863). Thomas was a builder originally from Wakefield, the family lived on South street, Goole. A niece of John Billington married Tivadar Nachéz.

Billington married Adeline Mortimer; they often appeared together at the Adelphi Theatre, where she was a member of the company from 1858 to 1868.
