= Benjamin Nottingham Webster =

English actor-manager and dramatist

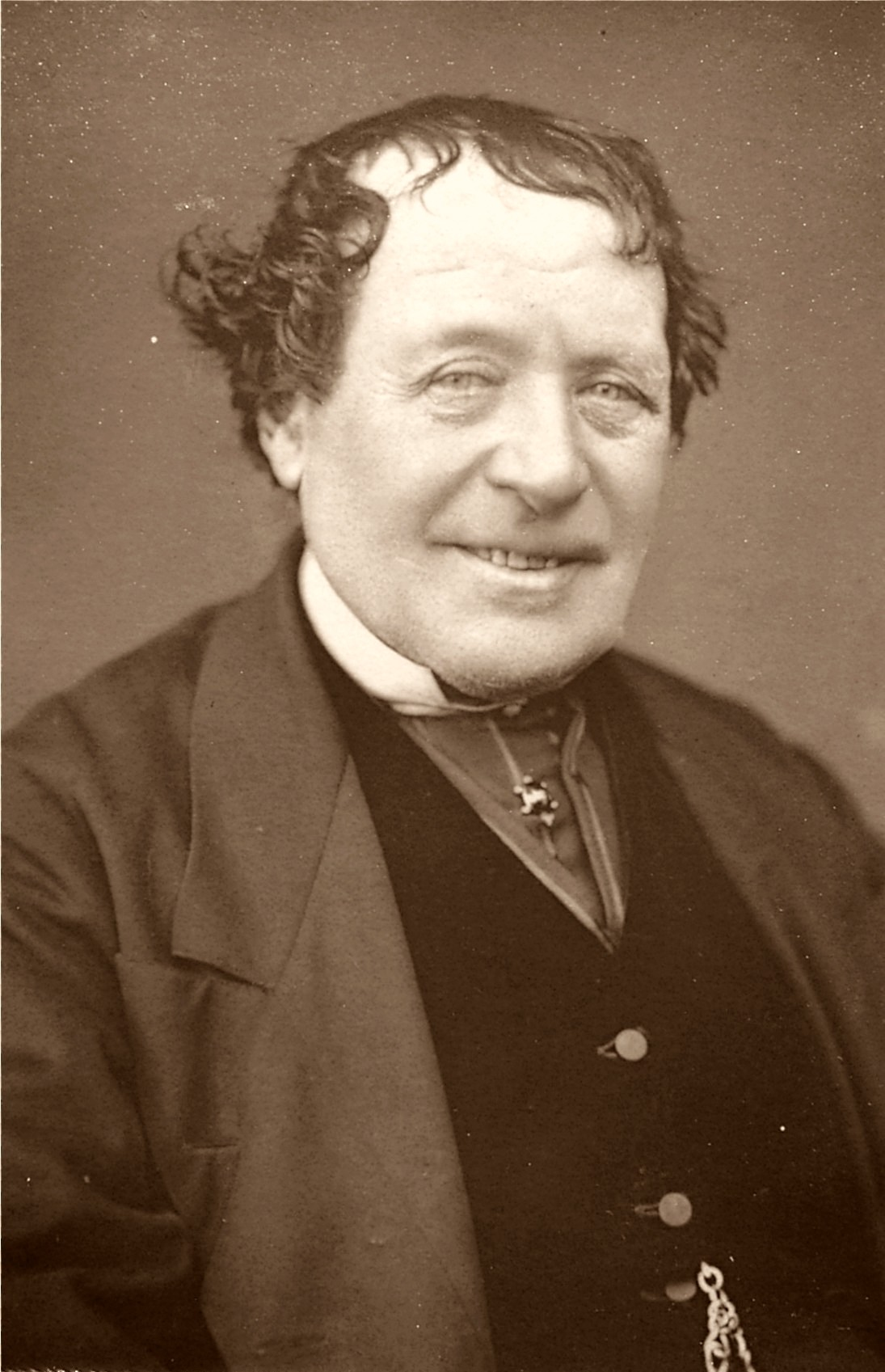
- Born: 3 September 1797; Bath, England
- Died: 3 July 1882 (aged 84)
- Resting place: Brompton Cemetery, London
- Occupations: Actor, dramatist
- Relatives: Ben Webster (grandson); Margaret Webster (great-granddaughter)

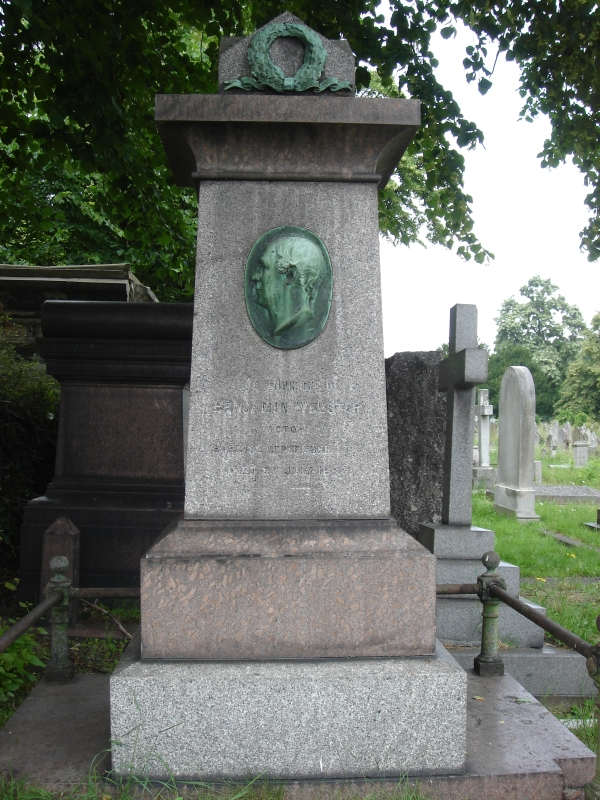
Funerary monument, Brompton Cemetery, London

Benjamin Nottingham Webster (3 September 1797 – 3 July 1882) was an English actor-manager and dramatist.

== Early life ==
Webster was born in Bath, the son of a dancing master.

== Career ==
First appearing as Harlequin, and then in small parts at Drury Lane, he went to the Haymarket Theatre in 1829, and was given leading comedy character business.

Webster was the lessee of the Haymarket from 1837 to 1853; he built the new Adelphi Theatre (1859); later the Olympic Theatre, Princess's Theatre, London and St James's Theatres came under his control; and he was the patron of all the contemporary playwrights and many of the best actors, who owed their opportunity of success to him. He wrote, translated or adapted nearly a hundred plays.

As a character actor he was unequalled in his day, especially in such parts as Triplet in Masks and Faces, Joey Ladle in No Thoroughfare, and John Peerybingle in his own dramatization of The Cricket on the Hearth.

Webster took his formal farewell of the stage in 1874.

== Later life ==
Webster died in 1882, and is buried in Brompton Cemetery, London. The grave lies 10m east of the main path, midway between the north entrance and the colonnades on an east–west path.

== Personal life ==
His daughter, Harriette Georgiana (died 1897), was the first wife of Edward Levy-Lawson, 1st Baron Burnham.

His son, W.S. Webster, had three children – Benjamin Webster (b. 1864; married to Miss (Dame) May Whitty), Annie (Mrs A.E. George) and Lizzie (Mrs Sydney Brough) – all well known on the London stage, and further connected with it in each case by marriage.
