= Edward Wright =

Edward Wright may refer to:

- Edward Wright (mathematician) (1561–1615), English mathematician and cartographer
- Edward Wright (principal) (c. 1605–1683) Principal of Glasgow University
- Edward Wright (artist) (1912–1988), painter, typographer and graphic designer
- Edward Wright (Medal of Honor) (1829–1901), American Civil War sailor and Medal of Honor recipient
- Edward L. Wright (born 1947), American astrophysicist and cosmologist
- Edward Fortescue Wright (1858–1904), English cricketer
- Edward George Wright (1831–1902), New Zealand engineer and politician
- Edward Percival Wright (1834–1910), Irish ophthalmic surgeon, botanist and zoologist
- E. M. Wright (1906–2005), English mathematician
- Gordon Wright (footballer) (Edward Gordon Dundas Wright, 1884–1947), English footballer
- Bearcat Wright (Edward Wright, 1932–1982), African-American professional wrestler
- Edward Wright (Lancashire cricketer), cricket player in the 1840s
- Edward Wright (cricketer, born 1945), former English cricketer
- Edward Wright (cricketer, born 1874) (1874–1947), English cricketer
- Edward Wright (sailor) (born 1977), British sailor
- Edward Richard Wright (1813–1859), English comedian and actor
- Edward W. Wright (1817–1866), American pastor
- Edward Herbert Wright (1863–1930), American politician and political activist
- Dr Edward Wright, early settler in Adelaide, who arrived on the Cygnet in the 1836 First Fleet of South Australia

== See also ==
- Ed Wright (disambiguation)
- Edgar Wright (born 1974), British director, screenwriter, producer, and actor
