= William Henry Oxberry =

English actor (1808–1852)

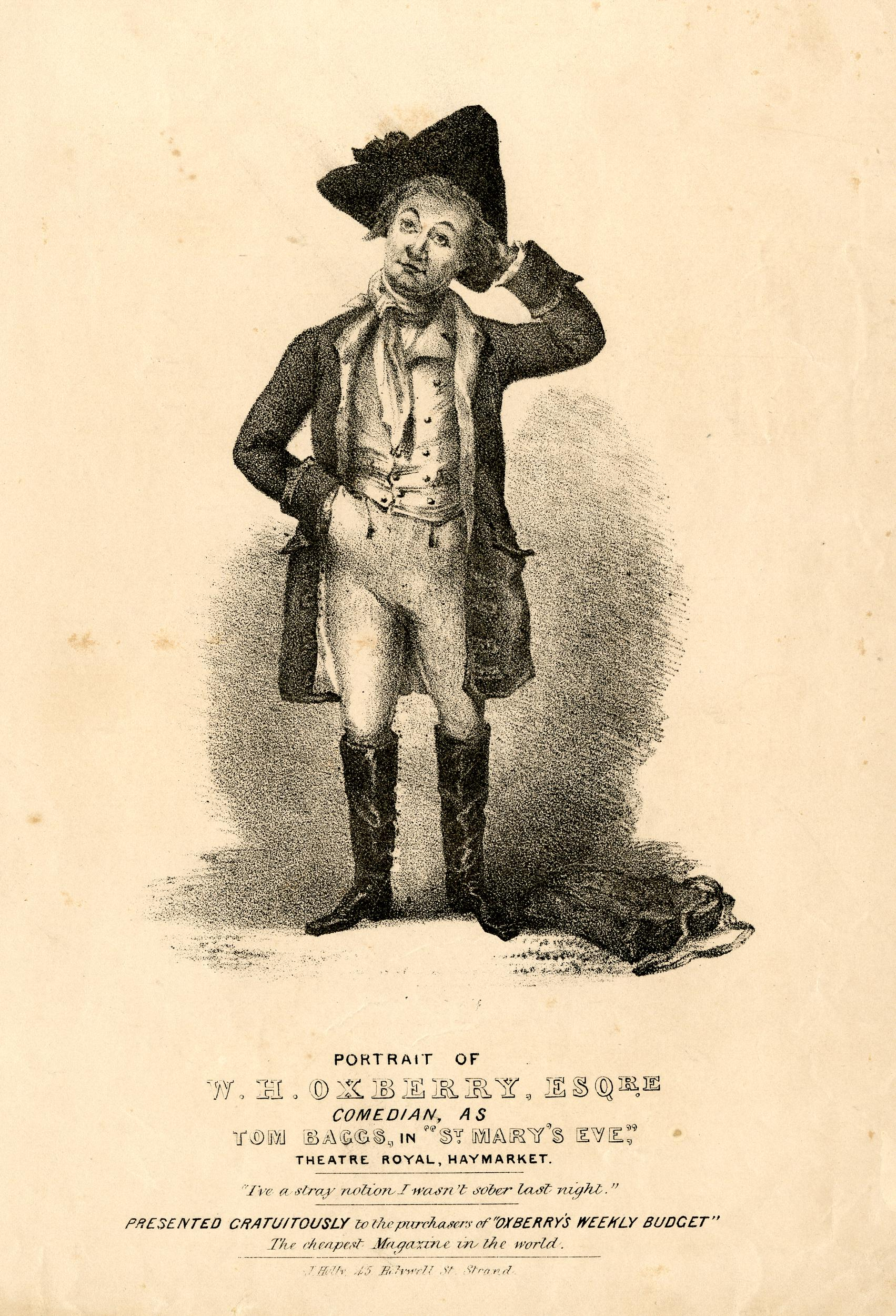
Oxberry as Tom Baggs in St Mary's Eve by Bayle Bernard

William Henry Oxberry (21 April 1808 – 29 February 1852) was an English actor, appearing at many London theatres, particularly in comic roles. He wrote many plays and burlesques.

== Life ==
Oxberry was born in 1808, son of William Oxberry, the actor and publisher. He received his early education at Merchant Taylors' School, which he entered in 1816. At a school in Kentish Town, kept by a Mr Patterson, he received some training in acting. On leaving there his education was continued under John Clarke, the author of Ravenna, and the Rev. R. Nixon. First placed in his father's printing office, he became afterwards, like him, "the pupil of an eminent artist". He was then apprenticed to Septimus Wray, a surgeon of Salisbury Square, where he remained until his father's death.

=== Early career ===
He made his first professional appearance at the Olympic Theatre on the occasion of the benefit of his stepfather William Leman Rede, in March 1825, as Sam Swipes, John Liston's part in Exchange no Robbery. He was then employed by Leigh Hunt, the editor of The Examiner, but soon returned to the stage, playing in Chelmsford, Hythe, Manchester, and Sheffield, and joining Hammond's company at York and Hull. In the autumn of 1832 he acted at the Strand in The Loves of the Angels and The Loves of the Devils, both by Leman Rede. He went with Harriet Smithson to Paris at the close of this season, and played low-comedy parts at the Italian Opera.

=== London theatres ===
Returning to England, he accepted a four years' engagement at the Lyceum Theatre, of which, with disastrous effect upon his fortunes, he became manager. He was subsequently at the Princess's Theatre. In the autumn of 1841 he succeeded Robert Keeley at Covent Garden, and, as "Oxberry from the Haymarket", played Flute in A Midsummer Night's Dream. In 1842 he was again at the Lyceum, appearing principally in burlesque, and winning a reputation as a comic dancer, but taking occasional parts in farce, such as Victim in John Oxenford's My Fellow Clerk. In January 1843 he was at the Princess's, playing the hero, a jealous husband, in A Lost Letter. In June he was a ridiculous old schoolmaster in John Poole's drama The Swedish Ferryman, and in September was, with Edward Richard Wright and Paul Bedford, at the Strand playing in Bombastes Furioso and The Three Graces.

Returning to the Princess's, he played with the Keeleys and Walter Lacy in William Thomas Moncrieff's farce Borrowing a Husband, and in 1844 was Wamba in the opera The Maid of Judah, a version of Ivanhoe. In February 1845 he was Sir Harry in High Life Below Stairs, and in April Verges to Charlotte Cushman's Beatrice in Much Ado About Nothing. In July he was the original Mrs Caudle to the Mr Caudle of Henry Compton in Mr and Mrs Caudle. He was under the Vestris management at Covent Garden. There were few theatres at which he was not seen, and he managed for a time the Windsor Theatre.

=== Death ===
Up to his death he was, with Charles Mathews and Mme Vestris, playing in A Game of Speculation and The Prince of Happy Land. Having lung disease, he died on 29 February 1852. In a will, printed in The Era for 21 March 1852, and written four days before he died, Oxberry left such property as he possessed to Charles Melville, a tragic actor better known in the country than in London, in trust for his children. He expressed many wishes concerning his funeral which were not observed; asked that his heart might be preserved in some medical museum as a specimen of a broken one, hoped that a benefit might be given him to pay his debts, which were moderate; and left messages of farewell to many well known actors.

Joseph Knight wrote: "A very little man, with a quaint, peculiar manner, he was a lively actor and dancer in burlesque, but was said to rarely know his part on first nights."

== Works ==
Oxberry was a member of the Dramatic Authors' Society; his numerous plays were never collected, and many of them never printed. Duncombe's collection gives The Actress of all Work, or my Country Cousin, one act; The Delusion, or Is she Mad? two acts; The Idiot Boy, a melodrama in three acts; Matteo Falcone, or the Brigand and his Son, one act; Norma Travestie; The Pasha and his Pets, or the Bear and the Monkey. These are shown in a British Museum catalogue.

Other plays assigned to him are: The Three Clerks, The Conscript, The Female Volunteer, The Ourang Outang, The Truand Chief, The First of September, The Idiot of Heidelberg, The Lion King, The Scapegrace of Paris, and very many burlesques. He claimed to have left behind thirty unacted plays, which he trusted would be given after his death for the benefit of his widow and three children, otherwise unprovided for.

Oxberry produced Oxberry's Weekly Budget of Plays, 1843–4, consisting of thirty-nine plays edited by him; and Oxberry's Dramatic Chronology (1850), announced to be continued annually.
