= J. L. Toole =

English comic actor (1830–1906)

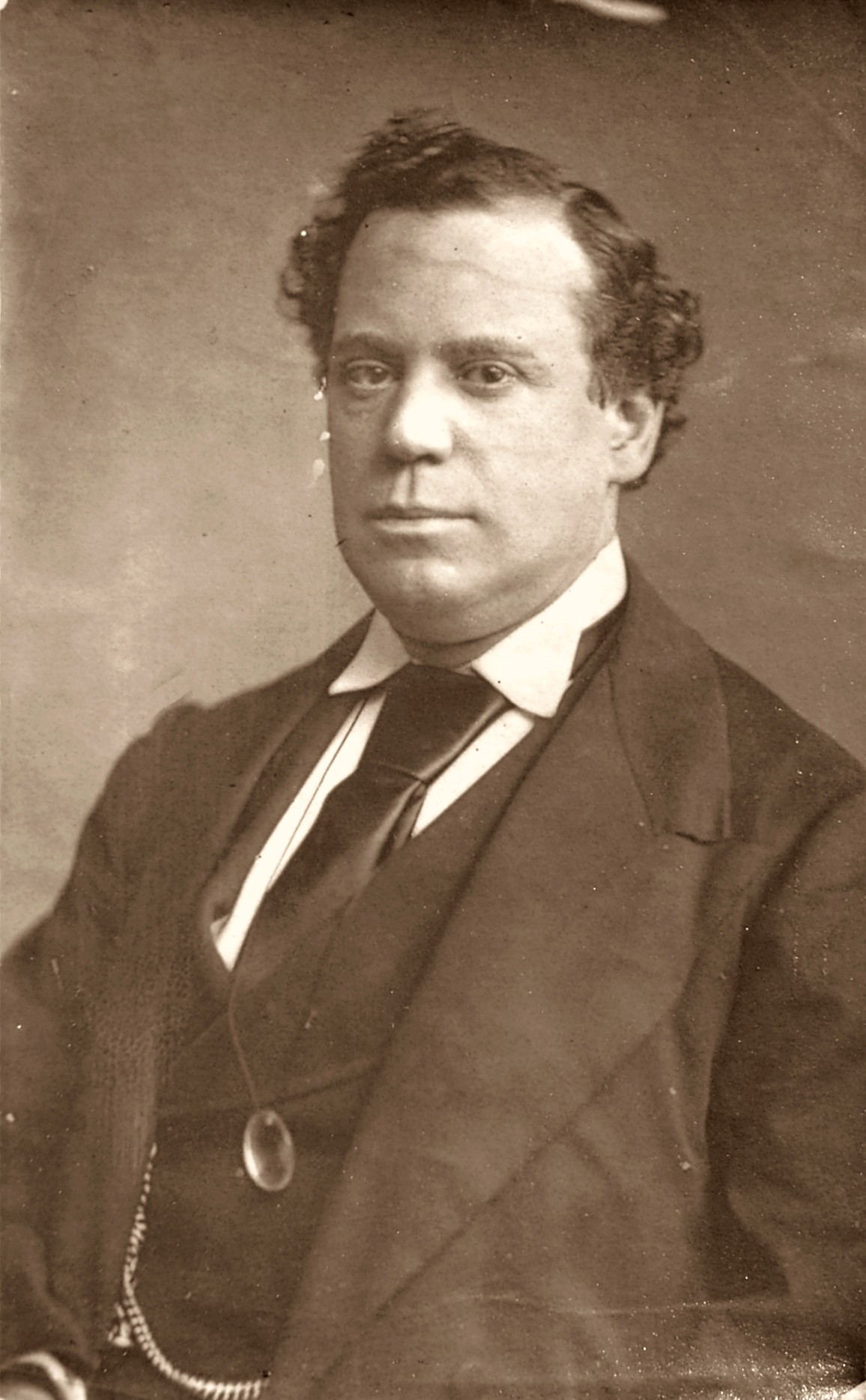
- Born: John Lawrence Toole; 12 March 1830; St Mary Axe, City of London, England
- Died: 30 July 1906 (aged 76); Brighton, Sussex, England
- Years active: 1852–1893

John Lawrence Toole (12 March 1830 – 30 July 1906) was an English comic actor, actor-manager and theatrical producer. He was famous for his roles in farce and in serio-comic melodramas, in a career that spanned more than four decades, and the first actor to have a West End theatre named after him.

== Life and career ==
Toole was born in London, the younger son of James Toole and his wife, Elizabeth. His father was a messenger for the East India Company and for some years an usher at the Old Bailey, who for many years in the 1840s acted as toastmaster in the City of London.

He was educated at the City of London School from 1841 to 1845, and started work as a clerk in a wine merchant's office. In 1854, Toole married Susan Hale (née Caslake), a widow five years older than he. They had a son, Frank Lawrence, and a daughter, Florence Mabel, but both children died in their 20s.

=== Early career ===
Toole began his acting career by training as an amateur with the City Histrionic Club, beginning in 1850 and by performing in other amateur theatricals and in comic sketches. He earned good notices, particularly as Jacob Earwig in Boots at the Swan, and soon met Charles Dickens, who had heard of him and came to see him act. His role as Simmons in The Spitalfields Weaver by Thomas Haynes Bayly at the Haymarket Theatre, on 22 July 1852 was billed as his "first appearance" on stage. Encouraged by Dickens, he appeared later that year at the Queen's Theatre in Dublin, under the management of Charles Dillon, and by 1853 became the principal "low comedian" at the Theatre Royale in Edinburgh. His older brother, Francis, acted as his manager throughout his early career. During the next two years, he performed widely in Ireland and Scotland, gaining a reputation for sunny extemporaneous comedy, humorous expressions and a uniquely comic voice, freedom with his texts, and an engaging rapport with audiences.

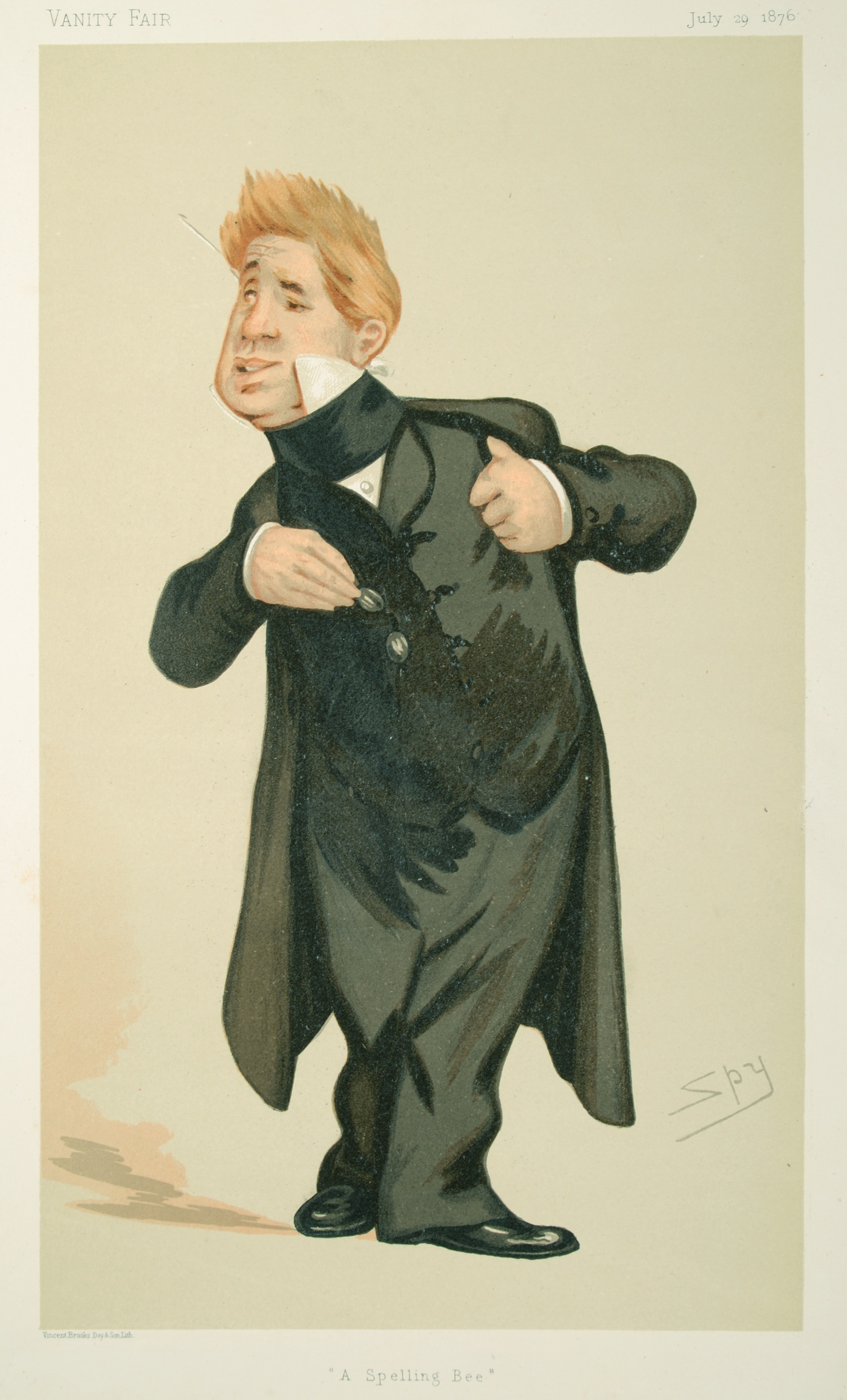
Spy cartoon of Toole titled "A Spelling Bee" (1876)

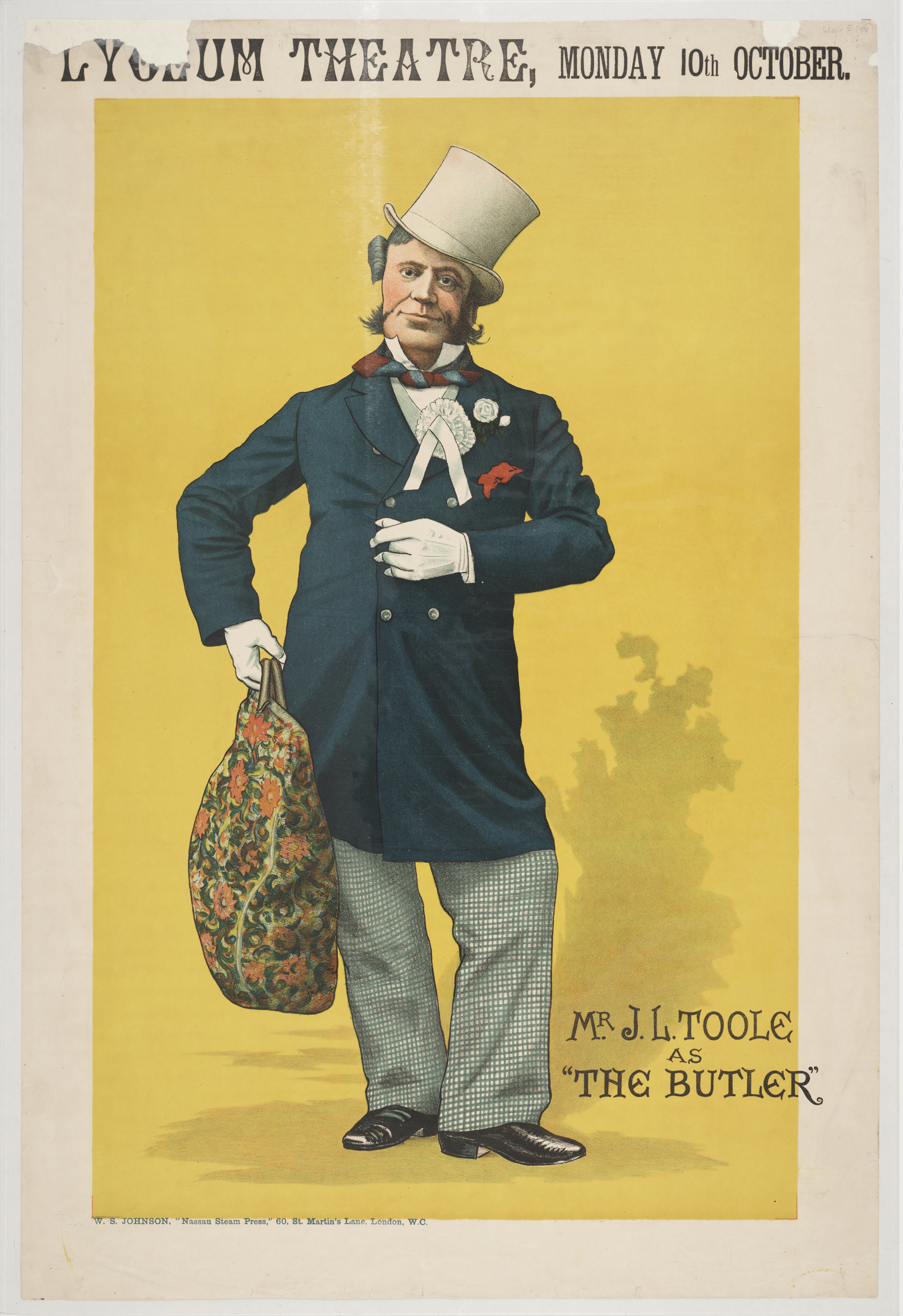
Toole in The Butler at the Lyceum Theatre, Edinburgh

In 1854, Toole made his first professional appearance in London at the St. James's Theatre, acting as Samuel Pepys in The King's Rival, by Tom Taylor and Charles Reade, and Weazel in My Friend the Major by Charles Selby. There he also played in Boots at the Swan and Honours before Titles. He returned to the provinces, but by 1856 was engaged in London at the Lyceum Theatre, including as Hilarion Fanfaronade in Belphegor, in which Marie Wilton made her first London appearance. Thereafter, he frequently performed with Wilton. In 1857, having had a great success in London as Paul Pry in John Poole's farce of that name, he made his first of many successful provincial summer tours and often repeated the character thereafter. During this first tour, he met and acted together with Henry Irving, and the two remained close friends over their long careers. In 1858, he scored a notable hit creating the role of Tom Cranky in John Hollingshead's farce The Birthplace of Podgers.

=== Peak years ===
In 1858, at the suggestion of Dickens, Toole joined Benjamin Webster's company at the Adelphi Theatre and established his popularity as a farceur, creating, among other parts, Joe Spriggins in Ici on parle français by T. H. Williams, Augustus de Rosherville in The Willow Copse by Boucicault, in Birthplace of Podgers, Tom Dibbles in Good for Nothing by J. B. Buckstone, and in Bengal Tiger. He remained at the Adelphi as principal low comedian for nine years, frequently partnering with Paul Bedford, whose sedate comic style complemented his own contrasting energetic style. His most successful roles there included Bob Cratchit in A Christmas Carol; or, Past, Present, and Future (1859), the title role in Asmodeus in 1859, Peter Familias in The Census by William Brough (among many pieces by Brough), Milwood in George de Barnwell by H. J. Byron (1862), Caleb Plummer in Dot (1862), by Dion Boucicault, Pitcher in The Area Belle (1864), and Prudent in The Fast Family by B. Webster, Jr. His other great successes there were as Mr. Tetterby in an adaptation of Dickens' The Haunted Man and of a frightened servant in Boucicault's The Phantom. He played a season in 1867 with the impressive new company at Queen's Theatre that included Irving, Henrietta Hodson, Lionel Brough and Charles Wyndham, where he appeared in such works a H. J. Byron's Dearer Than Life, as Michael Garner, and W. S. Gilbert's La Vivandière, as Sergeant Sulpizio. Frederick Waddy wrote of Toole in 1873 that as Harry Coke in Off the Line, "Mr. Toole makes one of those perfect pictures of everyday life of the lower class in which he has so often proved himself a consummate artist. But in low comedy and broad farce it would be difficult to find an actor of equal merit.... As Paul Pry he keeps his audience in a roar whenever he is on the stage".

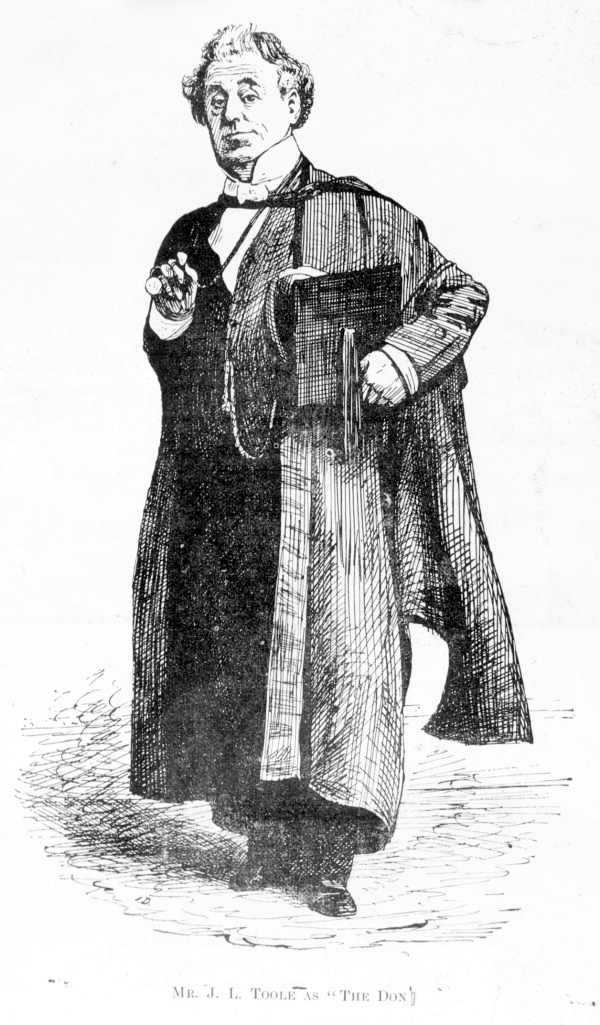
Toole in the title role in The Don (1888)

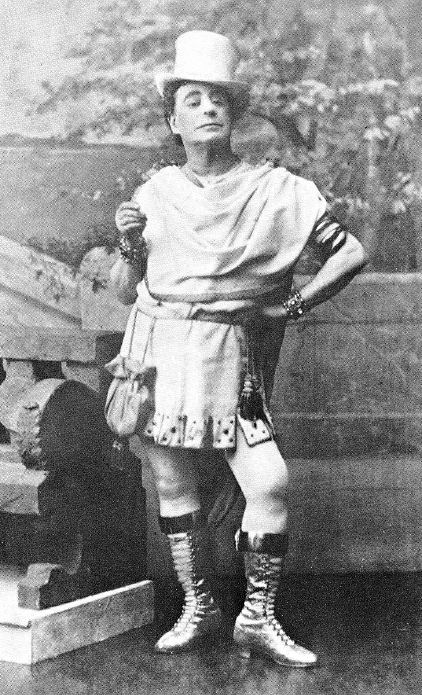
Toole in the title role in Paw Claudian

Toole was then engaged in 1868 at the Gaiety Theatre by Hollingshead, appearing in many pieces there including Thespis (1871), the first Gilbert and Sullivan collaboration, and as John Lockwood, in a drama called Wait and Hope. In 1872–74, among other successes, he portrayed Tom Larkin in Good News by H. J. Byron, the Irishman Brulgruddery in John Bull by George Colman the Younger; Bob Acres in The Rivals by Richard Brinsley Sheridan, together with Charles James Mathews and Samuel Phelps; the title role in a Robert Reece burlesque called Don Giovanni in Venice; another title role in Guy Fawkes by H. J. Byron, and created the role of the barrister Hammond Coote in Wig and Gown by James Albery. Toole's fame was at its height in 1874, when he went on tour to America, but he failed to reproduce there the success he had found in England. He remained based mostly at the Gaiety until the end of 1877, when he moved to the Globe Theatre under his own management for two years.

In 1878, Toole created the role of Charles Liquorpond in A Fool and his Money by H. J. Byron. Liquorpond was a retired footman unexpectedly overtaken by wealth, and Toole's affectedly superior pronunciation, particularly of his own name, was a tremendous success. In his prime, Toole achieved wide popularity as a comic actor, being noted for his comic delivery of words, but he did not confine himself exclusively to comedy. He also excelled in domestic melodramas (adaptations by Dion Boucicault and others of Charles Dickens and similar writers), playing "tender-hearted victims of fate", where he was famously able to combine humour and pathos. The Times said of his performance in Dearer than Life by Henry James Byron:

"Mr. J. L. Toole... is associated in the minds of the general public mainly with parts provoking to uproarious laughter; but it may fairly be questioned whether, like his predecessor in this also, his heart does not lie with, and he himself is not seen to more advantage in, the telling sketches from everyday life to which, for want of a better, we give the name of domestic drama. Anything more lifelike than the intensity of cold and hunger from which he may be almost said to suffer, in the garret-scene, as Michael Garner it would be difficult to conceive."

=== Later years ===
In 1879, Toole realised a lifelong ambition by taking over the management of the Folly Theatre in London. He renovated the building and renamed it Toole's Theatre in 1881, becoming the first actor to have a West End theatre named after him. He was often away in the British provinces, but he produced a number of plays in London:

- H. J. Byron's A Fool and His Money (1879)
- Arthur Wing Pinero's Hester's Mystery (1880)
- Byron's Upper Crust (1880) and Auntie (1882)
- A. W. Pinero's Girls and Boys: a Nursery Tale (1882) starring Toole as Solomon Prothero
- F. C. Burnand's Stage Dora; or, Who Killed Cock Robin (1883), a burlesque of Sardou's Fédora, starring Toole
- Burnand's Paw Claudian (1884), a burlesque of the 1883 costume (Byzantine) drama 'Claudian' by Henry Herman and W. G. Wills
- Pinero's Girls and Boys (1885)
- Mr. Guffin's Elopement and The Great Tay-Kin, both with words by Arthur Law and music by George Grossmith, starring Toole (1885)
- A revival of Billee Taylor (1886)
- The Butler, by Herman Charles Merivale, starring Toole (1886)
- Pepita, an operetta by Charles Lecocq (1888)
- The Don, by Merivale, starring Toole (1888).
- The Bungalow, by Fred Horner (1890)
- J. M. Barrie's Ibsen's Ghost, or, Toole up to Date, a one-act satire on London productions of Ibsen, including Hedda Gabler, starring Irene Vanbrugh and Toole (1891)
- Barrie's Walker, London, a highly successful farce, directed by Toole (1892)

By the 1880s Toole suffered frequently from gout, which made it difficult for him to walk and affected his ability to perform. His health declined further following a string of family tragedies that left him disconsolate: his son died in 1879 after a football injury, his daughter in 1888 of typhoid fever, and his wife three months later in 1889. By this time, his acting had become unfashionable: he began to be seen as the last of the line of old-fashioned low comic actors who had been popular earlier in the century, including Buckstone, John Liston and Edward Richard Wright. Nevertheless, he toured Australia and New Zealand in 1890. He published his reminiscences in 1888, and his stage appearances gradually became fewer. After an 1893 illness during Thoroughbred by Ralph Lumley, he retired from the London stage, although he made occasional appearances in the provinces until about 1896. His theatre was demolished in 1895 for an extension of Charing Cross Hospital, and he dissolved his theatre company after an 1896 tour.

The critic Clement Scott called Toole "one of the kindest and most genial men who ever drew breath. ... No one acted with more spirit or enjoyed so thoroughly the mere pleasure of acting." His genial and sympathetic nature was conspicuous off the stage as well as on it, and he was known as a great practical joker.

Ultimately he retired to Brighton, where, after a long struggle with Bright's disease and a degenerative spinal illness, he died in 1906 at the age of 76. He is buried at Kensal Green Cemetery in London, next to his wife and children. Toole was a good businessman and left a considerable fortune of over £81,000, out of which he made a number of bequests to charity, to needy actors and to his friends.

== See also ==
- Beefsteak Club
