= Sarah Woolgar =

English stage actress (1824–1909)

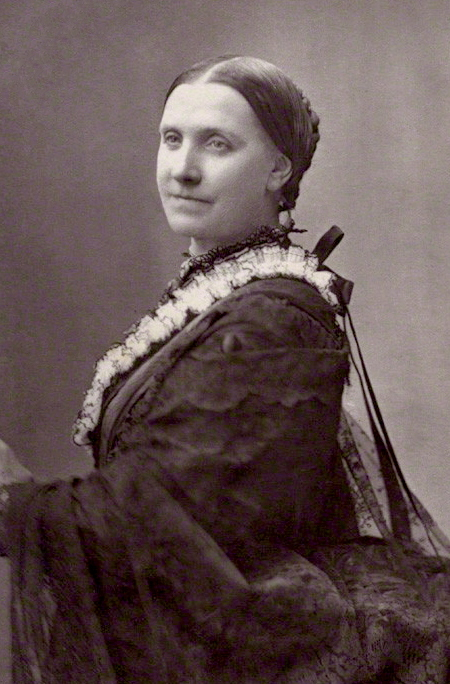
Sarah Jane Woolgar

Sarah Jane Woolgar (8 July 1824 – 8 September 1909) was an English stage actress. She had leading roles in plays by notable dramatists of the day, including original productions. She had a long association with the Adelphi Theatre in London.

== Early life and career ==
Sarah Woolgar was born in Gosport, Hampshire, on 8 July 1824. Her father, a tailor and unsuccessful actor, gave her a professional training. Making her first appearance at Plymouth in May 1836, as Leolyn in The Wood Demon, she quickly acquired a reputation as a "young phenomenon", performing at Halifax, York, Nottingham, and on the Worcester circuit. Subsequently she studied music, and at Birmingham in 1841, during the visit of Joseph and Mary Ann Wood, the operatic vocalists, sang for five nights as Adalgisa in Norma. In November 1842 she fulfilled a successful engagement at the Theatre Royal, Manchester, where she appeared as Ophelia in Hamlet.

On 9 October 1843 Miss Woolgar made her London debut at the Adelphi Theatre as Cleopatra in Charles Selby's burletta Antony and Cleopatra. With the Adelphi she was long associated. Her first original character there was in T. Egerton Wilks's romantic drama The Roll of the Drum in October 1843. In April 1844 she joined Robert and Mary Anne Keeley at the Lyceum Theatre, London, and after appearing in several light pieces she rendered to great advantage the part of Mercy in Stirling's version of Charles Dickens's Martin Chuzzlewit.

== Adelphi Theatre ==
In the autumn of 1844 the Adelphi reopened under the management of Benjamin Webster and Madame Céleste, and the golden period of Miss Woolgar's career at that theatre began. In October of that year she showed dramatic feeling as Lazarillo in Dion Boucicault's Don Cesar de Bazan. At the Haymarket in November (owing to the sudden illness of Madame Vestris) she played Lady Alice Hawthorn, on half a day's notice, in the same author's new comedy Old Heads and Young Hearts. She returned to the Adelphi at Easter 1845, and afterwards fulfilled some provincial engagements with her father. At the Adelphi in March 1847 she was the original Lemuel in John Baldwin Buckstone's melodrama The Flowers of the Forest. Charles Dickens spoke of this performance as the most remarkable and complete piece of melodrama he had seen.

Appearances in a variety of unimportant dramas, farces, and burlesques followed. After a severe illness she reappeared at the Adelphi in March 1852 in Paul Pry, as Phoebe to Edward Richard Wright's Paul Pry. In April 1853 she was Mrs Vane in Tom Taylor and Charles Reade's Masks and Faces, and among her original characterisations in 1854 was Anne Musgrave in Tom Taylor and Charles Reade's Two Loves and a Life, in May.

She married on 28 July 1855 Alfred Mellon, violinist and leader of the Adelphi orchestra, and from this time acted under her married name.

== Lyceum Theatre ==
In 1856 she joined the Lyceum company under Charles Dillon, appearing there in September as Florizel in William Brough's burlesque Perdita, to the Perdita of Marie Wilton, who then made her metropolitan debut. In October she was the original Constance in The Three Musketeers. In March 1857 she appeared as Ophelia, Charles Dillon playing Prince Hamlet. A reviewer wrote: "Miss Woolgar's Ophelia was one of the finest performances of the character we have ever seen. It was full of genius, and the pathos of the mad scene was irresistible." (Daily News, 21 March 1857.)

The following Christmas she sustained a leading character in the Oriental pantomime Lalla-Rookh. In January 1858 she was the original Countess de Montelons in Leigh Hunt's comedy Lovers' Amazements.

== The New Adelphi ==
On the opening of the new Adelphi Theatre on 27 December 1858, Mrs Mellon played Memory in the apropos sketch "Mr Webster's company is requested at a Photographic Soiree", afterwards delivering Shirley Brooks's inaugural address in the same character. Her finest original role at this period was Catherine Duval in Watts Phillips's The Dead Heart, in November 1859. In January 1860 her Mrs Cratchit in A Christmas Carol; or, Past, Present, and Future was highly praised by Henry Morley. In March 1860, at Covent Garden, in aid of the funds of the ill-fated Royal Dramatic College, she played Black-Eyed Susan in Douglas Jerrold's drama to T. P. Cooke's William, notable as Cooke's last appearance on the stage. At the Adelphi in September 1860, when The Colleen Bawn was performed for the first time in England, Mrs Mellon played Anne Chute, "winning, perhaps, the foremost honours of the night" (Morley). She appeared with J L Toole at the Adelphi in October 1864 in Andrew Halliday and William Brough's The Area Belle: in a letter, Dickens described her acting as quite admirable.

On 5 October 1867 the Adelphi was reopened under her own supervision (but not responsible management). In December 1867 she was the original Sally Goldstraw in Charles Dickens and Wilkie Collins's drama No Thoroughfare. In March 1875 she played Mrs Squeers in a revival of Andrew Halliday's version of Nicholas Nickleby, and in the following October Gretchen in Rip Van Winkle, with its author Joseph Jefferson in the title role.

== Later years ==
Failing to keep step with the steady march towards naturalness, she came to be considered stilted and over-pronounced. On 15 May 1878 a testimonial performance of The Green Bushes was given on her behalf at Drury Lane, when Madame Céleste made her last appearance on the stage. In May 1879 she reappeared at the Adelphi as Mrs Candour in a revival of The School for Scandal, and there in April 1880 she played Mrs O'Kelly in the first performance given in England of Boucicault's The Shaughraun. In August following, at the Haymarket, she was the original Miss Sniffe in Boucicault's comedy A Bridal Tour. She remained on the stage until 1883.

Mrs Mellon died at her residence in Vardens Road, Wandsworth Common, after a very brief illness, on 8 September 1909, and was buried in Brompton Cemetery beside her husband, whom she survived forty-two years. She left two daughters, of whom the younger, Mary Woolgar Mellon, became an actress.
