= The Willow Copse =

The Willow Copse is an English play by Dion Boucicault adapted from the French play La Closerie des Genêts by Frédéric Soulié.

It debuted in England at the Adelphi Theatre on November 26, 1849 with a cast included Madame Céleste as Rose Fielding and Henry Hughes as Luke Fielding. The original bill identified that it was written by "two popular authors," the second of which has been credited as Charles Lamb Kenney. It ran for 91 consecutive performances through March 16, 1850.

The play had its American debut in May 1852 at the Walnut Street Theatre in Philadelphia, with Celeste, and also with Charles Walter Couldock playing the role of Luke Fielding, and who later toured widely playing the same role for a number of years (with his daughter eventually playing the role of Rose Fielding), still reviving the role as late as 1885.

A September 1859 revival at the Adelphi played for thirty-six consecutive nights, and featured Benjamin Nottingham Webster as Luke Fielding, Sarah Woolgar as Meg, and John Lawrence Toole as Augustus de Rosherville.
