= Edwin Wright =

Edwin Wright may refer to:

- Edwin M. Wright (1897–1987), American foreign policy specialist
- Edwin R. V. Wright (1812–1871), U.S. Representative from New Jersey
- Edwin Kennedy Wright (1898–1983), US Army officer and deputy director of the US Central Intelligence Agency
- Tré Cool (Frank Edwin Wright III, born 1972), member of band Green Day

== See also ==
- Ed Wright (disambiguation)
