= Ed Wright =

Ed Wright may refer to:

- Ed Wright (baseball) (1919–1995), pitcher in Major League Baseball
- Ed Wright (composer) (born 1980), British composer
- Ed Wright (fencer) (1949–2017), American Olympic fencer
- Ed Wright (politician) (1827–1895), Iowa Secretary of State
- Ed Wright (sailor) (born 1977), British World Champion Sailor
- Ed Wright (1940-2023), American music executive

== See also ==
- Edward Wright (disambiguation)
- Edwin Wright (disambiguation)
