= Charles Walter Couldock =

19th-century actor

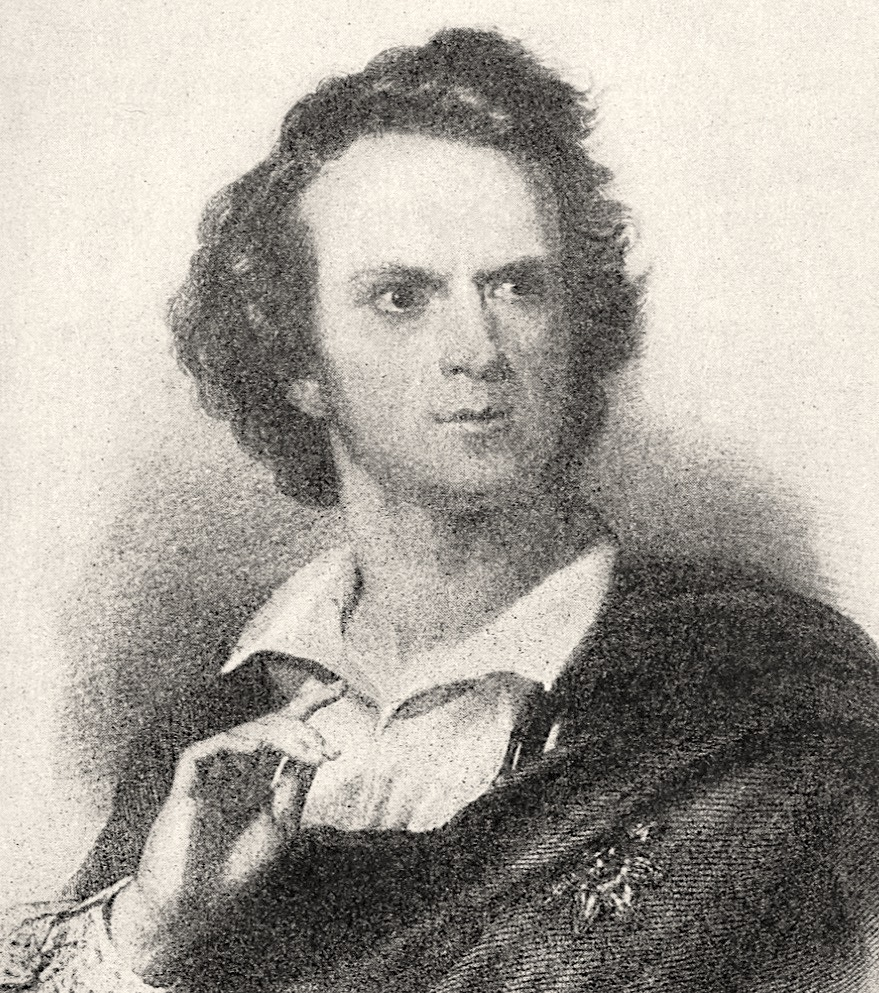
Couldock as Hamlet

Charles Walter Couldock (26 April 1815 – 27 November 1898) was a popular 19th-century English actor.

== History ==
Born in Long Acre, England, he made his stage debut in Shakespeare's Othello at London's Sadler's Wells Theatre in 1835. He was a part of traveling and stock companies in England before obtaining more stable positions in Birmingham and Liverpool in 1845. Actress Charlotte Cushman enticed Couldock to travel to the United States in 1849, where he made a successful American debut on 8 October 1849 in The Stranger. He played in the stock company of Philadelphia's Walnut Street Theatre from 1850 to 1855. Among roles he first played during this period was that of Luke Fielding in The Willow Copse, a role he later reprised many times. In 1858 he joined the company of Laura Keene, where he appeared in the first American production of Our American Cousin.

His best known role was as Dunstan Kirke in Hazel Kirke, a huge success of its time, which debuted in New York in February 1880 and ran for 486 consecutive performances, and also traveled broadly. Couldock may have acted the role over 1,500 times.

American National Biography (1999) describes Couldock as being of "the old-school sentimental style of acting which required great emotive power and a command of the sweeping gesture" and at his best "in maudlin domestic pieces" where "he gave convincing life to a gallery of uniquely American stage characters." ANB also notes that while "recognized as an important theatrical figure both in his own time and in ours, Couldock has not received sustained scholarly attention from historians ...."

Harper's Weekly noted Couldock's broad popularity in 1895: "If there is any adult American who does not know Charles Couldock, it must be a resident of some very remote place, or a person reared with more than ordinary success in the belief that play-going is a sinful pastime."

Couldock acted well into the 1890s, and died at his home in New York City in November 1898. He was buried in the Actors Fund plot at the Cemetery of the Evergreens.

== Personal ==
Couldock married Louisa Smith while still in England, and they remained married until her death in 1877. Their daughter Eliza was an actress who died in Salt Lake City at age 27.
