= Edward Richard Wright =

Comedian and actor

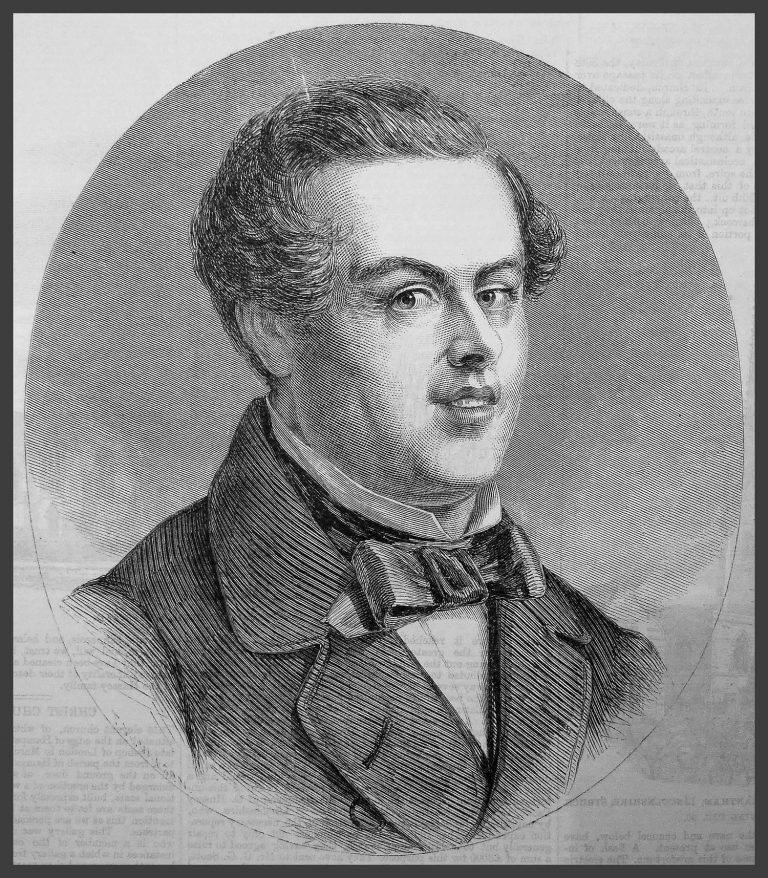
Edward Richard Wright

Edward Richard Wright (c. 1813–21 December 1859) was an English comedian and actor.

== Life ==
He was one of at least five children born to Elizabeth and Francis Wright, whose profession was listed as "Gent", of Sloane Square in London. He was initially apprenticed to a bookbinder, but later abandoned that career, and his wife, for the stage. He had married his first wife, Mary Lucretia Jacobs (1802-1849) in December 1833 at Kensington in Middlesex. The marriage was not a happy one, and Wright having left her destitute when he left her, he was sued by his wife in court in 1838 for the return of their infant daughter, Charlotte Frances Wright (1837-), and to provide his estranged wife with suitable maintenance. She never regained custody of her daughter.

Wright became a citizen of London and a member of the Skinners' Company. After acting, in September 1832 at the Margate Theatre, John Reeve's part of Marmaduke Magog in the Wreck Ashore of John Baldwin Buckstone, he was seen in London, in 1834, at the Queen's Theatre. After a time spent on the stage in Birmingham and Bristol, he came to the St. James's Theatre, then built and opened by John Braham, and on the first night made his earliest recognised appearance as a comedian, on 29 Sept. 1837, as Splash in the ‘Young Widow,’ and Fitzcloddy in a farce called ‘Methinks I see my Father.’ His reception was favourable. On 20 March 1838 he was the original Wigler in Selby's ‘Valet de Sham.’ At this house, too, he was the first Simmons in Haynes Bayly's ‘Spitalfields Weaver.’ On 3 December 1838 at the Adelphi, destined to be his home, and with which his fame is principally associated, he was the first Daffodil Primrose, a valet in Stirling's ‘Grace Darling, or the Wreck at Sea,’ and on 28 October 1839 the first Shotbolt in Buckstone's ‘Jack Sheppard.’ He also played in a burletta called ‘The Giant of Palestine.’ During one year he visited the Princess's; then, returning to the Adelphi, remained there, with the exception of visits of a few days or weeks to the Strand, the Standard, or other houses, until the year of his death. His constant associates were Paul Bedford and, in his later years, Sarah Woolgar (Sarah Jane Mellon).

== At the Adelphi ==
At the Adelphi Wright made his first conspicuous success, in 1842, as Tittlebat Titmouse in Peake's adaptation of Warren's ‘Ten Thousand a Year.’ He also played Adelgisa in Oxberry's burlesque of ‘Norma,’ Leamington Spooner in Peake's ‘H. B.,’ and in December 1842 a Tumbler in Stirling Coyne's ‘Merchant's Clerks.’ In September 1843, he was with Paul Bedford and William Henry Oxberry at the Strand, where he appeared in ‘Bombastes Furioso’ and the ‘Three Graces,’ but in November was back at the Adelphi, playing in the ‘Bohemians, or the Rogues of Paris.’ In February 1844 he was Bob Cratchit in A Christmas Carol; or, Past, Present, and Future, Stirling's adaptation of ‘A Christmas Carol,’ and Richard in a burlesque of ‘Richard III.’ On 29 October, he was Criquet, a valet, in Selby's ‘Mysterious Stranger.’ He also played at the Princess's in a farce called ‘Wilful Murder,’ and in a burlesque by A'Becket of ‘Aladdin,’ and was seen at the Strand. In February 1845, he was the hero of ‘Mother and Child are doing well,’ and at Easter he played in Buckstone's ‘Poor Jack.’

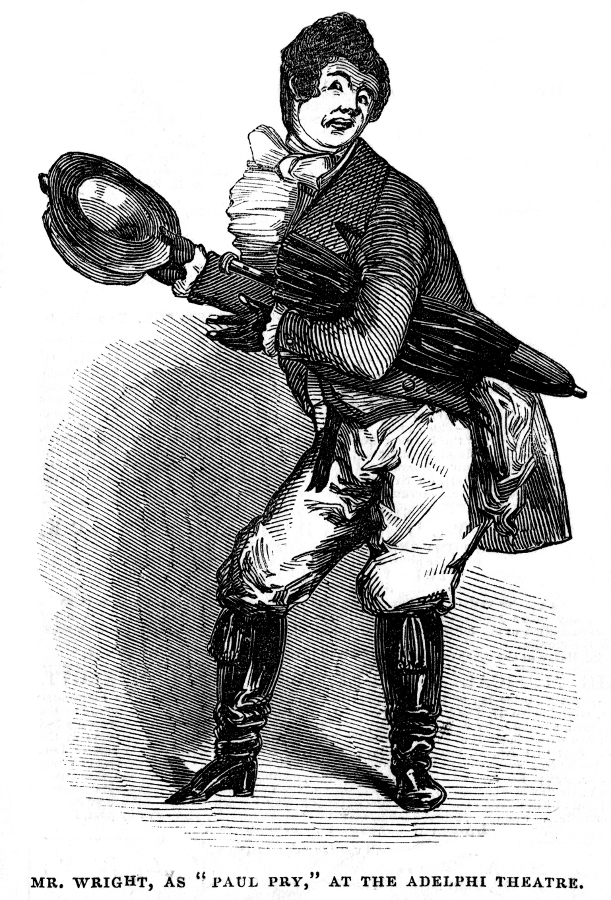
As Paul Pry (1845)

After a long absence, due to illness, he reappeared at the Adelphi on 1 September 1845 as Barbillon in Stirling's ‘Clarisse, or the Merchant's Daughter.’ On 31 December, he was Tilly Slowboy in Stirling's adaptation of the ‘Cricket on the Hearth.’ He was very popular in Liston's rôle of Paul Pry (1845), was the first Smear in ‘Domestic Cookery,’ and appeared in Madison Morton's ‘Seeing Wright.’ In Holl's ‘Leoline, or Life's Trial,’ he was, on 2 Feb. 1846, the first Apollo Kit, a rheumatic dancing master, and on 16 March the first Chesterfield Honeybun in Coyne's ‘Did you ever send your wife to Camberwell?’ In July, he played in Peake's ‘Devil of Marseilles, or the Spirit of Avarice,’ and in Buckstone's ‘Maid of the Milking-pail;’ and in August in ‘Marie Ducange’ and in the ‘Judgment of Paris,’ a burlesque, in which he was Venus. Acis Moccasin, in the ‘Jockey Club,’ belonged to October. He played in the same month in ‘Mrs. Gamp's Tea and Turn out,’ and was seen in Selby's ‘Phantom Dancers.’ In March 1847 he was in Buckstone's ‘Flowers of the Forest,’ and in the same month enacted Jem Baggs in the ‘Wandering Minstrel.’ In Peake's ‘Title-deeds’ (22 June 1847) he was a literary hack, and on 26 July, in Coyne's ‘How to Settle Accounts with your Laundress,’ a fashionable tailor. Other parts to which his name appears are Alderman Cute in the ‘Chimes,’ by Mark Lemon and A'Becket; Almidor in ‘St. George and the Dragon;’ Chatterton Chopkins in ‘This House to be let,’ a skit on the sale of Shakespeare's house; a comic servant in Peake's ‘Gabrielli;’ Green in ‘A Thumping Legacy;’ Restless Wriggle in the ‘Hop-pickers’ (March 1849); Deeply Dive in ‘Who lives at No. 9;’ a part in the ‘Haunted Man;’ Tom in the ‘Devil's Violin;’ a lawyer's clerk in ‘Mrs. Bunbury's Spoons;’ Thomas Augustus Tadcaster in Webster's ‘Royal Red Book;’ and himself in ‘An unwarrantable intrusion will be committed by Mr. Wright to the annoyance of Paul Bedford.’ In 1852 he was at the Princess's, whence he migrated in turn to the Lyceum, the Haymarket, Sadler's Wells, and the country, reappearing at the Adelphi in 1855. His most popular success, which has always since been associated with his name, was his Master Grinnidge, the travelling showman in the ‘Green Bushes.’ Scarcely less admired was his John Grumley in ‘Domestic Economy.’ He was excellent, too, in ‘Slasher and Crasher,’ as Blaise in Buckstone's ‘Victorine,’ as Medea in Mark Lemon's burlesque so named, as Watchful Waxend in ‘My Poll and my Partner,’ and several parts in which he replaced John Reeve. At the last performance at the old Adelphi (2 June 1858) he played Mr. Osnaburg in ‘Welcome, Little Stranger.’ Soon after the opening of the new house, in 1859, he appeared for a few nights. At the end of March his engagement finished, and he left the house and was not again seen on the stage.

In his best days, Wright was a noted low comedian; Macready pronounced him the best he had seen. He took unpardonable liberties with a public that laughed at, pardoned, petted, and spoilt him. He often did not know his part and resorted to gagging. On occasion he could be indescribably and repulsively coarse. Some of his performances had remarkable breadth of humour. He inherited the method and traditions of Reeve and to some extent those of Liston. At his death many of his characters came into the hands of John Lawrence Toole.

A portrait of Wright as Marmaduke Magog from a painting by Crabb is given in the ‘Theatrical Times,’ i. 225; one as Tittlebat Titmouse, engraved by Holl from a drawing by E. Walker, appears in Cumberland's edition of ‘Ten Thousand a Year.’

== Personal ==
He was born in 1813. He married his second wife, Rose Olivia Bedford (1826-1888), a niece of Paul Bedford, in June 1857 in Wimbledon in Surrey, six weeks before the birth of their daughter, Rose Fanny Wright (1857-1860). Towards the close of 1859 he took refuge from ill-health, worries domestic and financial, and legal proceedings at the home of his sister in Boulogne, where he died on 21 December 1859. His body was returned and he was buried in Brompton Cemetery.
