= William Oxberry =

English actor (1784–1824)

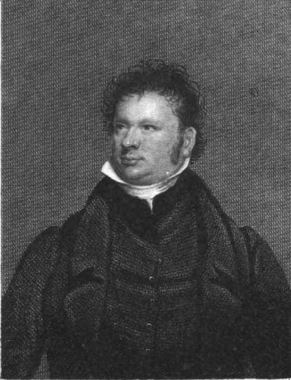
William Oxberry in 1825

William Oxberry (1784–1824) was an English actor. He also wrote extensively on the theatre, and was a printer and publisher.

== Early life ==
Oxberry was the son of an auctioneer, born on 18 December 1784 in Moorfields, London, opposite Bedlam. After a false start as a pupil of George Stubbs at age 14, he worked in a bookseller's shop, and in the office in Tottenham Court Road of a printer named Seale, an amateur actor. At a stable near Queen Anne Street, and subsequently at the theatre in Berwick Street, he took on parts including Hassan in The Castle Spectre ("Monk" Lewis) and Rosse in Macbeth.

Oxberry's indentures were cancelled in 1802, and he appeared under Samuel Jerrold at the Watford theatre. He joined, as a low comedian, Trotter's company (Worthing, Hythe, and Southend theatres).

== Metropolitan actor ==
In 1807, Henry Siddons recommended Oxberry to the Kemble management at Covent Garden Theatre. He made his first appearance on 7 November 1807 as Robin Roughhead in Fortune's Frolic, but was not a critical success. At the close of the season he was released from his engagement, and went to Glasgow, where he made a success as Sir David Daw in the Wheel of Fortune. In Aberdeen, he was tried as Michael Ducas in Adalgitha: he then played other tragic roles.

After returning to Glasgow, Oxberry accepted from Raymond an engagement in London at the Lyceum Theatre, then known as the English Opera House, and appeared in a piece by Henry Siddons, called 'The Russian Impostor,' in which he made a success. He was then engaged for the Lyceum by Arnold. An engagement at Drury Lane Theatre followed. and he played for the first time with the burnt-out company at the Lyceum, 25 September 1809, as the Lay Brother in the Duenna. After the opening of the new Drury Lane theatre his name is not mentioned until the end of the season. At Drury Lane, he remained until the close of the season of 1819–20. He created many original parts in plays, dramatic or musical, by Arnold, Thomas John Dibdin, James Kenney, George Soane, and others.

Oxberry, as a comic actor, was not always a distinguished performer. He was compared only to John Emery as Tyke, John Lump, Robin Roughhead; his Slender, Sir David Daw, and Petro were held to have been unsurpassed. When Robert William Elliston reduced the salaries at Drury Lane, he refused the offer, and starred at minor theatres (the Surrey, the East London, and Sadler's Wells).

== Later life ==
Oxberry was for a long time manager of the Olympic, but the experiment collapsed. In December 1821 he took the Craven's Head chophouse at Drury Lane, a house of literary and theatrical resort. Here he died 9 June 1824. His remains were interred in a vault in St. Clement Danes Church, Strand.

== Works ==
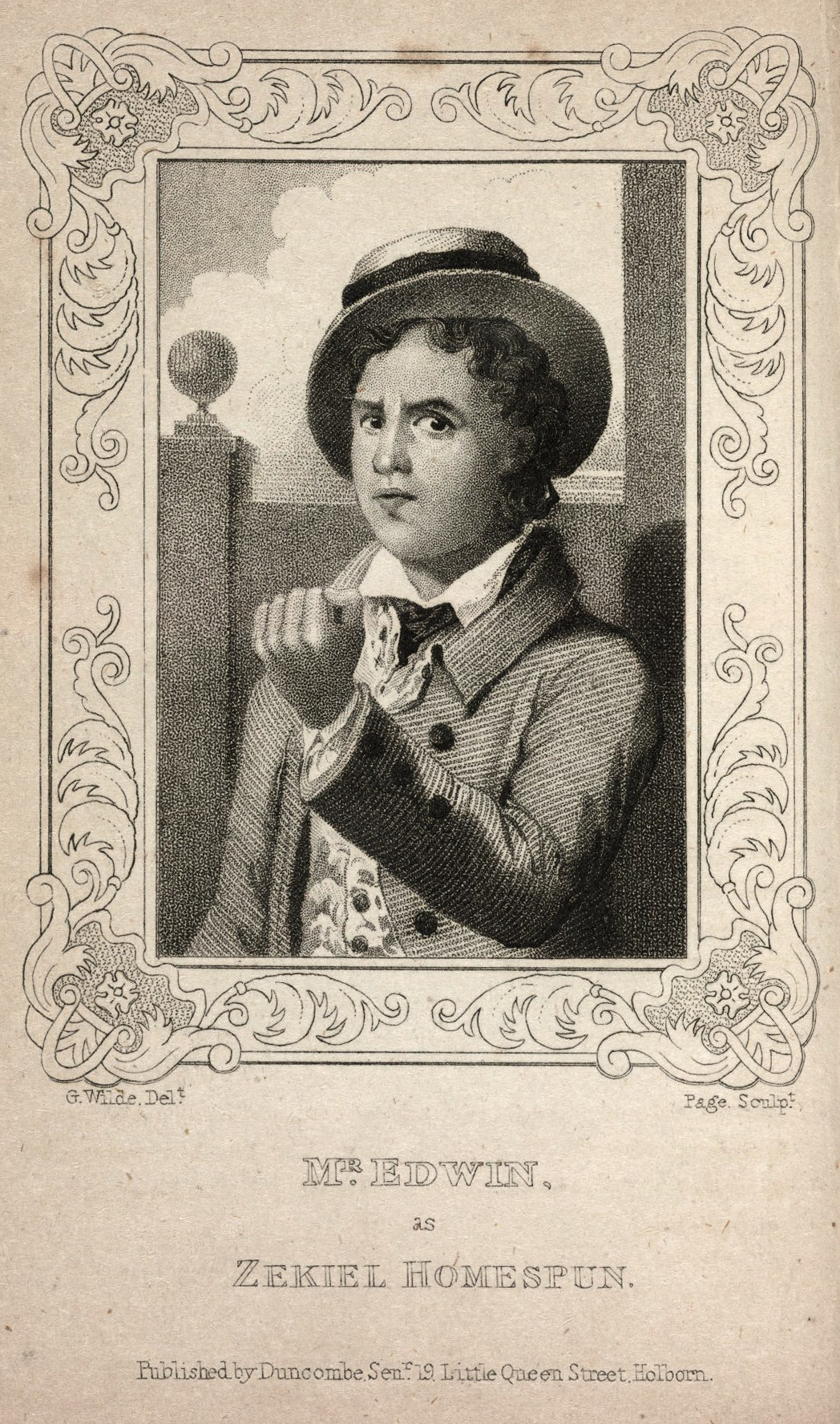
Illustration from Oxberry's Dramatic Biography and Histrionic Anecdotes, 1825–1826

Oxberry was author of:

- The Theatrical Banquet, or the Actor's Budget, 1809, 2 vols.
- The Encyclopædia of Anecdote, 1812.
- The History of Pugilism, and Memoirs of Persons who have distinguished themselves in that Science, 1814.
- The Flowers of Literature, 2nd edit., London, 1824, 4 vols.
- Oxberry's Anecdotes of the Stage, London, 1827.

He also edited The New English Drama, consisting of 113 plays, with prefatory remarks, in 22 vols. 1818–24; and wrote The Actress of All Work, played in Bath on 8 May 1819, in which Elizabeth Rebecca Edwin assumed half a dozen different characters. He converted He would be a Soldier of Pilon into The High Road to Success, and produced it at the Olympic. He was responsible for an adaptation of Walter Scott's Marmion, played at an outlying theatre. For a short period he edited the Monthly Mirror, to which, and to The Cabinet, he contributed fugitive pieces.

A portrait of Oxberry by Samuel De Wilde, in the Garrick Club, shows him as Petro in Arnold's Devil's Bridge. An engraving of him as Leo Luminati in Oh! this Love is in the Theatrical Inquisitor (vol. i.); and a second, presenting him in private dress, is in Oxberry's Dramatic Biography, a work projected by Oxberry, and edited after his death by his widow; it was published in parts, beginning 1 January 1825. After the completion of the first volume in April 1825 the issue was continued in volumes, and was completed in five vols. in 1826.

== Family ==
In 1806 Oxberry married, at Southend, a young actress playing minor parts in the Trotter company, Catherine Elizabeth Hewitt. The actor William Henry Oxberry was their son.

== Notes ==
Attribution

This article incorporates text from a publication now in the public domain: Lee, Sidney, ed. (1895). "Oxberry, William (1784-1824)". Dictionary of National Biography. Vol. 43. London: Smith, Elder & Co.
