= Richard John Smith =

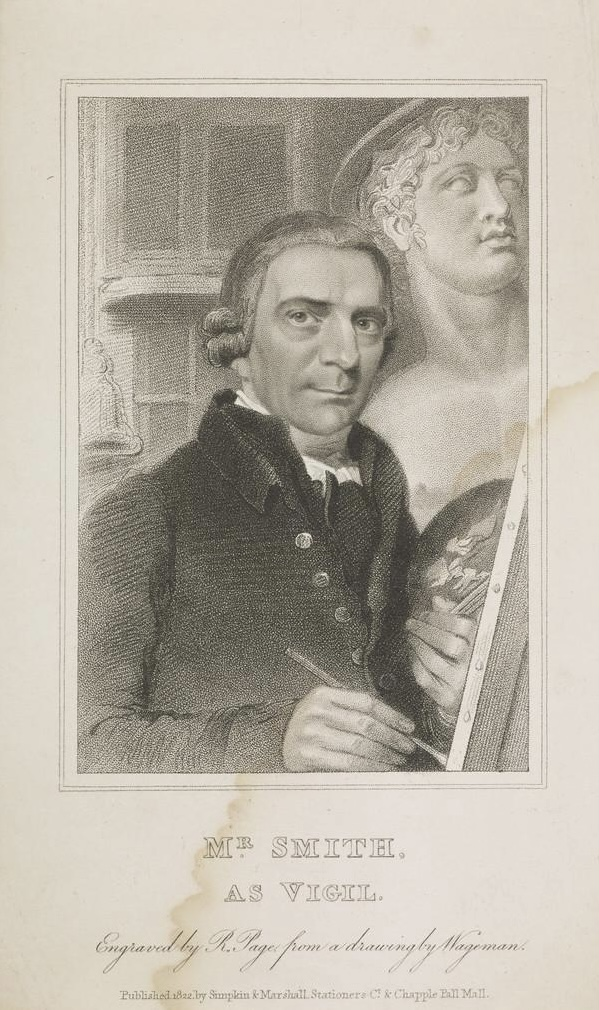
Richard John Smith as Vigil (1822)

Richard John Smith (1786 – 1 February 1855) was a British actor of the early Victorian era. He was among the first to play Frankenstein's monster on stage, which he did in 1826 in The Man and The Monster; or The Fate of Frankenstein.

== Early life ==
In the theatrical world Smith was commonly billed as O. Smith. He was the son of an actor named William Smith, whom John Doran, in his three-volume Annals of The English Stage, from Thomas Betterton to Edmund Kean (1860) confuses with William "Gentleman" Smith. Richard John Smith was born in York in 1786. His mother, Miss Elizabeth Scrace, played leading parts in Dublin. His father was almost killed in Dublin by Samuel Reddish who as Castalio ran him through the body while he was playing Polydore in The Orphan. Smith senior brought his wife in 1779 to Yorkshire. At Hull and York under Tate Wilkinson, Mrs. Smith appeared as Beatrice in Much Ado About Nothing and speedily became a favourite. She accompanied Tate Wilkinson to Edinburgh, and in 1791 made, as Estifania in Rule a Wife and Have a Wife, her first appearance in Bath.

== Stage career ==
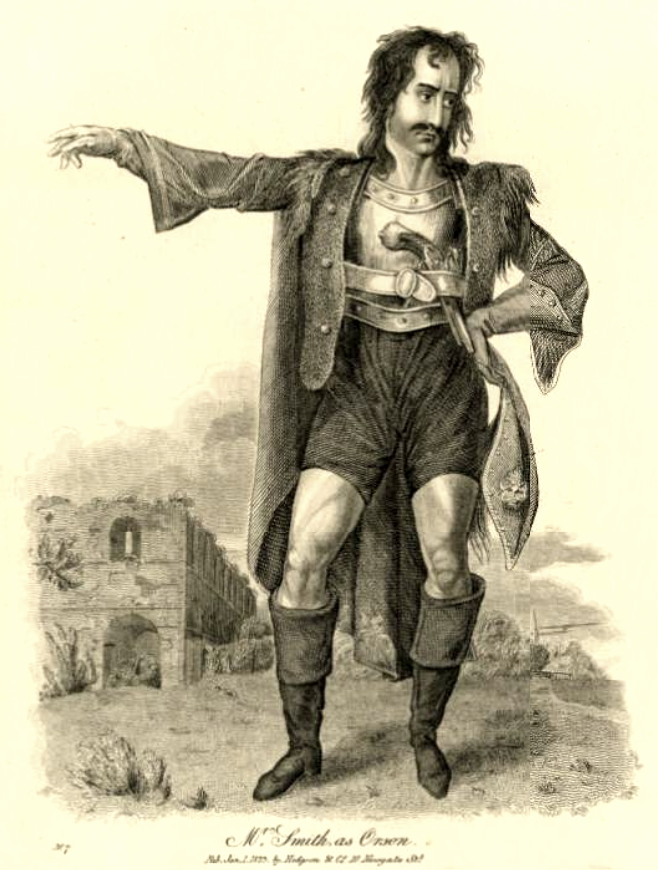
Smith as Orson, in George Colman the younger's The Iron Chest

Richard John Smith is said to have made his theatrical debut in Bath as Ariel in Hawkesworth's Edgar and Emmeline: a Fairy Tale. He played there other juvenile parts. Put into a solicitor's office by his parents, he neglected his duties, spending his time in the painting-room of the theatre, and finally ran away and embarked from Bristol as a sailor for the Guinea Coast. He later claimed to have had some romantic, perhaps even fanciful, adventures, assisting upon the river Gaboon in the escape of some slaves, an incident related in A Tough Yarn, which he published in Bentley's Miscellany. The governor of Sierra Leone, struck by his painting, offered to befriend him, but the captain of the vessel refused to release him. Returning to Bath, he found his parents obdurate, and again ran away, rambling in Wales and Ireland. Seized in Liverpool by a press gang, he was taken on board the receiving ship, but was released on stating that he was an actor, and giving as proof a recitation. Engaged by William Macready the Elder as painter, prompter, and actor of all work, he was rewarded with twelve shillings weekly, and all but lost his life in a snowstorm while travelling on foot from Sheffield to Rochdale. He then went to Edinburgh and Glasgow theatres, returning to Bath in 1807, and playing in the pantomimes.

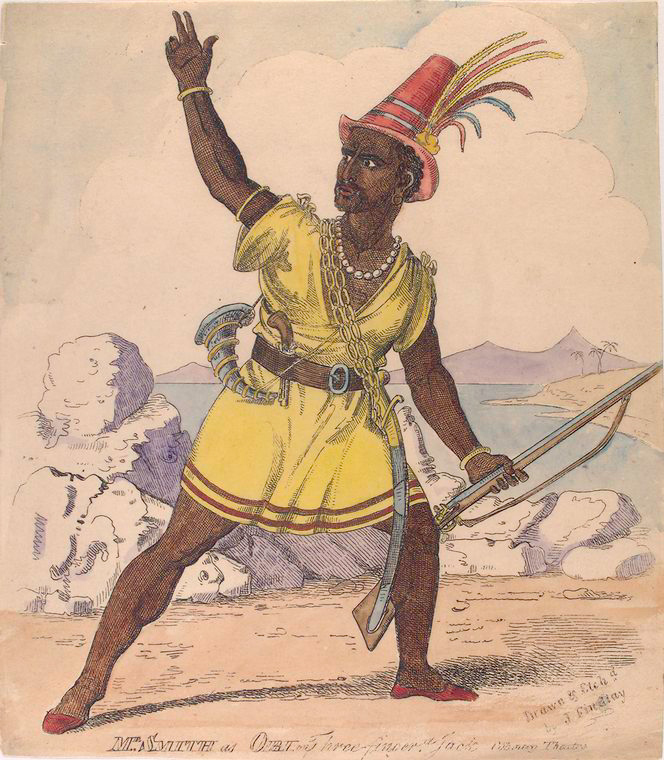
Smith as Obi in Three-fingered Jack (1819)

His performance as Robert in the pantomime of Raymond and Agnes attracted the attention of Robert William Elliston, who engaged him in 1810 for the pantomime at the Surrey Theatre. Taking in Bombastes Furioso the part of Bombastes, vacated through illness by another actor, he gave an exhibition of intensity such as established his position in burlesque. A performance of 'Obi' in the melodrama of Three-fingered Jack (1819) got him his sobriquet of 'O' (otherwise Obi) Smith. In 1813 Smith accompanied Elliston to the Olympic Theatre, where he played Mandeville in the False Friend, a rôle in which Edmund Kean was to have appeared. After acting at the Lyceum Theatre, he is said to have been engaged in 1823 at the Theatre Royal, Drury Lane, at which house he had previously been seen in pantomime. He also seems to have played at the Royal Opera House in Covent Garden. His performance in the Bottle Imp at the Lyceum Theatre attracted attention, leading him to complain, but half in jest: "For the last five years of my life I have played nothing but demons, devils, monsters, and assassins, and this line of business, however amusing it may be to the public or profitable to managers, has proved totally destructive of my peace of mind, detrimental to my interests, and injurious to my health. I find myself banished from all respectable society; what man will receive the Devil upon friendly terms, or introduce a demon into his family circle? My infernal reputation follows me everywhere". A writer in the Monthly Magazine declared him "eminent in assassins, sorcerers, the moss-trooping heroes in Sir Walter Scott's poems, and other wild, gloomy, and ominous characters in which a bold, or rather a gigantic figure, and deep sepulchral voice could be turned to good account." Smith had, however, some control over tenderness, his performance at the Lyceum, in the Cornish Miners, of a maniac who visits the grave of his dead child, being very pathetic. At Drury Lane he was, on 10 November 1824, the first Zamiel in Soane's version of Der Freischütz.

== The Adelphi Theatre ==
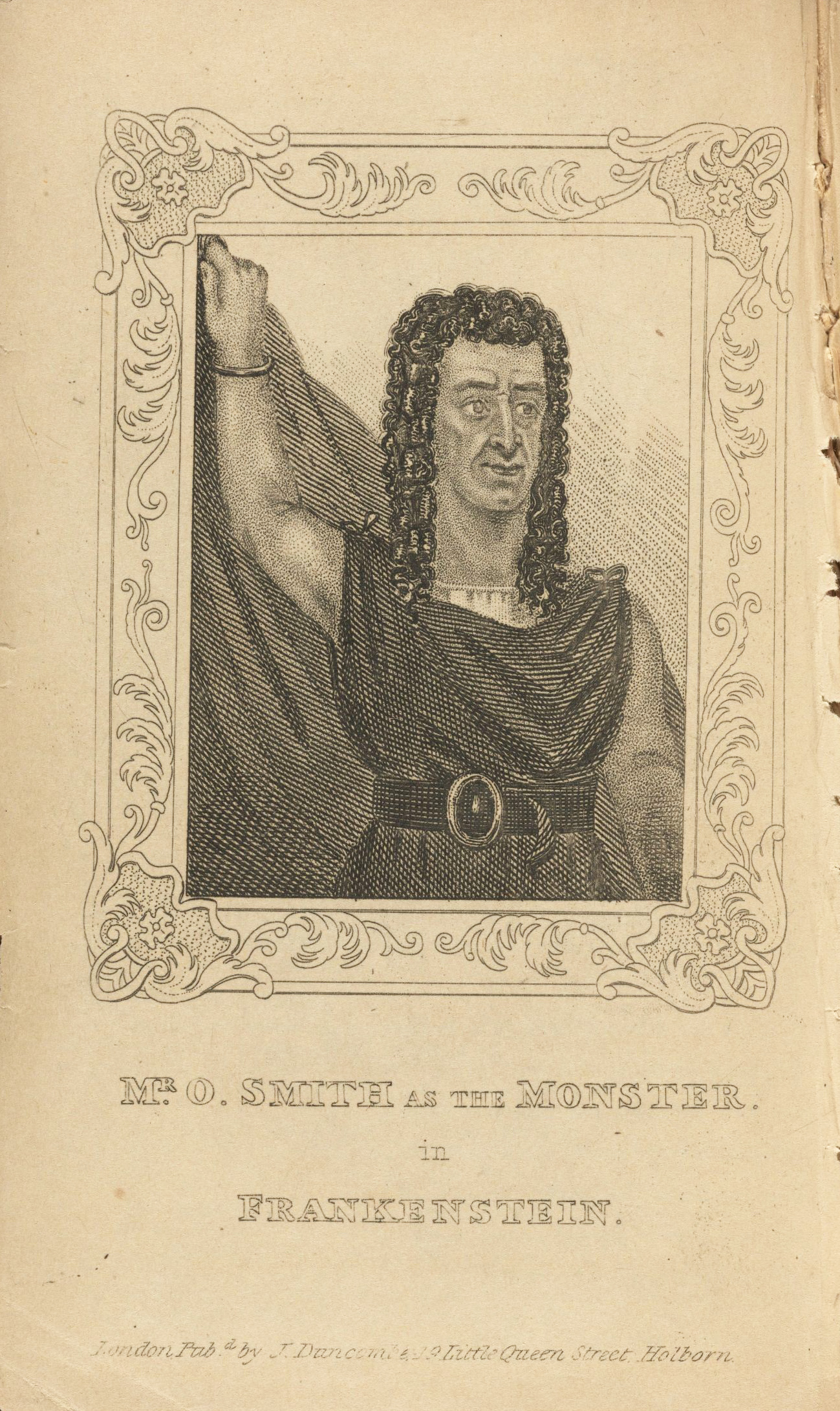
Smith as Frankenstein's monster in The Monster; or The Fate of Frankenstein (1826)

Smith played the mute Frankenstein's monster in Henry M. Milner’s production of The Man and The Monster; or The Fate of Frankenstein at the Royal Coburg Theatre in July 1826. When, in 1828, Frederick Henry Yates and Charles Mathews took the Adelphi Theatre Smith joined the company. With this theatre his subsequent reputation was chiefly connected. In the Black Vulture in October 1829, he played the villain so named. In 1831, at the Adelphi Theatre, Edinburgh, he superintended the production of the Wreck Ashore. In January 1833 he played at the Adelphi Theatre in London, a part contrasting strongly with those of which he complained, namely, Don Quixote in the piece so named. He had also a part in Holl's Grace Huntley.

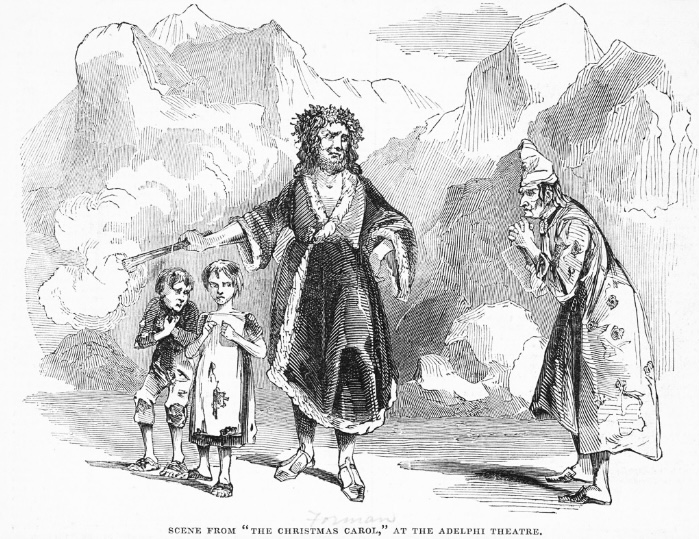
Smith (right) as Scrooge in a scene from A Christmas Carol; or, Past, Present, and Future at the Adelphi Theatre - The Illustrated London News, Saturday, 17 February 1844

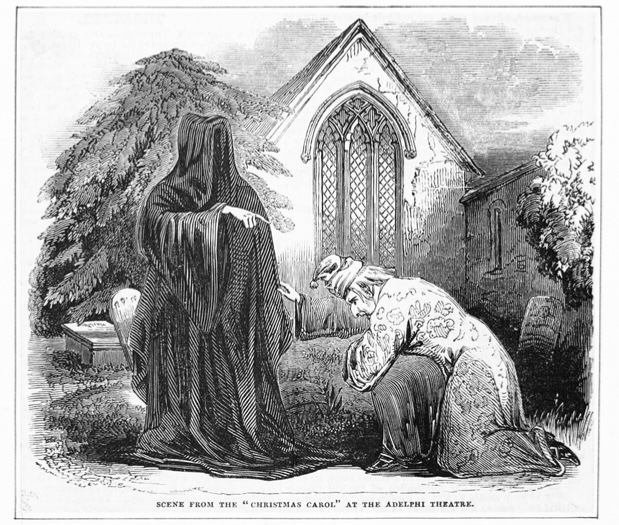
Smith as Scrooge (right) in a scene from A Christmas Carol; or, Past, Present, and Future at the Adelphi Theatre - The Illustrated London News, Saturday, 17 February 1844

In 1836 he played in an adaptation of Bulwer-Lytton’s Rienzi. He was Newman Noggs in Nicholas Nickleby; or, Doings at Do-the-Boys Hall!, an adaptation of Nicholas Nickleby. In 1839 he was Bill Sikes in Oliver Twist; or, The Parish Boy's Progress, an adaptation of Oliver Twist and in January 1843 Hugh in a stage version of Barnaby Rudge. Among numerous characters he played at the Adelphi were Ismael in The Giant of Palestine (1838); Ebenezer in The Foreign Prince (1839); Murtogh in Green Bushes, the part of a Mendicant in the Bohemians, or the Rogues of Paris in October 1843; Scrooge in A Christmas Carol; or, Past, Present, and Future, an adaptation of A Christmas Carol in February 1844. The theatre critic of The Illustrated London News wrote of his performance that, "The acting of O. Smith, as old Scrooge, the miser, was, throughout, admirable."

Smith was Laroche in Edward Stirling's adaptation Clarisse, or the Merchant's Daughter, in September 1845; Mongeraud in Holl's Leoline, or Life's Trials, in February 1846; Pierre in Richard Brinsley Peake's Devil of Marseilles, or the Spirit of Avarice in July 1846; and a cabdriver, a pathetic part, in Peake's Title Deeds in June 1857. In June 1842 he had, at the Lyceum Theatre, given a characteristic performance in a piece entitled The Dice of Death, and on 1 April 1853 he played at the Adelphi in Mr. Webster at Home. On 20 April 1854, at the same house, he was Musgrave in Tom Taylor and Charles Reade's Two Loves and a Life, and this appears to have been his last original part.

== Later years ==
About 1826 Joseph Smith, the bookseller of Holborn, having produced a set of theatrical engravings, applied to 'O Smith, the famous comedian' for an account of the English stage, to accompany the plates. An agreement was accordingly drawn up, but the author eventually deemed his prospect of credit from the work to be unsatisfactory, and withdrew from the undertaking. He nevertheless continued to accumulate materials, such as theatrical prints, newspaper cuttings, magazine articles, playbills, catalogues, etc., relating to stage history, and also to interleave and annotate theatrical memoirs. Before his death his collections filled twenty-five large quarto volumes. Of these, vols. xx–xxiii. comprise a manuscript Dramatic Chronology; the remainder consist chiefly of printed matter, scantily annotated, but interspersed with many valuable prints. The twenty-five volumes are now in the British Library, catalogued under Smith's name as A Collection of Material towards a History of the Stage.

Smith died, after a long illness, on 1 February 1855, and was buried on the 8th in West Norwood Cemetery. A portrait accompanies the memoir in the Theatrical Times.

His obituary in The Era stated:

In his peculiar line, Mr. O. Smith had no equal on the stage. Characters in which the wild, the terrific, and the impressive were the prominent features he made exclusively his own. His towering form, deep and sepulchral voice, dark features, and expressive eye, were peculiarly fitted to infuse into them that mysterious colouring so necessary to their due effect upon the mind, and oppressed the auditor with an indefinable feeling, an unearthly chilliness, and a thrilling sensation of the marvellous which no other actor could produce so effectively. The strict accuracy and picturesque style of his costumes, which were always correct even to the slightest minutiae, formed another of his characteristics, which will not easily be forgotten. For some years past the deceased had been collecting some valuable materials for the history of the modern stage, especially with reference to its decorative appliances. These, we believe, are intended to be disposed of forthwith by public auction. There are few actors that will be missed by playgoers of any years standing more than their old favourite, O. SMITH.

In his will of 1851 he left his entire estate to his wife, Elizabeth Smith.
