= William Barnes Rhodes =

British dramatist

William Barnes Rhodes (1772–1826) was an English author, best known for his burlesque opera, Bombastes Furioso.

Rhodes was born in Leeds on Christmas Day 1772, the second son of Richard Rhodes and his wife, Mercy. He worked as a writer in an attorney's office, before gaining a position as a clerk in the Bank of England around 1799. He was promoted to chief teller in 1823, and held that post until his death.

On 24 March 1825, Rhodes married Emma Millington. On 1 November 1826 he died at his home near Bedford Square, London, being survived by his wife, who gave birth to a daughter after his death.

Rhodes is best known as the author of a burlesque opera, "Bombastes Furioso", which became a popular success. It was produced anonymously at the Haymarket Theatre on 7 August 1810, with John Liston in the title role and Charles Mathews as the King of Utopia and was first printed in 1813, in Dublin, but was not published under Rhodes's name until 1822. He also published, in 1801, a translation into English verse of the Satires of Juvenal.

Rhodes was also a collector of dramatic literature and made large purchases when the Duke of Roxburghe's library was auctioned in June 1812. Rhodes's own library was sold by Sotheby's in 1825.
