= A Christmas Carol; or, Past, Present, and Future =

1844 play adaption of A Christmas Carol

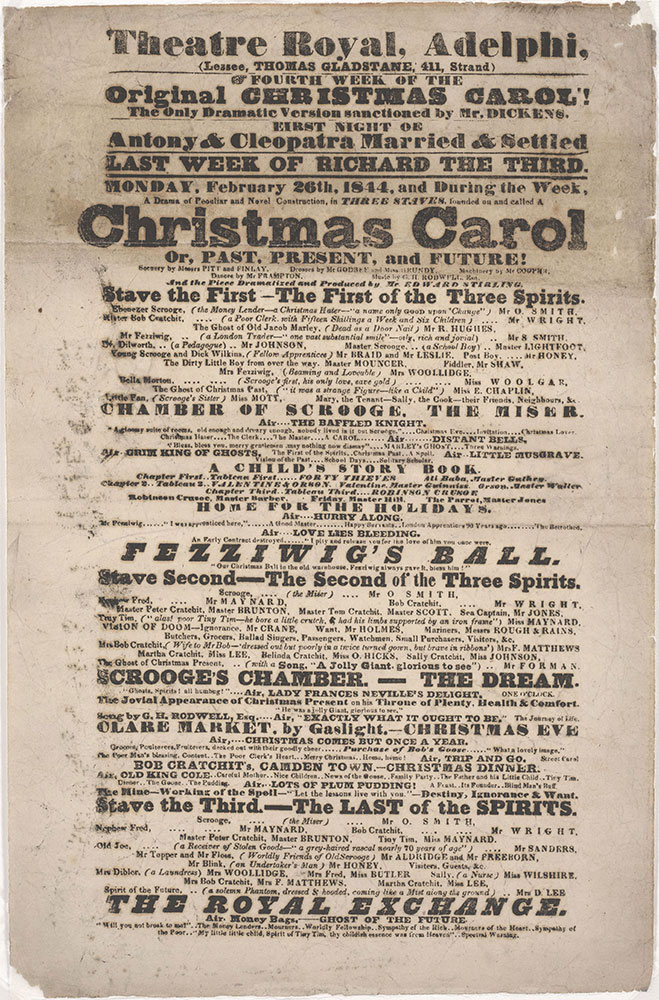
Playbill for Stirling's adaptation of A Christmas Carol (1844) performed at the Adelphi Theatre in the West End

A Christmas Carol; or, Past, Present, and Future is a play in three acts (or ‘Staves’) by Edward Stirling which opened at the Adelphi Theatre in the West End on 5 February 1844. Containing songs especially written for the show, the drama was adapted from the novella A Christmas Carol by Charles Dickens which had been published just weeks before in December 1843. By February 1844 eight other adaptations had already appeared on the London stage, including A Christmas Carol, or, the Miser's Warning! by C. Z. Barnett, which had opened at the Surrey Theatre in February 1844. Stirling's version, however, was the only production to be sanctioned by Dickens, who gave permission for the adaptation in January 1844.

Later, in his memoirs, Stirling wrote that Dickens came to several rehearsals during which he made 'valuable suggestions'. Dickens stated in his letters that he went to the Adelphi to see the production but had mixed feelings about it. Stirling revived his production in 1859.

Two woodcuts of scenes from the production, drawing heavily on the original illustrations by John Leech, were published in The Illustrated London News on 17 February 1844.

The critic of The Illustrated London News wrote of the production:

We have already given a slight sketch of this happy dramatic adaptation from Dickens's admirable "romance of real life;" we will now proceed to illustrate it, more through the graphical agency of our artist than by anything we could ourselves indite. Of the production itself, from which the theatrical representation has emanated, we have nothing to say, but "plaudits" from beginning to end: it exhibits the author not only as a caricaturist, but a philanthropist, a satirist, and, unlike the censors of old, a moralist. Neither Horace, Juvenal, nor Persius, could "touch the pitch" they wanted to make appear more black, "without defiling their own fingers," but Dickens is never corrupted by his subject; he stands aloof and "shoots Vice as well as Folly" when it obtrudes itself upon his universal surveillance, with--

An arrow shot by Virtue--barb'd by Wit.

A review of 10 February 1844, again in The Illustrated London News, stated:

Dickens is a great man — a moral chemist who has analyzed the human heart to a nicety. "Shewing the poison and the honey there."

His "Christmas Carol; or Past, Present, and Future," dramatised by Mr. Stirling in a most sterling manner, from the prose story of the modern Fielding, was produced on last Monday with most decided success. The acting of O. Smith, as old Scrooge, the miser, was, throughout, admirable. Wright as Bob Cratchit, the miser's clerk, presiding over his family party, was exceedingly droll. The story on which the piece is founded is too well known to enter into particulars of it: suffice it to say, that it is one of those home-bred, natural esculents that a true dramatic palate likes to enjoy, and as such, from its enthusiastic reception, will no doubt be universally relished, and ought to correct and improve the taste of those who fly to the Continent ** for what can be so abundantly supplied at home.

== Synopsis ==
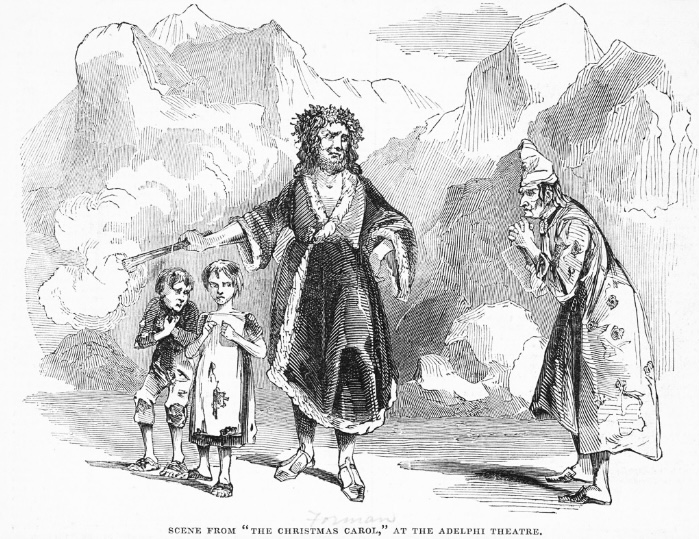
Scene from A Christmas Carol at the Adelphi Theatre - The Illustrated London News, Saturday, 17 February 1844

Miserly Ebenezer Scrooge is a harsh master to his clerk, Bob Cratchit. Uncaring and unfeeling, Scrooge lives a cold and solitary life mocking those who celebrate Christmas, including his nephew, Fred. On the evening of Christmas Eve Scrooge gets a visit from his long-dead partner, Jacob Marley, who warns him he is on the path to destruction. But visits from three Christmas Spirits may save him from that hellish fate.

== Scenes ==
=== Stave the First — The First of the Three Spirits ===
- Chamber of Scrooge the Miser
- A Child's Story Book
- Home for the Holidays
- Fezziwig's Ball

=== Stave the Second — The Second of the Three Spirits ===
- Scrooge's Chamber - The Dream
- Clare Market by Gaslight
- Christmas Eve
- Bob Cratchit's, Camden Town
- Christmas Dinner
- The Lighthouse and Open Sea.

=== Stave the Third — The Last of the Spirits ===
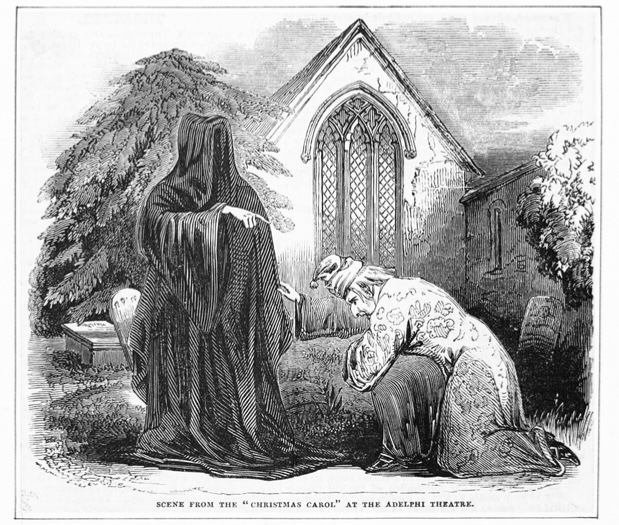
The Last of the Spirits - a scene from A Christmas Carol at the Adelphi Theatre - The Illustrated London News, Saturday, 17 February 1844

- The Desolate Churchyard
- The Miser's Grave
- Scrooge's Home - the Carol
- General Invitation to Everybody, and Tiny Tim's Blessing on us All

== Cast (1844) ==
=== Stave the First — The First of the Three Spirits ===
- Ebenezer Scrooge, (the Money Lender—a Christmas Hater- a name only GOOD upon ‘Change) - Mr. O. Smith
- Mister Bob Cratchit ... (a Poor Clerk with Fifteen Shillings a Week and Six Children) ... Edward Richard Wright
- The Ghost of Old Jacob Marley (Dead as a Door Nail) Mr. R. Hughes
- Mr. Fezziwig (a London Trader — “one vast substantial smile” — oily, rich and jovial) .. Mr. Stephen Smith
- Dr. Dilworth .. (a Pedagogue) .. Mr. Johnson
- Master Scrooge .. (a School Boy) .. Master Lightfoot
- Young Scrooge and Dick Wilkins (Fellow Apprentices) .. Mr. George R. Braid and Mr Leslie
- The Dirty Little Boy from over the Way .. Master Mouncer
- Post Boy .. Mr. Honey
- Fiddler .. Mr. Shaw
- Mrs. Fezziwig (Beaming and Lovable) .. Mrs. Woollidge
- Bella Morton (Scrooge's first, his only love, save gold) .. Miss Sarah Jane Woolgar
- The Ghost of Christmas Past (“it was a Strange Figure — like a Child”) .. Miss Ellen Chaplin
- Little Fan (Scrooge's Sister) .. Miss Mott
- Mary, the Tenant — Sally, the Cook — their Friends, Neighbours, &c

=== Stave the Second — The Second of the Three Spirits ===
- Nephew Fred .. Mr. George Maynard
- Master Peter Cratchit .. Master Brunton
- Master Tom Cratchit.. Master Scott
- Sea Captain .. Mr. Jones
- Tiny Tim (“alas poor Tiny Tim — he bore a little crutch, & had his limbs supported by an iron frame”) .. Miss Maynard
- Ignorance .. Mr. Crane
- Want .. Mr. Holmes
- Mariners .. Messrs. Rough & Rains
- Butchers, Grocers, Ballad Singers, Passengers, Watchmen, Small Purchasers, Visitors, &c
- Mrs. Bob Cratchit (Wife to Mr. Bob — “dressed out but poorly in a twice turned gown, but brave in ribbons”) .. Mrs. Frank Matthews
- Martha Cratchit .. Miss Lee
- Belinda Cratchit .. Miss O. Hicks
- Sally Cratchit .. Miss Johnson
- The Ghost of Christmas Present .. Mr. Forman

=== Stave the Third —- The Last of the Spirits ===
- Old Joe (a Receiver of Stolen Goods — “a grey-haired rascal nearly 70 years of age”) .. Mr. Sanders
- Mr. Topper and Mr. Floss (Worldly Friends of Old Scrooge) .. Mr. Aldridge and Mr. Freeborn
- Mr. Blink (an Undertaker's Man) .. Mr. Honey
- Mrs. Dibler (a Laundress) .. Mrs. Woollidge
- Mrs. Fred .. Miss Butler
- Sally (a Nurse) .. Miss Wilshire
- Spirit of the Future (a Solemn Phantom, dressed & hooded, coming like a Mist along the ground) .. Mrs. David Lee

== Cast (1859) ==
- Ebenezer Scrooge .. Charles Selby
- Mister Bob Cratchit .. J. L. Toole
- Nephew Fred .. John Billington
- The Ghost of Old Jacob Marley .. Thomas Stuart
- Mr. Fezziwig .. Christopher J. Smith
- Dr. Dilworth .. Robert Romer
- Master Scrooge .. Master Page
- Young Scrooge and Dick Wilkins .. William H. Eburne and Mr. Howard
- The Dirty Little Boy from over the Way .. Master George Lupino
- Fiddler .. Mr. Buckle
- Bella Morton .. Adeline Billington
- Little Fan .. Miss Morris
- Mrs. Fezziwig .. Louisa Chatterley
- The Ghost of Christmas Past .. Kate Kelly
- Master Tom Cratchit .. Master Craddock
- Master Peter Cratchit .. Miss Stoker
- Tiny Tim .. Miss Hamilton
- Ignorance - Vision of Doom .. Master Power
- Want - Vision of Doom .. Master Jones
- Mariners .. Messrs. Dry & Sims
- Mr. Topper and Mr. Floss .. William H. Eburne and Mr. Aldridge
- Old Joe .. Robert Romer
- Mr. Blink .. A. Powell
- Mrs. Bob Cratchit .. Sarah Jane Mellon (née Woolgar)
- Martha Cratchit .. Miss Hayman
- Belinda Cratchit .. Miss Craddock
- Sally Cratchit .. Miss Taylor
- The Ghost of Christmas Present .. Paul Bedford
- Sally .. Miss Aldridge
- Spirit of the Future .. Mr. Johnson
- Mrs. Fred .. Mrs. Laidlaw
- Mrs. Dibler .. Mrs. Stoker
