= Ghost of Christmas Present =

Fictional character by Charles Dickens

- A Christmas Carol character
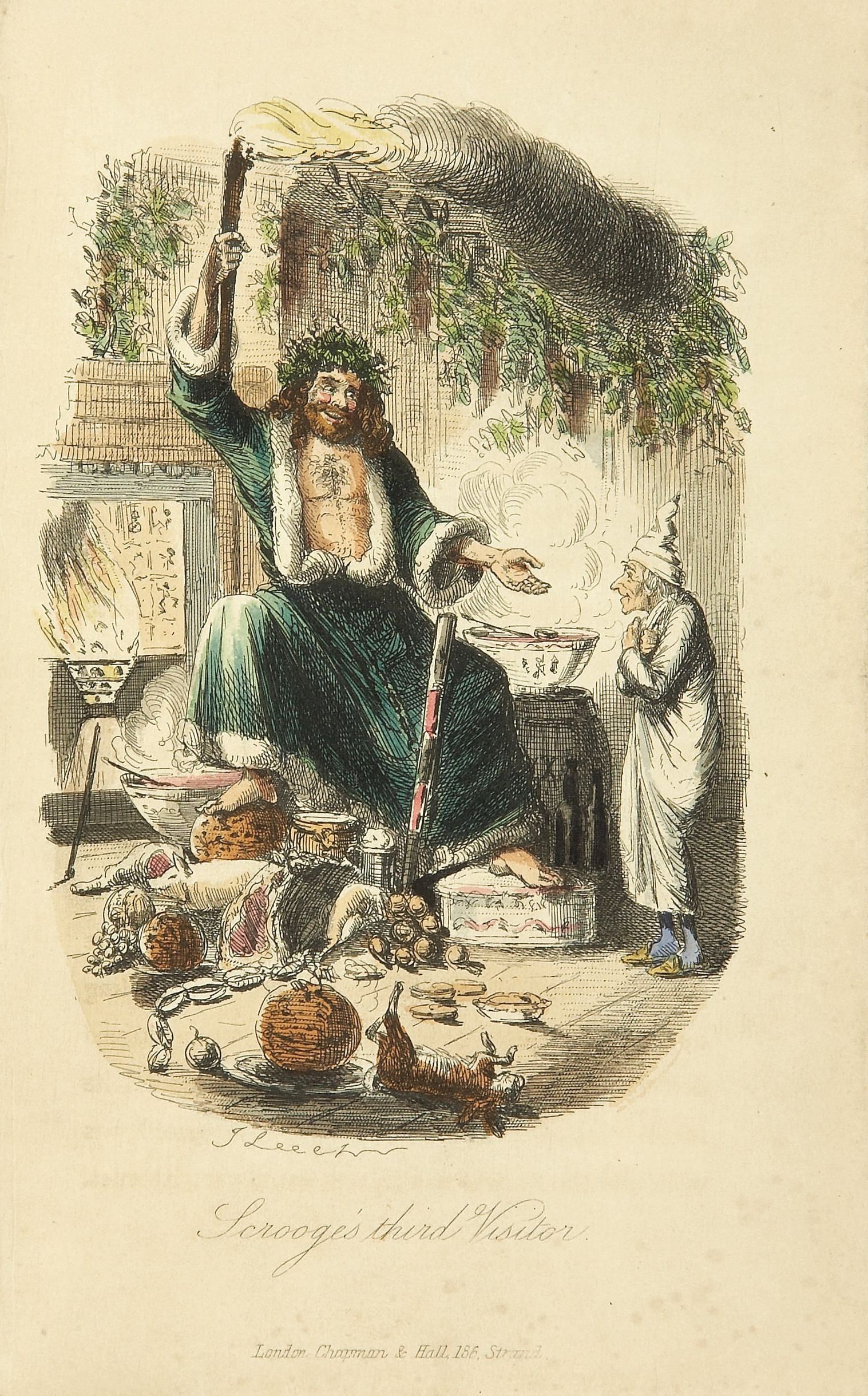
- The Ghost of Christmas Present and Ebenezer Scrooge - illustration by John Leech (1843).
- Created by: Charles Dickens
- Alias: Spirit of Christmas Present
- Species: Ghost
- Gender: Male (Note: When it is not referred to as "it", it is referred to as "he".)
- Occupation: Spirit of Christmas
- Relatives: Ghost of Christmas Past (forerunner); Ghost of Christmas Yet-to-Come (follower); Over 1800 unnamed elder brothers

The Ghost of Christmas Present is a fictional character in Charles Dickens' 1843 novella A Christmas Carol. The Ghost is one of three spirits that appear to miser Ebenezer Scrooge to offer him a chance of redemption.

Following a visit from the ghost of his deceased business partner, Jacob Marley, Scrooge receives nocturnal visits from three Ghosts of Christmas, each representing a different period in Scrooge's life. The Ghost of Christmas Present is concerned with Scrooge's current life and the present Christmas Day.

The Ghost of Christmas Present is presented as a personification of the Christmas spirit, and in the novella's first edition hand-coloured drawing by John Leech resembles early-Victorian images of Father Christmas. The spirit first appears to Scrooge on a throne made of traditional Christmas foodstuffs that would have been familiar to Dickens's more prosperous readers.

The spirit becomes the mouthpiece for Dickens's view on social reform and Christian charity: generosity and goodwill to all men – especially to the poor – and celebration of Christmas Day.

== Background ==
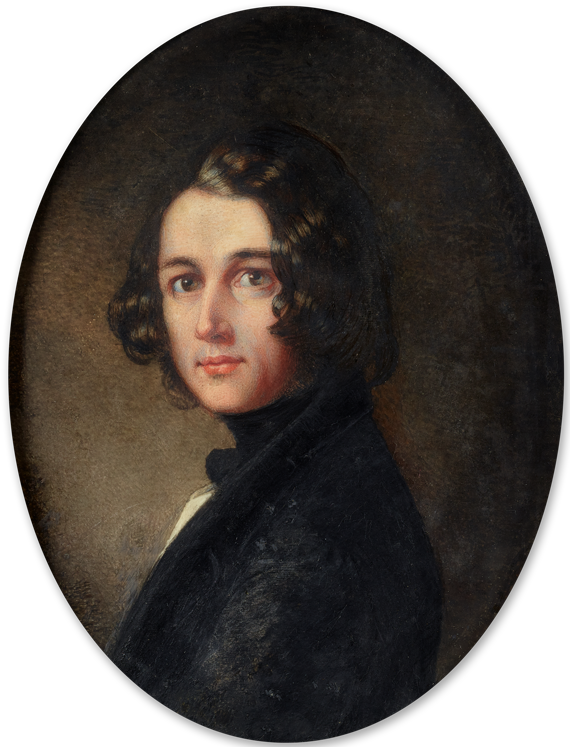
Dickens portrait by Margaret Gillies (1843), painted during the period when he was writing A Christmas Carol.

By early 1843 Dickens had been affected by the treatment of the poor and, in particular, the treatment of the children of the poor after witnessing children working in appalling conditions in a tin mine and following a visit to a ragged school. Indeed, Dickens experienced poverty as a boy when he was forced to work in a blacking factory after his father's imprisonment for debt. Originally intending to write a political pamphlet titled, An Appeal to the People of England, on behalf of the Poor Man's Child, he changed his mind and instead wrote A Christmas Carol which voiced his social concerns about poverty and injustice.

Dickens's friend and biographer John Forster said that Dickens had 'a hankering after ghosts', while not actually having a belief in them himself, and his journals Household Words and All the Year Round regularly featured ghost stories, with the novelist publishing an annual ghost story for some years after his first, A Christmas Carol, in 1843. In this novella, Dickens was innovative in making the existence of the supernatural a natural extension of the real world in which Scrooge and his contemporaries lived. Dickens making the Christmas Spirits a central feature of his story is a reflection of the early-Victorian interest in the paranormal.

== Origins ==
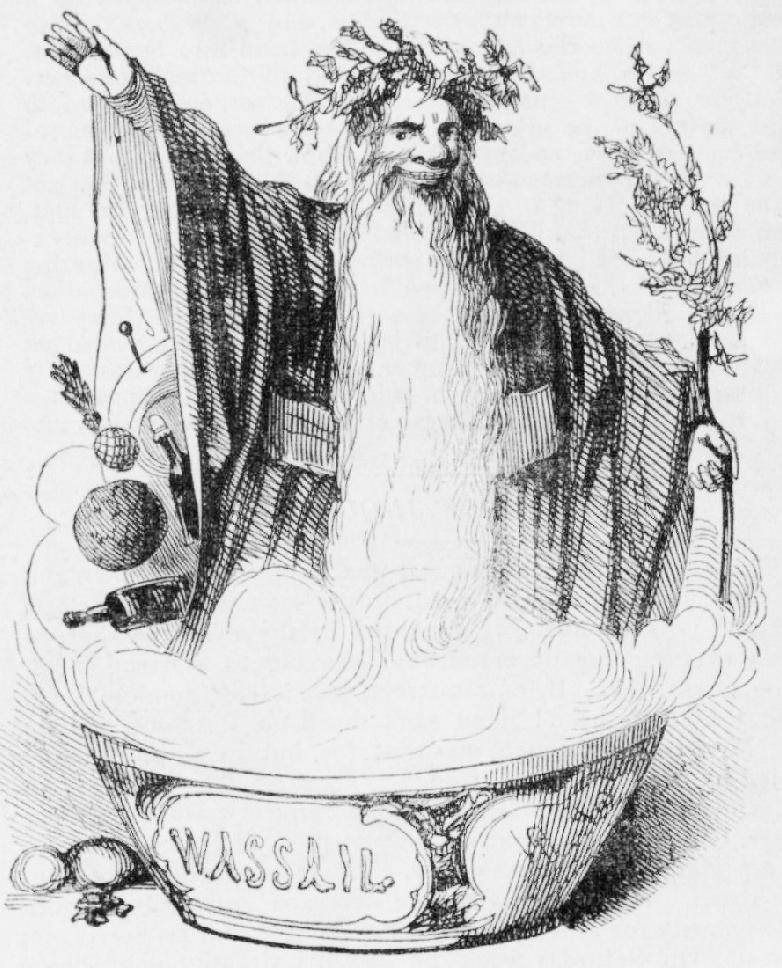
Engraving of Old Christmas 1842 - Illustrated London News (December 1842).

The Ghost of Christmas Present is described as "a jolly Giant", and Leech's hand-coloured illustration of the friendly and cheerful Spirit, his hand open in a gesture of welcome confronted by the amazed Scrooge has been described by Jane Rabb Cohen as elegantly combining "the ideal, real, and supernatural" with humour and sympathy. It is clear that the Spirit is based on Father Christmas, the ancient patriarchal figure associated with the English Christmas holiday, traditionally a bearded pagan giant depicted in a fur-lined evergreen robe wearing a crown of holly while holding mistletoe. Father Christmas, or Old Christmas, was often represented as surrounded by plentiful food and drink and started to appear regularly in illustrated magazines of the 1840s.

The American Santa Claus commemorated in the 1822 poem A Visit from St. Nicholas (better known as The Night Before Christmas) by Clement Clarke Moore is derived from his pagan English counterpart and the gift-giving Saint Nicholas of Myra, but the Ghost of Christmas Present should not be confused with the American version, who was little known in England before the early 1850s.

== Significance to the story ==
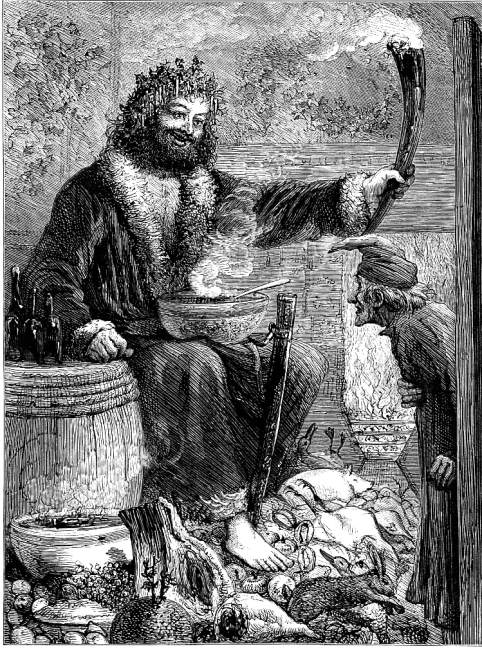
The Second of the Spirits - Sol Eytinge Jr. (1869).

As predicted by Jacob Marley, the second Spirit, the Ghost of Christmas Present, appears as the bell strikes one. While Scrooge is waiting to meet the second of the Spirits, 'nothing between a baby and a rhinoceros would have astonished him very much'. However, the appearance of the Spirit takes him by surprise, with its vision of opulence and the good things of Christmas, a vision of how Scrooge with all his wealth could be living, but chooses not to:

The moment Scrooge's hand was on the lock, a strange voice called him by his name, and bade him enter. He obeyed...

Heaped up on the floor, to form a kind of throne, were turkeys, geese, game, poultry, brawn, great joints of meat, sucking-pigs, long wreaths of sausages, mince-pies, plum-puddings, barrels of oysters, red-hot chestnuts, cherry-cheeked apples, juicy oranges, luscious pears, immense twelfth-cakes, and seething bowls of punch, that made the chamber dim with their delicious steam. In easy state upon this couch there sat a jolly Giant, glorious to see; who bore a glowing torch, in shape not unlike Plenty's horn, and held it up, high up, to shed its light on Scrooge as he came peeping round the door.

"Come in!" exclaimed the Ghost. "Come in! and know me better, man!"

Scrooge entered timidly, and hung his head before this Spirit. He was not the dogged Scrooge he had been; and, though the Spirit's eyes were clear and kind, he did not like to meet them.

"I am the Ghost of Christmas Present," said the Spirit. "Look upon me!"

Scrooge reverently did so. It was clothed in one simple deep green robe, or mantle, bordered with white fur. This garment hung so loosely on the figure, that its capacious breast was bare, as if disdaining to be warded or concealed by any artifice. Its feet, observable beneath the ample folds of the garment, were also bare; and on its head it wore no other covering than a holly wreath, set here and there with shining icicles. Its dark brown curls were long and free; free as its genial face, its sparkling eye, its open hand, its cheery voice, its unconstrained demeanour, and its joyful air. Girded round its middle was an antique scabbard; but no sword was in it, and the ancient sheath was eaten up with rust.

"You have never seen the like of me before!" exclaimed the Spirit.

Scrooge is more chastened in this Spirit's company than he was in the presence of the Ghost of Christmas Past and expresses his willingness to learn from any lesson the Spirit will show him. The Spirit takes Scrooge to the city streets with which Dickens himself was very familiar and which he paced each night while composing A Christmas Carol – 'past the areas of shabby genteel houses in Somers or Kentish Towns, watching the diners preparing or coming in'. Dickens incorporated these scenes into his novella. In the original manuscript, the Spirit refers to "my oldest brother", a clear reference to Jesus Christ and the first Christmas, but Dickens erased this reference before publication as being irreverent.

The Spirit shows Scrooge the joys and the hardships experienced by his fellow Man during one Christmas Day, that of the present, taking Scrooge to a joyous market with people buying the makings of Christmas dinner; to celebrations of Christmas in a miner's cottage, a lighthouse, and at his nephew Fred's Christmas party. A major part of this stave is taken up with Bob Cratchit and his family, who, although poor, love each other and delight in each other's company. During the family feast, we are introduced to Cratchit's youngest son, Tiny Tim, who, despite his disability, remains full of Christian spirit and happiness. The Spirit informs Scrooge that Tiny Tim will die unless the course of events changes, echoing Scrooge's own words he had earlier used to the two men who were collecting for charity, "If he be like to die, he had better do it, and decrease the surplus population."

Scrooge notices that the Spirit

notwithstanding his gigantic size [is able to] accommodate himself to any place with ease ... He stood beneath a low roof quite as gracefully and like a super-natural creature, as it was possible he could have done in any lofty hall.

The Rev. Geoffrey Rowell has observed that the stooping of the Ghost of Christmas Present is a reflection of the New Testament's statement that God stooped down to be born in human form in the Incarnation at Bethlehem.

=== Sabbath dinners of the poor ===
When the Ghost of Christmas Present shows Scrooge the dinners of the poor being cooked in a local bakery, the houses of the poor at that time being ill-equipped for cooking, seeing the Spirit as representing God and Christianity Scrooge accuses him of wanting to close such bakeries on the Sabbath which would have resulted in the poor having no hot food that day.

The Sunday shuttering of businesses was of great importance to Dickens at that time: Several public figures wanted to keep the Sabbath holy by banning secular work on Sundays, which meant closing the bakeries. Among these Sabbatarians was the MP Sir Andrew Agnew (1793–1849), who introduced a Sunday Observance Bill in the House of Commons four times between 1832 and 1837, none of which passed. It was Agnew's third attempt which drew on him the wrath of Dickens; Dickens' pamphlet in response is largely a personal attack on Agnew, who wished to not only close the bakeries but also to limit other "innocent enjoyments" of people experiencing poverty. The passing of the Bill, had it been successful, would not have affected the hot meals or amusements of the better-off on Sundays. Dickens wrote,

"Sir Andrew Agnew ... generally speaking, eat(s) pretty comfortable dinners all the week through, and cannot be expected to understand what people feel, who only have a meat dinner on one day out of seven."

Dickens later supported the National Sunday League, which campaigned to relax Sunday restrictions further.

In the novella, Scrooge points out to the Spirit that the actions of the Sabbatarians "... has been done in your name, or at least that of your family". This is a revealing comment, as it shows that God sent the Spirits for Scrooge's redemption and that Dickens, therefore, intended A Christmas Carol as a Christian allegory. In the Gospel of Mark, the disciples of Jesus pluck the heads off grain to eat as they walked by some fields. They are accused of breaking Sabbath rules concerning resting on the Sabbath because plucking the grain was considered food preparation. Jesus replied,

"The Sabbath was made for man, not man for the Sabbath."

Dickens himself professed to be a Christian, but it is hard to pigeonhole his faith into any particular sectarian branch of 19th century Christianity. The Spirit responds:

There are some on this earth of yours ... who lay claim to know us, and who do their deeds of passion, pride, ill-will, hatred, envy, bigotry, and selfishness in our name, who are as strange to us and all our kith and kin, as if they had never lived. Remember that, and charge their doings on themselves, not us.

The Spirit's words point out to Scrooge that many hypocritically claim religious justification for their un-Christian actions, which adversely affect the lives of people experiencing poverty. He states that men should be judged by the morality of their deeds and not by the religious justification for them.

=== Ignorance and Want ===
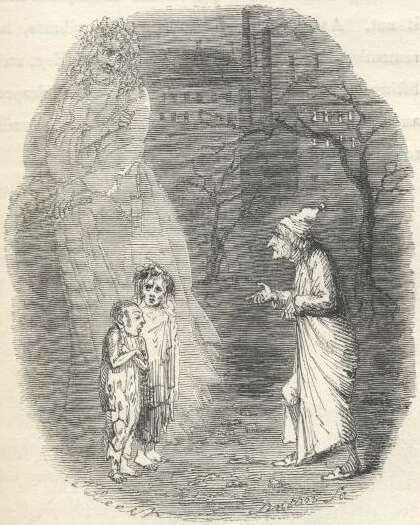
"Scrooge encounters Ignorance and Want", illustration (1843) John Leech.

The Spirit grows visibly older as his time with Scrooge passes, as he explains, "My life upon this globe, is very brief...it ends to-night...at midnight", but before disappearing Scrooge observes two hideous and emaciated children – Ignorance and Want – crouching beneath the robe of the Spirit.

"Oh, Man! look here! Look, look, down here!" exclaimed the Ghost.

They were a boy and girl. Yellow, meagre, ragged, scowling, wolfish; but prostrate, too, in their humility.

Dickens intends the two as a warning to Scrooge and Mankind of the consequences of ignoring the needs of the poor - and poor children in particular:

"Spirit! are they yours?" Scrooge could say no more.

"They are Man's", said the Spirit, looking down upon them. "And they cling to me, appealing from their fathers. This boy is Ignorance. This girl is Want. Beware them both, and all of their degree, but most of all beware this boy, for on his brow I see that written which is Doom, unless the writing be erased. Deny it!" cried the Spirit, stretching out its hand towards the city. "Slander those who tell it ye! Admit it for your factious purposes, and make it worse. And bide the end!"

"Have they no refuge or resource?" cried Scrooge.

"Are there no prisons?" said the Spirit, turning on him for the last time with his own words. "Are there no workhouses?"

The Spirit thus reminds the reader that poverty is not a problem of the past or the future but also the present and mocks Scrooge's concern for their welfare before disappearing at midnight.

Dickens was to reiterate his warning about the treatment of people experiencing poverty in a speech he delivered at the Polytechnic Institute in Birmingham on 28 February 1844, shortly after the publication of A Christmas Carol. In a metaphor taken from 'The Genii in the Bottle' from The Arabian Nights he said,

"Now, there is a spirit of great power, the Spirit of Ignorance, long shut up in a vessel of Obstinate Neglect, with a great deal of lead in its composition, and sealed with the seal of many, many Solomons, and which is exactly in the same position. Release it in time, and it will bless, restore, and reanimate society; but let it lie under the rolling waves of years, and its blind revenge at last will be destruction."

== Notable portrayals ==
=== Film ===
The character does not appear in Scrooge, or, Marley's Ghost (1901), the first film version of the story.

- Richard L'Estrange in The Right to Be Happy (1916)
- Oscar Asche in Scrooge (1935)
- Lionel Braham in A Christmas Carol (1938)
- Francis de Wolff in Scrooge (1951)
- Kenneth More in Scrooge (1970)
- Felix Felton (voice) in A Christmas Carol (1971)
- Will Ryan (Willie the Giant) in Mickey's Christmas Carol (1983)
- Carol Kane in Scrooged (1988)
- Jerry Nelson (face and voice) in The Muppet Christmas Carol (1992)
- Whoopi Goldberg (voice) in A Christmas Carol (1997)
- Michael Gambon (voice) in Christmas Carol: The Movie (2001)
- Keith Wickham (voice) in A Christmas Carol (2006)
- Jim Carrey (voice and motion capture) in A Christmas Carol (2009)
- Justin Edwards in The Man Who Invented Christmas (2017)
- Daniel Kaluuya in A Christmas Carol (2020)
- Will Ferrell in Spirited (2022)
- Trevor Dion Nicholas (voice) in Scrooge: A Christmas Carol.

=== Television ===
- Les Tremayne (voice) in Mister Magoo's Christmas Carol (1962)
- Bernhard Lee in Scrooge (1977)
- Paul Frees (voice) in The Stingiest Man in Town (1978)
- Edward Woodward in A Christmas Carol (1984)
- Brian Cummings (voice) in A Flintstones Christmas Carol (1994)
- Desmond Barrit in A Christmas Carol (1999)
- Ray Fearon in A Christmas Carol (2000)
- John Taylor in A Diva's Christmas Carol (2000)
- Maurice LaMarche (Yosemite Sam) in Bah, Humduck! A Looney Tunes Christmas (2006)
- David Tennant in Nan's Christmas Carol (2009)
- Karen Gillan (as Amy Pond filling the role in the Doctor's plan) in the Doctor Who episode "A Christmas Carol" (2010)
- Andrea Libman in the My Little Pony: Friendship Is Magic episode "A Hearth's Warming Tail" (2016) (Note: Technically the Ghost of Christmas Presents, referring to gifts in a play on words.)
- Charlotte Riley in A Christmas Carol (2019)
- Matthew Clarke in Christmas Above the Clouds (2025). He appears as a pilot.

=== Musicals ===
- Stratford Johns in Scrooge (1992)
- Ken Jennings in A Christmas Carol (1994)

=== Plays ===
- Paul Bedford in A Christmas Carol; or, Past, Present, and Future (1844)
- Patrick Stewart (all characters) in A Christmas Carol (1991)
- Golda Rosheuvel / Nichola Hughes / Gloria Onitiri / Golda Rosheuvel / LaChanze in A Christmas Carol (2017-2025)

== See also ==
- Jacob Marley
- Ghost of Christmas Past
- Ghost of Christmas Yet to Come

== Sources ==
- Ackroyd, Peter (1990). Dickens. London: Sinclair-Stevenson. ISBN 978-1-85619-000-8.
- Callow, Simon (2009). Dickens' Christmas: A Victorian Celebration. London: Frances Lincoln. ISBN 978-0-7112-3031-6.
- Childs, Peter; Tredell, Nicolas (2006). Charles Dickens. Basingstoke, Hampshire: Palgrave Macmillan. ISBN 978-1-4039-1919-9.
- Ledger, Sally (2007). Dickens and the Popular Radical Imagination. Cambridge: Cambridge University Press. ISBN 978-0-521-84577-9.
- Lee, Imogen. "Ragged Schools". British Library. Archived from the original on 15 July 2014.
