= Edward Wright (cricketer, born 1874) =

English cricketer

Personal information
- Full name: Edward Campbell Wright
- Born: 23 April 1874; South Shields, County Durham
- Died: 28 July 1947 (aged 73); Budleigh Salterton, Devon
- Batting: Right-handed
- Bowling: Right-arm slow

Domestic team information
- Years: Team
- 1894–1898: Gloucestershire
- 1897–1898: Oxford University
- 1902: Kent
- FC debut: 20 August 1894 Gloucestershire v Yorkshire
- Last FC: 19 May 1902 Kent v Essex

Career statistics
Competition	First-class
Matches	23
Runs scored	420
Batting average	15.55
100s/50s	0/1
Top score	83
Balls bowled	2,578
Wickets	52
Bowling average	22.09
5 wickets in innings	1
10 wickets in match	0
Best bowling	5/44
Catches/stumpings	17/–
- Source: CricInfo, 23 October 2023

Edward Campbell Wright (23 April 1874 – 28 July 1947) was an English schoolmaster and cricketer who played for Gloucestershire, Oxford University and Kent between 1894 and 1902.

Wright was born at South Shields in County Durham, the son of a Church of England clergyman. His father died in 1880 and Wright was educated at the Clergy Orphan School in Canterbury where he played cricket.

Wright made his first-class cricket debut for Gloucestershire in 1894, playing in a County Championship match against Yorkshire at the Ashley Down Ground in Bristol. He scored 17 runs, including 16 in his second innings, and did not take a wicket on debut. He did not play any other first-class matches until going up to Keble College, Oxford in 1896. A century and six wickets in the 1897 Freshmen's match saw him brought into the University First XI, playing eight top-level matches during the season, including the 1897 University Match―his only Blue. He took 25 first-class wickets for Oxford during the season and played three top-level matches for Gloucestershire.

The following season Wright made six first-class appearances, three for Oxford and three for Gloucestershire, whilst in 1899 he played three times for Oxford. By 1901 he was working as a teacher at the Clergy Orphan School and in 1902 played his final two first-class matches, appearing for Kent against Middlesex at Lord's and Essex at Leyton. He played no significant cricket after this. In his 23 first-class matches he scored 420 runs and took 52 wickets.

Wright worked for 35 years at Christ's Hospital School at Horsham in Sussex where he took charge of the school cricket team. He died at Budleigh Salterton in Devon in 1947 aged 73.

== Bibliography ==
- Carlaw, Derek (2020). Kent County Cricketers, A to Z: Part One (1806–1914) (PDF). Cardiff: ACS.
