= Edward W. Wright =

American Presbyterian pastor (1817–1866)

- Born: April 1817; Lancaster
- Died: September 17, 1866 (aged 48–49)
- Alma mater: Miami University; Princeton Theological Seminary; Western Theological Seminary
- Occupation: Pastor; librarian

Edward Weekly "E. W." Wright (April 1817 – September 17, 1866), D.D. a Presbyterian divine, was born at Lancaster, Ohio in April, 1817. He was educated at Miami University; studied divinity at the Princeton Theological Seminary, and finished in the Western Theological Seminary at Allegheny, Pa., in 1838; was licensed and ordained as an evangelist by Logansport Presbytery in October, 1839; became pastor of the Church at Lafayette, Ind., in 1840; agent in the West for the Presbyterian Board of Education in 1845; pastor of the Church in Delphi in 1846, which relation continued for a period of twenty years.

The Church grew and became a feeder to new churches beyond. He was stated clerk of the Synod of Northern Indiana from the time of its formation in 1842 until his removal to Allegheny, and also of the Presbytery of Logansport for about the same length of time. It was generally admitted that, "as a presbyter, he had no equal in all the synod." At length he was elected and served as librarian of the Board of Colportage of Pittsburgh and Allegheny synods, and soon afterwards he removed his family to Allegheny. He died Sept. 17, 1866. Dr. Wright was an instructive preacher: "He did not appeal to the sympathies or the passions, but rather to the reason and the consciences of the people. He took no crude materials into the pulpit; his sermons always afforded proof of patient and prayerful study, and they were delivered in a solemn and reverential manner." See Wilson, Presb. Hist. Almanac, 1867, p. 219.
