= Bombastes Furioso =

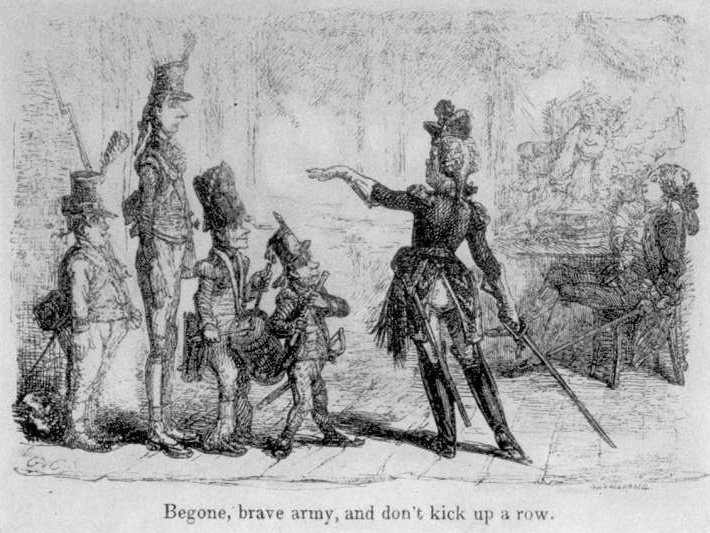
Frontispiece by George Cruikshank, for 1837 edition of Bombastes Furioso

Bombastes Furioso, subtitled A Burlesque Tragic Opera, was written in 1810 by William Barnes Rhodes (sometimes credited as Thomas Barnes Rhodes). The first authorized printed edition was published in 1822. It is a drama with comic songs, that satirizes the bombastic style of other tragedies that were in fashion at the time.

It was very popular throughout the 19th century—its popularity was sufficient for two quotations to appear in Bartlett's Familiar Quotations, and for Lewis Carroll to refer to it in his poem "Melancholetta".

The part of Bombastes was first played by Richard John Smith.

== Characters ==
- Artaxaminous – King of Utopia
- Fusbos – Minister of State
- Bombastes – general of Artaxaminous
- Distaffina – troth-plight (fiancé) of General Bombastes

== Plot ==
King Artaxaminous wishes to divorce his wife Griskinissa, and marry Distaffina. Distaffina, however, is betrothed to General Bombastes. Artaxaminous promises Distaffina "half a crown" if she will forsake the general for him. Distaffina is unable to resist, and abandons Bombastes. When the general learns of this, he goes mad, hangs his boots on the branch of a tree, and challenges anyone who would remove them. Artaxaminous cuts the boots down, and the general kills him. Fusbos, coming upon this, kills Bombastes. At the end of the drama, the dead men jump up and promise "to die again tomorrow", if the audience desires it.

== Notes ==
The story of Bombastes Furioso is based in part on Orlando Furioso.

The sign that Bombastes places on the tree with his boots reads:

Who dares this pair of boots displace,
Must meet Bombastes face to face.

According to Bartlett, this is a reference to a quote from Don Quixote:

Let none but he these arms displace,
Who dares Orlando's fury face.

(This itself is a reference to Orlando Furioso.)
