= Edward Wright (cricketer, born 1945) =

English cricketer (born 1945)

Personal information
- Born: 3 May 1945 (age 81); Shipdham, Norfolk, England
- Height: 6 ft 5 in (1.96 m)
- Batting: Right-handed
- Bowling: Left-arm fast-medium

Domestic team information
- Years: Team
- 1969–1982: Norfolk
- Source: Cricinfo, 29 June 2011

Edward Wright (born 3 May 1945) is an English former cricketer. Wright was a right-handed batsman who bowled left-arm fast-medium. He was born in Shipdham, Norfolk.

Wright made his debut for Norfolk in the 1969 Minor Counties Championship against Cambridgeshire. Wright played Minor counties cricket for Norfolk from 1969 to 1982, making 72 Minor Counties Championship appearances. He made his only List A appearance in 1982 against Leicestershire in the NatWest Trophy. He wasn't required to bat in the match, but did bowl 9 wicket-less overs for the cost of 19 runs.
