= Paul Bedford =

English comedian (1792?–1871)

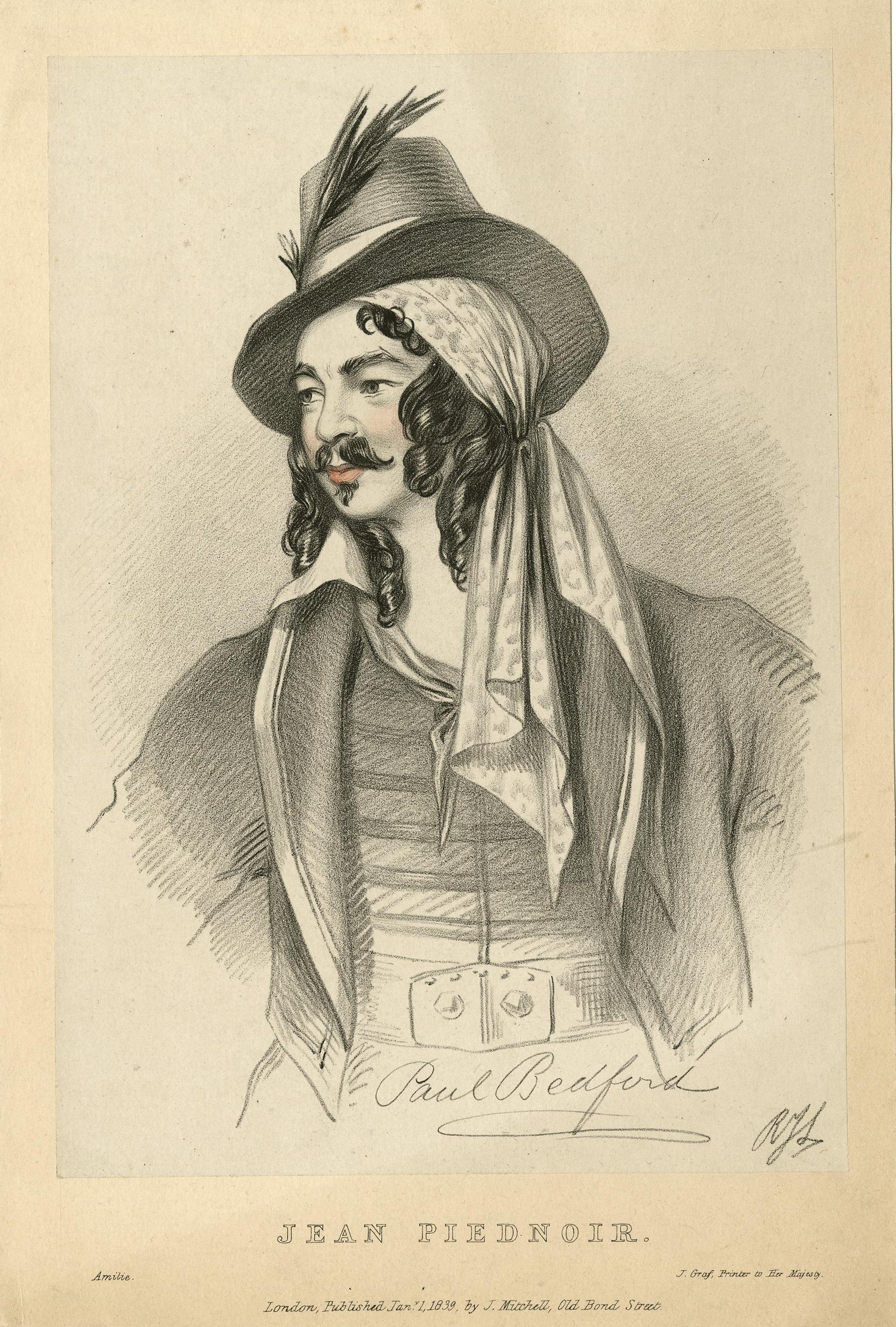
- 1839 lithograph as Jean Piednoir in Amilie, or the Love Test
- Born: 1792
- Died: 1871 (aged 78–79)

Paul John Bedford (1792?–1871), was an English comedian.

== Life and career ==
Bedford states, in his gossiping book of Recollections and Wanderings, that he was born in Bath, and entered upon the stage through the customary portal of amateur theatricals.

His first appearance was made at Swansea. After playing at Southampton, Portsmouth, and other towns in the south of England, he obtained an engagement in Bath. The first printed mention of him in connection with this city which can be traced is 19 May 1819, when for his benefit he played Don Guzman in Giovanni in London. At this period he had probably been a member of the company four or five years. A reference to his playing with Kean in Richard III which appears in his "Recollections", points to the spring of 1815 as the time of his first appearance. He then proceeded to Dublin as one of a company engaged by Henry Harris of Covent Garden to play in the new theatre in that city. Among the company was Miss Green, an actress of little reputation, who subsequently made her first appearance in London with Bedford as Mrs. Bedford. The period of the Dublin migration appears to have been 1820. Two successive tours in Scotland with Madame Catalani followed, without breaking the Dublin engagement, which only ended when Bedford accepted an offer from Sir Henry Bishop for Drury Lane. Bedford's first appearance at this theatre took place as Hawthorn in 'Love in a Village', 2 November 1824, Mrs. Bedford, late Miss Green, playing Rosetta. The occasion was also signalised by the first appearance of Terry, who took the character of Justice Woodcock. On the 10th of the same month Bedford played Bernhard, head ranger of the forest, in Soane's version of Der Freischütz, the fifth and the most successful adaptation of Weber's great opera which that year had achieved. Soon afterwards he was promoted to Caspar in the same opera. Through successive managements of Elliston, Price, Polhill and Lee, and lastly Bunn, Bedford kept a position chiefly due to his vocal capacity. In 1833 he joined, still as a singer, the company at Covent Garden under Macready, appearing in Fra Diavolo, Gustavus III, and other operas.

With his engagement at the Adelphi, then (1838) under the management of Yates, the later and better known phase of Bedford's popularity commenced. Blueskin, in Jack Sheppard, 1839, added to a reputation which attained its climax in Jack Gong in the Green Bushes, 1845, and the Kinchin Cove in the 'Flowers of the Forest', 1847. During many years he played second low-comedy parts at the Adelphi, with Edward Wright first, and after his death with Mr. Toole. During the Christmas period of 1859-60 at that theatre he played the Ghost of Christmas Present in A Christmas Carol; or, Past, Present, and Future. Bedford was a sound and trustworthy actor of the rollicking sort. His figure and his voice formed a conspicuous portion of his stock in art. Recalling his singing in Adelphi farces, in a whole series of which he appeared, one is apt to forget that he obtained reputation in Lablache's great character of Don Pasquale. A farewell benefit was given him at the Queen's Theatre, 18 May 1868, when he played for the last time the Kinchin Cove in a selection from Flowers of the Forest. He had then been above fifty years on the stage.

== Death ==
He died of a dropsical complication about 10 pm Wednesday, 11 January 1871, at Lindsey Place, Chelsea, and was buried in Norwood Cemetery. (Note: Genest's Account of the English Stage) (Note: Recollections and Wanderings of Paul Bedford, 1864) (Note: Era newspaper, 15 January 1871) (Note: The Drama, vols. iii. and vii.)
