= Charles Dillon (actor-manager) =

English actor-manager and tragedian

Charles J. Dillon (1819 – 27 June 1881) was an English actor-manager and tragedian.

In 1840, he appeared at the City Theatre, London, as Hamlet, giving a performance which attracted some critical attention. He toured extensively, to improve his reputation. Becoming actor-manager of the Theatre Royal, Wolverhampton in 1848, in partnership with comedian Henry Widdicombe. In 1856, at age 37, he returned to London, acting at Sadler's Wells, his success was decisive. From "the Wells" he went to the Lyceum, where he became manager on 29 September 1856, becoming manager of the Theatre Royal, Drury Lane in 1857.

In 1860–61, he left England with his wife, Clara, for a tour around the world. Their first stop was America, and on 18 April 1861 he appeared at the Winter Garden, as Belphégor. (Note: The play Belphégor the Mountebank was written for Frédérick Lemaître by Adolphe d'Ennery and the English version by Charles Webb, made famous by Dillon, became a 1921 silent film) The American Civil War was underway at that time, affecting trade in the theatres. In California he was well received, performing for 100 consecutive nights at the Metropolitan Theatre, San Francisco. Their next stop was Australia, and Mr and Mrs Dillon and child arrived in Melbourne, by the ship Torrent, in October 1862. Mrs Dillon's first appearance on the Australian stage was at the Royal Haymarket in February 1863. Later that month she played Ophelia to Dillon's Prince Hamlet at the Lyceum. They spent two years touring Australia, Tasmania being their last engagement. In December 1864 Mr and Mrs Dillon and daughter left for New Zealand, then returned to America and filled engagements throughout the country, reaching New York City in the spring of 1866. On 16 May he appeared at Niblo's Garden, as Belphégor. His subsequent tours of American cities were managed by George Wood, but they were not successful, and the family returned to England, where they continuing to tour until his death.

== Personal life ==
Dillon had two sons and a daughter – with a woman named Silver – they also entered the theatre. Charles Silver, who adopted the name Dillon, constructed and owned the Theatre Royal Stratford East in 1884.

The elder Dillon married Clara Conquest (1826–4 July 1888), daughter of Benjamin Oliver Conquest, manager of the Garrick and Grecian Theatres, where her mother was ballet master. Her own stage career began at the Garrick, and she assumed leading juvenile roles at the Grecian. Together, they had one daughter, Clara, who married the actor Henry George.

Dillon suddenly dropped dead 27 June 1881 in the main street of Hawick, having played Othello the previous night. His remains are buried in Brompton Cemetery, London. Mrs Dillon died 4 July 1888, in Portsmouth.

A son, W. C. Dillon, also known for playing Belphégor, "trod the boards" in Australia 1877–1881 before returning to England, where he failed to live up to expectations.
