= Farren =

Farren is both a surname and a given name. Notable people with the name include:

== Surname ==
- Charlie Farren (born 1953), American musician
- Daniel Farren (1848–?), Irish-born soldier in the U.S. Army
- Elizabeth Farren (c. 1759 – 1829), English actress
- Fred Farren, English footballer
- George Farren (1874–1956), English cricketer
- Henry Farren (1826?–1860), English actor who settled in America, and theatre manager
- J. Michael Farren (born 1953), American attorney and public servant in two U.S. presidential administrations
- Mark Farren (1982–2016), Irish footballer
- Mick Farren (1943–2013), English journalist, author and singer
- Nellie Farren (1848–1904), English actress
- Paul Farren (born 1960), American NFL professional football player 1983–1991
- Robert Farren (1909–1985), Irish poet
- Sean Farren (born 1939), member and minister in the Northern Ireland Legislative Assembly
- William Farren (1786–1861), English actor
- William Farren Jr. (1825–1908), English actor, son of William Farren

== Given name ==
- Farren Blackburn, British film and television director and scriptwriter
- Farren Ray (born 1986), Australian rules footballer
