= Faucit =

Faucit is the surname of several people:

- John Faucit Saville (1783?–1853), English actor, known as Mr Faucit
- Harriet Elizabeth Savill (1789–1857), English actress, known as Mrs Faucit
- Helena Faucit (1817–1898), English actress
