= Stollman =

Stollman is a surname, likely of Dutch and Jewish origin. Notable people with the surname include:

- Aryeh Lev Stollman (born 1954), American writer and physician
- Bernard Stollman (1929–2015), American lawyer
- Isaac Stollman (1897–1980), Russian rabbi, author, and Zionist leader
- Noah Stollman (born 1966), Israeli screenwriter and television producer
- Phillip Stollman (c. 1906–1998), Soviet-American real estate developer, Zionist, and philanthropist

== See also ==
- Stollmann
