= William Farren (disambiguation) =

William Farren (1786–1861) was an English stage actor.

William Farren also refers to:

- William Farren (actor, born 1754), 18th-century stage actor
- William Farren Jr. (1825–1908), English actor
- William Scott Farren (1892–1970), British aeronautical engineer
