= Royal Lyceum (Toronto) =

Live theatre in Toronto, Canada

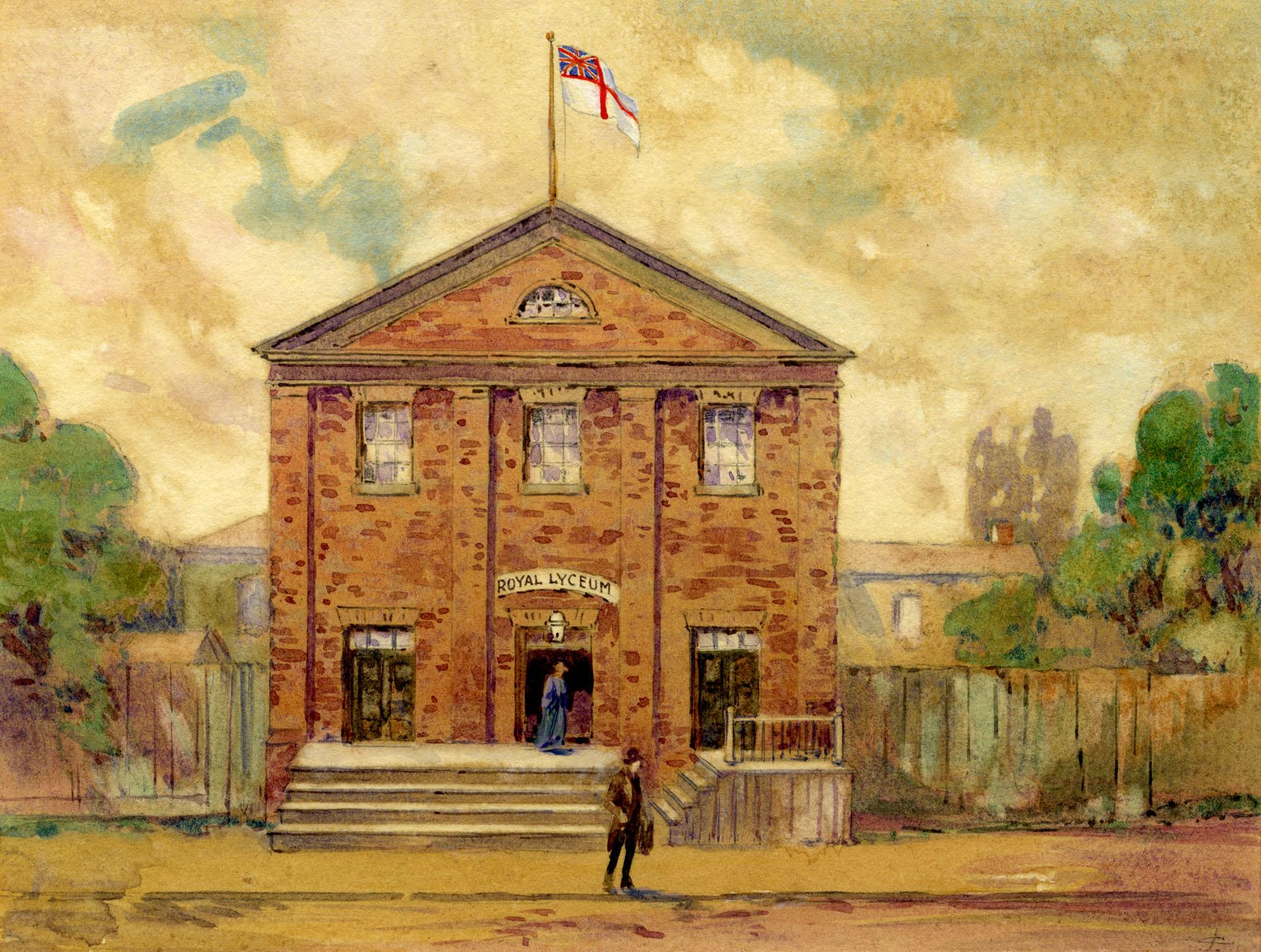
- Theatre circa 1858
- Interactive map of Royal Lyceum
- Location: 99 1/2 King Street West, Toronto, Canada West
- Coordinates: 43.6479313°N 79.3828164°W
- Capacity: 750

Construction
- Opened: 1848
- Closed: January 1874 due to fire

Royal Lyceum was a live theatre and opera house in Toronto, Canada West (later Ontario), Canada. Built in 1848, it was the first purpose-built live theatre venue in the town. Beginning in the 1860s, it housed Toronto's first opera company, that of George Holman, who also managed the theatre. It burnt down in 1874 and was rebuilt as the Royal Opera House, eventually being finally destroyed by fire in 1883. Its address was 99 1/2 King Street West between Bay Street and York Street on the south side of the street. The hall was accessed by Theatre Lane, as the actual hall was one block south, on Wellington Street. The location is now the site of the Toronto-Dominion Centre.

== History ==
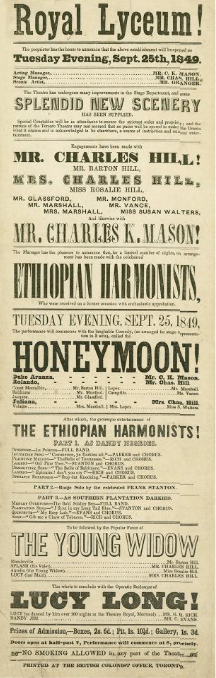
Listing of 1849 performance at Royal Lyceum

Opera and live theatre in York and early Toronto was first performed in ballrooms, outdoors, civic halls and converted shops. The first American touring companies started performing in Toronto in the mid-1820s. Franks' Hotel on Market Lane (now Colborne Street) is known to have had performances of "Colman's justly admired" opera of Mountaineers, Or Love and Madness in December 1825 in its second-floor Assembly Room. In 1839, a carpentry shop was converted to a hall, known as the "Theatre Royal" on King Street at York. It, like many buildings of the time, was destroyed by fire a few years later. In 1842, Deering's Theatre, a converted storehouse, briefly operated at Scott and Front Street. After this, opera is known to have been performed open air, and at the City Hall on Front (now St. Lawrence Market South) to opera enthusiasts.

John Ritchey constructed the first purpose-built theatre in Toronto, and likely in Canada West, from 1847 to 1848. The two-storey brick building was leased to T.P. Besnard to manage. The theatre had an orchestra pit, balcony, dressing rooms and was gaslit. The seating was primitive, on pew-like benches. The theatre opened on December 28, 1848 with a 'philharmonic performance'. The theatre was described as being able to seat up to 700 comfortably.

On January 16, 1849, the hall had its first performance of live theatre, composing of excerpts "Celebrated Pieces, Songs &c" performed by the Hamilton Amateur Theatrical Society, and 'distinguished amateurs' of Toronto. The first operatic performance was on June 20, 1849, with selections from Daughter of the Regiment, followed by two further performances: a selection from Donizetti's The Elixir of Love by a Miss Brianti, Mr. Manvers and Mrs. Clark. Tickets were 2s. 6d for boxes, pit 1s. 10d and gallery 1s. 3d. (this being before Canadian currency existed). and a final night presenting selections of Lucia di Lammermoor.

Starting in 1851, the Royal Lyceum was leased by the Nickinson Theatre Company for live theatre. The company was owned, managed and acted in by John Nickinson, who also toured the company. His daughter Charlotte acted in their performances, and later managed the company starting in 1871 when her father died. Plays ranged from Shakespeare and Sheridan to Uncle Tom's Cabin and The Lady of Lyons, plus visiting stars, opera companies and minstrel shows. An economic depression in the 1850s affected audiences leading to financial failure by Nickinson in 1859. The theatre continued under other managers, through a succession of closings and revivals in the early 1860s. The quantity and quality of productions declined. The theatre's fortunes turned around later in the 1860s when the economy improved and the theatre was leased by George Holman in 1867.

George Holman's opera company originated through his family backing touring singers in well-known operas at the Royal Lyceum. In 1858, the opera company of Henry Charles Cooper and Annie Milner of England, brought their orchestra and performed with George Holman and his wife in supporting roles in La Somnambula, The Bohemian Girl, Lucia di Lammermoor and Ill Trovatore. Starting in 1864, Holman's opera troupe performed full operas at the Royal Lyceum. In 1867, the company put on a seven-week season, in 1868, they put on a 17-week season, 14 weeks in 1869, five months in 1870 and seasons in 1871 and 1872. The period under Holman was the theatre's peak, with full houses, a good deal of opera and current new plays from London and New York. Holman's lease ended in 1872.

The theatre was also used for amateur theatre produced by the military regiments stationed in Toronto. The military theatre co-operated with professional theatre troupes. In one performance in 1862 by the 30th Regiment, the professional actresses of Harry Lindley's company performed the female roles. The military theatre performances were special occasions and attracted those who did not regularly attend the theatre. A notable performance came in 1869 when the 17th Regiment put on The Barrack Room with the lead actress being Sallie Holman.

In 1872, the theatre was renovated and opened under new management in August. Management of the theatre changed again in January 1873.

The theatre was destroyed on January 30, 1874 in a fire. Smoke was noted rising from the roof of the hall by Police Constable Cranston at about 7:30 pm that night. By the time firefighters arrived, the roof was fully engulfed in fire. Water failed to extinguish the fire and it spread to the interior. It was reported to be completely gutted by 1 am. The building represented no loss to the owner Mr. Robert French who had insured the building, but it threw the actors and crew out of work.

The Royal Lyceum's late 1860s and early 1870s success inspired the construction of other live theatres in Toronto. Two opened in 1874: the Queen's Theatre, with a capacity of 1,000, and the Grand Opera House which had a capacity of 1,300. The Queen's Theatre was destroyed by fire in April 1883. The Grand Opera suffered a fire in 1879, but was reconstructed. It was in use until the 1920s and was demolished in 1928.

Royal Opera House
- Interactive map of Royal Opera House
- Address: 99 1/2 King Street West, Toronto, Canada West
- Capacity: 1450

Construction
- Opened: September 1874
- Closed: March 1883 due to fire
- Cost: CA$64,500 (equivalent to $1,920,799 in 2025)
- Architect: Wallace Hume

=== Royal Opera House / Royal Theatre ===
On the location of the Royal Lyceum, James French constructed the Royal Theatre, or Royal Opera House, opening on September 21, 1874 with the play The Hunchback. It had a much larger capacity, better accommodations for the patrons, attention to acoustics, and a lighting control panel, removing the need for acoustic signals such as bells and whistles to stage hands to change lighting. The theatre had 600 seats in the gallery, 300 sofa seats in the balcony, 500 upholstered opera seats in the "parquet circle", and four private boxes. The opening was attended by Lieutenant Governor Crawford and Toronto Mayor W. F. Howland. The stage was 50 ft (15 m) by 57 ft (17 m), with a proscenium arch having a bust of Shakespeare and the quote "Nothing extenuate, nor set down, aught in malice".

The Holman Opera Company continued at the Royal. The success of H.M.S. Pinafore in England and the United States inspired the Holman company to put on their own production in February 1879. The Canadian premiere production featured three Holman family members: A.D. Holman as Sir Joseph Porter, Sallie Holman as Josephine, and Julia Holman as Hebe. The three-day run was a big success and an encore performance was held three days later. The Holmans then took their production to Philadelphia.

The theatre survived until it was destroyed by fire on February 8, 1883.The building was not fully insured by Mr. French, only insured for CA$12,000 but the loss was estimated at CA$60,000. According to Mr. French, the fire was started by an incendiary, or arsonist and he offered a reward of CA$1,000 for evidence leading to the arrest of the arsonist. Only two months later, the nearby Queen's Theatre was also destroyed by fire.

The Royal was not reconstructed, but some of its construction was retained in a warehouse built on the site. The warehouse was demolished in 1940 for a parking lot, and the parking lot replaced by the Toronto-Dominion Centre in the 1960s.

== Notable appearances and performances ==
Opera

- Elizabeth Greenfield (1852, 1855), selections
- Rosa de Vries-van Os (1853) - performed in Norma, advertised as the first full performance of an Italian grand opera in Canada West. It was conducted by Luigi Arditi.
- Caroline Richings (1855), selections
- Annie Milner (1858, 1859) - The Bohemian Girl, Lucia di Lammermoor, (1858) La Traviata (1859)
- Teresa Parodi (1859)
- Anna Bishop (1861), selections
- Pasquale Brignoli (1869) - in a series of performances of excerpts
- H.M.S. Pinafore (1879), billed as the first performance in Canada of Gilbert and Sullivan's comic opera.
- Alice Oates and Alice Oates' English Comic Opera Company (1880)
- Maurice Grau's Great French Opera Company (1880)
- Tagliapetra's Grand Italian Opera Company (1880)
- Leavitt's Grand English Opera Burlesque Company (1881)

Theatre

- Charles Walter Couldock (1854)
- Henry Farren (1855) in The Mysterious Stranger, or Satan in Paris!
- Susan Denin and Kate Denin (1855) in The Hunchback
- William Evans Burton (1859) in several comediesv
- Alice Placide (1863) in Madeline and The Lady and The Devil
- Paul Martinetti and his company (1873) in a Christmas pantomime "Pat-a-Cake"
- Denman Thompson (1879) in Joshua Whitcomb

Other acts

- Signor Donnetti's "Wonderful Company of Acting Monkeys and Dogs" (1857)
