= Denin =

Denin is a surname. Notable people with the surname include:

- Kate Denin (1837–1907), American stage actress
- Nikolay Denin (born 1958), Russian governor
- Susan Denin (1835–1875), American stage actress, sister of Kate

== See also ==
- Donin
