= Harriet Elizabeth Savill =

English actress

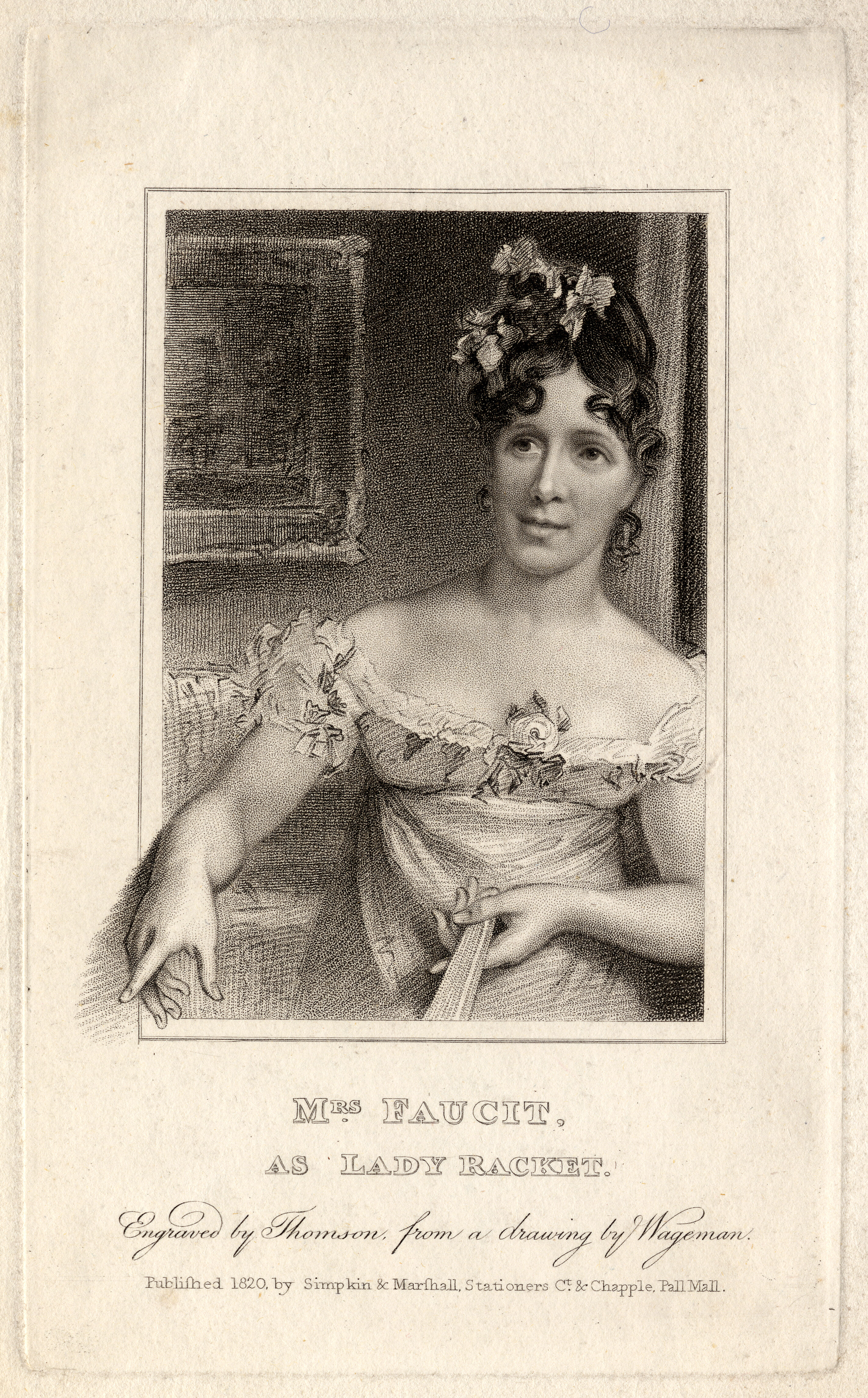
1820 print in the role of Lady Racket from Three Weeks After Marriage.

Harriet Elizabeth Savill née Diddear, later married name Farren, known as Mrs Faucit) (1789–1857) was an English actress.

Harriet Diddear was the child of a theatre manager John Diddear and his wife Anne. She first appeared on stage at the age of six at the Theatre Royal, Brighton, and performed in Dover, Richmond and Margate in her childhood. At the age of 15 she eloped with, and on 2 September 1805 married, John Faucit Savill; shortly afterwards they appeared on stage at Margate and then Dover and as "Mr & Mrs Faucit". They had six children, including Helena or Helen Faucit (1817-1898), a celebrated actress.

In 1813 she appeared as Desdemona at Covent Garden Theatre on 7 October, her London debut, and she played Cleopatra there on 15 November. For the next twenty years she performed at Covent Garden, the Haymarket Theatre and Drury Lane.

The Oxford Dictionary of National Biography summarises her acting career thus:

Mrs Faucit was very successful in certain comic parts (such as Celia in The Humourous Lieutenant [sic]) and as the heroine of melodramas and musical plays. Her serious acting, which seemed meretricious in characters such as Lady Macbeth, was genuinely affecting in Meg Merrilies and similar roles; her handsome face and Junoesque figure were assets in regal parts such as Elizabeth in Richard III, Gertrude in Hamlet, and the empress in The Exile.

In 1821 she sought an annulment of her marriage, unsuccessfully; she left her husband for William Farren (1786-1861), whom she married in 1853 after her first husband's death. He had two sons, actors Henry Farren (1826?-1860) and William (1825-1908); while the Oxford Dictionary of National Biography states that these were Harriet's sons, the records of the Garrick Club Collections describe them as the sons of "an unknown woman (his first wife?)".

She died in London on 16 June 1853.
