= Stollmann =

Stollmann is a surname, likely of German origin. Notable people with the surname include:

- Jörg Stollmann, German architect
- Jost Stollmann (born 1955), German-Australian businessman

== See also ==
- Stollman
