= Donin =

Donin is a surname. Notable people with this surname include:

- Hayim Halevy Donin (1928–1983), American rabbi and author
- Nicholas Donin, French religious figure

== See also ==
- Denin
