= William Farren =

English actor (1796–1861)

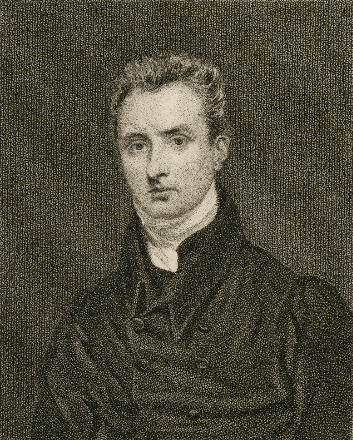
- Born: 13 May 1796
- Died: 24 September 1861 (aged 65)
- Occupation: Actor

William Farren (13 May 1786 – 24 September 1861) was an English actor, who was the son of the actor of the same name (born 1754), who played leading roles from 1784 to 1795 at Theatre Royal, Covent Garden.

== Life ==
Raised on Gower Street in London, he was raised in comparative affluence, supported not only by his father's wealth but also by a large gift from surgeon Percival Pott. He attended school in Soho and may have apprenticed as an attorney in Wolverhampton; by 1806, however, he had joined his brother Percy's troupe in Plymouth. His first appearance on the stage was at the Theatre Royal, Plymouth in Charles Macklin's Love à la mode. From the beginning he specialized in comic old men and Irish parts. A decade of provincial apprenticeship followed in southern England and in Dublin (where he married); his first roles included Adam Contest in Elizabeth Inchbald's The Wedding Day and Lovegold in Henry Fielding's translation of Molière's The Miser; however, his name is associated with a wide variety of roles.

His first London appearance was in 1818 at Covent Garden as Sir Peter Teazle (in Sheridan's The School for Scandal), a part with which his name was always associated: he was an instant popular and critical success. He succeeded also in Colman and Garrick's The Clandestine Marriage.

He played at Covent Garden every winter until 1828, and began in 1824 a series of summer engagements at the Haymarket which also lasted some years. At these two theatres he played an immense variety of comedic characters. After 1821, he separated from his first wife and began living with Harriet Elizabeth Savill, who was at the time married to John Saville Faucit. After an unsuccessful attempt to annul the marriage, Farren and Savill lived together under common law marriage, though they did not marry formally until Saville's death in 1853. Farren and his brother played important roles in training Savill's daughter, Helen Faucit, for her successful acting career.

From 1828 until 1837 he was at Drury Lane, where he essayed a wider range of characters, including Polonius and Caesar. He was again at Covent Garden for a few years, where he continued to expand his repertoire. Apart from an unsuccessful turn as Shylock, he attempted female roles such as Meg Merrilies in a dramatization of Scott's Guy Mannering.

In fall of 1837, he joined the troupe run by Lucia Elizabeth Vestris at the Olympic Theatre, and he stayed with Vestris during her management of Covent Garden, ending in 1842. His most notable new role during this period was as Sir Harcourt Courtly in Dion Boucicault's London Assurance.

He next joined Benjamin Webster at the Haymarket as stage-manager as well as actor. Now nearly sixty, he succeeded in two notable old-men roles by Mark Lemon: the title characters in Grandfather Whitehead and Old Parr. His performance as Thomas Parr was praised by The Times as a breakthrough in English acting. He was performing in that role in 1843 when he suffered an on-stage stroke. He was, however, able to reappear the following year, and he remained at the Haymarket ten years more, though his acting never again reached its former level; Edward Dutton Cook recalls an 1851 performance in which Farren, though "acting admirably", did not utter a single intelligible word.

For a time he managed the Strand, and between 1850 and 1853, was lessee of the Olympic. During his later years he confined himself to parts portraying old men, in which he was unrivalled. In 1855 he made his final appearance at the Haymarket, as Lord Ogleby in a scene from the Clandestine Marriage.

With Faucit, he left two sons, Henry (1826–1860) and William (1825–1908), both actors. The former was the father of Nellie Farren, long famous for boy's parts in Gaiety musical burlesques, in the days of Edward Terry and Fred Leslie. As Jack Sheppard, and in similar roles, she had a unique position at the Gaiety, and was an unrivalled public favourite. In 1892 her health failed, and her retirement, coupled with Fred Leslie's death, brought to an end the type of Gaiety burlesque associated with them.

== Art and reputation ==
In the types of characters he favored, "crusty old bachelors, jealous old husbands, stormy fathers, worrying uncles, or ancient fops with ghastly pretensions to amiability" (as Lewes described them), he was among the most highly regarded actors of his time. His performances were known for their polish and subtlety; in more sentimental roles, such as Old Parr, he was able to mix sentiment with cool irony. He was at home in Augustan and other eighteenth century roles, but he is not remembered as a Shakespearian actor. Macready remembered him as justly famous for "studious correctness", but described him as second to William Dowton and Joseph Munden in "the rich quality of humor." William Hazlitt praised the conservatism of his style in the older plays. Leigh Hunt disagreed, disparaging Farren in favor of Dowton as Anthony Absolute (Sheridan's The Rivals). Even Hunt, though, acknowledged Farren's exceptional self-possession. Writing in The Times in 1855, Henry Morley called Farren "one of the most finished actors by whom the stage has been adorned in the present century." Writing after the actor's death, John Westland Marston recalls that the actor excelled in portraying "the vanity, the self-love, the inconsistency, and now and then the redeeming good-feeling of worldly, well-bred people, and occasionally the credulous faith of simple, guileless people."

== Bibliography ==
- Adams, W. D. (1904). A Dictionary of the Drama. London: Chatto and Windus.
- Carlisle, Carol (2004). "William Farren." Oxford Dictionary of National Biography. 2004.
- Cook, Dutton (1880). "Old Farren." The Gentleman's Magazine. CCXLVI.
- Hazlitt, William (1903). Collected Works. A. R. Waller and Arnold Glover, editors. London: J.M. Dent.
- Hunt, Leigh (1949). Leigh Hunt's Dramatic Criticism, 1808-1831. Lawrence Huston Houtchens and Carolyn Washburn Houtchens, editors. New York: Columbia University Press.
- Macready, William (1875). Macready's Reminiscences and Selections from His Diaries and Letters. Frederick Pollock, editor. London: Macmillan.
- Marston, Westland (1888). Our Recent Actors. London: Sampson, Low.
- Sandars, Harry (1879). "Deaths on or Associated with the Stage." Notes and Queries. 5th series, 11.
