= Phillip Stollman =

- Born: c. 1906; Soviet Union
- Died: May 4, 1998 (age 92); Commerce Township, Michigan
- Occupation: Real estate developer
- Children: 4
- Family: Isaac Stollman (brother)

Phillip Stollman (c. 1906 – May 4, 1998) was a Soviet-born American real estate developer, Zionist, and philanthropist who co-founded the Biltmore Development Company.

== Biography ==
Stollman was born to an Orthodox Jewish family in the Soviet Union, one of six sons of Louis Stollman. His family immigrated to the USA in the 1920s, settling in Detroit, where his father established a construction company called Stollman Building which was successful until the Great Depression. In 1941, Philip and his brother Max started their own construction company in Detroit called Biltmore Building Company.

== Philanthropy ==
Stollman and his brother Max were significant philanthropists in greater Detroit and Israel. Partnering with academic Pinkhos Churgin, the Stollmans were founding patrons of Bar Ilan University, Israel's second university, where Philip served as its Chairman of the Global Board. He was the founder of the Akiva Day School and an early supporter of Hillel Day School in Farmington Hills, Michigan. In 1958, they built Congregation Mishkan Israel, in Oak Park, Michigan, where their oldest brother, Isaac Stollman, as rabbi. In 1964, Mishkan Israel became a Lubavitch Center funded by Phillip who was a close friend of Rabbi Berel Shemtov, the regional director of the Lubavitch movement. They later funded and built Congregation Young Israel in Oak Park affiliated with National Council of Young Israel. In 1948, when the State of Israel was created, Phillip became national vice president of Israel Bonds encouraging the Jewish community to invest in Israel. Stollman served on the Executive Board of the Detroit Federation, the Chairman of the Allied Jewish Campaign, and as board member of Sinai Hospital. In 1966, he and his brother were named as "Men of the Year" by the Religious Zionists of America. He helped to found the Albert Einstein College of Medicine then part of Yeshiva University. In 1980, he and his wife were awarded the Fred M. Butzel Memorial Award.

== Personal life ==
Stollman had four children, Dr. Gerald Stollman, Shirley Stollman, Annette Stollman Ran, and Rochelle Stollman. He died at the age of 92 at Huron Valley Hospital in Commerce Township, Michigan and is buried at Har HaMenuchot in Jerusalem.
