= Helena Faucit =

English actress (1817–1898)

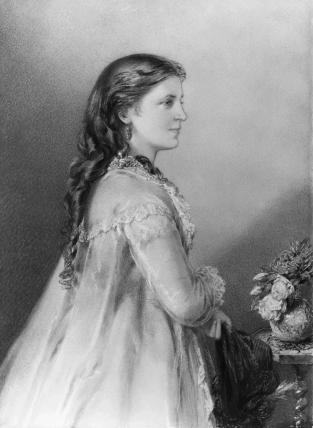
Helena Faucit

Helena Saville Faucit, Lady Martin (Note: Sometimes spelled Helen Fawcett.) (11 October 1817 – 31 October 1898) was an English actress.

== Early life ==
Born in London in 1817, she was the daughter of actors John Saville Faucit and Harriet Elizabeth Savill. Her parents separated when she was a girl, and her mother went to live with William Farren in 1825. With her elder sister Harriet, she was trained for the stage by her step-uncle, Percy Farren. She debuted as Juliet at a small theatre in Richmond in 1833. Her performance was praised by critics of The Athenaeum, but Farren delayed her professional debut to give her further training.

== Early career ==
Faucit's first professional appearance was made on 5 January 1836 at Covent Garden as Julia in James Sheridan Knowles's The Hunchback. Her debut, a spectacular success, placed her at once among the leading actresses in London, helping to fill the void left by the retirement of Fanny Kemble in 1834. Her success in The Hunchback was followed by turns as Belvidera in Thomas Otway's Venice Preserv'd, and as Margaret in Joanna Baillie's The Separation. Though her interpretation of Belvidera was received coldly by critics, she remained a favourite of playgoers; already in that first season, she was signed to a three-year contract at Covent Garden.

== Career with Macready ==
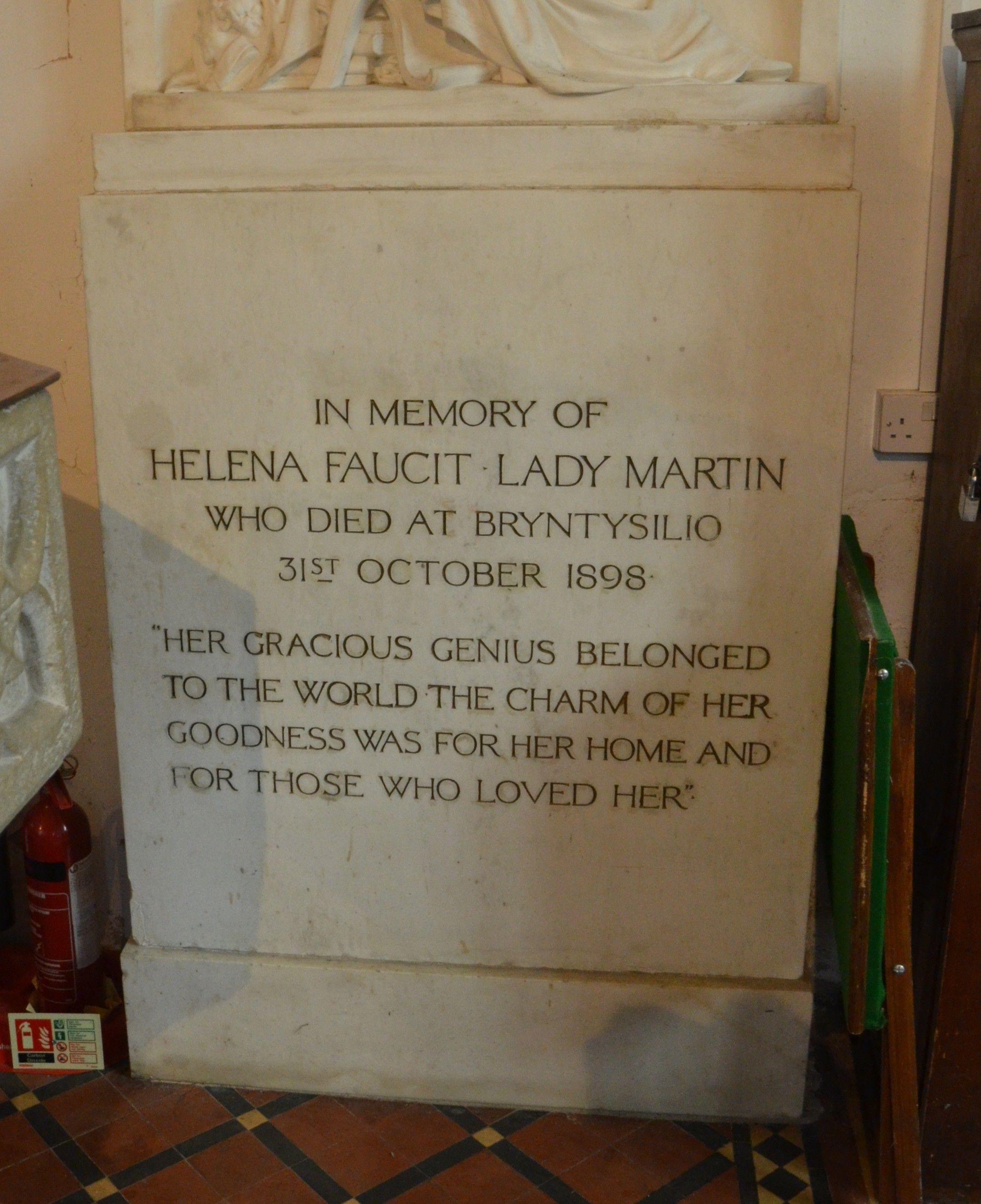
Memorial to Helena Faucit in St Tysilio's Church, Llantysilio, Denbighshire

William Charles Macready joined the Covent Garden company in the middle of 1836. In the following year, Faucit played numerous Shakespearean roles, among them Juliet, Imogen (Cymbeline), Hermione (The Winter's Tale), Beatrice (Much Ado About Nothing), and Cordelia (King Lear), alongside both Macready and the soon-to-retire Charles Kemble. Her non-Shakespearean roles during the three years at Covent Garden included the female leads in Lytton's Duchess de la Vallière, Lady of Lyons, Richelieu, The Sea Captain, and Money, in Robert Browning's Strafford, and in Knowles's Woman's Wit.

Faucit followed Macready to the Haymarket Theatre in 1840; in December of that year, however, she suffered an attack of a recurrent lung ailment. While she recuperated at the coast, rumours circulated that she was pregnant with Macready's child; her physicians published diagnoses that scotched these rumours. She returned to the Haymarket by May 1841 playing the character Clara Douglas in Bulwer-Lytton's play Money and later performing in Zouch Troughton's Nina Sforza.

After a visit to Paris and a short season at the Haymarket, she joined the Drury Lane company under Macready early in 1842. There she played Lady Macbeth, Constance in King John, Desdemona, and Imogen, and took part in the first production of John Westland Marston's The Patrician's Daughter (1842) and Browning's Blot on the Scutcheon (1843).

Her Lady Macbeth of the 1843 season was, however, a failure; Macready found her conception deficient in "heart", and she was physically unable to achieve the commanding presence of Sarah Siddons, as Macready wished. She was, moreover passed over for Rosalind in favour of Louisa Cranstoun Nisbett; this role would later become one of her best-known Shakespearean roles. Nevertheless, Macready considered her "beyond all compare" the best English actress of the period.

== After Macready ==
When Macready left for America in 1843, Faucit emerged as an even greater celebrity. In the mid-1840s she toured in Scotland and Ireland. Her most celebrated roles included Pauline in Lady of Lyons at the Theatre Royal, Edinburgh, Antigone at Dublin, and various Shakespearean roles, including a revamped and now-successful Lady Macbeth. Acting with Macready in Paris in 1845, she received so much applause that Macready was jealous, and the two did not act together again.

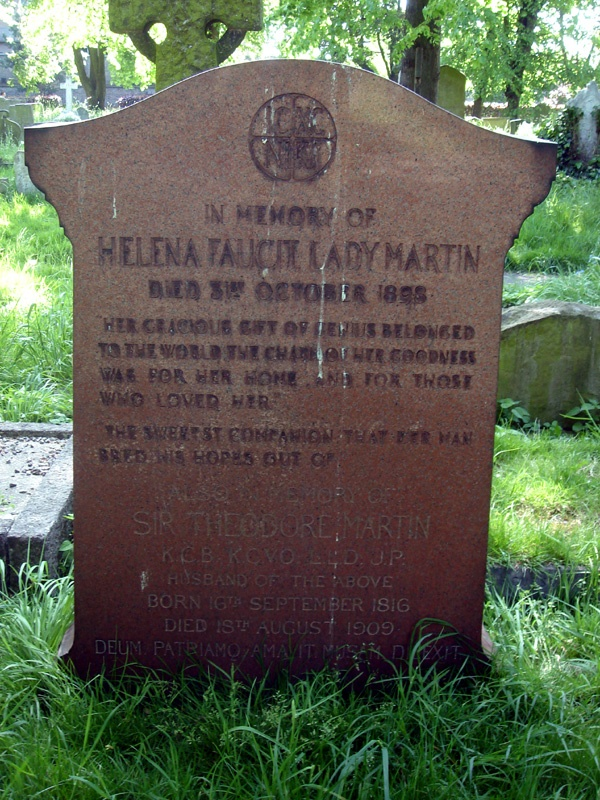
Funerary monument, Brompton Cemetery, London

Faucit occasionally returned to London, but her main activity for the remainder of her career was touring, especially in Manchester and in Sheffield, where her brother owned a theatre. In 1846 she returned to Dublin to perform in Euripides' Iphigenia at Aulis, which proved as popular as her Antigone had been the previous year. In October 1846 she took the part of Juliet to the Romeo of Gustavus Brooke at Dublin. In 1850, she acted in the title role of Iolanthe in Theodore Martin's adaptation of King René's Daughter. The last time she assayed the role was in 1876 at the Lyceum Theatre, London, with Henry Irving's company opposite Irving as Count Tristan.

== Career after marriage ==
In 1851 she married Theodore Martin, who was later knighted, making her Lady Martin. She continued to act occasionally for charity. One of her last appearances was as Beatrice, on the opening of the Shakespeare Memorial at Stratford-on-Avon on 23 April 1879. In 1881 there appeared in Blackwood's Magazine the first of her Letters on some of Shakespeares Heroines, which were published in book form as On Some of Shakespeare's Female Characters (1885).

Lady Martin died at her home at Bryntysilio Hall near Llangollen in 1898, aged 81. There is a tablet dedicated to her in Llantysilio church. There is also a tablet to her in the Shakespeare Memorial with a portrait figure, and the marble pulpit in the Shakespeare church with her portrait as Saint Helena was given in her memory by her husband. She is buried in Brompton Cemetery, London.
