= George Farren =

English cricketer

George Farren (25 June 1874 – 2 November 1956) was an English cricketer. He was a right-handed batsman who played for Warwickshire. He was born in Rugby and died in Coventry.

Farren made a single first-class appearance for the team, against Yorkshire in 1912. Batting in the middle order, Farren scored a duck in the only innings in which he batted, becoming one of four victims of George Hirst. With the first two days' play rained off, the match headed to an inevitable draw, in spite of each team's low scores.
