= Jost Stollmann =

Jost Stollmann is a German-Australian business man and the previous CEO of Tyro Payments.

Born in 1955, Jost Stollmann founded German IT company CompuNet Computer Vertriebs-GmbH in 1984 which he sold to General Electric in 1996 by when it had grown to 3,000 employees.

== Life ==
In 1998, Jost was the shadow minister for economy in the German opposition for the Social Democratic Party.

From 2003 to 2005, Jost undertook a world-circumnavigation together with his wife and five children.

From 2004 to 2016, Jost was the CEO of Tyro Payments.

In July 2017, Jost retired as an executive director and became a non-executive director.
