= Isaac Stollman =

- Born: 1894; Russia
- Died: 1980 (age 86)
- Occupation: Rabbi
- Family: Phillip Stollman (brother); Aryeh Lev Stollman (grandson)

Isaac Stollman (Hebrew: יצחק סטולמן) (1980 - 1894) was a noted rabbi, author and religious Zionist leader.

== Biography ==
He was born in Russia in 1897. He studied at some of the most prominent Yeshivos including the Yeshiva of the Chofetz Chaim in Radin, the Slobodka yeshiva, and the Novardok yeshiva. He received rabbinical ordination from Shimon Shkop, Moshe Mordechai Epstein and others. In 1924, he immigrated to the United States where he served as rabbi in Detroit, Michigan. In 1925, he became rabbi of the Mishkan Israel synagogue which was built by his two younger brothers, real estate developers, Max and Phillip Stollman. In Detroit he was active in many areas of Jewish life. He served as leader of Young Israel, the Stoliner Synagogue, the Beth Yehudah school, the Jewish Community Council, and was also on the board of the Jewish Federation. In 1957, having served as vice-president of Mizrachi-Hapoel Hamizrachi of America for years, he was elected president of that organization, re-elected in 1959, and remained in that position till 1960. He was the president of the Detroit Rabbinical Council and the author of the acclaimed Minchas Yitzchak on the Pentateuch. Upon Stollman's death in 1980, Emanuel Rackman representing Bar-Ilan University referred to Rabbi Stollman as a "distinguished Rabbi and scholar and outstanding Religious Zionist leader". Rabbi Norman Lamm representing Yeshiva University referred to Stollman as "an outstanding scholar and Zionist."

== Works and articles ==
- מנחת יצחק (Minchas Yitzchak), 4 volumes. 1948
- ציון מן התורה. Zevi Tabory, editor. Isaac Stollman, contributor. Torah Education and Culture Department of the Jewish Agency, Jerusalem, 1963.
- Or HaMizrach, No. 4, Vol 1: (הליכות עולם (לבעיות השעה
- Unpublished works (still in manuscript)
- Religious Freedom in Israel. New York Times, May 10, 1958.

== Biographies ==
- Rand, Asher (editor). Toldot Anshe Shem. New York, 1950.
- Kovetz Bais Aharon veYisroel, No. 47, 1993.
- he:יצחק סטולמן (Hebrew Wikipedia article on Isaac Stollman)
