= Farber Hebrew Day School – Yeshivat Akiva =

Religious school in Michigan, United States

Coordinates: 42°30′08.4″N 83°15′10.3″W

Information
- Former names: Akiva Hebrew Day School (1964-1982); Yeshivat Akiva-Akiva Hebrew Day School-Stollman Education Center (1982-?)
- Motto: A foundation in Torah, a lifetime of success
- Established: 1964; 62 years ago
- Former mottos: The best of two worlds; The best of both worlds
- Website: https://farberhds.org/

Yeshivat Akiva is an N-12 Modern Orthodox Religious Zionist day school in Southfield, Michigan, serving Southeast Michigan. It opened in 1964 as an elementary school and added a middle school in 1967 and high school starting in 1971 with a 10th grade. The school has had a strong connection to Israel, and for the first two decades the school's 12th grade took place in Israel.

The school's original name was Akiva Hebrew Day School. In 1982, the school was renamed Yeshivat Akiva-Akiva Hebrew Day School-Stollman Education Center. It is currently known as Farber Hebrew Day School-Yeshivat Akiva and uses the motto "A foundation in Torah, a lifetime of success." The latest name change came as part of a major endowment by the Audrey & William Farber Family.

== Founders and endowments ==
The school grew out of a March 1964 meeting, called by Rabbi James Gordon and Rabbi Hayim Halevy Donin, with 13 parents at the home of Mr. and Mrs. David Dombey. The original trustees of the school were David I. Berris, Mrs. David Dombey, Rabbi Hayim Donin, Dr. Jacob Goldman, Rabbi James I. Gordon, Rabbi Israel I. Halpern, Dr. Max Kapustin, Ithamar Koenigsberg, Dr. Charles Levi, Seymour Ribat, Elliot Steiman and Phillip Stollman.

The first Annual Akiva Dinner was held on Jan 18, 1966, at the Bnai David Synagogue. At the tenth annual dinner in 1974, Abba Eban was the guest of honor and presented the school with the 1974 Spiritual Bridges Award of the WZO's department for Torah Education and Culture. At the same dinner, Rabbi James I. Gordon was honored for his work with the school. In 1984, Avital Sharansky spoke at the annual dinner.

In December 1974, Phillip, Max and Frieda Stollman dedicated a kindergarten building in the school. The kindergarten was a prefab building on the property of Young Israel of Southfield.

In November 1986, Mrs. Hannah Karbal dedicated the Elementary school, which then became known as the Karbal Elementary School.

In January 1988, The Sara Tugman Learning Resource Center for students with special educational needs was dedicated.

In 2001, the Schostak Family set up the Millennium Fund to boost the high school program at Akiva. The campus was subsequently known as the Schostak Family Campus.

In 2013, as the school approached its 50th anniversary, the school received two major donations. The William Davidson Foundation donated $2.25 million, for "augmentation and improvement of Akiva's academic offerings." This was followed by the William and Audrey Farber Philanthropic Endowment Fund, which came forward with a 3 million dollar donation, which instigated a funding campaign and the construction of Akiva's first ever new facility. The Farber donation was later increased to $8 million and a new building was planned. Groundbreaking was in November, 2015.

== Principals ==
Name	Years
Rabbi Manfred Pick	1964-1970
Rabbi Gerald Werner	1970-1972
Rabbi Joseph Schuchatowitz	1972-1976
Rabbi Zev Schostak	1976-1979
Rabbi Henoch Millen	1979-1984
Rabbi Sheldon Lopin	1984-1988
Rabbi Zev Shimansky	1988-1995
Rabbi Karmi Gross	1995-2000
Rabbi Yigal Tsaidi	2000-2009
Chaye Kohl	2009-2011
Rabbi Tzvi Klugerman	2011-2016
Rabbi Scot Berman	2016-2020
Dr. Joshua Levisohn	2020-2024
Dr. Seth Korelitz	2024-

== Teacher ==
Rabbi Eliezer Cohen taught at Akiva from 1974 until the time of his death in 2014. He influenced several generations of Akiva students, teaching them Mishna, Talmud, and Bible. He was known for teaching the 6th grade class as well as the highest track of high school students. His yahrzeit continues to be marked by former students with days of learning.

== Student leadership ==
Elisha Prero was the first Student Council president, elected in 1968. He was succeeded by Mike Feigelman in 1969, followed by Gary Torgow in 1970 and Sheldon Klein for the 1970–71 school year. Sharon Rose was elected president for 1971–1972, becoming the first woman to serve that role.

== Extracurricular activities ==
=== Chidon HaTanach ===
Akiva has participated in Bible Competitions, including the International Chidon HaTanach. In 1972, Benny Micznik and Joel Bigman advanced to the National competition in New York. Ira Finkelstein represented the school in the National Bible Contest in 1980. In 2008, Dovi Nadel came in 3rd internationally. In that same year, Elizabeth Goldmeier was also an international finalist.

=== Science fairs ===
In 1974, Grant Mitchell won second prize in the Southwest Michigan Regional Science fair, and first prize in the Metropolitan Detroit Science Fair junior division.

=== Mishmar ===
A mishmar program was initiated in 1972 for Thursday evenings. At first the program was voluntary, but in later years it became compulsory.

=== Drama ===
The students of the school have frequently put on plays for the public. In March 1973, they produced The Diary of Anne Frank. In 1975 students performed "Tevye and His Daughters." In 1980, Akiva students put on "The Importance of Being Earnest."

=== National Merit Scholars ===
In 1982, student Shani Schreiber became a National Merit Scholar.

=== Invent America! ===
For many years, students in the school participated in the Invent America! competition. In 1987, kindergarten student Zevi Steinmetz won the national competition when he invented a Popsicle stick that caught drips.

=== Math Olympiad ===
Starting in 1988, Akiva participated in the International Math Olympiad. Amy Zwas was the School champion in the first year.

=== Battle of the Books ===
For many years Akiva has participated in the Southfield Public Library's Battle of the Books, winning on a number of occasions. The first overall victory took place in 1989, when Akiva swept 1st, 2nd and 3rd place. In 2012 a team from Akiva again won the competition. In 2013, an Akiva team won both divisions. An Akiva team placed every year from 2014 to 2018, winning first in 2014, 2015, 2017, and 2018.

=== Israel Quiz Bowl ===
Starting in 1989, Akiva participated in the Israel Quiz Bowl, competing in the Day School division. The competition ran through 1993, with Akiva winning in the final year of competition.

=== YUNMUN ===
In 1993, Akiva sent its first delegation to Yeshiva University's National Model United Nations (YUNMUN), and has been sending students to the conference ever since. In 1997, several students were awarded Best Delegate awards.

=== Panim El Panim ===
In 1997 students from Akiva began attending Panim El Panim, a four-day learning program in Washington DC.

== Athletics ==
Akiva has had many sports teams over the years, though some were quite short-lived. The basketball team was known as the Pioneers, named after the school yearbook, HeChalutz. With the name change that occurred in 2016, the sports team took on the moniker Farber Fire. The early floor hockey team was known as the Cougars.

=== Floor Hockey ===
Akiva's first reported athletic competition was a 1972 floor hockey contest against Yeshiva Beth Yehuda, played at the Detroit Jewish Center. Akiva won 9-5 before a crowd of 150. The floor hockey team also played against Hillel Day School and Windsor.

=== Baseball ===
In 1973, sixth grade boys in both Akiva and Yeshivat Beth Yehuda formed a Shabbat observant baseball league and played against one another.

=== Basketball ===
In 1985 Akiva organized a basketball team, which played against Beth Yehudah, Skokie, and the local JCC. Moshe Rose was the coach. The team captain in 1986 was Donny Ebenstein. in 1987, the school was invited to its first tournament, sponsored by HAFTR. Michael Selesny served as captain that year. That year also saw Akiva host an Israeli high school all-star team. Danny Najman was captain in the 1989–1990 season. Etan Berman and Zach Herman were co-captains in 1995. Ken Kohn became coach of the team in 1994 and served for over two decades in that role. He was replaced in 2011 by Rick Kaczander. The team frequently attends tournaments in New York, including at Yeshiva of Flatbush and Yeshiva University, and has also gone to Toronto, Columbus, and other locations over the years. In 1998 the team won the Tier III championship at the Y.U. tournament, captained by Erie Skoczylas. In 2013, the middle school team played against Hillel at the Palace of Auburn Hills during halftime of an exhibition game.

In 1989, the school hosted its first basketball tournament, the Akiva Invitational, consisting of four JV teams. Akiva's team was considered a JV squad as all seniors were learning in Israel. This tournament ran for two years, though the tournament trophy resided for many years in the office of the headmaster. In 2011, Akiva again hosted a basketball tournament, dubbed the First Annual Detroit Yeshiva Basketball Invitational Tournament. Teams from Cleveland, Pittsburgh and Columbus participated. The inaugural tournament was won by the team from Fuchs Mizrachi.

=== Tennis ===
A tennis team was started in 2009, coached by Bryan Weinstein. Practice takes place at Southfield-Lathrup High School and at the Detroit Tennis and Squash Club.

== Israel program ==
From the inception of the high school, students were expected to spend time studying in Israel. At first this was done for most of 12th grade, after having completed an accelerated curriculum over the previous three years. In August 1973, the school's first 12th grade, consisting of Jonathan Freier, Sheldon Klein, Gary Torgow, Danny Schnipper, Jonathan Simon, Barbara Eskin, Michael Greenbaum, Benny Micznik, David Donin, Karen Polk, Judith Mermelstein, Lynn Dombey, Sarina Flatt and Solomon Pesis, left for Israel. The program was arranged in conjunction with the Jewish Agency. The girls were originally enrolled in an Ulpana in Kiryat Motzkin, but ended up on Kibbutz Tirat Zvi, while the boys were in Tikvat Yaakov on moshav Sde Yaakov. The first class was present during the Yom Kippur War.

Among this first class, who had spent 12th grade in Israel, several elected to return to Israel for another year of study, going to Machon Gold, Keren B'Yavne, Hebrew University, the army-kibbutz Nahal program.

Subsequent classes spent their 12th grade in Israel as well. The Class of 1976 marked the first cohort that learned in Akiva from 1st through 12th grade. The Class of 1977 had the largest number of graduates, at 22, and five elected to attend Bar Ilan University after graduation.

In 1990, the 12th grade Israel program was cancelled. This led to the entire class of 1991 leaving the school a year early, along with most members of the Class of 1993. Remaining members of the Class of 1993 were skipped a grade and graduated along with the Class of 1992. Again in 1994, only one student was enrolled for senior year. By the 1994-1995 year, however, the transition was complete a regular 12th grade has existed in the school since. Students were widely opposed to the cancellation of the program. Reasons given for the decision were that it became widely accepted among day schools for students to spend a year in Israel post-graduation, and that the Akiva students no longer attended the same schools in Israel, so it no longer felt like an extension of the class. The principal at the time, Zev Shimansky, also felt that students were suffering from the condensed academic program during three years of high school.

Many graduates of Akiva choose to spend a year or more after graduation studying in Israel. The school also has a high aliya rate.

== Locations ==
The original home of Yeshivat Akiva was in the Labor Zionist Building at 19161 Schaefer. The school moved from there to Young Israel of Oak-Woods, and then to the United Hebrew School "Rohlik" building at 21550 12 Mile Rd in 1971.

In 1980, having grown to 260 students, the school began negotiations to lease either the Annie Lathrup Elementary School building on Southfield Rd, or Southfield No. 10 on Berg Road. The school ended up moving to the former, and remained there until 1999. Reticence to lease the building to Akiva led to charges in the Detroit Free Press of anti-Semitism, but the Lathrup City Council approved the transaction unanimously. In 1984, Akiva purchased the building for $350,000. In 1990, the student council raised money to repair the school's old flagpole, which had been vandalized in 1985. In May 1990, the school was closed for two days due to vandals breaking in and damaging the school. In the mid-90s, Akiva began to once again outgrow its building and began looking for a new space. One option was to move back to the UHS building. At the same time, the school ran into difficulties selling its existing property to developers, due to the building's historic status and a failure of the property to be rezoned. In 1998, with the merger of Adat Shalom and Beth Achim, Akiva was able to move into the old Beth Achim building on 12 Mile Road, which took place for the start of the 1999–2000 school year. To celebrate the move, a parade was held down 12 Mile Road with the school's Torah scrolls. The school remains on that campus, though a new building was constructed in 2016.

== Day camp ==
Starting in 1972, Akiva offered a summer day camp for ages 4–13. The camp was originally held at Congregation Bnai Torah. In the 1990s the camp was known as Camp Ruach. In the early 2000s it was called Camp Akiva, and in 2010 it joined with the JCC's Camp Discovery.

== Dress code ==
In 1992, a uniform was instituted in Akiva, to strengthen an existing dress code. The uniform was approved by the board of directors on November 5, 1991, and polling showed an 80% approval rate among parents, though it was widely opposed by the students. The dress code had called for girls to wear blouses with sleeves and skirts below their knees, while boys were to wear pants, collared shirts, kipot and tzitzit. The uniform was eventually relaxed in the mid-1990s, and returned to being a dress code of a similar nature.

By 2011, the school had a uniform for the elementary school and a dress code for the upper school. This was done to allow students the ability to develop their own sense of style and to teach them to balance style with halachic demands.

== Finances ==
The school has used a number of fundraising techniques over the years, including bingo games, flower sales, rummage sales, Chinese auctions and an annual dinner. In 1982 the school filed for reorganization under Chapter XI, but was able to recover and continue operating, opening with 330 students in 1982. By March, 1983, the school had exited Chapter XI after a successful reorganization. Rabbi Moshe Tendler spoke at the dinner that year.

In September 1983, the teachers of Akiva declared a strike. Twenty-two of the twenty-six teachers picketed the school, while the remaining four teachers continued to work, aided by replacements. Issues at stake were seniority policy, job security and workload. Picketing teachers were accused of violence, and in return sued the school for libel. Picketing continued for nine weeks. By November 18, six teachers had returned and fifteen remains on strike. By the middle of December, those teachers who remained on strike were fired.

In 2008, Akiva students realized that some classmates were leaving the school due to tuition costs and organized a fundraising drive to create tuition scholarships. This campaign was dubbed Lead the Way, and supports tuition-based scholarships for Akiva students. It continues to run on a yearly basis.

== See also ==
- History of the Jews in Metro Detroit
