= Susan Denin =

American actress

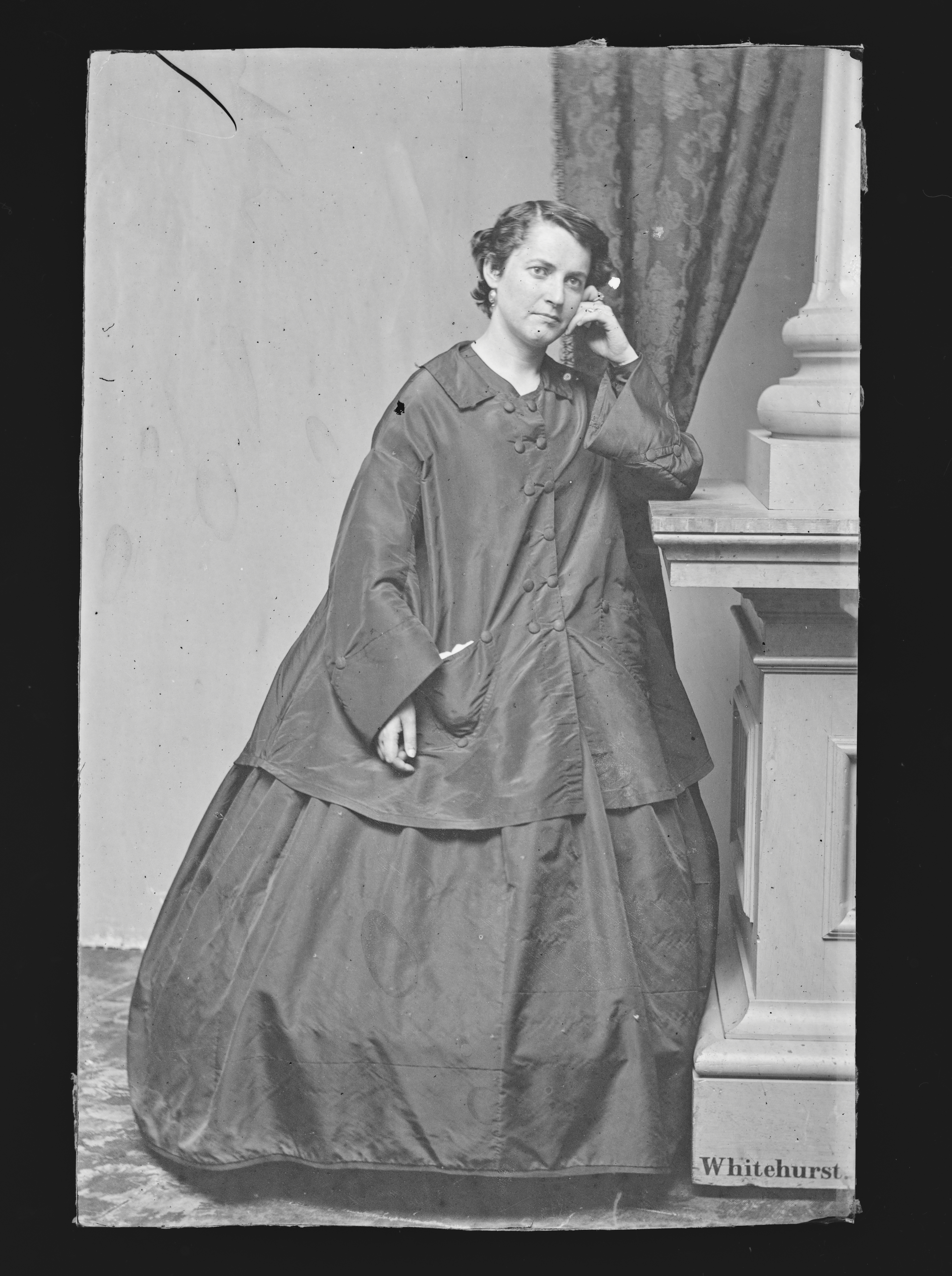
- 1860s
- Born: March 22, 1835; Philadelphia, Pennsylvania, U.S.
- Died: December 4, 1875 (aged 40); Bluffton, Indiana, U.S.
- Occupation: Actor
- Relatives: Kate (sister)

Susan Denin (March 22, 1835 – December 4, 1875) was an American actress.

== Biography ==
Her father died when she was a child, and her mother married an actor, John Winans. When very young, she and her sister Kate took the part of dancing fairies at the National Theatre, Philadelphia. Susan afterward became a favorite in New York City, other parts of the country and Canada, including an 1855 engagement at the Royal Lyceum in Toronto, with her sister Kate. In 1869, she made her first appearance in London, England. She married four times. Her death was the result of a fall on the stage in Indianapolis, Indiana.
