= Hayim Halevy Donin =

American rabbi and author

- Title: Rabbi

Personal life
- Born: Herman Dolnansky; June 3, 1928 New York City
- Died: January 21, 1982 (aged 53) Israel
- Spouse: Tzivia Donin

Religious life
- Religion: Judaism

Hayim Halevy Donin (1928–1982), was an American Orthodox rabbi and the author of several books on Jewish living. Donin was born Herman Dolnansky in the city of New York and changed his legal name in 1955.

== Academic formation ==
Donin obtained his degree in arts at the Yeshiva University in 1948, received his rabbinical ordination (semicha) at the Yeshiva University in 1951, ended his master's degree in arts at the Columbia University in 1952, and completed his doctorate in philosophy at the Wayne State University in 1966.

== History ==
Donin served as the rabbi of the Kesher Israel congregation, located in West Chester, Pennsylvania, between 1951 and 1953. He was an advisor to the B'nai B'rith lodge, and was also a member of the Hillel International foundation, located at the West Chester State Teachers College. In 1953, he was the rabbi of the B'nai David congregation, located in Southfield, Michigan, where he remained a rabbi until he made aliyah to Israel in 1973.

Donin was an associate professor of Jewish studies at the University of Detroit (1969–73), was the co-founder, and the first president of Yeshivat Akiva (1964), the first modern and Orthodox Hebrew day school located on the metropolitan area of Detroit. (Donin had previously founded a Hebrew academy in Oak Park, Illinois, before founding Yeshivat Akiva). Donin also served as vice president of the council of the Jewish community in Detroit, was the chairman of the licensing board for Hebrew teachers in the metropolitan area of Detroit, and was a member of the ethic and moral committee of the government of Michigan (1966–68). Donin participated in the 1961 White House Conference on Aging, as the president of the social action committee of the Rabbinical Council of America, in whose national board of directors he subsequently served (between the years 1967 and 1968).

== Literary works ==
After publishing the book Beyond Yourself (1965), Donin wrote a highly acclaimed series of books on the practice of rabbinical Judaism from an Orthodox perspective:

- To Be a Jew: A Guide to Jewish Observance in Contemporary Life (1972),
- To Raise a Jewish Child: A Guide for Parents (1977), and
- To Pray as a Jew: Guide to the Prayer Book and the Synagogue Service (1980).

After the success of To Be a Jew, a work that was translated into seven languages, Donin moved to Jerusalem to write full-time, and gave several lectures at the Bar-Ilan University in Ramat Gan from 1974–76.

== Legacy ==
Donin was one of the most popular teachers in the courses of conversion to Judaism for olim, which were jointly sponsored by the Rabbinical Council of America and by the Chief Rabbinate of Israel. In 1999, Donin received the Torah Umadah award from the Yeshiva University. Donin was honored posthumously by the Yeshiva University with the Dr. Samuel Belkin Award for excellence in the field of religious education.

== See also ==
- Samuel Belkin
