= St Tysilio's Church, Llantysilio =

Church in Denbighshire, Wales

Coordinates: 52.9832°N 3.2018°W

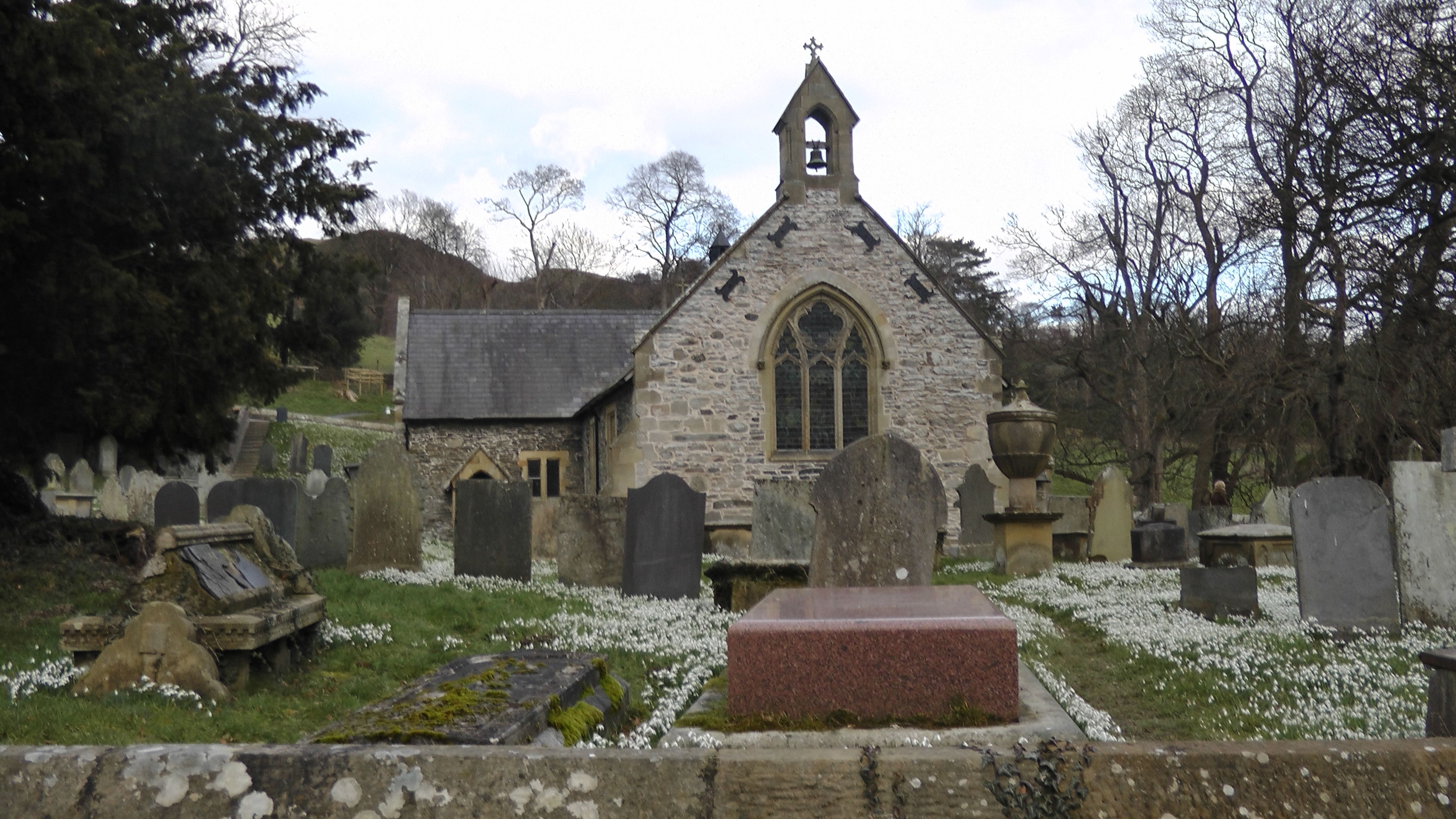
Llantysilio Church, 2015. In foreground is the grave of Charles Beyer, who died in 1876.

Llantysilio Church is a parish church in Llantysilio, near Llangollen, Denbighshire, Wales.

It sits on uprising land from the banks of the river Dee close to the local beauty spot of the Horseshoe Falls and source of water for the Llangollen canal. The canal is a World Heritage Site and it starts here and continues eleven miles to Chirk (and includes the famous Pontcysyllte Aqueduct).

It is dedicated to St Tysilio who lived in the 7th century.

It was built in the 15th century and then restored and modified by the German-born Charles Beyer, one of the prominent engineers of the Victorian era, and noted philanthropist, who died in 1876 whilst at residence at nearby Llantysilio Hall, only months after moving into his new mansion house, which he had just built and fitted out. He was buried in the church yard in the grounds of his 700-acre Llantysilio Hall estate. His gravestone of Aberdeen granite weighs over 2 tonnes. His will augmented the salary of the, then vicar of Llantysilio, H Humphrey for the rest of his life. He also left his Llantysilio Hall estate to his godson Sir Henry Beyer Robertson, who became owner of Brymbo Steelworks and a director of the Great Western Railway.

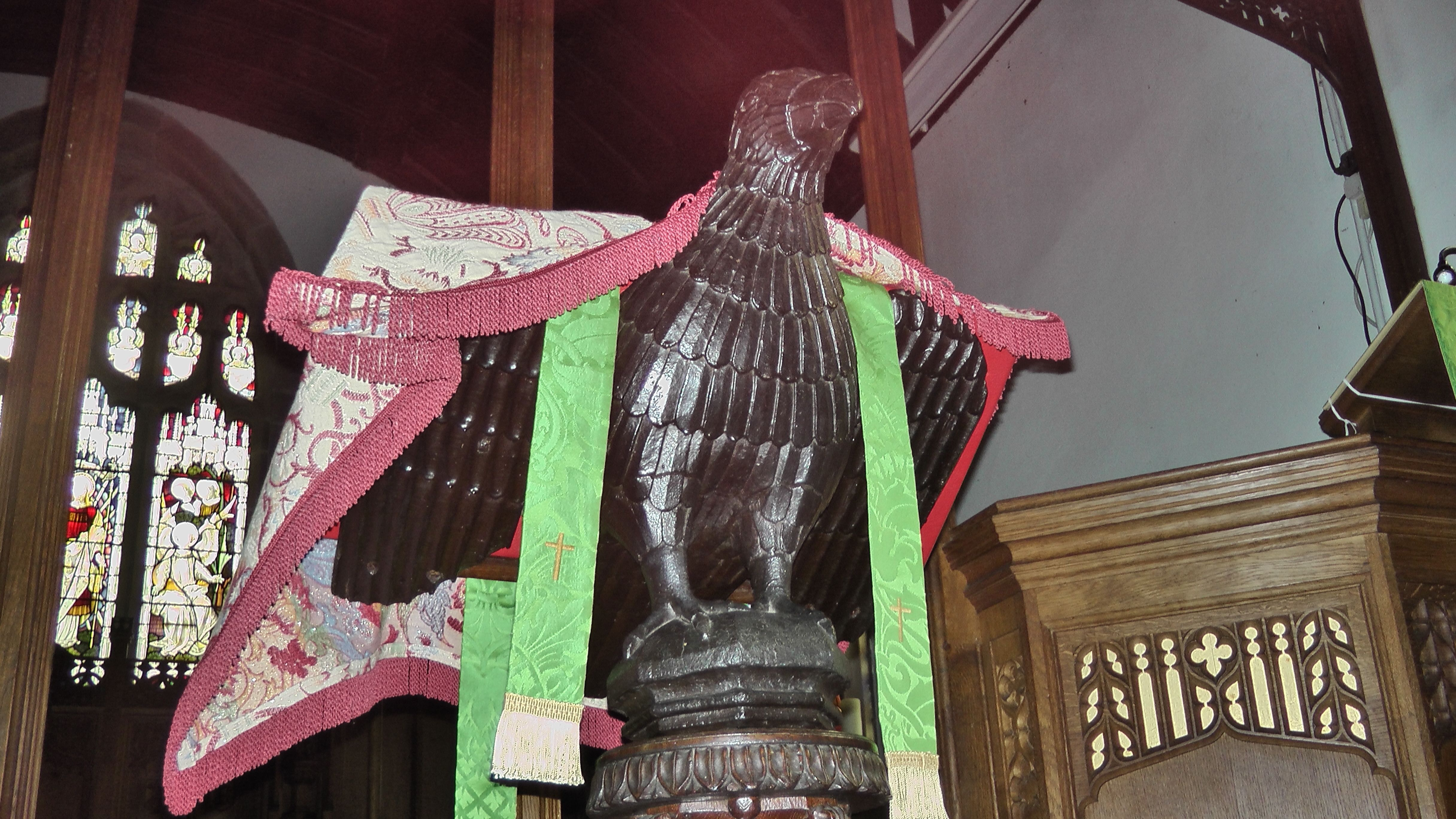
Medieval wood carved lectern of bird, Llantysilio Church, 2015

The church features a medieval carved wooden lectern of a black crow or (raven).

The graveyard also holds the tomb of Thomas Jones of Llantysilio Hall. He left no will and this led to two grave robbing incidents looking for the will. The second attempt was thwarted by the church warden who summoned the police.

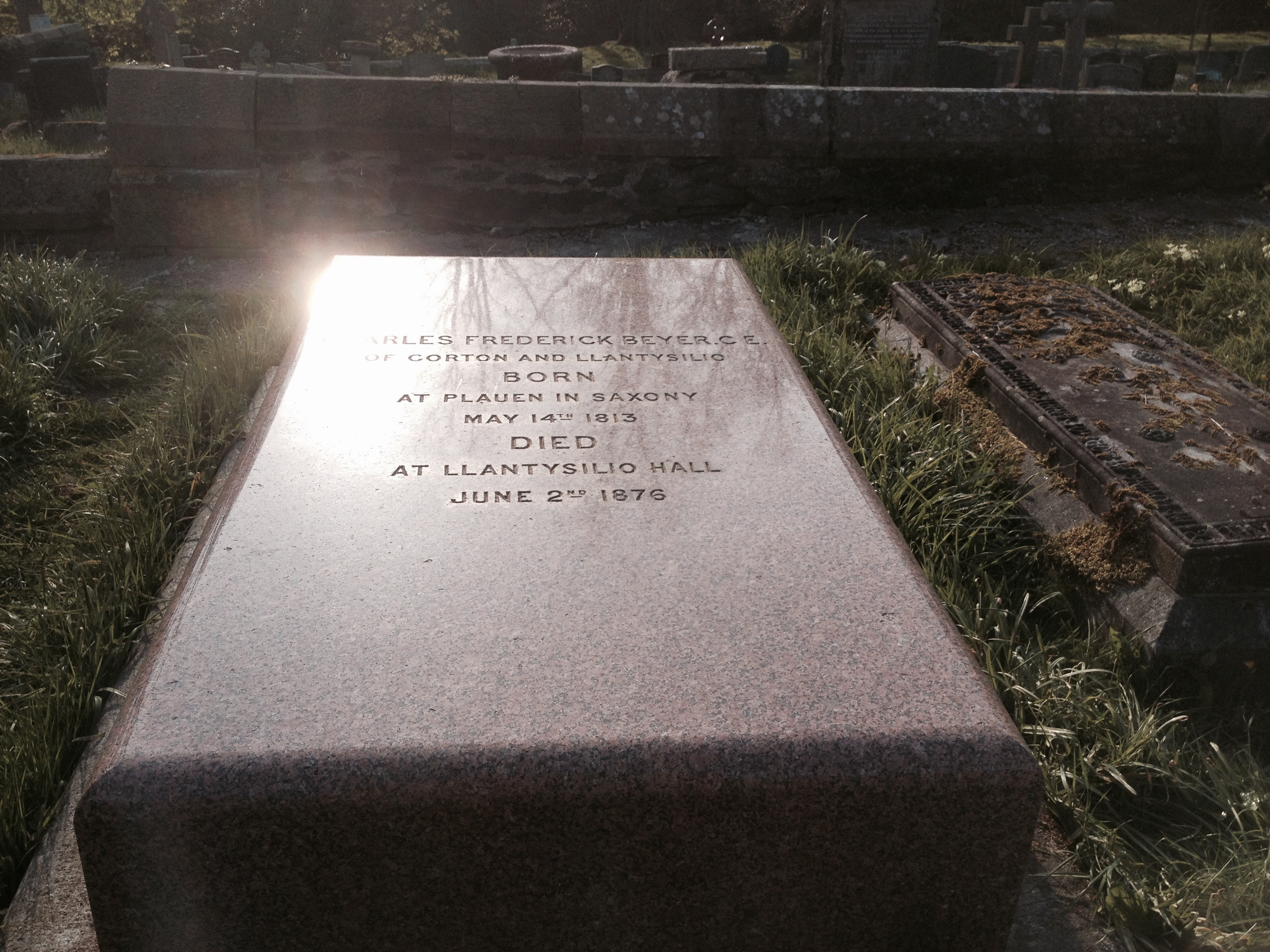
Beyer grave (photographed in 2015)
