= John Faucit Saville =

English actor, playwright and theatre manager

John Faucit Savill or Saville, also known as John Savill(e) Faucit, stage name Mr Faucit, (1783?–1853) was an English actor, playwright and theatre manager. He married Harriet Diddear, later known as Harriet Elizabeth Savill and as Mrs Faucit. They had six children including the actress Helena Faucit (also known as Helen).
