= William Farren (actor, born 1825) =

English actor (1825–1908)

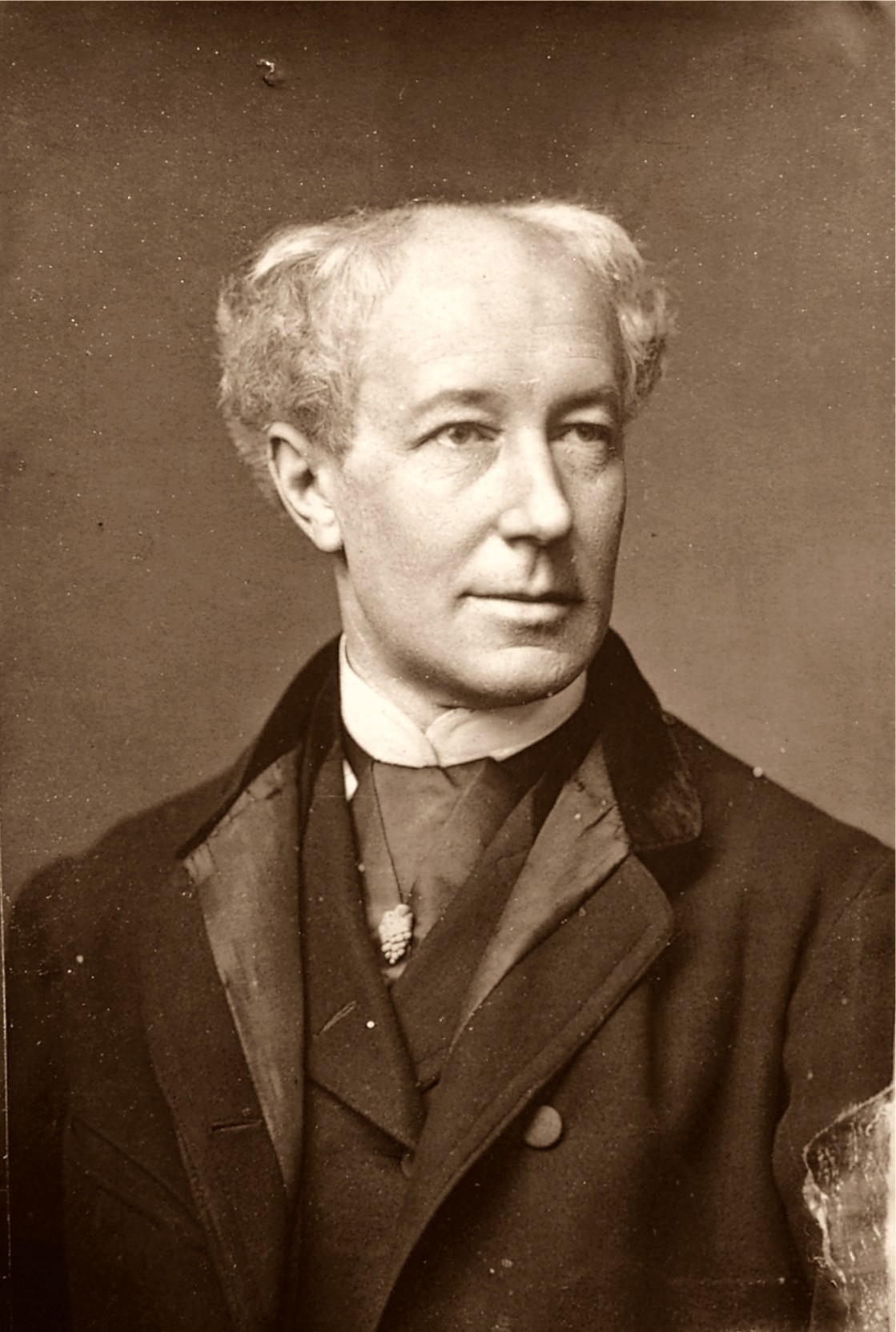
- Born: 28 September 1825; Kensington, London, England, United Kingdom
- Died: 25 September 1908 (aged 82); Siena, Tuscany, Italy
- Occupation: Actor
- Years active: 1848 – 1899

William Farren (28 September 1825 – 25 September 1908) was an English actor.

== Life ==
He was born in London, the son of actor William Farren (1786–1861), brother of Henry Farren (1826–1860) and uncle of Nellie Farren.

Beginning life as a vocalist, 'young William Farren' sang at the Antient Concerts in 1848. Turning to the stage, he, after slight training in the country, made his London début in the name of Forrester at the Strand Theatre, under his father's management, on 6 September 1849. On 5 March 1850 he was the original Moses in Sterling Coyne's version of 'The Vicar of Wakefield.' Later in the year he accompanied his father to the new Olympic, and acted under the name of William Farren, jun. In January 1852 he appeared as Cassio to his brother Henry's Othello, and was credited with promise.

On 28 March 1853, he made his first appearance at the Haymarket, under Buckstone, as Captain Absolute, and was identified with the fortunes of that house either in juvenile tragedy or light comedy until 1867.

His more interesting roles were Guibert in Browning's 'Colombo's Birthday' (25 April 1853), the leading part in Bayle Bernard's new play, 'A Life's Trial,' in March 1857, Mercury in Burnand's farcical comedy, 'Venus and Adonis' (28 March 1864), and Romeo on 31 August 1867, in October 1869 he was engaged by Mrs. John Wood for the St. James's, where he appeared as Brizard in Daly's version of 'Frou Frou' (25 May 1870), and Arthur Minton in 'Two Thorns' (4 March 1871), in which he struck the critic Dutton Cook as happily combining

ease of manner with due impressiveness of delivery.

On 9 September 1871, Farren migrated to the Vaudeville, with which he was long associated. There he was the original Sir Geoffrey Champneys in H. J. Byron's comedy 'Our Boys' on 16 January 1875, and played the part, without intermission, until July 1878. Subsequently, he was seen at the Royal Aquarium (afterwards Imperial Theatre) as Grandfather Whitehead (9 November 1878), in which he was deemed inferior in pathos to his father; as young Marlow; as Archer in 'The Beaux' Stratagem' (Oct. 1879); as Sir Robert Bramble in The Poor Gentleman; and as Adam in Miss Litton's revival of 'As You Like It' — a role which he repeated later at the opening of the Shaftesbury Theatre (20 October 1888). Returning to the Vaudeville, he was Seth Pecksniff in 'Tom Pinch' (10 March 1881) and Sir Peter Teazle in the elaborate revival of 'The School for Scandal' (4 Feb. 1882). That part he resumed at the Criterion in April 1891 and at the Lyceum in June 1896. On 9 Dec. 1882 he challenged further comparison with his father by playing Sir Anthony Absolute. Subsequent parts included Colonel Damas at the Lyceum to the Pauline Deschappelles of Miss Mary Anderson (27 October 1883).

In 1887, in conjunction with H. B. Conway, Farren started the Conway-Farren old comedy company at the Strand, appearing there as Lord Ogleby in 'The Clandestine Marriage,' old Domton, and other characters. At the Criterion on 27 November 1890, he played with great acceptance his father's original part of Sir Harcourt Courtly in 'London Assurance.' After 1896, his appearances on the stage were confined to occasional performances of Simon Ingot in 'David Garrick' with (Sir) Charles Wyndham. On his retirement in 1898, he settled at Rome. He died at Siena on 25 September 1908, and was buried there.

== Assessment ==
Farren, like his father, ripened slowly. It was not until middle age, when juvenile roles were abandoned, that he gradually established himself in public favour. One of the last of the traditional representatives of the Sir Anthony Absolutes and Mr. Hardcastles of classic English comedy, he achieved in Sir Peter Teazle, according to the critics of 1896, 'a masterpiece of sheer virtuosity,' but he lacked his father's powers, and his gifts of humorous expression were confined to the dry and caustic.

== Family ==
In 1846, Farren married Josephine Elizabeth Davies, who was not connected with the stage, and by her had as surviving issue a daughter, who lived privately, and a son, Percy, an actor, known while his father was on the stage (from 1882) as William Farren, junior, and subsequently as William Farren. In 1908 Percy Farren, under the name William Farren, appeared in Alfred Sutro's play The Builder of Bridges at St James's Theatre. He made his first London appearance in 1880 and made several acting tours in the USA.

== Sources ==
- Carol J. Carlisle. "Farren, William (1825–1908)". Oxford Dictionary of National Biography (online ed.). Oxford University Press. doi:10.1093/ref:odnb/33090. (Subscription, Wikipedia Library access or UK public library membership required.)
- http://www.emich.edu/public/english/adelphi_calendar/perfactr.htm
- http://www.npg.org.uk/collections/search/person.php?LinkID=mp89050
