= Edward Dutton Cook =

British dramatic critic and author

Dutton Cook
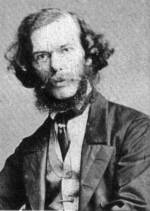
- Born: 30 January 1829; Brunswick Square, London
- Died: 11 September 1883 (aged 54)
- Resting place: Highgate cemetery
- Spouse: Linda Scates
- Writing career
- Notable works: Pall Mall Gazette column; Dictionary of National Biography
- Literary movement: Artists' Rifles, Ramblers' Club

Edward Dutton Cook (30 January 1829 – 11 September 1883) was a British dramatic critic and author.

== Life ==
Cook's father was George Simon Cook of Grantham, Lincolnshire, a solicitor, of the firm of Le Blanc & Cook, 18 New Bridge Street, Blackfriars, London, who died on 12 September 1852, leaving a family of nine children.

Edward Dutton, the second son, was born at 9 Grenville Street, Brunswick Square, London, on 30 January 1829. At the age of six he went to a school kept by a Miss Boswell at Haverstock Hill, was removed to another school at Bradmore House, Chiswick, and finally, about 1843, entered King's College School. Having completed his education, he was articled to his father, and remained in his office about four years, when he obtained a situation in the Madras Railway Company's office in New Broad Street, city of London, and in his spare time followed his artistic and literary tastes.

As soon as he was able to do so he left the railway company and devoted himself entirely to literature as a profession. Having studied painting under Rolt, and learned engraving, he at one time sought employment on Punch as a draughtsman on wood. In 1859 he became a member of the Artists' Rifles, and also a member of the Ramblers' Club, which met every night from November to May at Dick's Tavern, 8 Fleet Street. About this period, in conjunction with Mr. Leopold Lewis, he wrote a melodrama entitled The Dove and the Serpent, which was produced with much success, under Mr. Nelson Lee's management, at the City of London Theatre.

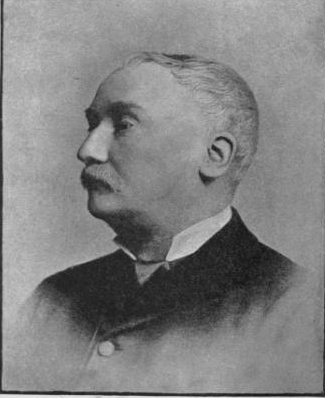
Dutton Cook in 1883

From 1867 to October 1875 he was dramatic critic to the Pall Mall Gazette, and from that date to his death to the World newspaper. He was the writer of numerous articles on art topics in various reviews, newspapers, and periodicals, and the author of many works of fiction. Of the latter, Paul Foster's Daughter, his first work, served to establish his reputation, and the production of The Trials of the Tredgolds in the following year (1862) in Temple Bar was a great literary success. His later novels did not maintain the popularity which his earlier works achieved. This was from no lack of merit, but because he was not sufficiently sensational in his style to suit the spirit and fashion of the period. He was one of the contributors to the Dictionary of National Biography, and furnished the dramatic and theatrical lives in letter A to the first and second volumes.

He died suddenly of heart disease on 11 September 1883, and was buried on the eastern side of Highgate Cemetery on 15 September. He lies in an unmarked plot (no.25760) on the south side of the southern path, to the right of the Booth grave.

== Family ==
On 20 August 1874 he married Linda Scates (second daughter of Joseph Scates), a pupil of the Royal Academy of Music and a well-known pianist, by whom he left one daughter, named Sylvia after the heroine of her father's first novel.

== Works ==
1. Paul Foster's Daughter 1861
2. Leo 1863
3. A Prodigal Son 1863
4. The Trials of the Tredgolds 1864
5. Sir Felix Foy, Bart. 1865
6. Hobson's Choice 1867
7. Dr. Muspratt's Patients, and other Stories 1868
8. Over Head and Ears 1868
9. Art in England, Notes and Studies 1869
10. Young Mr. Nightingale. A Novel 1874
11. The Banns of Marriage 1875
12. A Book of the Play: Studies and Illustrations of Histrionic Story, Life, and Character 1876, three editions
13. Doubleday's Children 1877
14. Hours with the Players 1881
15. Nights at the Play, a view of the English Stage 1883
16. On the Stage: Studies of Theatrical History and the Actor's Art 1883
