= Kate Denin =

American actress

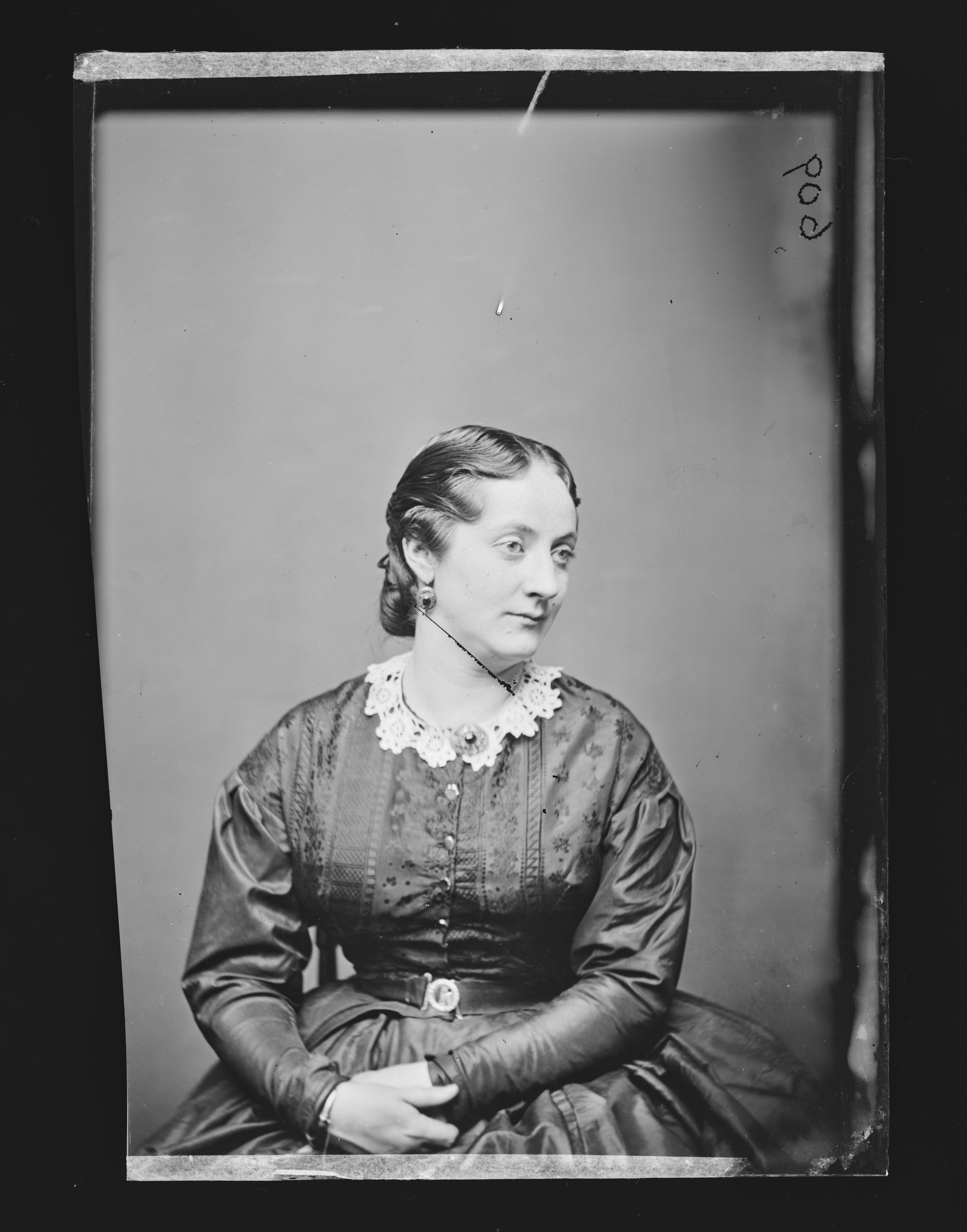
Kate Denin c.1860-1870

Kate Denin (c. 1837 Philadelphia – 5 February 1907 New York City) was an American stage actress. She played in nearly every theatre in the United States and Australia and with most of the noted American actors and actresses of her time.

== Biography ==
Her father died when she was an infant, and when she was four years old, her mother married an actor, John Winans; her stage career began at once. She played many juvenile parts in the Chatham Street Theatre and the Old Bowery Theatre. When she was 14, she played Romeo to her sister Susan's Juliet, and toured the United States in that part. She moved to California in 1854, and in 1857 she moved to Australia.

Denin returned to the eastern United States in October 1881, performing in Esmerelda at Madison Square Garden on October 29. The play was produced by a youthful Daniel Frohman.

== Stage career ==
Among Denin's most noteworthy roles include the parts of 'Julia' in The Hunchback of Notre-Dame, and of 'Claude Melnotte' in Lady of Lyons. These she performed in 1854 at the National Theatre and the Chicago Theatre, respectively. Both venues were located in Chicago, Illinois.

Denin played with her sister Susan in productions of King John and Richard III. They often appeared as the two 'Antipholi' in The Comedy of Errors.

Denin was essentially a comedian, as was Sam Ryan who accompanied her in theatrical productions. McKee Rankin acted with them and usually embellished their performances with more serious roles.

== Marriages ==
Denin was married to C. K. Fox before leaving for the western United States without him. Later she married Ryan, prior to migrating to Australia. In 1860, she married John Wilson and afterward played in his company.
