= Henry Farren =

English actor

Henry Farren (1826?–1860), was an English actor known mostly in comedy. Beginning his career in plays in the British provinces starring his actor father, William Farren, Henry played in London for several years before moving to America, where he died in St. Louis. His daughter Nellie Farren became a famous player in Victorian burlesque.

== Biography ==
Farren was the son of William Farren, and his brother was another actor, William Farren Jr.

In 1846, Farren played Mercutio in Romeo and Juliet at the Theatre Royal, Birmingham and at the Theatre Royal, Manchester. He also played Charles Plastic in Town and Country, and Charles Surface to the Sir Peter Teazle of his father in The School for Scandal. He is believed to have made his first appearance in London at the Haymarket Theatre about 1847, again playing Charles Surface to his father's Teazle. In October of that year, he played at the same theatre in a comedy entitled My Wife! What Wife? by Eaton S. Barrett. Farren was declared by the Theatrical Times to be "the facsimile of his father". Later that year at the Haymarket, he was Arthur Courtnay in a comedy by Sullivan entitled Family Pride, in which his father was Doctor Dodge.

When his father left the Haymarket to assume the management of the Strand Theatre and the Olympic Theatres, Henry accompanied him, playing mostly leading parts in comedy. At the Olympic in November 1850, he created the role of Fontaine in Westland Marston's Philip of France and Marie de Méranie. The next year, he was in the Ladies' Battle, an adaptation of Eugène Scribe's Bataille de Dames. Later that year, he was Claude Melnotte in The Lady of Lyons opposite Laura Keene, who was making her first appearance as Pauline. He briefly managed the Brighton Theatre. After his father's retirement in 1855, he went to America and appeared at the Broadway Theatre, New York, as Claude Melnotte. He then toured, finally settling down as manager of the theatre at St. Louis, where he died. He left a second wife, whom he married shortly before his death.

His daughter Florence acted at the Victoria Theatre and the Gaiety Theatre, London, before she married Edward Wroughton. Another daughter, "Nellie", was a well-known actress in Victorian burlesque and other comedy at the Gaiety, among other theatres.
