= Harma Photoplays =

Harma Photoplays, also known as Harma's British Photoplays, was a film production company in England. It was owned by H. M. Jenks (Harry Maze Jenks) and managed by Henry Howse. Its address was listed at 101 Wardpur Street in London and at 16, Limes Road, Croydon, Surrey.

Reuben Gillmer wrote some of its films. Marjorie Villis, Bernard Dudley, and James Knight worked for the studio.

== Filmography ==
- The White Star, (1915), production company Holmfirth Films, distributed by Harma Photoplays
- The House of Fortescue (1916), production company Hepworth Pictures, distributed by Harma Photoplays
- The Little Damozel (1916), production company Clarendon, distributed by Harma Photoplays Release
- The Man Behind 'The Times' (1917), production company Hepworth Pictures, distributed by Harma Photoplays
- Home Sweet Home (1917)
- Her Marriage Lines (1917), Production company Hepworth Pictures, distributed by Harma Photoplays
- The American Heiress (1917) Hepworth Picture Plays, distributed by Harma Photoplays
- The Happy Warrior (1917), Thornton Production company Harma Photoplays Distributed by Harma Photoplays
- The Cobweb (1917)
- The Great Impostor (1918), Production company Harma Photoplays Distributed by Harma Photoplays
- Big Money
- A Romany Lass (1918)
- Where's Watling?
- The Splendid Coward (1918)
- Deception
- What a Life
- Kiss Me
- Nature's Gentleman (1918)
- A Master of Men (1918) by E. Phillips Oppenheim (novel). The film starred Malcolm Keen.
- Ava Maria (1918)
- The Warrior Strain (1919)
- The Man Who Forgot (1919 film) (1919)
- The Power of Right (1919)
- The Knave of Hearts (1919)
- The Silver Greyhound (1919), starring James Knight
- The Sands of Time (1919)
