= The Power of Right =

- Directed by: Floyd Martin Thornton
- Written by: Reuben Gillmer
- Starring: James Knight; Evelyn Boucher; Frank Petley; Leslie Reardon
- Production company: Harma Photoplays
- Distributed by: Harma Photoplays
- Release date: March 1919
- Country: United Kingdom
- Languages: Silent; English intertitles

The Power of Right is a 1919 British silent war film directed by Floyd Martin Thornton and starring James Knight, Evelyn Boucher and Frank Petley. The film had strong similarities to The Warrior Strain, which also featured the Prince of Wales (future king Edward VIII) and direction from Thornton.

== Cast ==
- James Knight as Gerald Stafford
- Evelyn Boucher as Elsie Vigor
- Frank Petley as Danvers
- Leslie Reardon as Leslie Stafford
- Sydney Grant
- Clifford Pembroke
- John Gliddon
- Adeline Hayden Coffin
- Prince of Wales as himself
- Marjorie Villis

== Bibliography ==
- Bamford, Kenton. Distorted Images: British National Identity and Film in the 1920s. I.B. Tauris, 1999.
