= The Happy Warrior =

The Happy Warrior or Happy Warrior may refer to:

- "Character of the Happy Warrior", an 1806 poem by Wordsworth, source of a metaphor "the happy warrior"
- The Happy Warrior, an 1884 painting by George Frederic Watts
- The Happy Warrior, a 1912 novel by A. S. M. Hutchinson
- The Happy Warrior (1917 film), a 1917 film directed by F. Martin Thornton, based on the novel by Hutchinson
- The Happy Warrior (1925 film), a 1925 American silent drama film
- Al Smith (1873–1944), American politician, named "the Happy Warrior of the political battlefield" by Franklin D. Roosevelt
- Hubert Humphrey (1911–1978), American politician, nicknamed "The Happy Warrior"
- Tim Walz (born 1964), American politician, nicknamed "the Happy Warrior" in allusion to Humphrey
- The Happy Warrior, a biography of Churchill in the form of a comic strip, drawn by Frank Bellamy
- The Happy Warrior, a 1960 biography of West Indian cricketer Collie Smith by Ken Chaplin
- Roxanne Modafferi (born 1982), American female mixed martial artist
- "Happy Warrior", a 2017 episode of "Elements" from Adventure Time
- Happy Warrior: Political Memoirs, the 1988 autobiography of Donald C. MacDonald, Canadian politician
