= If Thou Wert Blind =

1917 film

If Thou Wert Blind is a 1917 British silent drama film directed by Henry Edwards and Floyd Martin Thornton and starring Ben Webster, Evelyn Boucher and Joan Legge.

== Cast ==
- Ben Webster - Hayden Strong
- Evelyn Boucher - Christine Leslie
- Joan Legge - May Barton
- Minna Grey
- Clifford Pembroke
- Sydney Lewis Ransome
- Harry Lorraine
