= Lorna Doone (disambiguation) =

Lorna Doone is a novel by Richard Doddridge Blackmore. Adaptations include:

- Lorna Doone (1912 film), directed by Wilfred Noy
- Lorna Doone (1922 film), directed by Maurice Tourneur
- Lorna Doone (1934 film), directed by Basil Dean
- Lorna Doone (1951 film), starring Barbara Hale and Richard Greene
- Lorna Doone (1963 TV series), a 1963 adaptation of the novel in the form of a TV series
- Lorna Doone (1976 TV series), a 1976 TV miniseries by the BBC, starring Emily Richard and John Sommerville
- Lorna Doone (1990 film), a 1990 British drama television film for ITV starring Sean Bean
- Lorna Doone (2000 film), a television movie directed by Mike Barker

Lorna Doone may also refer to:

- Lorna Doone (cookie), a Nabisco product
- Lorna Doone was one of the GWR 3031 Class locomotives that were built for and ran on the Great Western Railway between 1891 and 1915
- PS Lorna Doone, a paddle steamer operated by the Red Funnel line in England 1891–1947
- "Lorna Doone" is Cockney rhyming slang for spoon.

== See also ==
- Lorna Doom, best known as the bass guitarist for the punk rock band the Germs
