= The Knave of Hearts (1919 film) =

- Directed by: Floyd Martin Thornton
- Written by: Reuben Gillmer
- Starring: James Knight; Evelyn Boucher; Harry Agar Lyons; Adeline Hayden Coffin
- Cinematography: Phil Ross
- Production company: Harma Photoplays
- Distributed by: Harma Photoplays
- Release date: July 1919
- Running time: 5 reels
- Country: United Kingdom
- Languages: Silent; English intertitles

The Knave of Hearts is a 1919 British silent romance film directed by Floyd Martin Thornton and starring James Knight, Evelyn Boucher and Harry Agar Lyons.

== Cast ==
- James Knight as Lord Hillsdown
- Evelyn Boucher as Peggy Malvern
- Harry Agar Lyons as Earl of Brinmore
- J. Edwards Barker as Oliver Slade
- Arthur J. Mayne as Sir Guy
- Adeline Hayden Coffin
- Lottie Blackford
- Nessie Blackford

== Bibliography ==
- Low, Rachael. History of the British Film, 1918-1929. George Allen & Unwin, 1971.
