= Eugenia Żmijewska =

Polish novelist and translator

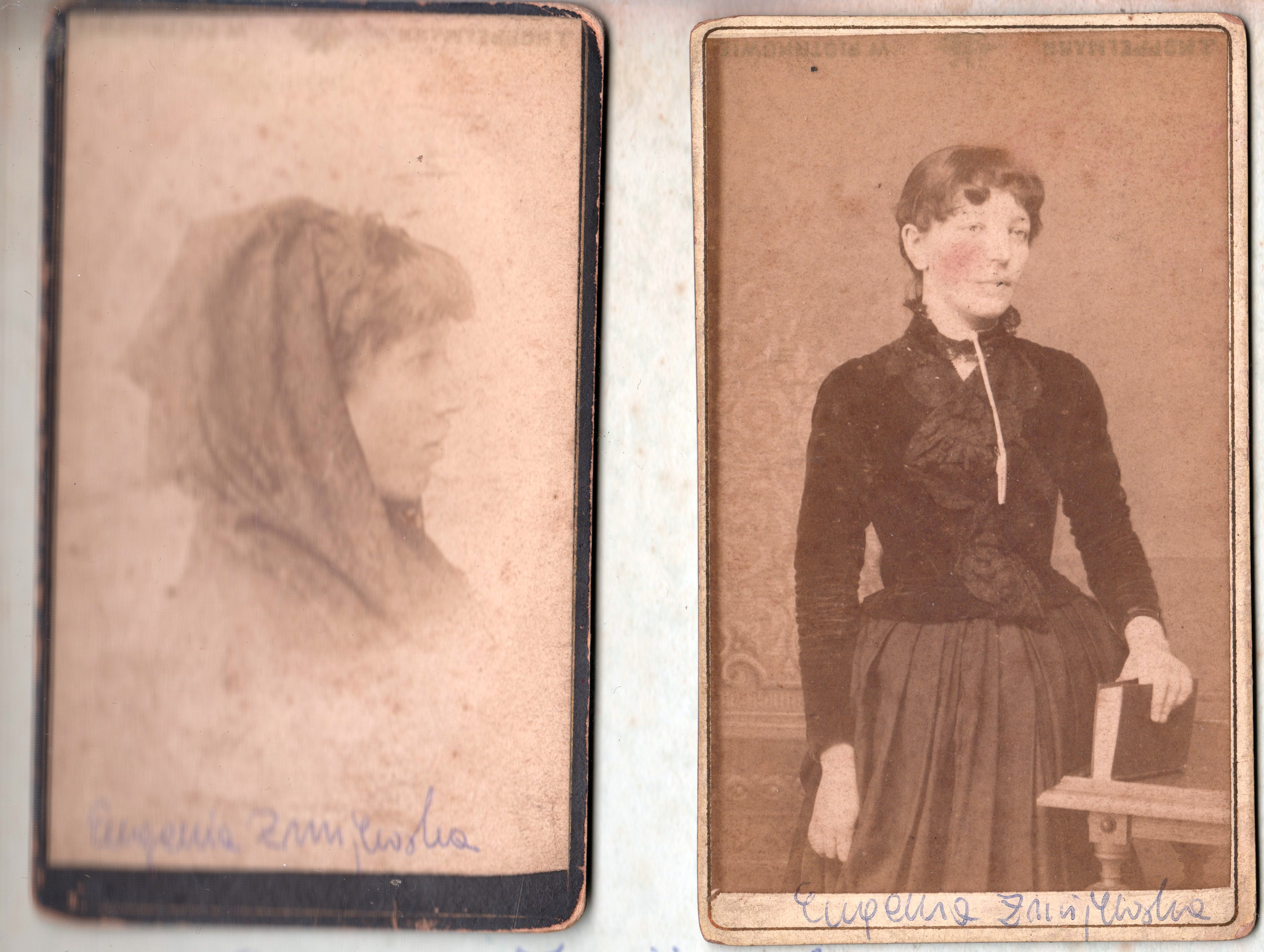
- Eugenia Żmijewska in her youth
- Born: 1865; Uman, Ukraine
- Died: 1923 (aged 57–58); Warsaw, Poland

Eugenia Żmijewska (1865, Uman, Ukraine – 1923, Warsaw, Poland) was a Polish novelist, current affairs writer and literary translator.

== Biography ==
Her literary work revolved mainly around women's sexual identity and its development in more mature years. This is exemplified in her main body of work, a trilogy, which focuses on a woman who is in an unsuccessful romantic relationship, tries to focus on a professional career as an editor but eventually marries and compromises her ambitions.

She worked at Słowa, as an editor and writer. From the year 1899 she was the editor of the monthly supplement Ognisko for the magazine Kurier Polski which was active from 1829 to 1831 in Warsaw. From 1914 onwards she was an editor for Świat Kobiety.

She was one of the founders of the Polish Writers and Journalists Association.

== Novels ==
- 1907 – Little Flame: From the Diary of an Institute Girl
- 1909 – Fate
- 1911 – Sweetheart
- 1912 – Młodzi
- 1921 – Car i unitka
- 1910 – From the diary of a failed
- 1912 – Z daleka i z bliska
- 1913 – Scouts: Stories for the Polish Youth (Skauci: Powieść dla młodzieży)
- 1917 – Pole, a citizen

== Translations ==
She was the first ever translator of two of Arthur Conan Doyle's Sherlock Holmes novels The Sign of Four published in 1890 and The Hound of the Baskervilles published in 1902 to the Polish language.
