= Olive Wadsley =

English romance novelist (1885–1959)

Olive Mary Wadsley
- Born: July 15, 1885; Huntingdon, England
- Died: March 4, 1959 (aged 73); Surrey, England
- Occupation: Writer (novelist)
- Writing career
- Period: 20th century
- Genre: Romance fiction

Olive Mary Wadsley (July 1885 – 4 March 1959) was a British writer of romantic novels.

== Biography ==
Wadsley was born in Huntingdon, England. Her parents were George Edward Wadsley and Mary Elizabeth Hargrave. She was educated at Haus Sonderburg in Glücksburg, Germany and Chateau d'Aire in Geneva, Switzerland. After graduation she began writing short stories which were published in the Evening News and the Tatler. On one occasion she won the Evening News Serial Prize.

When she wrote her first novel it was immediately accepted and published by Cassell. Some of her books were adapted for film. Silent movie director Floyd Martin Thornton produced three of these including The Flame, Frailty, and Belonging. In all she wrote over 30 books.

Her books were not characterized as serious fiction but were popular in the retail trade. Kirkus Reviews wrote about Wait For Me, calling it "fancy dancy sentimentality ... high romantics, with the throb in the throat ...".

She died in Surrey on March 4, 1959.

== Works ==
- The Flame, (1913)
- Reality, (1914)
- Conquest, (1915)
- Possession, (1916)
- Frailty, (1917)
- Nevertheless, (1918)
- Instead, (1919)
- Belonging, (1920)
- Almond-Blossom, (1921)
- Sand, (1922)
- Sometimes, (1923)
- You And I, (1924)
- Shutters, (1926)
- The Clue, (1926)
- Fair Game, (1927)
- Traceries, (1928)
- First Love, (1928)
- Entanglements, (1929)
- Spring Dust, (1930)
- Fascination, (1930)
- Serenade, (1931)
- Cabaret, (1931)
- Tournamant, (1933)
- Racing Pace, (1933)
- Flood-Tide, (1934)
- First Spring, (1934)
- The Beloved Thief, (1934)
- At Last, (1934)
- Shadow Love, (1935)
- Secret Heart, (1935)
- Scarlet And White, (1935)
- Someday, (1936)
- Seventh Wave, (1937)
- Wait For Me, (1940)
- And One Was Mine, (1951)
- So Green The Grass, (1952)
