= The Sign of the Four =

1890 detective novel by Arthur Conan Doyle

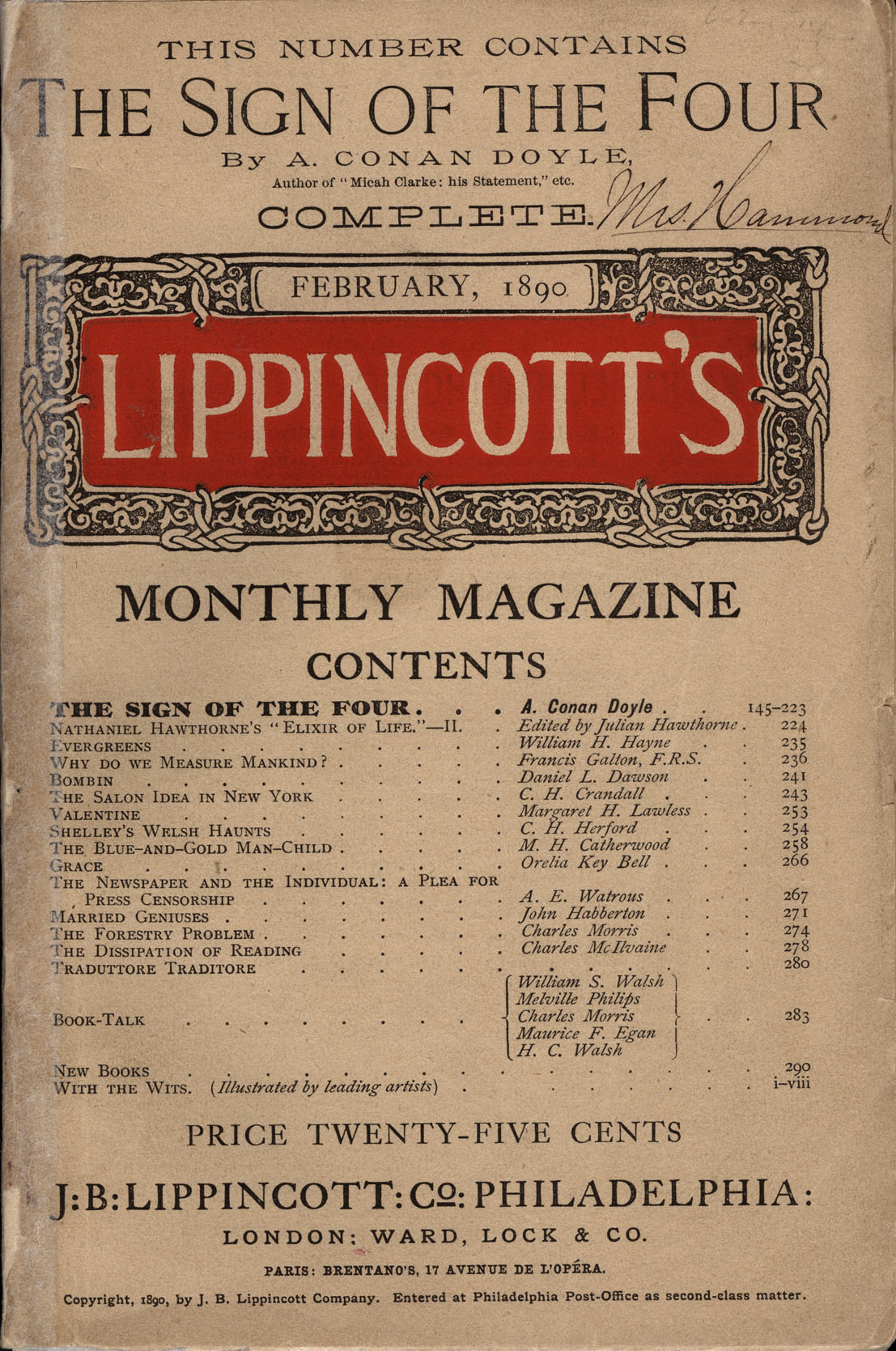
- Front cover of Lippincott’s Monthly Magazine (February 1890) in which The Sign of the Four was first published.
- Author: Arthur Conan Doyle
- Language: English
- Series: Sherlock Holmes
- Genre: Detective fiction
- Publisher: Lippincott's Monthly Magazine; Spencer Blackett (book)
- Publication date: February 1890
- Publication place: United Kingdom
- Preceded by: A Study in Scarlet
- Followed by: The Adventures of Sherlock Holmes
- Text: The Sign of the Four at Wikisource

How often have I said to you that when you have eliminated the impossible, whatever remains, however improbable, must be the truth?

— Sherlock Holmes, Chap. 6, p. 111

The Sign of the Four, also called The Sign of Four, is an 1890 detective novel, the second novel featuring Sherlock Holmes by British writer Sir Arthur Conan Doyle. Doyle wrote four novels and 56 short stories featuring the fictional detective.

== Plot ==
In 1888 Miss Mary Morstan arrives at the flat of Sherlock Holmes with a case. She explains that, ten years earlier, her father Captain Arthur Morstan disappeared immediately after arriving in London from his military service abroad. Mary contacted his friend, Major John Sholto, who denied having seen him. Four years later she received a valuable pearl in the post, a gift repeated every year for six years. With the sixth pearl, she also received a letter asking for a meeting, claiming that she is a "wronged woman".

Holmes takes the case and soon discovers that Major Sholto had died a week before Mary received the first pearl. The only further clue Mary can give Holmes is a map of a fortress found in her father's desk, appended with the words, "The Sign of the Four: Jonathan Small, Mahomet Singh, Abdullah Khan, Dost Akbar" and four small cross-like symbols.

Following the letter's instructions, Holmes, Watson and Mary go to the Lyceum Theatre, where they meet a coachman who takes them to the house of Major Sholto's son, Thaddeus, the anonymous sender of the pearls. He reveals that Captain Morstan did, in fact, visit Major Sholto, demanding his half of a treasure that Sholto had secretly brought back from India. In the ensuing quarrel, Captain Morstan suffered a heart attack and died, striking his head on the treasure box as he fell. Afraid he would be suspected of murder, Major Sholto buried the body and hid the treasure, leaving out a small gold chaplet studded with twelve pearls. Thaddeus and his twin brother Bartholomew only learned of this when their father revealed it while on his deathbed; he was about to reveal to them where the treasure was hidden, when a bearded man appeared at the window and the Major died of fear. The brothers tried and failed to catch the intruder and later on, found a note pinned to the Major's body which read "The Sign of Four". Thaddeus began sending Mary the pearls to make things right and the brothers searched for the treasure. Six years later, Bartholomew found and withheld it; Thaddeus then contacted Mary so they could both confront Bartholomew and demand their shares.

The party, now accompanied by Thaddeus, heads to Bartholomew's house, Pondicherry Lodge, Upper Norwood. As they enter, the worried housekeeper reveals that Bartholomew has locked himself in his laboratory and refuses to come out. Mary Morstan stays downstairs to comfort the housekeeper, while the others rush up to the laboratory; through the keyhole, they can see Bartholomew slumped in his chair, with a "fixed and unnatural grin" upon his face. Holmes and Watson break down the door, to discover Bartholomew in a state of rigor mortis. Upon further inspection of the body, Holmes discovers a poisonous thorn above Bartholomew's ear. The treasure box is also gone, though there is a hole in the ceiling where it used to be.

While the police wrongly take Thaddeus in as a suspect, Holmes deduces from footmarks and other clues that there are two persons involved in the murder: a one-legged white man named Jonathan Small, and a small Andamanese accomplice, who accidentally stepped in creosote. Borrowing a trained scent hound from a naturalist, Holmes traces the pair to a boat landing. Learning that Small has hired a steam launch named the Aurora, Holmes, with the help of the Baker Street Irregulars and his own disguises, traces the boat to a repair yard. In a police launch, Holmes and Watson pursue the Aurora when it flees the yard; the islander attempts to shoot a dart at Holmes, but is shot dead himself. Small attempts to flee, running the Aurora aground, but is captured. However, the treasure box is now empty; Small, not wanting to surrender the gems, had scattered them into the Thames during the chase.

Small confesses that he was once a soldier of the Third Buffs in India, and lost his right leg to a crocodile while bathing in the Ganges. He then became an overseer on an indigo plantation, but when the 1857 rebellion occurred, was forced to flee to the Agra fortress. While standing guard one night, he was overpowered by Sikh troopers, who gave him a choice; be killed, or help them waylay a man who serves an outlawed rajah and is bringing his jewellery to the fortress for safekeeping. The robbery and murder took place, but the crime was discovered, although the hidden jewels were not. Small and his accomplices were convicted and sentenced to penal servitude, and were transferred after some time to a prison in the Andaman Islands.

Small discovered that Major Sholto and Captain Morstan, who were guards at the convict barracks, had lost money playing cards. Small made a deal with the officers, that Sholto would recover the treasure and in return send a boat to pick up Morstan, Small and the Sikhs so they could all meet and divide it. However, Sholto stole the treasure for himself, returning to England after inheriting a fortune from his uncle. Morstan went after Sholto but never returned and Small vowed vengeance against Sholto. Four years later, Small escaped prison with the help of Tonga, an islander whose life he had once saved. It was the news of this escape that shocked Sholto into his fatal illness. Small arrived too late to hear of the treasure's location, but left the note in the room anyway as revenge for the treatment of himself and the Sikhs. When Bartholomew eventually found the treasure, Small only planned to steal it; however, a miscommunication led Tonga to kill Bartholomew before Small could stop him. Small decides the treasure brings nothing but bad luck to anyone who has it (death to Achmet and Bartholomew, fear and guilt to Major Sholto, imprisonment to Small himself).

Mary is left with no treasure, except the pearls, however, she and Watson have fallen in love over the course of the adventure. The loss of the treasure has removed any barriers there might have been between them and Watson reveals that he has proposed to Mary and she has accepted, much to the annoyance of Holmes.

== Publication history ==
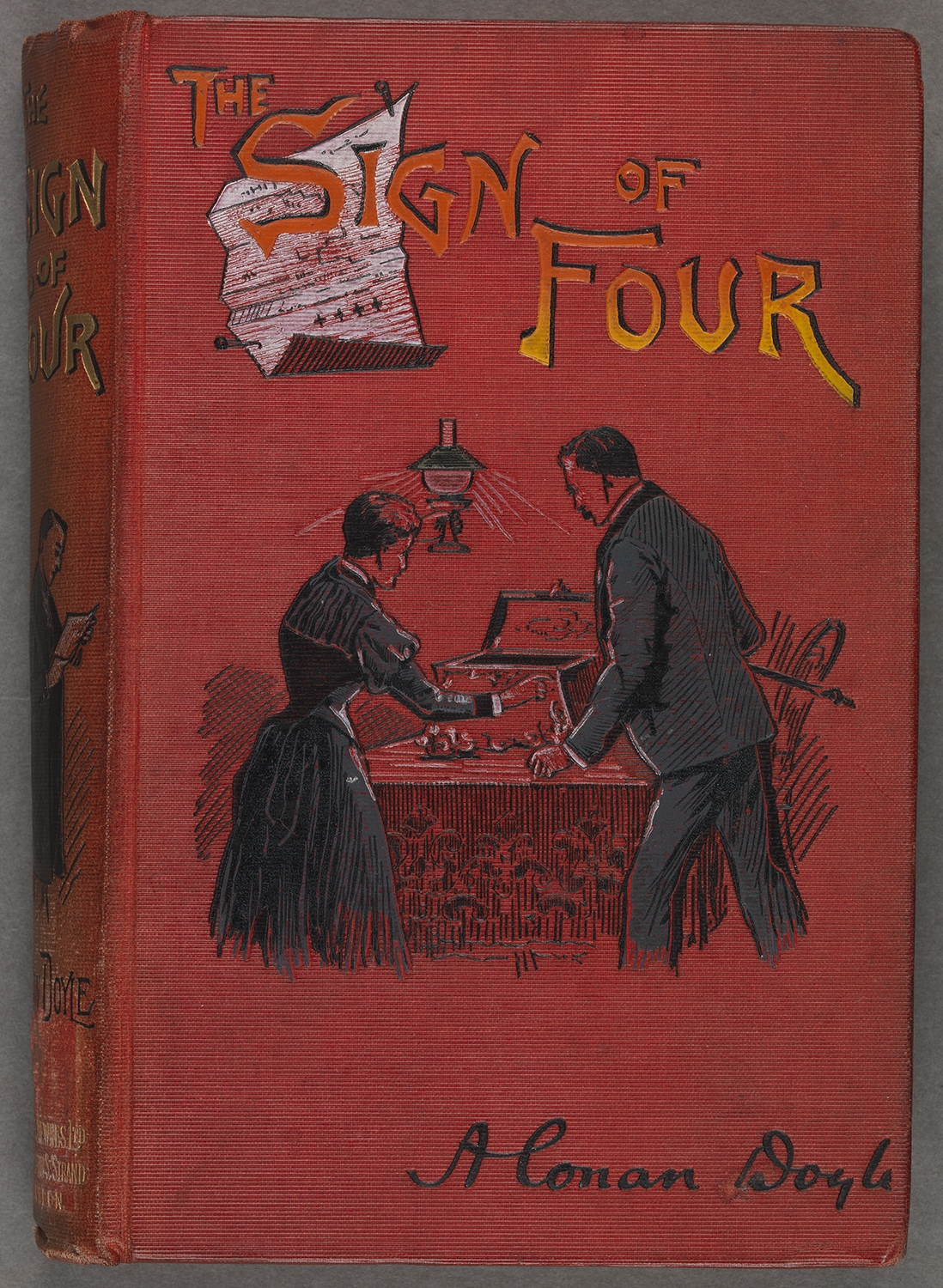
The 1892 cloth-bound cover of The Sign of Four after it was compiled as a single book

Sir Arthur Conan Doyle described how he was commissioned to write the story over a dinner with Joseph Marshall Stoddart, managing editor of the American publication Lippincott's Monthly Magazine, at the Langham Hotel in London on 30 August 1889. Stoddart wanted to produce an English version of Lippincott’s with a British editor and British contributors. The dinner was also attended by Oscar Wilde, who eventually contributed The Picture of Dorian Gray to the July 1890 issue. Doyle discussed what he called this "golden evening" in his 1924 autobiography Memories and Adventures.

The novel first appeared in the February 1890 edition of Lippincott's Monthly Magazine as The Sign of the Four; or The Problem of the Sholtos, appearing in both London and Philadelphia. The British edition of the magazine originally sold for a shilling, and the American for 25 cents. Surviving copies are now worth several thousand dollars.

Over the following few months, the novel was republished in several regional British journals. These re-serialisations gave the title as The Sign of Four. The novel was published in book form in October 1890 by Spencer Blackett, again using the title The Sign of Four. This edition included a frontispiece illustrated by Charles H. M. Kerr. The title of both the British and American editions of this first book edition omitted the second "the" of the original title.

A German edition of the book published in 1902 was illustrated by Richard Gutschmidt. An edition published by George Newnes Ltd in 1903 was illustrated by F. H. Townsend.

Different editions over the years have varied between the two forms of the title, with most editions favouring the four-word form. The actual text in the novel nearly always uses "the Sign of the Four" (the five-word form) to describe the symbol in the story, although the four-word form is used twice by Jonathan Small in his narrative at the end of the story.

As with the first story, A Study in Scarlet, produced two years previously, The Sign of the Four was not particularly successful initially. It was the short stories, published from 1891 onwards in Strand Magazine, that made household names of Sherlock Holmes and his creator.

== Adaptations ==
=== Television and film ===
There have been multiple film and television adaptations of the book:

Year	Media	Title	Country	Director	Holmes	Watson
1905	Film (silent)	Adventures of Sherlock Holmes; or, Held for Ransom	US	J. Stuart Blackton	Gilbert M. Anderson	Kyrle Bellew
1913	Film (silent)	Sherlock Holmes Solves the Sign of the Four	US	Lloyd Lonergan	Harry Benham	Charles Gunn
1923	Film (silent)	The Sign of Four	UK	Maurice Elvey	Eille Norwood	Arthur Cullin
1932	Film	The Sign of Four	UK	Graham Cutts	Arthur Wontner	Ian Hunter
1968	TV (series)	Sir Arthur Conan Doyle's Sherlock Holmes – "The Sign of Four"	UK	William Sterling	Peter Cushing	Nigel Stock
1974	TV	Das Zeichen der Vier (Le signe des quatre)	France/West Germany	Jean-Pierre Decourt	Rolf Becker	Roger Lumont
1983	TV (film)	The Sign of Four	UK	Desmond Davis	Ian Richardson	David Healy
1983	TV (series)	Sherlock Holmes and the Sign of Four (animated)	Australia	Ian Mackenzie; Alex Nicholas	Peter O'Toole (voice)	Earle Cross (voice)
1983	TV (series)	The Adventures of Sherlock Holmes and Dr. Watson – The Treasures of Agra (Сокровища Агры, Sokrovishcha Agry)	USSR	Igor Maslennikov	Vasily Livanov	Vitaly Solomin
1987	TV (film)	The Return of Sherlock Holmes	US	Kevin Connor	Michael Pennington	(n/a)
1987	TV (series)	The Return of Sherlock Holmes – "The Sign of Four"	UK	Peter Hammond	Jeremy Brett	Edward Hardwicke
1991	Filmed play	The Crucifer of Blood	US	Fraser Clarke Heston	Charlton Heston	Richard Johnson
1999	TV (series)	Sherlock Holmes in the 22nd Century – "The Sign of Four" (animated)	US/UK	Paul Quinn	Jason Gray-Stanford (voice)	John Payne (voice)
2001	TV (film)	The Sign of Four	Canada	Rodney Gibbons	Matt Frewer	Kenneth Welsh
2014	TV (series)	Sherlock – "The Sign of Three"	UK	Colm McCarthy	Benedict Cumberbatch	Martin Freeman
2014	TV (series)	Sherlock Holmes – "The Adventure of the Cheerful Four" (愉快な四人組の冒険, Yukai na yoningumi no bōken)	Japan	Kunio Yoshikawa	Kōichi Yamadera (voice)	Wataru Takagi (voice)

=== Radio and audio dramas ===
A radio adaptation of the story was broadcast on New York radio station WGY on 9 November 1922. The cast included Edward H. Smith as Sherlock Holmes, F. H. Oliver as Dr. Watson, and Viola Karwowska as Mary Morstan. It was produced as part of a series of adaptations of plays, so it is likely that the script was based on an existing stage adaptation of the story (one was written by John Arthur Fraser in 1901 and another by Charles P. Rice in 1903).

A six-part adaptation of the novel aired in the radio series The Adventures of Sherlock Holmes. Adapted by Edith Meiser, the episodes aired from 9 November 1932 to 14 December 1932, with Richard Gordon as Sherlock Holmes and Leigh Lovell as Dr. Watson.

The book was adapted by Felix Felton for the BBC Light Programme in 1959. Richard Hurndall played Holmes and Bryan Coleman played Watson.

On Saturday 2 March 1963, the story was dramatised by Michael Hardwick for the BBC Home Service as part of the 1952–1969 radio series, as a ninety-minute episode on Saturday-Night Theatre, with Carleton Hobbs as Holmes and Norman Shelley as Watson.

CBS Radio Mystery Theater aired a radio version of the story in 1977, starring Kevin McCarthy as Holmes and Court Benson as Watson.

The Sign of the Four was adapted for radio by Bert Coules in 1989 as part of BBC Radio 4's complete Sherlock Holmes 1989–1998 radio series, with Clive Merrison as Holmes, Michael Williams as Watson, and featuring Brian Blessed as Jonathan Small.

In 2016, the story was adapted as an episode of the American radio series The Classic Adventures of Sherlock Holmes, with John Patrick Lowrie as Holmes and Lawrence Albert as Watson.

In 2024, the podcast Sherlock&Co adapted the story in a ten-episode adventure called "The Sign of Four", starring Harry Attwell as Holmes, Paul Waggott as Watson, Marta da Silva as Mariana "Mrs. Hudson" Ametxazurra and Acushla-Tara Kupe as Mary Morstan.

=== Stage ===
Paul Giovanni's 1978 play The Crucifer of Blood is based on the novel. The Broadway premiere featured Paxton Whitehead as Holmes and Timothy Landfield as Watson. The 1979 London production featured Keith Michell as Holmes and Denis Lill as Watson.
