= The Little Breadwinner =

- Directed by: Wilfred Noy
- Written by: J.A. Campbell (play)
- Production company: Clarendon
- Distributed by: Clarendon
- Release date: June 1916
- Country: United Kingdom
- Languages: Silent; English intertitles

The Little Breadwinner is a 1916 British silent drama film directed by Wilfred Noy and starring Kitty Atfield and Maureen O'Hara.

== Bibliography ==
- Denis Gifford. The Illustrated Who's Who in British Films. B.T. Batsford, 1978.
