= Frank Petley =

English actor (1872–1945)

- Postcard, circa 1905
- Born: 26 March 1872; Charlton, London, England
- Died: 12 January 1945 (aged 72); Buxton, Derbyshire, England
- Occupations: Stage and film actor

Frank Petley (sometimes credited as Frank B. or Frank E. Petley) (28 March 1872 – 12 January 1945) was a British actor prominent in the Edwardian theatre and silent era cinema. During the Second World War he performed with The Old Vic Company then based at the Liverpool Playhouse, appearing as Nat Miller in Ah, Wilderness! by Eugene O'Neill in a production by Noel Willman.

== Selected filmography ==
- The Chance of a Lifetime (1916)
- Diana and Destiny (1916)
- Ye Wooing of Peggy (1917)
- Nature's Gentleman (1918)
- The Silver Greyhound (1919)
- The Power of Right (1919)
- The Iron Stair (1920)
- The Flame (1920)
- My Lord Conceit (1921)
- The Golden Dawn (1921)
- The Mystery of Mr. Bernard Brown (1921)
- Melody of Death (1922)
- Night Ride (1937)
