= The Sign of Four (1923 film) =

1923 film

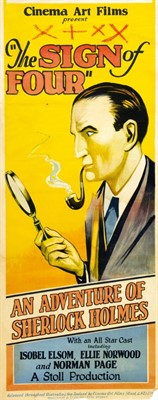
- Film poster
- Directed by: Maurice Elvey
- Written by: Maurice Elvey
- Based on: The Sign of Four by Arthur Conan Doyle
- Produced by: Jeffrey Bernerd
- Starring: Eille Norwood; Isobel Elsom; Arthur M. Cullin
- Production company: Stoll Pictures
- Distributed by: Stoll Pictures (UK); UFA (Germany)
- Release date: 1923
- Running time: 7 reels; 6750 feet
- Country: United Kingdom
- Language: English

The Sign of Four is a 1923 British silent mystery film directed by Maurice Elvey and starring Eille Norwood, Isobel Elsom and Fred Raynham. The film is based on the 1890 novel The Sign of the Four by Arthur Conan Doyle, and was one of a series of Sherlock Holmes films starring Norwood.

== Premise ==
Holmes and Watson are called in to investigate a strange murder in South London which appears to have its roots in events in India some years before.

== Production ==
Previous Watson performer Hubert Willis was replaced by Arthur M. Cullin in the role as director Maurice Elvey felt that Willis was too old to woo the much younger Isobel Elsom as Mary Morstan. Norwood was unimpressed with Cullin in the role although Cullin brought previous experience having played Watson to H. A. Saintsbury's Holmes in The Valley of Fear.

The climactic chase on the Thames was shot on location.

== Cast ==
- Eille Norwood as Sherlock Holmes
- Isobel Elsom as Mary Morstan
- Fred Raynham as Prince Abdullah Khan
- Arthur M. Cullin as Doctor John Watson
- Norman Page as Jonathan Small
- Humberston Wright as Doctor Sholto
- Henry Wilson as Pygmy
- Madame d'Esterre as Mrs Hudson
- Arthur Bell as Inspector Athelney Jones

== See also ==
- Sherlock Holmes (Stoll film series)
