= Diana and Destiny =

1916 British film by Floyd Martin Thornton

- Directed by: Floyd Martin Thornton
- Produced by: Floyd Martin Thornton
- Starring: Evelyn Boucher; Wyndham Guise; Roy Travers; Frank Petley
- Production company: Windsor Films
- Distributed by: Gaumont British Distributors
- Release date: October 1916
- Running time: 5 reels
- Country: United Kingdom
- Languages: Silent; English intertitles

Diana and Destiny is a 1916 British silent drama film directed by Floyd Martin Thornton and starring Evelyn Boucher, Wyndham Guise and Roy Travers. It was made at Catford Studios, and based on a 1905 novel by Charles Garvice.

== Cast ==
- Evelyn Boucher as Diana
- Wyndham Guise as William Bourne
- Roy Travers
- Frank Petley
- Harry Royston
- Harry Agar Lyons
- Ernie Collins
- Greta Wood

== Bibliography ==
- Low, Rachael. History of the British Film, 1914-1918. Routledge, 2005.
