= The Man Who Forgot (1919 film) =

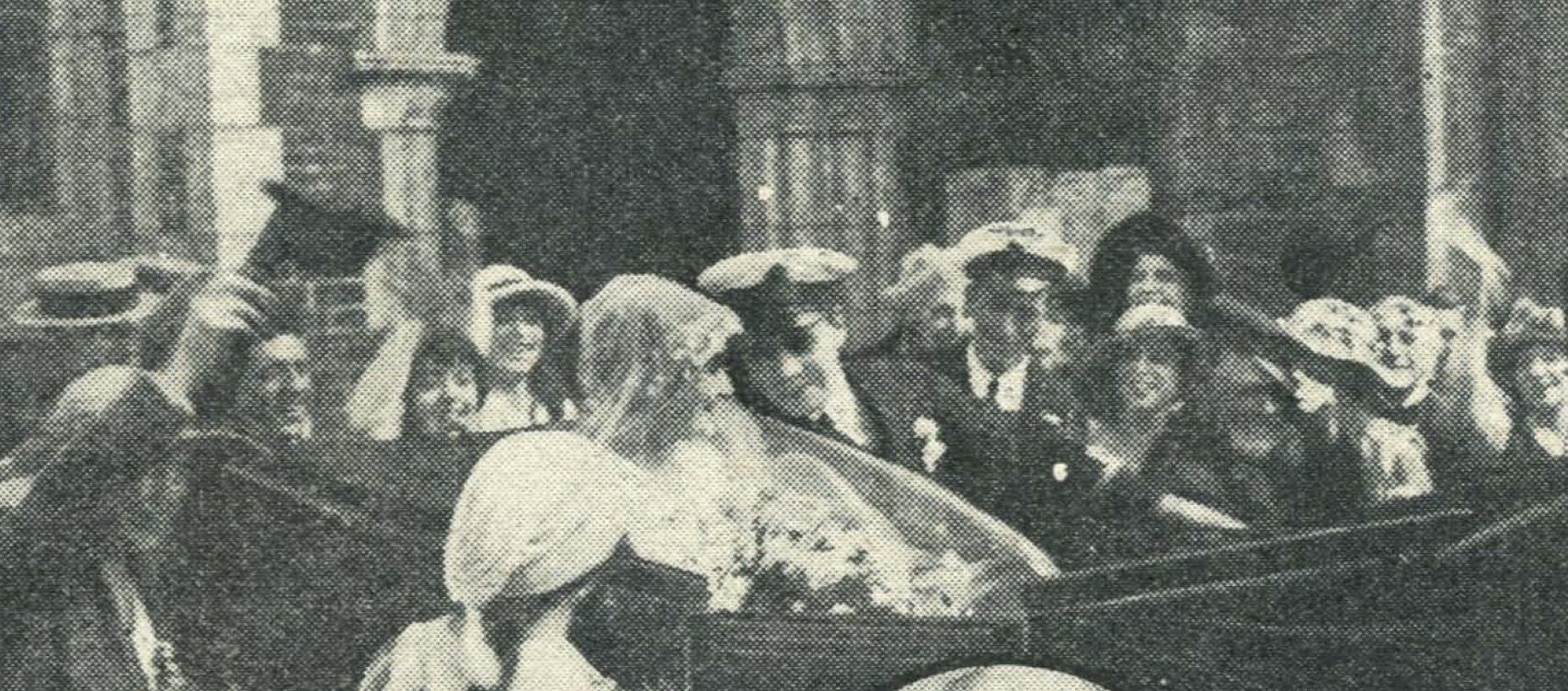
- Wedding scene from the film
- Directed by: Floyd Martin Thornton
- Written by: Reuben Gillmer
- Starring: James Knight; Marjorie Villis; Bernard Dudley; Evelyn Boucher
- Production company: Harma Photoplays
- Distributed by: Harma Photoplays
- Release date: September 1919
- Running time: 6 reels
- Country: United Kingdom
- Languages: Silent; English intertitles

The Man Who Forgot is a 1919 British silent drama film directed by Floyd Martin Thornton and starring James Knight, Marjorie Villis and Bernard Dudley.

The screenplay was written by Reuben Gillmer.

== Plot ==
After returning from the sea having lost and regained his memory, a sailor finds his fiancée is now married to another man.

== Cast ==
- James Knight as Seth Nalden
- Marjorie Villis as Mona Jennifer
- Bernard Dudley as Jim Hallibar
- Evelyn Boucher as Violet Selwyn
- Harry Agar Lyons as Tarpaulin Jack
- Mowbray Macks as Salty Felon

== Reception ==
A contemporary review noted: "The trade show of this charming tale of the Cornish (Yast was given at the West End Cinema on Monday. The beauty and tragedy of Reuben Gillmer’s sea story has been wonderfully well adapted. by F. Martin Thornton, who directs the show."

== Bibliography ==
- Low, Rachael. History of the British Film, 1918-1929. George Allen & Unwin, 1971.
