= Love's Old Sweet Song (disambiguation) =

"Love's Old Sweet Song" is a Victorian parlour song published in 1884.

Love's Old Sweet Song may also refer to:

- Love's Old Sweet Song (1917 film), a British silent drama film
- Love's Old Sweet Song (1923 film), a two-reel short film
- Love's Old Sweet Song (1933 film), a British romance film
