= The Melody of Death =

1915 novel by Edgar Wallace

- Author: Edgar Wallace
- Language: English
- Genre: Crime
- Publisher: Arrowsmith
- Publication date: 1915
- Publication place: United Kingdom
- Media type: Print

The Melody of Death is a 1915 crime novel by the British writer Edgar Wallace. Believing that he is suffering from a fatal illness a newly-married man begins to commit a series of crimes to make sure his wife will be provided for after his death.

== Film adaptation ==
In 1922 the story was turned into a silent film Melody of Death directed by Floyd Martin Thornton, one of a number of Wallace adaptations made by Stoll Pictures.

== Bibliography ==
- Clark, Neil. Stranger than Fiction: The Life of Edgar Wallace, the Man Who Created King Kong. The History Press, 2015.
- Goble, Alan. The Complete Index to Literary Sources in Film. Walter de Gruyter, 1999.
