= The Iron Stair =

The Iron Stair may refer to:

- The Iron Stair (novel), a crime novel by Rita
- The Iron Stair (1920 film), a British film adaptation directed by F. Martin Thornton
- The Iron Stair (1933 film), a British film adaptation directed by Leslie S. Hiscott
