= Master of Men =

Master of Men may refer to:

- Spider (pulp fiction character), an American pulp-magazine hero, with the by-name Master of Men
- Master of Men (film), a 1933 American drama film
- A Master of Men, a 1918 British silent film
