= My Lord Conceit =

1921 film

- Directed by: Floyd Martin Thornton
- Written by: Eliza Margaret Humphries (pseudonym "Rita"); F. Martin Thornton
- Production company: Stoll Pictures
- Distributed by: Stoll Pictures
- Release date: February 1921
- Country: United Kingdom
- Languages: Silent; English intertitles

My Lord Conceit is a 1921 British crime film directed by F. Martin Thornton and starring Evelyn Boucher, Maresco Marisini and Rowland Myles.

== Cast ==
- Evelyn Boucher as Beryl Foster
- Maresco Marisini as Count Savona
- Rowland Myles as Ivor Grant
- E.L. Frewyn as Sir Hector Grant
- Frank Petley as John Marsden
- J. Edwards Barker as Dr. Clark
- Emilie Nichol as Mrs. Grant
- Eric George as Cyril
- Thornton Edwards as Jackie
- Coomarie Gawthorne as Matabia

== Bibliography ==
- Goble, Alan. The Complete Index to Literary Sources in Film. Walter de Gruyter, 1999.
