= Power Over Men =

1929 film

- Directed by: George Banfield
- Written by: George Banfield; Denison Clift
- Produced by: George Banfield
- Starring: Isabel Jeans; Jameson Thomas; Wyndham Standing; Gibb McLaughlin
- Production company: British Filmcraft Productions
- Distributed by: Paramount British Pictures
- Release date: April 1929
- Running time: 6,918 feet
- Country: United Kingdom
- Languages: Sound (Synchronized); English Intertitles

Power Over Men is a 1929 British sound mystery film directed by George Banfield and starring Isabel Jeans, Jameson Thomas and Wyndham Standing. While the film has no audible dialog, it was released with a synchronized musical score with sound effects using both the sound-on-disc and sound-on-film process. It was made at Walthamstow Studios in London.

== Cast ==
- Isabel Jeans as Marion Delacour
- Jameson Thomas as Philippe Garnier
- Wyndham Standing as Émile Delacour
- Gibb McLaughlin as Alexandre Billot
- Jerrold Robertshaw as Fournier
- James Knight as Cesa
- Franklyn Bellamy as Bottomley
- Gabrielle Morton as Maid

== Music ==
The film featured a theme song entitled “That’s All Love Means to You” by Norton Greenop (music) and Pat K. Heale (words).

== Bibliography ==
- Low, Rachel. The History of British Film: Volume IV, 1918–1929. Routledge, 1997.
- Wood, Linda. British Films, 1927-1939. British Film Institute, 1986.
