= Belonging (1922 film) =

1922 British film by Floyd Martin Thornton

- Directed by: Floyd Martin Thornton
- Written by: Leslie Howard Gordon; Olive Wadsley (novel)
- Starring: Hugh Buckler; Barbara Hoffe; William Lenders
- Production company: Stoll Pictures
- Distributed by: Stoll Pictures
- Release date: March 1922
- Country: United Kingdom
- Languages: Silent; English intertitles

Belonging is a 1922 British silent crime film directed by Floyd Martin Thornton and starring Hugh Buckler, Barbara Hoffe and William Lenders. The film's direction is sometimes alternatively credited to George Ridgwell.

== Cast ==
- Hugh Buckler as Charles Carton
- Barbara Hoffe as Sara Lansdale
- William Lenders as Count Desanges
- Cecil Barry as Julian Guise
- George Garvey as Dominique Guise
- Leo Pinto as Anatole Colin
- Winifred Harris as Lady Diana

== Bibliography ==
- Goble, Alan. The Complete Index to Literary Sources in Film. Walter de Gruyter, 1999.
