= Evelyn Boucher =

British actress (1892–1991)

- Born: 15 March 1892; Steyning, West Sussex, England
- Died: 5 June 1991 (aged 99); Costa Mesa, California, U.S.
- Occupation: Film actor
- Years active: 1915–1923

Evelyn May Boucher (15 March 1892 – 5 June 1991) was a British film actress who had a number of leading roles in silent films during the 1910s and 1920s appearing in films such as Tom Brown's Schooldays and The Man Who Bought London made at Catford Studios. She frequently worked with her husband the director Floyd Martin Thornton.

She was born at Steyning in West Sussex in 1892, the daughter of Edward James Boucher (1850–1933) and Susannah née Parris (1855–1933). In 1915 she married the American writer and director Floyd Martin Thornton at Steyning. They had two sons, both born in England: Edward E. Martin (1916–2010) and Paul Mulford Martin (1921–1994). In 1925 she, her husband and her sons left the UK for America, where they all remained for the rest of their lives.

She died in 1991 aged 99 at Costa Mesa in Orange County, California.

== Selected filmography ==
- The Faith of a Child (1915)
- Tom Brown's Schooldays (1916)
- The Man Who Bought London (1916)
- Diana and Destiny (1916)
- If Thou Wert Blind (1917)
- The Happy Warrior (1917)
- Love's Old Sweet Song (1917)
- The Man Who Forgot (1919)
- The Knave of Hearts (1919)
- The Warrior Strain (1919)
- The Power of Right (1919)
- The Flame (1920)
- My Lord Conceit (1921)

== Bibliography ==
- Low, Rachel. The History of British Film: Volume IV, 1918–1929. Routledge, 1997.
- Warren, Patricia. British Film Studios: An Illustrated History. Batsford, 2001.
