= The Bishop's Emeralds =

1919 film by John B. O'Brien

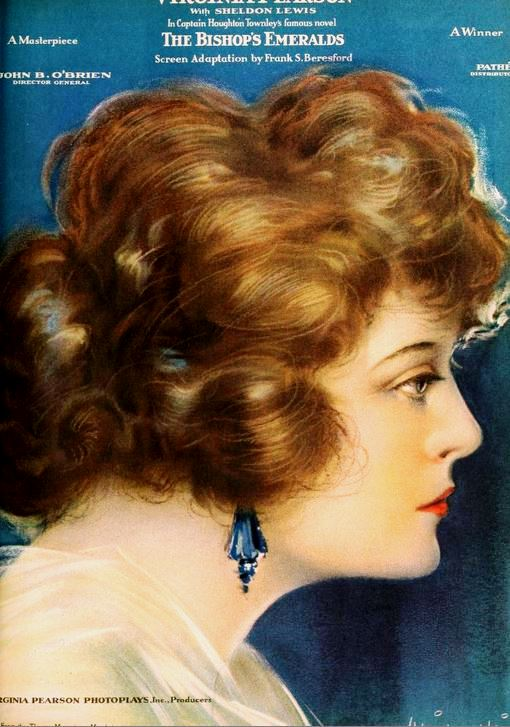
- advertisement
- Directed by: John B. O'Brien
- Based on: the novel, The Bishop's Emeralds, by Houghton Townley c.1908
- Produced by: Louis Meyer (aka Louis B. Mayer); Virginia Pearson Productions
- Starring: Virginia Pearson; Sheldon Lewis
- Cinematography: Lawrence Williams
- Distributed by: Pathé Exchange
- Release date: June 8, 1919
- Running time: 6 reels
- Country: USA
- Language: Silent...English titles

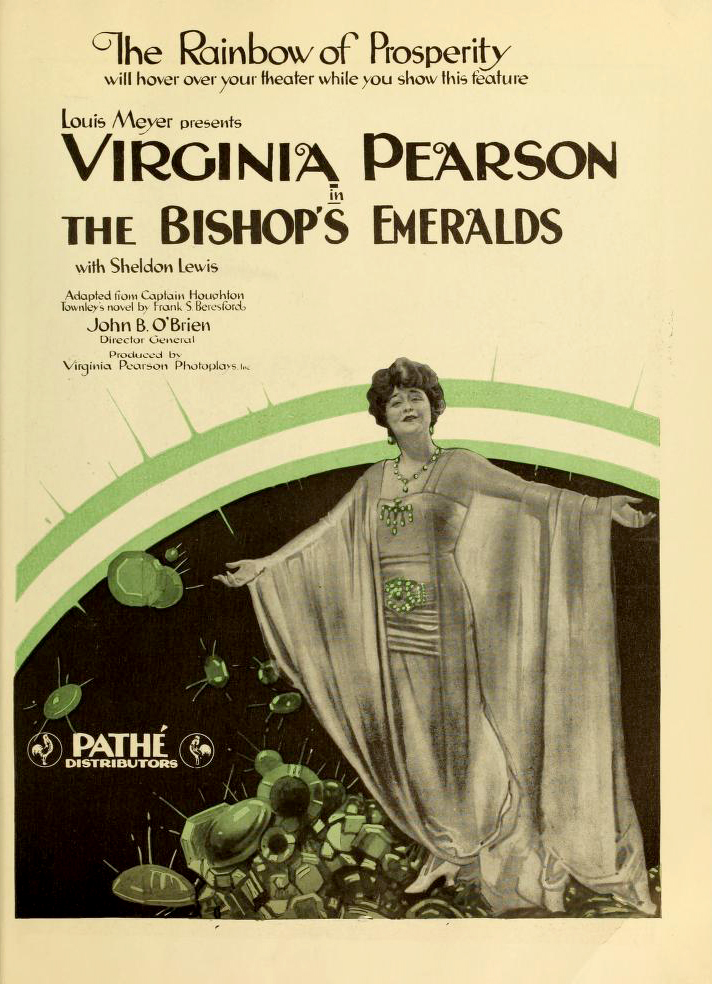
lobby poster

The Bishop's Emeralds is a lost 1919 silent film drama directed by John B. O'Brien and featuring Virginia Pearson and her real life spouse Sheldon Lewis. It was produced by Louis B. Mayer and released through Pathé Exchange.

== Cast ==
- Virginia Pearson – Hester, Lady Cardew
- Sheldon Lewis
- Robert Broderick – Lord John Cardew, Bishop of Ripley
- Frank Kingsley – Jack Cardew, his son
- Lucy Fox – Mabel Bannister
- Marcia Harris – Caroline Cardew
- Walter Newman – Voss, Bannister's valet
- Sheldon Lewis – Richard Bannister
