= The Great Impostor (1918 film) =

- Directed by: F. Martin Thornton
- Written by: Reuben Gillmer
- Starring: Marie Blanche; Bernard Dudley; Edward O'Neill
- Production company: Harma Photoplays
- Distributed by: Harma Photoplays
- Release date: May 1918
- Country: United Kingdom
- Languages: Silent; English intertitles

The Great Impostor is a 1918 British silent drama film directed by F. Martin Thornton and starring Marie Blanche, Bernard Dudley and Edward O'Neill. The story features a man posing as a gentleman's lost heir so he can be with the gentleman's daughter.

== Cast ==
- Marie Blanche as Enid Linden
- Bernard Dudley as Roger Garnett
- Edward O'Neill as Lord Sellington
- Lionel d'Aragon as Dolan
- Harry Lorraine as Hixton
- Rupert Stutfield
- James Prior
- Cecil Stokes
- Gladys Foyle

== Bibliography ==
- Low, Rachael. The History of the British Film 1914-1918. Routledge, 2005.
