= The Silver Greyhound (1919 film) =

- Directed by: Bannister Merwin
- Written by: Bannister Merwin
- Produced by: Harry Maze Jenks
- Starring: James Knight; Marjorie Villis; Mary Dibley
- Production company: Harma Photoplays
- Distributed by: Harma Photoplays
- Release date: January 1919
- Country: United Kingdom
- Languages: Silent; English intertitles

The Silver Greyhound is a 1919 British silent film directed by Bannister Merwin and starring James Knight, Marjorie Villis and Mary Dibley.

== Cast ==
- James Knight as John Vane
- Marjorie Villis as Nancy Lisle
- Mary Dibley as Lady Chalmore
- Frank Petley as The Master
- Jeff Barlow
- Clifford Pembroke
- Charles Ashley as Lord Chalmore
- Dallas Cairns
- Hamilton Stewart
- Frank Gerrard

== Bibliography ==
- Low, Rachael. The History of British Film The History of the British Film 1914 - 1918. Routledge, 2013.
