= George Banfield =

British film producer and director

- Born: 7 December 1888; Hackney, England
- Died: 10 June 1963 (aged 74); Nice, France
- Other name: George J. Banfield
- Occupations: Film director, film producer
- Years active: 1908–29

George Banfield (1888–1963) was a British film producer and director. He first entered the film industry in 1908. During the mid-1920s he began producing series of short films during the Slump of 1924. In 1926 he formed a new company British Filmcraft, and bought Walthamstow Studios. The company produced a large number of shorts, and four feature films but did not make the transition from silent to sound films. He is sometimes credited as George J. Banfield.

He made films for British Filmcraft

== Selected filmography ==
=== Director ===
- David Garrick (1928)
- Spangles (1928)
- Power Over Men (1929)
- The Burgomaster of Stilemonde (1929)

== Bibliography ==
- Low, Rachel. The History of British Film: Volume IV, 1918–1929. Routledge, 1997.
