= Spangles (1928 film) =

1928 film

- Directed by: George Banfield
- Written by: Fred Raynham
- Starring: Fern Andra; Forrester Harvey; Lewis Dayton; James Knight
- Cinematography: Phil Ross
- Production company: British Filmcraft Productions
- Distributed by: Paramount British Pictures
- Release date: December 1928
- Running time: 7,425 feet
- Country: United Kingdom
- Languages: Silent; English intertitles

Spangles is a 1928 British silent drama film directed by George Banfield and starring Fern Andra, Forrester Harvey and Lewis Dayton. It was made at Walthamstow Studios by British Filmcraft. A circus girl goes to London and enjoys great success. However, she eventually decides to return home.

== Cast ==
- Fern Andra as Spangles
- Forrester Harvey as Watty
- Lewis Dayton as Hugh Gridstone
- A. Bromley Davenport as Romanovitch
- James Knight as Haggerston
- A.B. Imeson as Earl of Warborough
- Gladys Frazin as Countess
- Carlton Chase as Dennis Adderly

== Bibliography ==
- Low, Rachel. The History of British Film: Volume IV, 1918–1929. Routledge, 1997.
- Wood, Linda. British Films, 1927-1939. British Film Institute, 1986.
