= King Charles (film) =

- Directed by: Wilfred Noy
- Written by: Harrison Ainsworth (novel); Low Warren
- Starring: P.G. Ebbutt; Dorothy Bellew
- Production company: Clarendon Films
- Distributed by: Clarendon Films
- Release date: September 1913
- Country: United Kingdom
- Languages: Silent; English intertitles

King Charles is a 1913 British silent historical film directed by Wilfred Noy and starring P.G. Ebbutt and Dorothy Bellew. The film is based on Harrison Ainsworth's 1857 novel Ovingdean Grange. Following his army's defeat at the Battle of Worcester, Charles II manages to escape to Continental Europe.

== Cast ==
- P.G. Ebbutt as King Charles II
- Dorothy Bellew as Dulcia Beard

== Bibliography ==
- Low, Rachael. The History of British Film, Volume III: 1914-1918. Routledge, 1997.
