= Melody of Death =

1922 film

- Directed by: Floyd Martin Thornton
- Written by: Leslie Howard Gordon
- Based on: The Melody of Death by Edgar Wallace
- Starring: Philip Anthony; Enid R. Reed; Dick Sutherd
- Production company: Stoll Pictures
- Distributed by: Stoll Pictures
- Release date: June 1922
- Country: United Kingdom
- Languages: Silent; English intertitles

Melody of Death is a 1922 British silent crime film directed by Floyd Martin Thornton and starring Philip Anthony, Enid R. Reed and Dick Sutherd. It is an adaptation of the 1915 novel The Melody of Death by Edgar Wallace.

== Cast ==
- Philip Anthony as Gilbert Standerton
- Enid R. Reed as Enid Cathcart
- Dick Sutherd as George Wallis
- H. Agar Lyons as Sir John Standerton
- Frank Petley
- Hetta Bartlett as Mrs Cathcart
- Bob Vallis

== Bibliography ==
- Goble, Alan. The Complete Index to Literary Sources in Film. Walter de Gruyter, 1999.
- Low, Rachael. The History of the British Film 1918-1929. George Allen & Unwin, 1971.
