= The Man Who Bought London (film) =

1916 film

- Directed by: Floyd Martin Thornton
- Based on: The Man Who Bought London by Edgar Wallace
- Produced by: Guido Serra
- Starring: E.J. Arundel; Evelyn Boucher; Roy Travers; Reginald Fox
- Production company: Windsor Films
- Distributed by: Int-Ex
- Release date: January 1916
- Country: United Kingdom
- Languages: Silent; English intertitles

The Man Who Bought London is a 1916 British silent crime film directed by Floyd Martin Thornton and starring E.J. Arundel, Evelyn Boucher and Roy Travers. It was based on the 1915 novel The Man Who Bought London by Edgar Wallace. It was the first of many Wallace stories to be adapted into films. It was made at Catford Studios.

== Cast ==
- E.J. Arundel as King Kerry
- Evelyn Boucher as Elsie Marion
- Roy Travers as Hermon Zeberlieff
- Nina Leonise as Vera Zeberlieff
- Reginald Fox as Gordon Bray
- Rolf Leslie as Horace Baggins
- Jeff Barlow as James Leete
- Harold Saxon-Snell as Micheloff
- J. Gunnis Davis as Tack
- A.G. Gardner as Gillette
- Helen Stewart as Mrs. Gritter

== Bibliography ==
- Bergfelder, Tim. International Adventures: German Popular Cinema and European Co-Productions in the 1960s. Berghahn Books, 2005.
- Warren, Patricia. British Film Studios: An Illustrated History. Batsford, 2001.
