= Frailty (1921 film) =

1921 film

- Directed by: Floyd Martin Thornton
- Written by: Olive Wadsley (novel); Leslie Howard Gordon
- Production company: Stoll Pictures
- Distributed by: Stoll Pictures
- Release date: July 1921
- Country: United Kingdom
- Languages: Silent; English intertitles

Frailty is a 1921 British silent drama film directed by F. Martin Thornton and starring Madge Stuart, Rowland Myles and Sydney Lewis Ransome.

== Cast ==
- Madge Stuart as Diana
- Rowland Myles as Charles Ley
- Sydney Lewis Ransome as Beverly Dacre
- Paulette del Baye as Felice Ley
- H. Agar Lyons as Harman
- J. Edwards Barker as Partner
- Mrs. Gerald as Marie Ley

== Bibliography ==
- Goble, Alan (1999). The complete index to literary sources in film. London: Bowker-Saur. ISBN 978-3-11-095194-3 – via Internet Archive.
