= The Verdict of the Heart =

- Directed by: Wilfred Noy
- Production company: Clarendon
- Distributed by: Moss Films
- Release date: August 1915
- Country: United Kingdom
- Languages: Silent; English intertitles

The Verdict of the Heart is a 1915 British silent film directed by Wilfred Noy.

== Cast ==
- Barbara Conrad
- Frank Royde
- Harry Welchman

== Bibliography ==
- Low, Rachael. History of the British Film, 1914-1918. Routledge, 2005.
