= How Kitchener Was Betrayed =

1921 film

- Directed by: Percy Nash
- Written by: Norman Ramsay
- Starring: Fred Paul; Winifred Evans; Bertram Burleigh
- Production company: Screen Plays
- Distributed by: British Exhibitors' Films
- Release date: November 1922
- Country: United Kingdom
- Language: English

How Kitchener Was Betrayed is a 1921 British silent war film directed by Percy Nash and starring Fred Paul, Winifred Evans, and Bertram Burleigh. It was a fictional portrayal of the events leading up to the death of Herbert Kitchener on HMS Hampshire during the First World War, in which the German secret service received warning of the general's activities through a German agent Elbie Böcker. The film was intended to cash in on the controversy raised by the publication of a biography of Kitchener in 1920 challenging the Admiralty's official conclusion that the ship was sunk by a mine. Only one of its six reels survives.

== Controversy ==
The film's plot raised objections from a number of figures on the grounds of historical inaccuracy and it was refused a licence by the London County Council (LCC) authorities, effectively barring its distribution throughout Britain. Pressure was also successfully exerted on William Hays of the Motion Picture Association of America to ban the film in the United States and the French authorities also refused to screen it. The film's delayed premiere took place at Leicester Square in November 1922, and the LCC immediately took legal action against the cinema owner, who conceded the case. No further attempts were made to release the film. This put in place an effective ban on controversial contemporary history films until the release of Herbert Wilcox's Dawn in 1928.

== Cast ==
- Fred Paul - Field Marshal Kitchener
- Winifred Evans - Elbie Böcker
- Bertram Burleigh - Lieutenant Mack
- Peggy Hathaway - Mrs. Mack
- Ion Swinley - The Spy
- Wallace Bosco
- Frank Goldsmith

== See also ==
- Fräulein Doktor (1969)

== Bibliography ==
- Robertson, James Crighton. The Hidden Cinema: British Film Censorship in Action, 1913-1975. Routledge, 1993.
