= Ye Wooing of Peggy =

1917 silent short film

Ye Wooing of Peggy is a 1917 British silent romantic comedy film directed by Bertram Phillips and starring Queenie Thomas, Jack Grey and Frank Petley.

== Cast ==
- Queenie Thomas as Peggy
- Jack Grey as Noel
- Frank Petley as Sir John
- Edgar Lyons
