= The Lost Chord (1925 film) =

1925 film

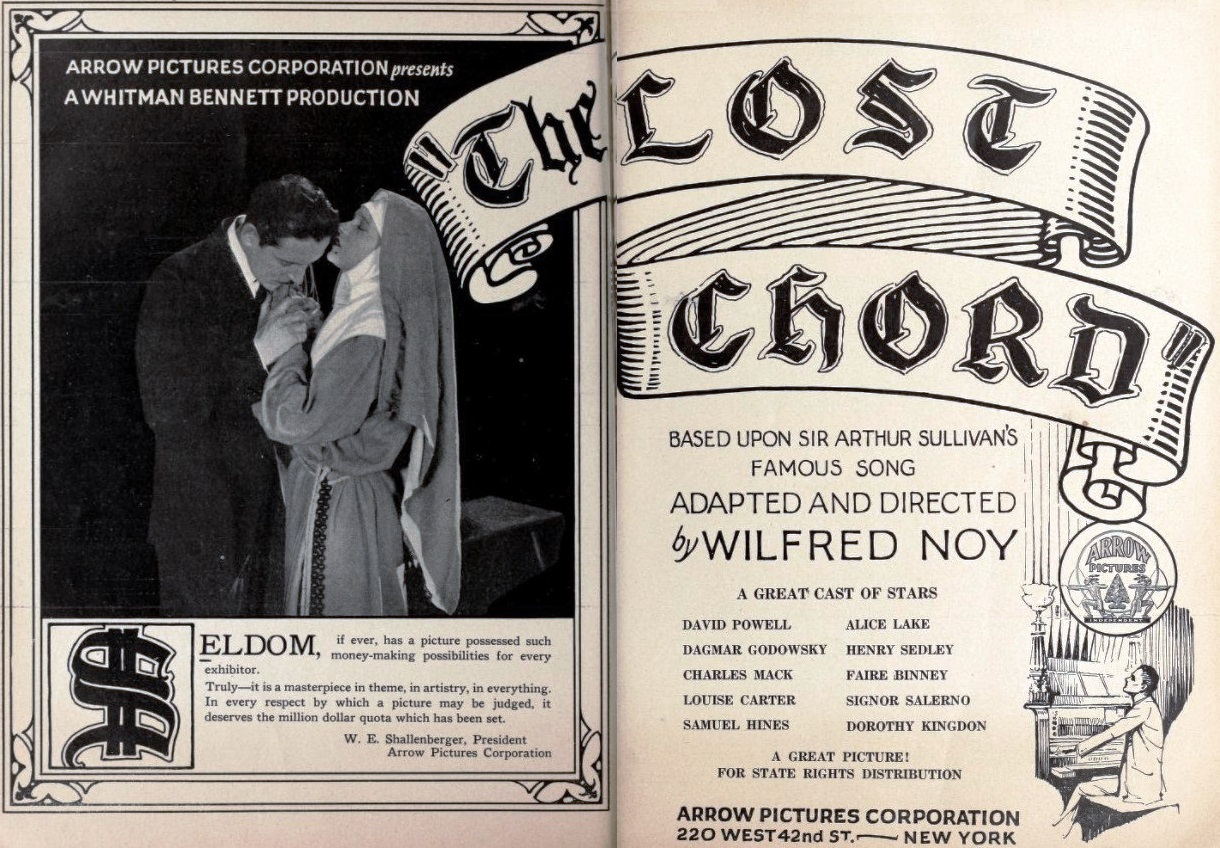
- Advertisement
- Directed by: Wilfred Noy
- Written by: Wilfred Noy
- Based on: "The Lost Chord" by Arthur Sullivan
- Starring: David Powell; Alice Lake; Dagmar Godowsky
- Production company: Chord Pictures
- Distributed by: Arrow Film Corporation
- Release date: January 15, 1925
- Running time: 7 reels
- Country: United States
- Language: Silent (English intertitles)

The Lost Chord is a 1925 American silent drama film directed by Wilfred Noy and starring David Powell, Alice Lake, and Dagmar Godowsky. It is based on Arthur Sullivan's 1877 song "The Lost Chord." Noy had previously made the film in Great Britain in 1917 and this remake marked his American debut.

== Plot ==
As described in a review in a film magazine, Arnold Grahme, celebrated organist, returning from abroad finds that his sweetheart, Madeline, has married Count Zara, who treats her brutally and has an affair with his "cousin," Pauline. Zara, jealous of Arnold, provokes a quarrel and in a duel fought later in Italy is killed by Arnold. Pauline in the meantime has persuaded Zara to kidnap his little daughter, Pauline. Madeline goes to a convent, Arnold tries to persuade her to marry him, and finally, speaking to her through his music, she agrees, but falls dead. Arnold’s nephew, Jack, quarrels with his chorus girl sweetheart Joan and goes away. Arnold becomes interested in this girl because of her beautiful voice, falls in love with her and discovers she is Madeline's child. He proposes and is accepted, but the return of Jack reveals the fact that the young couple are in love with each other. Arnold sacrifices his own love that they may be happy, and while seeking solace at the organ the spirit of Madeline tells him "The Lost Chord" is the song of sacrifice the angels sing.

== Cast ==
- David Powell as Arnold Grahme
- Alice Lake as Madeline, Countess Zara
- Dagmar Godowsky as Pauline Zara
- Henry Sedley as Count Zara
- Faire Binney as Joan
- Louise Carter as Phyllis
- Charles W. Mack as Jack Brown (credited as Charles Mack)
- Dorothy Kingdon as Helene Brown
- Samuel E. Hines as Arthur Ames (credited as Samuel Hines)
- Signor N. Salerno as Levina
- Rita Maurice as Baby Joan

== Preservation ==
With no prints of The Lost Chord located in any film archives, it is a lost film.

== Bibliography ==
- Munden, Kenneth White. The American Film Institute Catalog of Motion Pictures Produced in the United States, Part 1. University of California Press, 1997.
