= The Education of Nicky =

1921 film

- Release date: 1921
- Country: United Kingdom
- Language: Silent

The Education of Nicky is a 1921 British silent romance film directed by Arthur Rooke and starring James Knight, Marjorie Villis and Constance Worth. It was based on a novel by May Wynn.

== Cast ==
- James Knight ... Nicky Malvesty
- Marjorie Villis ... Trixie Happinleigh
- Constance Worth ... Chloe
- Mary Rorke ... Lady Aberleigh
- Keith Weatherley ... Colonel Trouville
- Dolores Courtenay ... Virginia
- George Williams ... Mr. Malvesty
- Winifred Sadler ... Mrs. Malvesty
