= A Smart Set =

1919 film

A Smart Set is a 1919 British silent crime film directed by A. V. Bramble and starring Concordia Merrill, Arthur M. Cullin and Judd Green.

== Plot ==
A detective poses as an opium fiend to save an addicted knight and his daughter from abduction by a jeweler.

== Cast ==
- Concordia Merrel — Pauline
- Arthur M. Cullin — Sir Philip Trevor
- Neville Percy — Neville Temple
- Judd Green — Parson
- S. J. Warmington — Herbert Sterne
- Doriel Paget — Fay Trevor
- Gwen Williams
- Iris Mackie
- Gordon McLeod
- Rex Harold
