= The Heroine of Mons =

- Directed by: Wilfred Noy
- Starring: Dorothy Bellew; Leslie Howard; Bert Wynne
- Production company: Clarendon Films
- Distributed by: Gaumont British Distributors
- Release date: October 1914
- Country: United Kingdom
- Languages: Silent; English intertitles

The Heroine of Mons is a 1914 British silent war film directed by Wilfred Noy (the maternal uncle of Leslie Howard) and starring Dorothy Bellew, Leslie Howard and Bert Wynne. The film marked the screen debut of Howard, who went on to be leading star of British and Hollywood cinema. The film was made during the opening weeks of the First World War, and refers to the Battle of Mons.

== Cast ==
- Dorothy Bellew as The Girl
- Leslie Howard
- Bert Wynne

== Bibliography ==
- Cochrane, Claire. Twentieth-Century British Theatre: Industry, Art and Empire. Cambridge University Press, 2011.
