= Houghton Townley =

British writer

Captain Houghton Townley was a writer. He authored The Gay Lord Waring, The Bishop's Emeralds and The Splendid Coward which were adapted to film. F. McGrew Willis wrote the film adaptation of his novel The Gay Lord Waring.

The Bishop's Emeralds was a drama featuring English society life.

Townley served in the British Army.

== Bibliography ==
- Secret of the Raft
- A Minion
- His Own Accuser
- The Bishop's Emeralds (1908), W. J. Watt & Co., illustrated by Will Grefe
- The Scarlet Feather (1909)
- English Woodlands and Their Story (1910)
- The Gay Lord Waring (1910)

== Filmography ==
- The Gay Lord Waring (1916)
- The Splendid Coward (1918)
- The Bishop's Emeralds (1919)
