= The Shadow of Evil =

1921 film

- Directed by: George A. Cooper; James Reardon
- Written by: Carlton Dawe (novel); Harry Hughes
- Starring: Mary Dibley; Reginald Fox; Cecil Humphreys
- Production company: British Art
- Distributed by: Regent
- Release date: May 1921
- Country: United Kingdom
- Languages: Silent; English intertitles

The Shadow of Evil is a 1921 British silent crime film directed by George A. Cooper and James Reardon and starring Mary Dibley, Reginald Fox and Cecil Humphreys.

== Cast ==
- Mary Dibley
- Reginald Fox
- Cecil Humphreys
- Gladys Mason

== Bibliography ==
- Murphy, Robert. Directors in British and Irish Cinema: A Reference Companion. British Film Institute, 2006.
