= Roy Byford =

British actor (1873–1939)

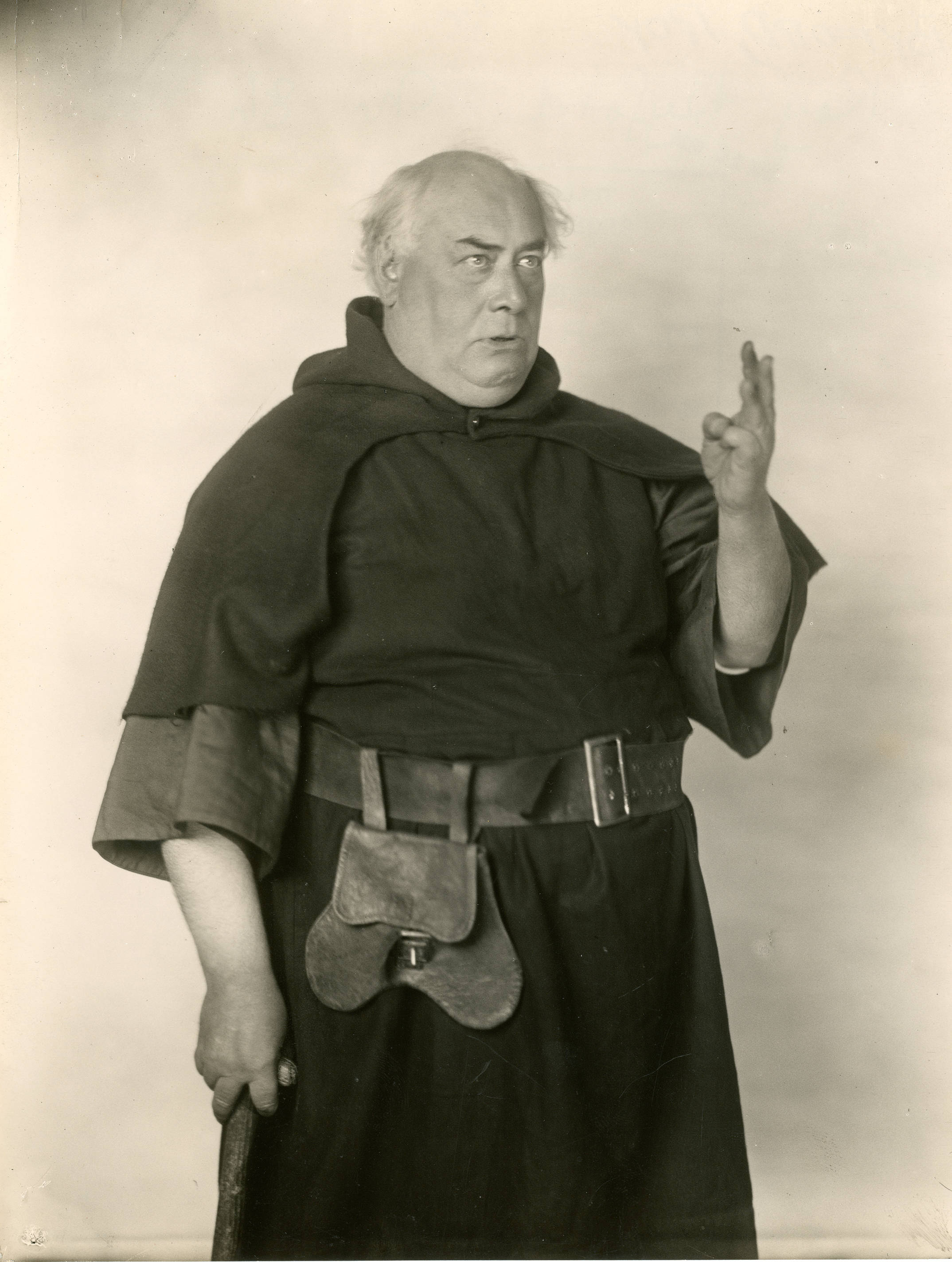
- Born: 12 January 1873; London, England
- Died: 31 January 1939 (aged 66); London, England
- Burial place: Margravine Cemetery
- Occupation: Actor

Roy Byford (12 January 1873 – 31 January 1939) was a British actor.

== Biography ==
Roy Byford was born in London 12 January 1873.

He died at Hammersmith Hospital in London on 31 January 1939.

== Selected filmography ==
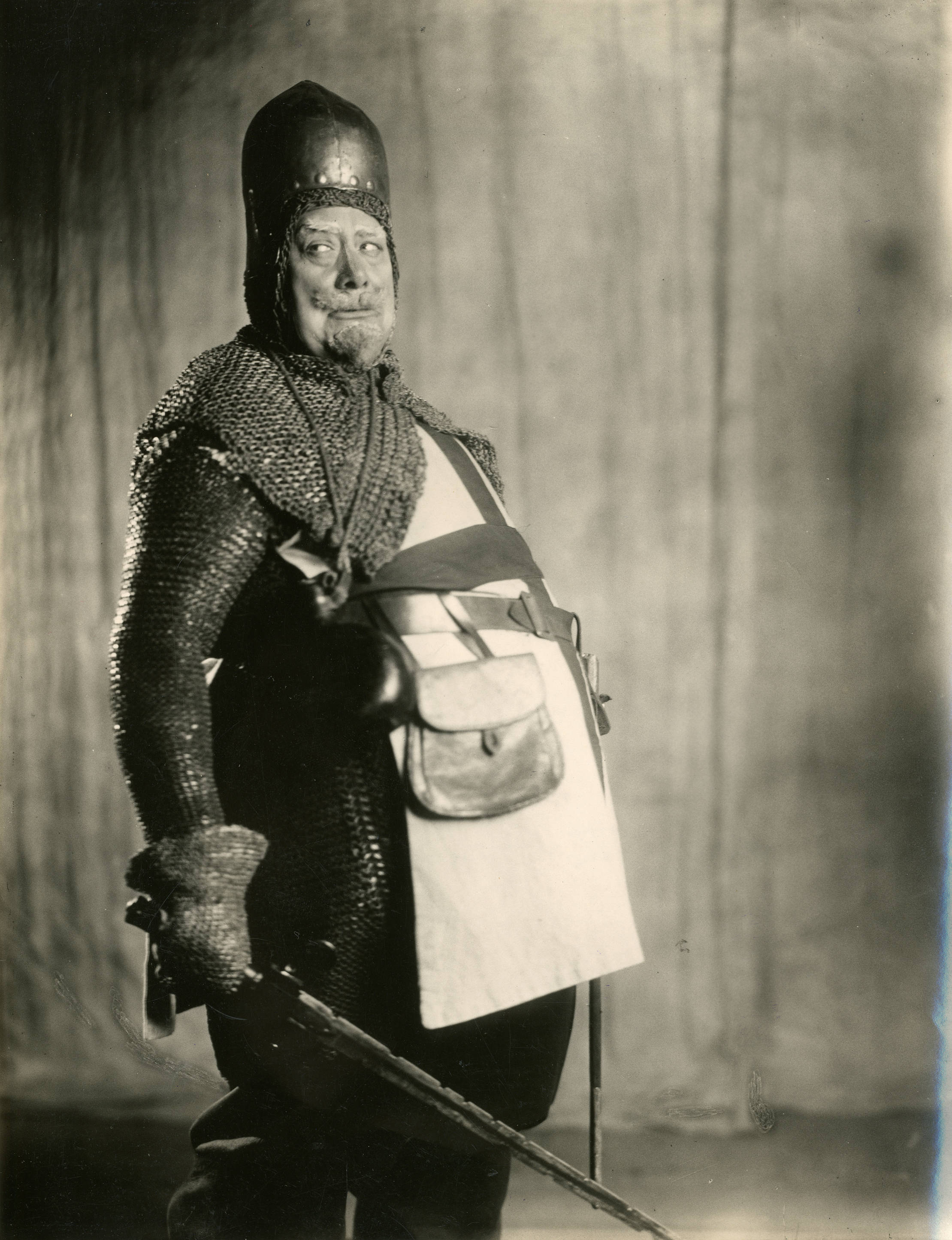
As Falstaff in 1929

- The Little Damozel (1916)
- On the Banks of Allan Water (1916)
- The Happy Warrior (1917)
- The Twelve Pound Look (1920)
- The Double Event (1921)
- The Night Hawk (1921)
- Love's Boomerang (1922)
- The Spanish Jade (1922)
- A Master of Craft (1922)
- Tons of Money (1924)
- Immortal Gentleman (1935)
- Museum Mystery (1937)
