= Winifred Evans =

British actress (1890–?)

Winifred Evans (born 4 July 1890, London) was a British actress. In 1921 she appeared as a Germany spy in the controversial film How Kitchener Was Betrayed which was ultimately banned.

== Selected filmography ==
- The Happy Warrior (1917)
- The Splendid Coward (1918)
- The Lady Clare (1919)
- How Kitchener Was Betrayed (1921)
- Greatheart (1921)
- Cupid in Clover (1929)
- Three Men in a Boat (1933)

== Bibliography ==
- Robertson, James Crighton. The hidden cinema: British film censorship in action, 1913-1975. Routledge, 1993.
