= A Romany Lass =

- Directed by: F. Martin Thornton
- Written by: Reuben Gillmer
- Starring: James Knight; Marjorie Villis; Bernard Dudley
- Production company: Harma Photoplays
- Distributed by: Harma Photoplays
- Release date: August 1918
- Country: United Kingdom
- Languages: Silent; English intertitles

A Romany Lass is a 1918 British silent drama film directed by F. Martin Thornton and starring James Knight, Marjorie Villis and Bernard Dudley. It included "gipsy" scenery and Marjorie Villis as a "gipsy".

== Cast ==
- James Knight as Donald MacLean
- Marjorie Villis as Rilka
- Bernard Dudley as Wolf
- Charles Rock as Colonel MacLean
- Arthur M. Cullin as Dr. Harris
- F.G. Thurstans as Reverend Angus MacTavish
- Adeline Hayden Coffin
- James Reardon

== Bibliography ==
- Low, Rachael. The History of the British Film 1914-1918. Routledge, 2005.
