= Dorothy Bellew =

English actress (1891–1973)

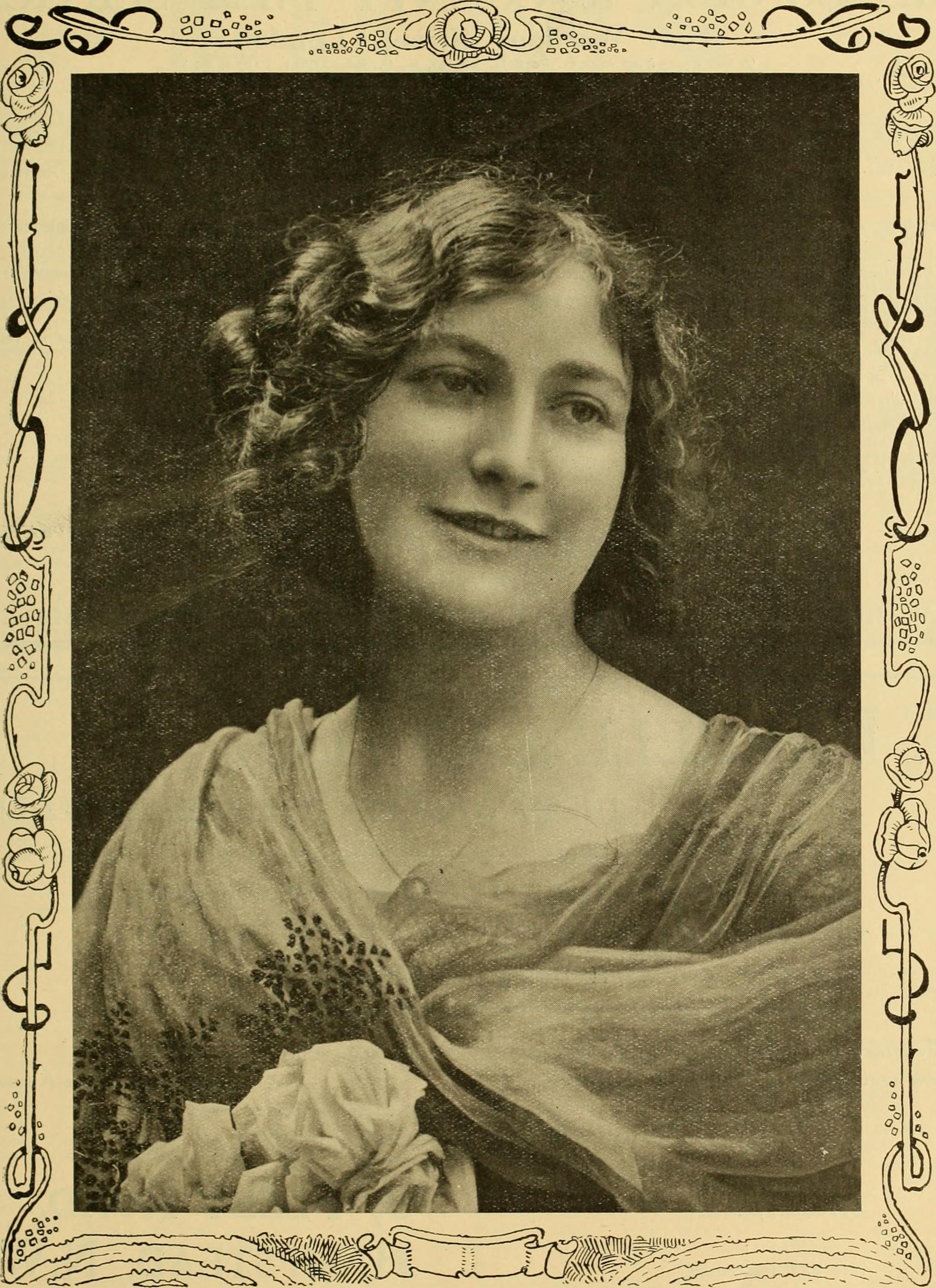
- Bellew in 1912
- Born: Dorothy Falck; 8 August 1891; Hampstead, London, England, United Kingdom of Great Britain and Ireland
- Died: 29 October 1973 (aged 82); Patcham, Brighton, Sussex, England, United Kingdom
- Occupation: Actress
- Years active: 1910–1918 (film)

Dorothy Bellew (8 August 1891 – 29 October 1973) was an English actress. She appeared in around sixty films during the silent era, including the title role in Lorna Doone (1912).

== Selected filmography ==
Year	Title
1912	Lorna Doone
1913	King Charles
1914	The Heroine of Mons
1915	The Master of Merripit
1915	Hard Times
1916	Disraeli
1917	The Profligate
1917	The Lost Chord
1918	A Master of Men

== Bibliography ==
- Klossner, Michael. The Europe of 1500-1815 on Film and Television: A Worldwide Filmography of Over 2550 Works, 1895 Through 2000. McFarland & Company, 2002.
