= The Burgomaster of Stilemonde =

1929 British film by George Banfield

- Directed by: George Banfield
- Written by: Maurice Maeterlinck (play)
- Starring: John Martin Harvey; Fern Andra; Robert Andrews; John F. Hamilton
- Production company: British Filmcraft
- Distributed by: Woolf & Freedman Film Service
- Release dates: January 1929 (Trade Show); 20 May 1929 (General)
- Country: United Kingdom
- Languages: Sound (Synchronzied); English Intertitles
- Budget: £20,000

The Burgomaster of Stilemonde is a 1929 British sound drama film. While the film has no audible dialog, it was released with a synchronized musical score with sound effects using both the sound-on-disc and sound-on-film process. The film was directed by George Banfield and starring John Martin Harvey, Fern Andra and Robert Andrews. It was made at Walthamstow Studios and on location in Belgium. It was based on the 1918 play Le Bourgmestre de Stilmonde by Maurice Maeterlinck. Like the play, it portrays German atrocities during the First World War occupation of Belgium. It was well received by critics.

== Cast ==
- John Martin Harvey as Cyrille van Belle (The Burgomaster)
- Fern Andra as Isabelle Hilmer
- Robert Andrews as Lt. Otto Hilmer
- John F. Hamilton as Odilion van Belle
- Fred Raynham as Baron von Rochow
- Wilfred Shine as Claus
- A. B. Imeson as Capt. Karl von Shernberg
- Oswald Lingard as Father de Coninck
- Kinsey Peile as Sheriff Vermandel
- Mickey Brantford as Flores
- Adeline Hayden Coffin
- C. V. France

== Music ==
The film featured a theme song entitled "As The Sun Goes Down" which was composed by Pat Heale and Fred Elizalde.

== Bibliography ==
- Low, Rachael (1971). History of the British Film, 1918–1929. George Allen & Unwin.
