= A Princess of the Blood =

- Directed by: Wilfred Noy
- Production company: Clarendon
- Distributed by: Clarendon
- Release date: January 1916
- Country: United Kingdom
- Languages: Silent; English intertitles

A Princess of the Blood is a 1916 British silent film directed by Wilfred Noy.

== Cast ==
- Barbara Conrad
- Harry Welchman

== Bibliography ==
- Denis Gifford. The Illustrated Who's Who in British Films. B.T. Batsford, 1978.
