= No. 7 Brick Row =

1922 film

- Directed by: Fred W. Durrant
- Written by: Willie Riley (novel)
- Starring: Constance Worth; Marjorie Villis; James Knight
- Production company: Harma-Associated Exhibitors
- Distributed by: Walturdaw
- Release date: July 1922
- Country: United Kingdom
- Languages: Silent; English intertitles

No. 7 Brick Row is a 1922 British silent crime film directed by Fred W. Durrant and starring Constance Worth, Marjorie Villis and James Knight.

== Cast ==
- Constance Worth as Daisy Knox
- Marjorie Villis as Gertie Mellor
- James Knight as Dr. James Peacock
- Bernard Dudley as Bertram Lycester
- H. Tyrrell-Davis as Sam Mundy
- Marguerite Leigh as Mrs. Tickle
- George A. Williams as Caleb Knox
- Johnny Butt as Sooty Bill
- Sydney Lewis Ransome as Sergeant Smith
- Edith Morley as Maud Annie Tickle
- Marie d'Andara as Cissie Tickle
- Greta Wood as Louisa

== Bibliography ==
- Low, Rachael. History of the British Film, 1918-1929. George Allen & Unwin, 1971.
