= On the Banks of Allan Water =

1916 British film by Wilfred Noy

- Directed by: Wilfred Noy
- Written by: Reuben Gillmer
- Production company: Clarendon
- Distributed by: Lucoque
- Release date: December 1916
- Country: United Kingdom
- Languages: Silent; English intertitles

On the Banks of Allan Water is a 1916 British silent film directed by Wilfred Noy.

== Cast ==
- Basil Gill as Richard Warden
- J. Hastings Batson as Sir John Warden
- Roy Byford as David Graeme
- F.G. Clifton as James Hart
- Violet Graham as Elsie Graeme
- Grania Gray as Lady Ida Barrington

== Bibliography ==
- Low, Rachael. History of the British Film, 1914-1918. Routledge, 2005.
