= Harry Welchman =

Musical theatre and film actor (1886–1966)

Welchman in Sybil, 1921–22

Harry Welchman (24 February 1886 – 3 January 1966) was an English star of musical theatre. He made several appearances in non-musical plays, but was remembered as, in the words of The Times, "perhaps the most popular musical comedy hero on the London stage in the years between the wars."

Welchman was primarily a stage performer, but he made nineteen films between 1915 and 1954, some of them musical and others straight drama.

== Early life and career ==
Welchman was born at Barnstaple, Devon, the son of an Army colonel. He was educated at Weston-super-Mare, Somerset, where he was a sporting boy, playing, as he said, "all the games", including hockey at county level. On leaving school at the age of eighteen he joined a touring musical comedy company led by Ada Reeve. When he was twenty he was spotted while playing in Christmas pantomime by the impresario Robert Courtneidge, under whose management he became a well known juvenile lead in such West End hit shows as Tom Jones (1907) The Arcadians (1909) and Princess Caprice (1912). In 1915 he made his first film, in the title role of Mr. Lyndon at Liberty.

Welchman with Phyllis Dare in The Lady of the Rose (1922)

During the latter part of the First World War Welchman served in the Royal Artillery. After demobilisation he returned to the West End under the management of C B Cochran, appearing with Alice Delysia in Afgar (1919). In 1921 he went to Daly's Theatre where he had two substantial successes, Sybil, and The Lady of the Rose, which, as The Times put it, "contained a famous duet in which Welchman tried without success to storm the affections of the heroine, played by Miss Phyllis Dare."

== Operetta, film and later years ==
In 1925 Welchman made his Broadway debut as Rudolph Rassendyll in Princess Flavia. In the same year he appeared in London under his own management at the Adelphi Theatre in Love's Prisoner (1925). The piece, judged by The Times to be an unsuccessful mixture of Gilbert and Sullivan, melodrama and musical comedy, had a brief run. He had a greater success in a string of West End operetta-style musical hits, playing leading man roles. These included the Red Shadow in The Desert Song (1927), which ran at Drury Lane for more than 400 performances; in The New Moon (1929) at the same theatre; in Victoria and Her Hussar (1931); and as François Villon in a revival of The Vagabond King (1937). He toured as Captain Hook in Peter Pan, in which The Manchester Guardian found him less villainous than his predecessors in the role, but "melodious" with "a certain dash and attractiveness".

In the 1930s and 40s Welchman appeared in more than a dozen feature films, some musical and others straight drama. Among the former were A Southern Maid (1933) and Lisbon Story (1946); the latter include The Gentle Sex and The Life and Death of Colonel Blimp (1943).

In 1947 Welchman moved to Penzance, where he bought a farm and spent more and more of his time, though never formally retiring from the stage. In 1959, when he was seventy-three, he played Lord Mortlake in John Osborne's The World of Paul Slickey; he and Marie Löhr, who played his wife, were singled out for praise as highlights of an otherwise dull evening. He was the subject of This Is Your Life on 8 February 1960.

Welchman was twice married. His first marriage, to Joan Challoner, was dissolved. His second wife was the actress Sylvia Forde, with whom he had a daughter. He died in Penzance at the age of seventy-nine.

== Partial filmography ==
- The Verdict of the Heart (1915)
- The Lyons Mail (1916)
- A Princess of the Blood (1916)
- The Maid of the Mountains (1932)
- A Southern Maid (1933)
- The Last Waltz (1936)
- The Common Touch (1941)
- This Was Paris (1942)
- The Gentle Sex (1943)
- The Life and Death of Colonel Blimp (1943)
- Waltz Time (1945)
- Lisbon Story (1946)
- Loyal Heart (1946)
- I'll Turn to You (1946)
- Green Fingers (1947)
- Judgment Deferred (1952)
- Eight O'Clock Walk (1954)
- Mad About Men (1954)
- Three Cases of Murder (1955)
