= The Lost Chord (1917 film) =

- Directed by: Wilfred Noy
- Written by: Reuben Gillmer
- Starring: Barbara Conrad; Malcolm Keen; Dorothy Bellew
- Production company: Clarendon Films
- Distributed by: Clarendon Films
- Release date: January 1917
- Country: United Kingdom
- Languages: Silent; English intertitles

The Lost Chord is a 1917 British silent drama film directed by Wilfred Noy and starring Barbara Conrad, Malcolm Keen and Dorothy Bellew. It was inspired by Arthur Sullivan's 1877 song "The Lost Chord". In 1925 when Noy moved to the United States, he remade the film as his American debut.

== Cast ==
- Barbara Conrad as Madeleine
- Malcolm Keen as David
- Concordia Merrel as Joan
- Dorothy Bellew
- Mary Ford
- H. Manning Haynes

== Bibliography ==
- Low, Rachael. The History of the British Film 1918-1929. George Allen & Unwin, 1971.
