= Tom Brown's Schooldays (1916 film) =

1916 film by Rex Wilson

Tom Brown's Schooldays is a 1916 British silent drama film directed by Rex Wilson and starring Joyce Templeton, Jack Coleman and Evelyn Boucher. It is an adaptation of the 1857 novel Tom Brown's School Days by Thomas Hughes. It is set at Rugby School in the 1830s where Tom Brown encounters the villainous bully Flashman. It was made at Catford Studios.

== Cast ==
- Joyce Templeton as First Tom Brown
- Jack Coleman as Second Tom Brown
- Jack Hobbs as Third Tom Brown
- Miss Marley as Mrs. Arnold
- Evelyn Boucher as Cynthia Brown
- Wilfred Benson as Doctor Arnold
- Mr. Daniels as Squire Brown
- Mr. Johnson as Harry East
- Laurie Leslie as Flashman
- E.C. Arundell as Wheelwright
- Mona Damt as Dame Brown
- Eric Barker as Arthur
- Rolf Leslie as Jacob Doodlecalf
- H. Dobell as Benjy
- Mr. Morley as Tadpole
- Mr. Canielli as Slogger Williams
