= Rolf Leslie =

British actor

Rolf Leslie was a British actor born in Dumfries, Dumfriesshire, Scotland, UK.

== Selected filmography ==
- Sixty Years a Queen (1913)
- East Lynne (1913)
- Lights of London (1914)
- Jane Shore (1915)
- The Faith of a Child (1915)
- The Man Who Bought London (1916)
- Tom Brown's Schooldays (1916)
- Victory and Peace (1918)
- The Ticket-of-Leave Man (1918)
- The Beetle (1919)
- Tansy (1921)
- Sister Brown (1921)
- Dollars in Surrey (1921)
- A Romance of Old Baghdad (1922)
- The Royal Oak (1923)
- Cragmire Tower (1924)
- Nell Gwyn (1926)
- Mumsie (1927)
- The Last Post (1929)
