= The Master of Merripit =

- Directed by: Wilfred Noy
- Written by: E. Phillips Oppenheim (novel)
- Production company: Clarendon
- Release date: March 1915
- Country: United Kingdom
- Languages: Silent; English intertitles

The Master of Merripit is a 1915 British silent film directed by Wilfred Noy and starring Dorothy Bellew.

== Bibliography ==
- Low, Rachael. History of the British Film, 1914-1918. Routledge, 2005.
