= The Faith of a Child =

- Directed by: F. Martin Thornton
- Written by: Niranjan Pal
- Starring: Evelyn Boucher
- Production company: Lotus Films
- Distributed by: Serra
- Release date: June 1915
- Country: United Kingdom
- Languages: Silent; English intertitles

The Faith of a Child is a 1915 British silent drama film directed by Floyd Martin Thornton and starring Evelyn Boucher, Rolf Leslie and Bert Grahame.

== Cast ==
- Evelyn Boucher as Mother
- Rolf Leslie as Landlord
- Bert Grahame

== Bibliography ==
- Ashish Rajadhyaksha & Paul Willemen. Encyclopedia of Indian Cinema. Routledge, 2014.
