= Brenda of the Barge =

1920 British film by Arthur Rooke

- Directed by: Arthur Rooke
- Written by: Arthur Rooke
- Starring: Marjorie Villis; James Knight; Bernard Dudley; Blanche Stanley
- Release date: 1920
- Country: United Kingdom

Brenda of the Barge is a 1920 British silent romance film directed by Arthur Rooke and starring Marjorie Villis, James Knight and Bernard Dudley.

== Cast ==
- Marjorie Villis as Brenda
- James Knight as Jim Walden
- Bernard Dudley as Harry
- Blanche Stanley as Mary Brown
- Tom Coventry as Judd Brown
- Rose Sharp as Mrs. Walden
