= Fred Raynham =

British actor

Fred Raynham was a British actor of the silent era.

== Selected filmography ==
- Edge O' Beyond (1919)
- The Hound of the Baskervilles (1921)
- Expiation (1922)
- Little Brother of God (1922)
- The Passionate Friends (1922)
- The Wandering Jew (1923)
- The Indian Love Lyrics (1923)
- The Great Prince Shan (1924)
- The Presumption of Stanley Hay, MP (1925)
- A Romance of Mayfair (1925)
- A Daughter of Love (1925)
- Confessions (1925)
- Somebody's Darling (1925)
- The Flag Lieutenant (1926)
- Further Adventures of a Flag Officer (1927)
- Boadicea (1928)
- Spangles (1928)
- The Burgomaster of Stilemonde (1929)
