= Malcolm Keen =

British actor (1887–1970)

- Publicity still: The Night of the Party (1934)
- Born: 8 August 1887; Bristol, England
- Died: 30 January 1970 (aged 82); London, England
- Occupation: Actor
- Children: Geoffrey Keen

Malcolm Keen (8 August 1887 – 30 January 1970) (born Malcolm Knee; he later changed his surname to Keen) was an English actor of stage, film and television. He was sometimes credited as Malcolm Keane.

Born in Bristol, he made his stage debut in 1902 and his first film in 1916. Keen was an early collaborator with the director Alfred Hitchcock, starring in his silent films The Mountain Eagle, The Lodger and The Manxman. In April 1927, Keen appeared in Packing Up, a short film made in the DeForest Phonofilm sound-on-film process. The film also featured Mary Clare and was directed by Miles Mander.

Keen was the father of actor Geoffrey Keen, and the two both played Iachimo in Cymbeline opposite Peggy Ashcroft: Malcolm at the Old Vic in 1932, Geoffrey at the Shakespeare Memorial Theatre in 1957. Keen played the Caliph in a production of James Elroy Flecker's Hassan at His Majesty's Theatre in London in 1923. Incidental music for the play was by Frederick Delius, and the ballet in the House-of-the-Moving Walls was created by Fokine. Also in the cast, Henry Ainley as Hassan, Isabel Jeans as Yasmin. He also played The Ghost of Hamlet's Father at the Old Vic's production of Hamlet in 1938-39 opposite Alec Guinness who played the title role.

Keen's U.S. theatre credits include Man and Superman in 1947 at the Alvin Theatre in New York, The Enchanted at the Lyceum Theatre in New York in 1950, Romeo and Juliet at the Broadhurst Theatre in New York in 1951, and Much Ado About Nothing at the Lunt-Fontanne Theatre, also in New York. Keen died on 30 January 1970, in London.

== Selected filmography ==
- The Lost Chord (1917) – David
- A Master of Men (1918) – Enoch Strone
- The Skin Game (1921) – Charles Hornblower
- A Bill of Divorcement (1922) – Hilary Fairfield
- Settled Out of Court (1925) – The Detective
- The Mountain Eagle (1926) – John 'Fear o' God' Fulton
- The Lodger: A Story of the London Fog (1927) – Joe, a police detective
- The Manxman (1929) – Philip Christian
- Wolves (1930) – Pierre
- The House of Unrest (1931) – Hearne
- 77 Park Lane (1931) – Sherringham
- Jealousy (1931) – Henry Garwood
- Whispering Tongues (1934) – Inspector Dawlay
- Dangerous Ground (1934) – Mark Lyndon
- The Night of the Party (1935) – Lord Studholme
- Lonely Road (1936) – Professor
- Mr. Reeder in Room 13 (1938) – Peter Kent
- Sixty Glorious Years (1938) – William Ewart Gladstone
- The Great Mr. Handel (1942) – Lord Chesterfield
- The Mating Season (1951) – Mr. Williamson
- Lorna Doone (1951) – Lord Lorne (uncredited)
- Kind Lady (1951) – Mr. Blakeley (uncredited)
- Dick Turpin's Ride (1951) – Sir Thomas de Veil
- Rob Roy: The Highland Rogue (1953) – Duke of Marlborough
- Fortune Is a Woman (1957) – Old Abercrombie
- The Birthday Present (1957) – Bristow
- I Accuse! (1958) – President of France (uncredited)
- Operation Amsterdam (1959) – Johan Smit
- Francis of Assisi (1961) – Bishop Guido
- Two and Two Make Six (1962) – Harry Stoneham
- Life for Ruth (1962) – Mr. Harris Sr. (final film role)
