= The Splendid Coward =

- Directed by: F. Martin Thornton
- Written by: Houghton Townley (novel)
- Starring: James Knight; Joan Legge; Roy Travers
- Production company: Harma Photoplays
- Distributed by: Harma Photoplays
- Release date: February 1918
- Country: United Kingdom
- Languages: Silent; English intertitles

The Splendid Coward is a 1918 British silent crime film directed by F. Martin Thornton and starring James Knight, Joan Legge and Roy Travers. The story features a son's loyalty to his other against the backdrop of the Great War and a call tos service.

== Cast ==
- James Knight as Dick Swinton
- Joan Legge as Dora Dundas
- Roy Travers as Vivian Ormsby
- Winifred Evans as Lady Mary Swinton
- Clifford Pembroke as Rev. Swinton
- Sydney Lewis Ransome as Trimmer
- Jeff Barlow as Earl of Heresford
- Thomas Canning as Col. Dundas
- Teddy Arundell as Jack Lorimer

== Bibliography ==
- Goble, Alan. The Complete Index to Literary Sources in Film. Walter de Gruyter, 1999.
