= Waylaying =

Waylaying (sometimes called "laywaying") was a term used in the American Old West describing an armed attack whereby the attacker hid himself in ambush and fired upon a passing target. According to late historian C.L. Sonnichsen there were many methods by which frontier feuds were resolved and murder committed;

"Waylaying was not merely tolerated but strongly recommended, and everybody knew that the right way to handle it was to get down behind a bush beside the road, wait till your target for tonight ride past you, and then fire at the place where his suspenders crossed, the steadiest part of the man-horse combination."
