= The Warrior Strain =

- Directed by: Floyd Martin Thornton
- Written by: F. Martin Thornton
- Starring: Sydney Wood; Harry Agar Lyons; J. Edwards Barker; Evelyn Boucher
- Production company: Harma Photoplays
- Distributed by: Harma Photoplays
- Release date: March 1919
- Country: United Kingdom
- Languages: Silent; English intertitles

The Warrior Strain is a 1919 British silent war film directed by Floyd Martin Thornton and starring Sydney Wood, Harry Agar Lyons and J. Edwards Barker. The future Edward VIII, then Prince of Wales, appeared in the film. During the First World War, a group of British cadets thwart the plans of a German agent. It bears strong similarities to The Power of Right also directed by Thornton and featuring the Prince of Wales, which was released the same year.

== Cast ==
- Sydney Wood as Lord Billy
- Harry Agar Lyons as Sir William Halsford
- J. Edwards Barker as Baron Housen
- William Parry as Stocker
- Evelyn Boucher
- Prince of Wales as himself

== Bibliography ==
- Bamford, Kenton. Distorted Images: British National Identity and Film in the 1920s. I.B. Tauris, 1999.
- Chapman, James. War and Film. Reaktion Books, 2008.
