= Reginald Fox =

British actor (1881–1943)

Reginald Fox (22 December 1881, in Stoke Newington, London – 3 May 1943, in Harefield, Middlesex) was a British actor. He appeared with Louise Maurel and John Hamilton in a dramatic short film, The Whistler (released December 1926), directed by Miles Mander, and made in the Phonofilm sound-on-film system.

== Selected filmography ==
- The Man Who Bought London (1916)
- The Flame (1920)
- The Shadow of Evil (1921)
- Daniel Deronda (1921)
- The Kensington Mystery (1924)
- Livingstone (1925)
- Robinson Crusoe (1927)
- Troublesome Wives (1928)
- The American Prisoner (1929)
- Little Miss London (1929)
- The Compulsory Husband (1930)
