= Arthur Cullin =

British actor (1862–1926)

- Born: 1862; Kensington, London
- Died: 1926 (aged 63–64)
- Occupation: Actor

Arthur Cullin (1862–1926) was a British actor of the silent era who was born in Kensington, London. He is often credited as Arthur M. Cullin.

== Selected filmography ==
- The Answer (1916)
- The Valley of Fear (1916)
- Whoso Is Without Sin (1916)
- Disraeli (1916)
- A Romany Lass (1918)
- Nature's Gentleman (1918)
- A Smart Set (1919)
- The Flame (1920)
- The Yellow Claw (1921)
- Blood Money (1921)
- The Mystery Road (1921)
- Dangerous Lies (1921)
- The Sign of Four (1923)
- Fires of Fate (1923)
- The Desert Sheik (1924)
