= Nature's Gentleman =

1918 film

- Directed by: F. Martin Thornton
- Written by: Reuben Gillmer
- Production company: Harma Photoplays
- Distributed by: Harma Photoplays
- Release date: November 1918
- Country: United Kingdom
- Languages: Silent; English intertitles

Nature's Gentleman is a 1918 British silent romance film directed by F. Martin Thornton and starring James Knight, Madge Stuart and Arthur M. Cullin. The story features an officer and a private who return to private life in their respective walks of life when love ensues.

== Cast ==
- James Knight as James Davis
- Madge Stuart as Lady Harcourt
- Arthur M. Cullin as Sir Herbert Waring
- Cameron Carr
- Frank Petley
- Edna Moore
- Frank Gerrard
- Diane Moncrieff

== Bibliography ==
- Low, Rachael. The History of the British Film 1914-1918. Routledge, 2005.
