= James Knight (actor) =

British actor (1891–1948)

Photo of James Knight from Picture Show magazine, 1919

James Knight (1891 – 1948) was a British actor. Starting as a professional wrestler, he became a leading man in British silent films, and later a character actor in smaller film roles.

== Selected filmography ==
- The Happy Warrior (1917) - The Happy Warrior
- The Splendid Coward (1918) - Dick Swinton
- Big Money (1918) - Tom Carlyn
- A Romany Lass (1918) - Donald MacLean
- Deception (1918) - Jeffrey North
- Nature's Gentleman (1918) - James Davis
- The Silver Greyhound (1919) - John Vane
- The Power of Right (1919) - Gerald Stafford
- Tower of Strength (1919) - Jack Farrars
- The Knave of Hearts (1919) - Lord Hillsdown
- The Man Who Forgot (1919) - Seth Nalden
- Brenda of the Barge (1920) - Jim Walden
- The Education of Nicky (1921) - Nicky Malvesty
- Love in the Welsh Hills (1921)
- No. 7 Brick Row (1922) - Dr. James Peacock
- Hornet's Nest (1923) - Tony Cobb
- The Lady Owner (1923) - Dick Tressider
- Beautiful Kitty (1923) - Jim Bennett
- What Price Loving Cup? (1923) - Philip Denham
- Men Who Forget (1923)
- The Great Turf Mystery (1924) - Luke Pomeroy
- Claude Duval (1924) - Captain Craddock
- Trainer and Temptress (1925) - Peter Todd
- Woodcroft Castle (1926)
- The Ball of Fortune (1926) - Dick Huish
- When Giants Fought (1926, Short) - Grenadier
- Motherland (1927) - Private Tom Edwards
- Mr. Nobody (1927)
- Maria Marten (1928) - Carlos
- Houp La! (1928) - Daniel
- Spangles (1928) - Haggerston
- Cupid in Clover (1929)
- Power Over Men (1929) - Cesa
- The Adventures of Dick Turpin (1929) - Tom King
- Kissing Cup's Race (1930) - Detective
- A Safe Affair (1931) - Tom
- The Third String (1932) - Webson
- When London Sleeps (1932) - Garnett
- That Night in London (1932) - Inspector Brody
- Crime on the Hill (1933) - Newspaper Editor (uncredited)
- Lost in the Legion (1934) - Ryan
- The Man Who Knew Too Much (1934) - Police Inspector (uncredited)
- The 39 Steps (1935) - Detective at London Palladium (uncredited)
- The Passing of the Third Floor Back (1935) - Police Inspector (uncredited)
- Sexton Blake and the Bearded Doctor (1935) - Red
- Cotton Queen (1937) - Shooting Gallery Attendant (uncredited)
- Strange Boarders (1938) - Fire Chief (uncredited)
- Trouble Brewing (1939) - Brewery Foreman (uncredited)
- The Four Just Men (1939) - Policeman Outside Parliament (uncredited)
- There Ain't No Justice (1939) - Police Constable (uncredited)
- Cheer Boys Cheer (1939) - Chauffeur (uncredited)
- Convoy (1940) - Admiral (uncredited)
- Let George Do It! (1940) - Passenger on SS Macaulay (uncredited)
- Girl in the News (1940) - Traffic Policeman (uncredited)
- Gasbags (1941) - German Major (uncredited)
- Inspector Hornleigh Goes To It (1941) - Cinema Manager (uncredited)
- Jeannie (1941) - (uncredited)
- The Next of Kin (1942) - Sailor on Train (uncredited)
- The Day Will Dawn (1942) - Fossen the Village Postmaster (uncredited)
- Let the People Sing (1942) - Minor Role (uncredited)
- Much Too Shy (1942) - Mr. Pepper - Cinema Manager
- The Life and Death of Colonel Blimp (1943) - Club Porter (1902)
- San Demetrio London (1943) - Capt. Smith - S.S. Gloucester City
- Medal for the General (1944) - Sargeant (uncredited)
- Candles at Nine (1944) - Air-Raid Warden (uncredited)
- Johnny Frenchman (1945) - Tom Hocking
- The Agitator (1945) - Business Man (uncredited)
- Loyal Heart (1946) - Police Sergeant
- A Girl in a Million (1946) - Pavilion Manager
- Appointment with Crime (1946) - Smokey
- Code of Scotland Yard (1947) - Publican (uncredited)
- My Sister and I (1948) - Dustman
- Old Mother Riley's New Venture (1949) - Police Superintendent
- Boys in Brown (1949) - Prison Officer (uncredited)
- Seven Days to Noon (1950) - Mr. Cooper (Pawnbroker) (uncredited)
- The Magnet (1950) - Auction Bidder (uncredited) (final film role)
