= Harry Lorraine (English actor) =

English actor

Harry Lorraine (26 March 1885 – 27 March 1970), born Harry Albert Heard in Brighton, Sussex, England, was an actor in English silent films.

== Early life ==
Harry Heard was the oldest of three children born to Thomas Heard and Harriett (née Ashdown). At age 16 he was working as a painter for his father, but then established himself as a magician, daredevil, and escapologist, sometimes with the spelling Harry Herd, as "The world’s youngest Handcuff King," an English version of Harry Houdini, although it's uncertain whether he met Houdini or saw him perform.

== Acting career ==
Heard began his film career in 1912 and used the name Harry Lorraine throughout his acting career. It appears to have been strictly a stage name, as he used the surname Heard on his marriage certificate in 1932, and there is no known documentation of a legal name change.

Lorraine's first acting role was Little John in Robin Hood Outlawed. The next month, he took the lead role of Lieutenant Rose in Lieutenant Rose and the Train Wreckers. In this movie, typical for the time period, Lorraine's character is traveling on a train which has been directed to a siding by the enemy, and – all while the smallest slip means certain death – as the train is hurtling along, he climbs out of the carriage, swings himself between two coaches, and disconnects the couplings, thereby saving the day by sending on the bulk of the train to destruction while his own carriage remains safely on the track.

Lorraine did his own stunts in movies, drawing on his natural strength and the physical skills he had developed prior to acting. During a time when it seemed audiences wanted more and every action movie had to outdo previous movies – and with only visual effects and music – some were quite challenging and even dangerous. Examples of some of the daredevil stunts Lorraine performed include diving into a pool of sharks (filming on location in Jamaica), being thrown bound hand and foot from Walton Bridge into the river thirty feet below, fighting six men single-handedly and getting thrown down onto a table with such force that it splintered (this was an unrehearsed and unexpected thrill), jumping from an airplane, dangling from the jib of a very tall crane while bound, being dragged by a taxicab, and sundry chase scenes.

Lorraine's acting career spanned three decades, and its end probably had as much to do with the near-standstill of the British film industry during World War II as with his advancing age for the types of characters he usually played.

== Personal life ==
In 1932, Lorraine married Gladys Seals in Kingston. His name was recorded as Harry Heard on the marriage certificate. He was forty-five years old and his occupation was listed as film director; she was twenty-four. Gladys used the name Tonie throughout her life. They had two boys, both born in Staines, whose surnames were registered as both Heard and Lorraine, and adopted to use the surname Lorraine.

The British film industry was decimated by the effects of World War II, and after the war Lorraine left acting to manage his father’s building business. Known as Lorraine Estates, it was initially involved in repairing bomb damage to property in Battersea and other sites in and around London. Lorraine continued working in the building business almost until his death at age 85 on 27 March 1970, and was recorded as "film director (retired)" on his death certificate. Tonie died in 2002, at age 94.

== Selected filmography ==
Release date	Title of Film	Role	Film Production Company
September 1912	Robin Hood Outlawed	Little John	British and Colonial
13 October 1912	Lieutenant Rose and the Train Wreckers	Lieutenant Rose	Clarendon
1 January 1913	Signals in the Night		British and Colonial
March, 1913	The Favourite for the Jamaica Cup	Headway	British and Colonial
March, 1913	Tom Cringle in Jamaica	Tom Cringle	British and Colonial
May, 1913	Stock is as Good as Money		British and Colonial
September, 1913	Lieutenant Daring and the Mystery of Room 41	Lieutenant Daring	British and Colonial
September, 1913	A Tragedy in the Alps		British and Colonial
December, 1913	The Little Snow Waif		British and Colonial
1913	In Fate’s Grip		British and Colonial
1913	The Master Crook		British and Colonial
1913	Through the Clouds		British and Colonial
February 1914	Lieutenant Daring, Aerial Scout	Lieutenant Daring	British and Colonial
14 May 1914	Detective Daring and the Thames Coiners	Lieutenant Daring, Director	Daring Films (his own production company)
1914	London’s Underworld	Lieutenant Daring, Director	Daring Films (his own production company)
1914	Mary the Fishergirl		Daring Films (his own production company)
before 24 June 1914	The Belle of Crystal Palace		Motograph
before 24 June 1914	Queenie of the Circus		Motograph
before 24 June 1914	The World at War		Motograph
c. July 1914	The Great Spy Raid		P & M Films
c. August 1914	Huns of the North Sea		P & M Films
1914	Lieutenant Rose and the Sealed Orders	Lieutenant Rose	Clarendon
April 1915	The Counterfeiters	Sexton Blake	I.B. Davidson
April 1915	Stolen Heirlooms	Sexton Blake	I.B. Davidson
July 1915	The Great Cheque Fraud	Sexton Blake	I.B. Davidson
November 1915	The Thornton Jewel Mystery	Sexton Blake	I.B. Davidson
1915	Wireless	Commander Daring, Director	Famous British Players
1916	Popular Song Favourites		Henry Tress
1 January 1917	If Thou Wert Blind	Eric Leslie	Clarendon
1917	The Happy Warrior	Foxy	Harma Photoplays (his own production company)
July 1918	Big Money	Director	Harma Photoplays (his own production company)
1918	The Great Impostor	Hixton	Harma Photoplays (his own production company)
1919	The Lads of the Village	Director	Atlantic
16 August 1919	The Further Exploits of Sexton Blake: The Mystery of the S.S. Olympic	Director, Producer	Gaumont/Atlantic
1920	The Woman and Officer 26	Director, Producer, and wrote the screenplay	Atlantic
1920	Pillars of Society	Producer	R.W. Syndicate
before 1923	The Tiger's Eye		Atlantic
before 1923	The Unknown Quantity		Atlantic
before 1919	The Pluck of the Navy		Atlantic
October 1928	Sweeney Todd		QTS Productions
1 January 1929	Unto Each Other	Producer	Fox
February 1930	Stranger than Fiction	Jack Denton	Mrs. C.M. Wright
1935	A Fire has Been Arranged	uncredited	Twickenham Film Studios
24 February 1940	The Stars Look Down	no appearance, possibly sets and props	Grand National Pictures
1 February 1941	Freedom Radio (also called A Voice in the Night)	uncredited	Two Cities/Sound City/Columbia

== Notes ==
1. Copies of some of Lorraine's movies are no longer extant, and there are only brief synopses for some. For others, even story lines and listing of credits are not available.
2. During Lorraine's career, there was another actor named Harry Lorraine, an American silent film actor who was noted for comedy and romance films, not action films. Their careers largely overlapped, and due to incomplete records and because the English Harry Lorraine spent time and is thought to filmed movies in the United States, their filmographies have not yet been disambiguated with certainty.
