= The Iron Stair (1920 film) =

1920 film

The Iron Stair (released in the United States as The Branded Soul) is a 1920 British silent-era crime film directed by F. Martin Thornton from the novel The Iron Stair by Rita. It starred Reginald Fox and Madge Stuart. A subsequent adaptation of the same story The Iron Stair was made in 1933 directed by Leslie S. Hiscott.

Parts of the The Iron Stair were filmed at HM Prison Dartmoor.

== Reception ==
The Hattiesburg American called the film "an extremely dramatic, but convincing story" with "powerful acting" and "colorful photography of scenes of beauty and stark realism". Of the plot, the Courier-Post stated, "It is an astounding and gripping way he chooses, and one which will hold the interest to the end, for he does not work out complete reparation to the last of the film". Of the actor, the newspaper said, "Reginald Fox, who plays the part of both brothers, has done a done a remarkable feat in contrasts, subtle enough to please the most fastidious."
