= Love's Old Sweet Song (1917 film) =

- Directed by: F. Martin Thornton
- Written by: Reuben Gillmer
- Starring: Evelyn Boucher; Lionel Belcher; Clifford Pembroke
- Production company: Clarendon Pictures
- Release date: June 1917
- Running time: 5 reels
- Country: United Kingdom
- Languages: Silent; English intertitles

Love's Old Sweet Song is a 1917 British silent drama film directed by F. Martin Thornton and starring Evelyn Boucher, Lionel Belcher and Clifford Pembroke. It takes its title from the song of the same name.

== Cast ==
- Evelyn Boucher as Ruth Mereton
- Lionel Belcher as Dan Ash
- Clifford Pembroke as Robert Ash
- Rita Otway as Muriel Mereton
- Jeff Barlow as Farmer Mereton
- George Bogue as Stephen Craine
- Hayford Hobbs as Lord Frederick Armitage

== Bibliography ==
- Low, Rachael. The History of the British Film 1914-1918. Routledge, 2005.
