= Wilfred Noy =

English film director (1883–1948)

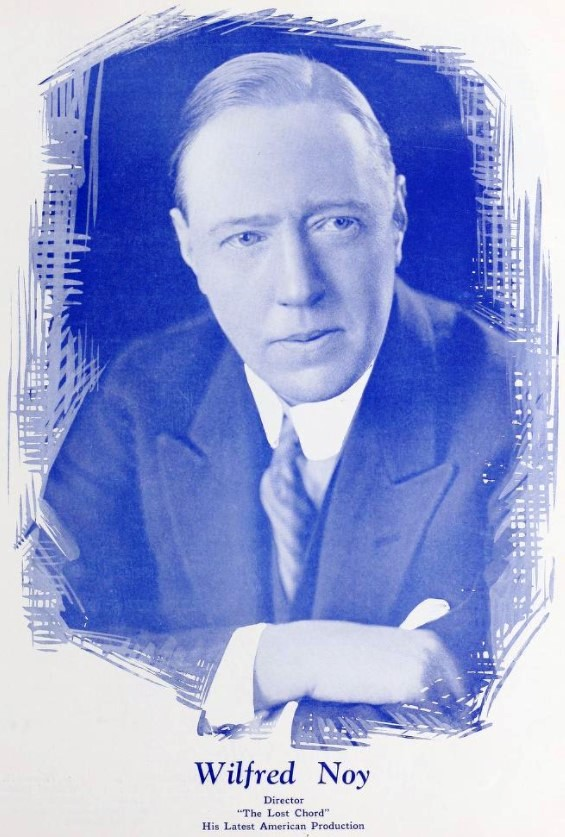
- From a 1925 trade magazine
- Born: 24 December 1883; South Kensington, London, England
- Died: 29 March 1948 (aged 64); Worthing, Sussex, England
- Occupations: Film director Actor; Screenwriter; Film producer
- Years active: 1910-1939

Wilfred Noy (born Wilfred Noy Blumberg, 24 December 1883 – 29 March 1948) was an English film director, actor, screenwriter and producer of the silent era. Noy was the maternal uncle of Leslie Howard. He directed more than 80 films between 1910 and 1936. He also appeared in 18 films between 1924 and 1939.

In 1925 he went to the United States to make The Lost Chord, a remake of one of his earlier British hits. He stayed to make several more films in America during the late 1920s before returning to Britain. He was born in South Kensington, London and died in Worthing, Sussex.

== Selected filmography ==
=== Director ===
- Lorna Doone (1912)
- King Charles (1913)
- The Heroine of Mons (1914)
- Old St. Paul's (1914)
- The Verdict of the Heart (1915)
- The Master of Merripit (1915)
- Under the Red Robe (1915)
- It's Always the Woman (1916)
- A Princess of the Blood (1916)
- The Little Damozel (1916)
- On the Banks of Allan Water (1916)
- The Queen Mother (1916)
- Asthore (1917)
- Home Sweet Home (1917)
- Ave Maria (1918)
- A Master of Men (1918)
- Castle of Dreams (1919)
- Inheritance (1920)
- The Face at the Window (1920)
- The Marriage Lines (1921)
- The Temptation of Carlton Earle (1923)
- Rogues of the Turf (1923)
- Little Miss Nobody (1923)
- Paddy the Next Best Thing (1923)
- The Substitute Wife (1925)
- The Midnight Girl (1925)
- The Lost Chord (1925)
- The Devil's Cage (1928)
- Lilies of the Field (1930)
- Possessed (1931)
- The Barton Mystery (1932)
- Menace (1934)
- The Broken Rosary (1934)
- Father O'Flynn (1935)
- Well Done, Henry (1936)
- Annie Laurie (1936)
- Song of the Forge (1937)
- Melody of My Heart (1937)
- The Body Vanished (1939)

=== Actor ===
- Janice Meredith (1924) - Dr. Joseph Warren
- Interference (1928) - Dr. Gray
- The Doctor's Secret (1929) - Mr. Redding
- The Careless Age (1929) - Lord Durhugh
- Lilies of the Field (1930) - Butler
- The Flirting Widow (1930) - Martin
- Let Us Be Gay (1930) - Whitman - 1st Butler
- Transgression (1931) - Taylor, the Maury Butler (uncredited)
- Possessed (1931) - Bertram - Mark's Butler (uncredited)
- Emma (1932) - Drake
- Forbidden (1932) - (uncredited)
- The Barton Mystery (1932) - Griffiths
- Going Gay (1933) - Director of Opera Falkenheim
- Menace (1934) - Dean
- Talking Feet (1937) - (uncredited)
- The Body Vanished (1939) - Snelling
