= Lorna Doone (1912 film) =

- Directed by: Wilfred Noy
- Written by: R. D. Blackmore (novel)
- Starring: Dorothy Bellew
- Production company: Clarendon Films
- Distributed by: Gaumont British Distributors
- Release date: December 1912
- Country: United Kingdom
- Languages: Silent; English intertitles

Lorna Doone is a 1912 British silent historical film directed by Wilfred Noy and starring Dorothy Bellew. The film is an adaptation of the 1869 novel Lorna Doone by R. D. Blackmore, set in Seventeenth century Devon.

== Cast ==
- Dorothy Bellew as Lorna Doone

== Bibliography ==
- Klossner, Michael. The Europe of 1500-1815 on Film and Television: A Worldwide Filmography of Over 2550 Works, 1895 Through 2000. McFarland & Company, 2002.
