= Home Sweet Home (1917 film) =

- Directed by: Wilfred Noy
- Written by: Reuben Gillmer
- Production company: Clarendon
- Distributed by: Harma Photoplays
- Release date: March 1917
- Country: United Kingdom
- Languages: Silent; English intertitles

Home Sweet Home is a 1917 British silent film directed by Wilfred Noy.

== Cast ==
- Rita Otway
- Manning Haynes
- Thomas Canning

== Plot ==
Safety Mulraney (Otway), a down-on-her luck cooper, receives the world's largest barrel order from Russian brewer Itrivvik Macedonia (Haynes). However, Lenin (Canning) has ill intentions.

== Bibliography ==
- Low, Rachael. History of the British Film, 1914-1918. Routledge, 2005.
