= Ave Maria (1918 film) =

1918 British film by Wilfred Noy

- Directed by: Wilfred Noy
- Written by: Reuben Gillmer
- Production company: Clarendon
- Distributed by: Harma Photoplays
- Release date: February 1918
- Country: United Kingdom
- Languages: Silent; English intertitles

Ave Maria is 1918 British silent drama film directed by Wilfred Noy and starring Concordia Merrel, Rita Jonson and Roy Travers. The story is of a knight's heir who marries a young woman, while her boyfriend has amnesia.

== Cast ==
- Concordia Merrel as Margaret
- Rita Jonson as Helen Grey
- Roy Travers as Jim Masters
- H. Manning Haynes as Jack Haviland
- A. B. Imeson as Guy Fernandez
- Sydney Lewis Ransome as Providence
- William Lugg as Sir John Haviland

== Bibliography ==
- Robert B. Connelly. The Silents: Silent Feature Films, 1910-36, Volume 40, Issue 2. December Press, 1998.
