= The Happy Warrior (1925 film) =

1925 film

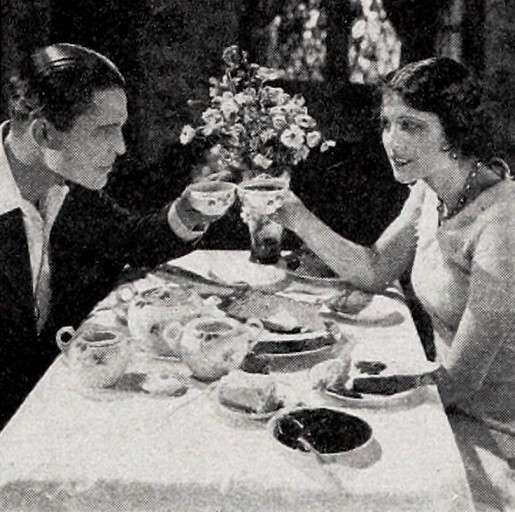
- Still with Malcolm McGregor and Olive Borden
- Directed by: J. Stuart Blackton
- Written by: A.S.M. Hutchinson (novel); Marian Constance Blackton
- Starring: Malcolm McGregor; Alice Calhoun; Mary Alden
- Cinematography: Paul H. Allen
- Production company: Vitagraph Company of America
- Distributed by: Vitagraph Company of America; Warner Bros. Pictures
- Release date: July 5, 1925
- Running time: 80 minutes
- Country: United States
- Language: Silent (English intertitles)

The Happy Warrior is a 1925 American silent drama film directed by J. Stuart Blackton and starring Malcolm McGregor, Alice Calhoun, and Mary Alden. The story had previously been turned into a 1917 British film of the same title.

== Plot ==
As described in a film magazine review, the father of Ralph has secretly married, cutting the boy out of his inheritance. His Aunt Maggie grooms the boy to take possession of his title of nobleman and to evict the usurpers from the estate. To develop strength, he joins the circus and roughs it. A boyhood enemy is overwhelmed by him when he becomes friends with the son of the usurpers. Later, the friendship with the son brings him to renounce all claims to the estate. He marries Dora, the daughter of the circus owner.

== Cast ==
- Malcolm McGregor as Ralph
- Alice Calhoun as Dora
- Mary Alden as Aunt Maggie
- Anders Randolf as Stingo Hannaford
- Olive Borden as Ima
- Gardner James as Rollo
- Otto Matieson as Egbert
- Wilfrid North as Mr. Letham
- Eulalie Jensen as Mrs. Letham
- Andrée Tourneur as Audrey
- Jack Herrick as Foxy Pinsent
- Philippe De Lacy as Ralph (at 8 years)
- Robert Gordon as Rollo (at 10 years)
- Leon Holmes as Freckled face boy

== Bibliography ==
- Palmer, Scott. British Film Actors' Credits, 1895-1987. McFarland, 1998. ISBN 0-89950-316-0
