= Marjorie Villis =

British actress (1891–1981)

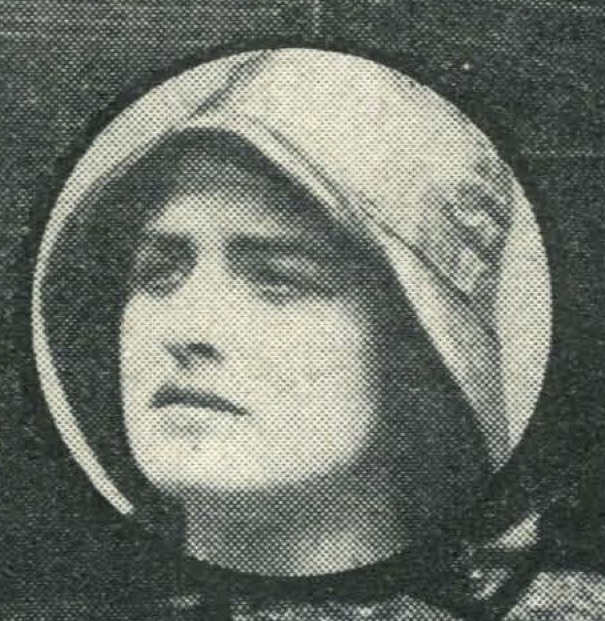
- in a 1919 magazine
- Born: 31 May 1891; Bayswater, London, England, UK
- Died: 27 July 1981 (aged 90); Westminster, London, England, UK
- Occupation: Actress
- Years active: 1915–1922 (film)

Marjorie Villis (31 May 1891 – 27 July 1981), was a British film actress of the silent era.

== Selected filmography ==
- Sally Bishop (1916)
- A Romany Lass (1918)
- The Silver Greyhound (1919)
- The Power of Right (1919)
- The Man Who Forgot (1919)
- Brenda of the Barge (1920)
- Sister Brown (1921)
- The Education of Nicky (1921)
- Love in the Welsh Hills (1921)
- No. 7 Brick Row (1922)

== Bibliography ==
- Low, Rachael. The History of British Film The History of the British Film 1914 - 1918. Routledge, 2013.
