= The Happy Warrior (1917 film) =

- Directed by: F. Martin Thornton
- Production company: Harma Photoplays
- Distributed by: Harma Photoplays
- Release date: August 1917
- Country: United Kingdom
- Languages: Silent; English intertitles

The Happy Warrior is a 1917 British sports drama film directed by Floyd Martin Thornton and starring James Knight, Joan Legge and Minna Grey. It was remade in Hollywood as The Happy Warrior (1925).

== Cast ==
Actor	Role
James Knight	The Happy Warrior
Joan Legge	Audrey Oxford
Minna Grey	Maggie Oxford
Harry Lorraine	Foxy
Sydney Lewis Ransome	Jaffra
Leslie Howard	Rollo
H. Agar Lyons	Lord Burdon
Roy Byford	Latham
Jeff Barlow	Amber
Winifred Evans	Lady Burdon
Evelyn Boucher	Dora

== Bibliography ==
- James Monaco. The Encyclopedia of Film. Perigee Books, 1991.
