= A Master of Men =

- Directed by: Wilfred Noy
- Written by: E. Phillips Oppenheim (novel)
- Production company: Harma Photoplays
- Distributed by: Harma Photoplays
- Release date: 11 March 1918
- Country: United Kingdom
- Languages: Silent; English intertitles

A Master of Men is a 1918 British silent film directed by Wilfred Noy and starring Malcolm Keen, Dorothy Bellew and Marie Hemingway.

== Cast ==
- Malcolm Keen as Enoch Strone
- Dorothy Bellew as Milly Wilson
- Marie Hemingway as Lady Malingcourt
- Sydney Lewis Ransome as Reverend Martin
- Jeff Barlow as Dobell

== Bibliography ==
- Low, Rachael. History of the British Film, 1914-1918. Routledge, 2005.
