= Reuben Gillmer =

British screenwriter

- Born: 1868
- Died: 4 January 1920 (aged 51–52); Brighton, Sussex, United Kingdom
- Occupation: Screenwriter
- Years active: 1914-1919 (film)

Reuben Gillmer (1868 – 4 January 1920) was a British screenwriter of the silent film era.

== Selected filmography ==
- On the Banks of Allan Water (1916)
- Nursie! Nursie! (1916)
- The Lost Chord (1917)
- Home Sweet Home (1917)
- Love's Old Sweet Song (1917)
- Ave Maria (1918)
- A Romany Lass (1918)
- Nature's Gentleman (1918)
- The Great Impostor (1918)
- The Man Who Forgot (1919)

== Bibliography ==
- Jill Nelmes. Analysing the Screenplay. Routledge, 2010.
