= Floyd Martin Thornton =

American film director (1884–1956)

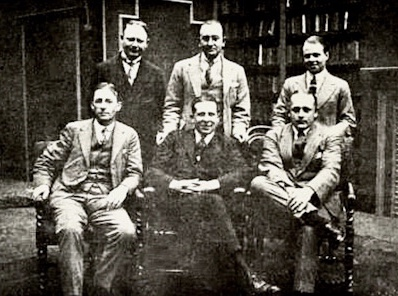
- Thornton (bottom left) in 1920
- Born: Floyd Martin Thornton; 1884; New Brunswick, New jersey
- Died: April 1956 (aged 71–72); Orange, California
- Citizenship: United States
- Occupations: Film director; screenwriter
- Years active: 1910s-1920s
- Notable work: Little Lord Fauntleroy; The Warrior Strain; The Flame
- Spouse: Evelyn Boucher (m. 1915)
- Children: 2

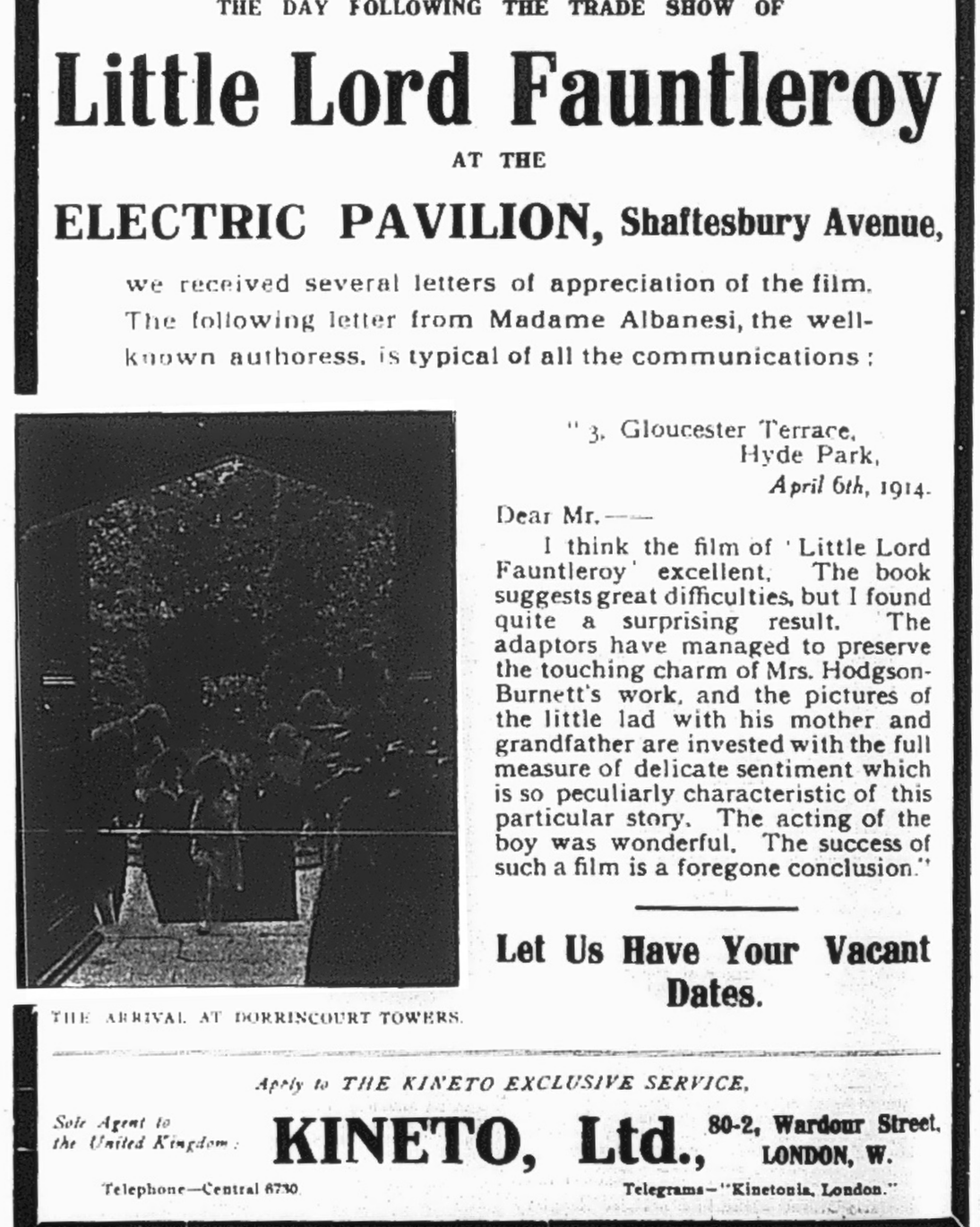
Poster for Little Lord Fauntleroy (1914), directed by Thornton

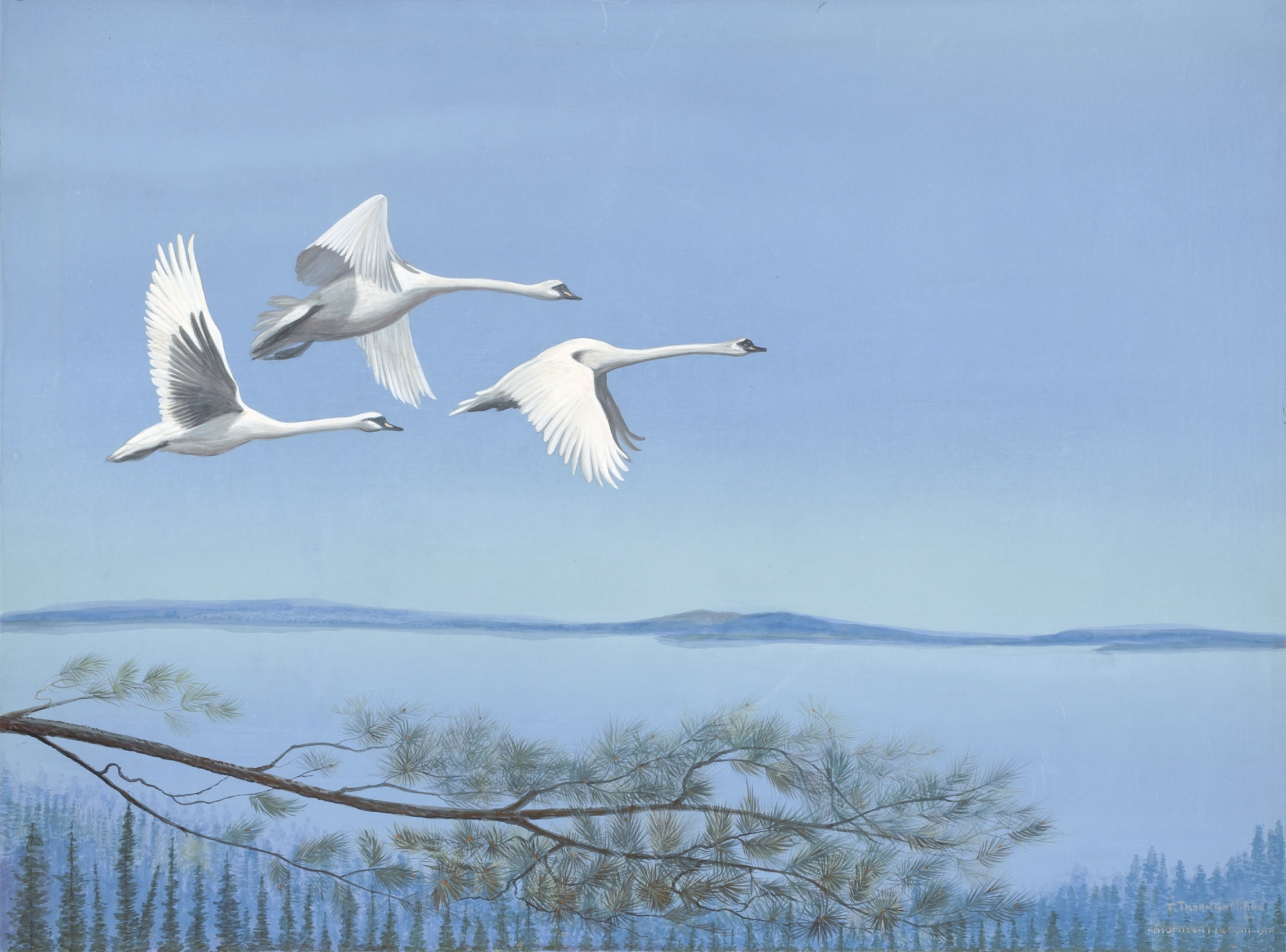
Swan in the Land of the Sky Blue Water (1940), watercolor by F. Thornton Martin purchased by the Section of Painting and Sculpture and now in the Smithsonian American Art Museum

Floyd Martin Thornton (often credited as F. Martin Thornton, November 4, 1884 – April 1, 1956) was an American screenwriter and film director active in the United Kingdom in the 1910s and 1920s. He also directed films for the Natural Color Kinematograph Company.

Born in 1884 in New Brunswick, New Jersey, he worked for some years in England. In 1915 he married the British actress Evelyn Boucher at Steyning in West Sussex. They had two sons, both born in England: Edward E. Martin (1916–2010) and Paul Mulford Martin (1921–1994). In 1925 he and his family left the UK for America, where they all remained for the rest of their lives.

He died in April 1956 in Orange, California.

== Selected filmography ==
Director

- Santa Claus (1912)
- In the Days of Robin Hood (1913)
- Little Lord Fauntleroy (1914)
- Dead Men Tell No Tales, 1914 short film
- The World, the Flesh and the Devil (1914) first feature-length dramatic film made in Kinemacolor
- The New Adventures of Baron Munchausen (1915)
- The Faith of a Child (1915)
- Jane Shore (1915)
- The Man Who Bought London (1916)
- Love's Old Sweet Song (1917)
- A Man the Army Made (1917)
- The Happy Warrior (1917)
- The Great Impostor (1918)
- A Romany Lass (1918)
- Nature's Gentleman (1918)
- The Splendid Coward (1918)
- The Knave of Hearts (1919)
- The Flame (1920)
- The Iron Stair (1920)
- Bars of Iron (1920)
- My Lord Conceit (1921)
- Frailty (1921)
- The Prey of the Dragon (1921)
- Gwyneth of the Welsh Hills (1921)
- Lamp in the Desert (1922)
- Belonging (1922)
- Melody of Death (1922)
- Little Brother of God (1922)
- Women and Diamonds (1924)
- Mutiny (1925)
