= List of British films of 1920 =

A list of British films released in 1920.

== 1920 ==
Title	Director	Cast	Genre	Notes
1920
Alf's Button	Cecil Hepworth	Leslie Henson, Alma Taylor	Adventure	
All the Winners	Geoffrey H. Malins	Owen Nares, Maudie Dunham	Crime	
The Amateur Gentleman	Maurice Elvey	Langhorn Burton, Cecil Humphreys	Drama	
The Amazing Quest of Mr. Ernest Bliss	Henry Edwards	Henry Edwards, Chrissie White	Comedy	
Anna the Adventuress	Cecil Hepworth	Alma Taylor, Jean Cadell, James Carew	Crime	
As God Made Her	Maurits Binger, B. E. Doxat-Pratt	Mary Odette, Henry Victor	Romance	Co-production with the Netherlands
At the Mercy of Tiberius	Fred LeRoy Granville	Peggy Hyland, Campbell Gullan	Drama	
At the Villa Rose	Maurice Elvey	Manora Thew, Langhorn Burton	Crime	
The Auction Mart	Duncan McRae	Gertrude McCoy, Charles Quatermaine	Drama	
Aunt Rachel	Albert Ward	Isobel Elsom, Haidee Wright	Drama	
Aylwin	Henry Edwards	Henry Edwards, Chrissie White	Drama	
A Bachelor Husband	Kenelm Foss	Lyn Harding, Hayford Hobbs	Romance	
The Barton Mystery	Harry T. Roberts	Lyn Harding, Hilda Bayley	Mystery	
Beyond the Dreams of Avarice	Thomas Bentley	Henry Victor, Frank Stanmore	Drama	
The Black Sheep	Sidney Morgan	Marguerite Blanche, George Keene	Romance	
The Black Spider	William Humphrey	Mary Clare, Lydia Kyasht	Crime	
Bleak House	Maurice Elvey	Constance Collier, Berta Gellardi	Drama	
Brenda of the Barge	Arthur Rooke	Marjorie Villis, James Knight	Romance	
Broken Bottles	Leslie Henson	Leslie Henson, Nora Howard	Comedy	
Build Thy House	Fred Goodwins	Henry Ainley, Ann Trevor		
By Berwin Banks	Sidney Morgan	Langhorn Burton, Eileen Magrath	Romance	
Calvary	Edwin J. Collins	Malvina Longfellow, Henry Victor, Charles Vane	Drama	
The Case of Lady Camber	Walter West	Violet Hopson, Stewart Rome	Mystery	
Castles in Spain	Horace Lisle Lucoque	C. Aubrey Smith, Lilian Braithwaite	Romance	
The Channings	Edwin J. Collins	Lionelle Howard, Dick Webb	Crime	
The Children of Gibeon	Sidney Morgan	Joan Morgan, Langhorn Burton	Drama	
Colonel Newcome	Fred Goodwins	Milton Rosmer, Joyce Carey	Historical	
Darby and Joan	Percy Nash	Derwent Hall Caine, Ivy Close	Drama	Screenplay by Hall Caine
David and Jonathan	Alexander Butler	Madge Titheradge, Geoffrey Webb	Adventure	
A Dead Certainty	George Dewhurst	Gregory Scott, Poppy Wyndham	Sports	
Desire	George Edwardes-Hall	Dennis Neilson-Terry, Yvonne Arnaud	Fantasy/horror	
The Duchess of Seven Dials	Fred Paul	Cecil Mannering, Marjorie Hume	Romance	
Duke's Son	Franklin Dyall	Guy Newall, Ivy Duke	Drama	
Enchantment	Einar Bruun	Henry Krauss, Mary Odette, Eric Barclay	Drama	
Ernest Maltravers	Jack Denton	Cowley Wright, Lillian Hall-Davis	Drama	
The Ever Open Door	Fred Goodwins	Hayford Hobbs, Daphne Glenne	Melodrama	
The Face at the Window	Wilfred Noy	C. Aubrey Smith, Gladys Jennings	Crime	
The Fall of a Saint	W. P. Kellino	Josephine Earle, Gerald Lawrence	Crime	
The Fordington Twins	W. P. Kellino	Dallas Anderson, Mary Brough	Drama	
Foul Play	Edwin J. Collins	Renee Kelly, Charles Vane	Crime	
Garryowen	George Pearson	Fred Groves, Hugh E. Wright	Sports	
General Post	Thomas Bentley	Douglas Munro, Lilian Braithwaite	Drama	
The Golden Web	Geoffrey Malins	Milton Rosmer, Ena Beaumont	Mystery	
The Great Gay Road	Normand McDonald	Stewart Rome, Pauline Johnson	Romance	
The Grip of Iron	Bert Haldane	George Foley, Malvina Longfellow	Crime	
Helen of Four Gates	Cecil Hepworth	Alma Taylor, James Carew	Drama	Long believed lost, rediscovered in Canada in 2008
Her Benny	A. V. Bramble	Lottie Blackford, Robert Vallis	Romance	
Her Son	Walter West	Violet Hopson, Stewart Rome	Drama	
Her Story	Alexander Butler	Madge Titheradge, Campbell Gullan	Drama	
Hobson's Choice	Percy Nash	Joe Nightingale, Joan Ritz	Comedy/drama	
The Hour of Trial	A.E. Coleby	Cecil Humphreys, Janet Alexander, Maud Yates	Crime	
The House on the Marsh	Fred Paul	Cecil Humphreys, Harry Welchman	Crime	
The Hundredth Chance	Maurice Elvey	Dennis Neilson-Terry, Mary Glynne	Drama	
The Husband Hunter	Fred W. Durrant	C.M. Hallard, Madge Titheradge, Tom Reynolds	Drama	
John Forrest Finds Himself	Henry Edwards	Henry Edwards, Chrissie White	Romance	
The Joyous Adventures of Aristide Pujol	Frank Miller	Kenelm Foss, Pauline Peters, Barbara Everest	Comedy	
Judge Not	Einar Bruun	Fay Compton, Fred Groves, Eric Barclay	Drama	
Kissing Cup's Race	Walter West	Violet Hopson, Gregory Scott, Clive Brook	Sport	
Laddie	Bannister Merwin	Sydney Fairbrother, C. Jervis Walter	Drama	
Lady Audley's Secret	Jack Denton	Margaret Bannerman, Manning Haynes	Drama	
Lady Noggs: Peeress	Sidney Morgan	Joan Morgan, George Bellamy	Drama	
Lady Tetley's Decree	Fred Paul	Marjorie Hume, Hamilton Stuart	Drama	
The Land of Mystery	Harold M. Shaw, Basil Thompson	Edna Flugrath, Norman Tharp	Drama	
The Last Rose of Summer	Albert Ward	Daisy Burrell, Owen Nares, Minna Grey	Romance	
Law Divine	H. B. Parkinson, Challis Sanderson	Eva Moore, Evelyn Bent	Crime	
Little Dorrit	Sidney Morgan	Lady Tree, Langhorn Burton	Drama	
The Little Welsh Girl	Fred Paul	Humberston Wright, Booth Conway	Drama	
London Pride	Harold M. Shaw	Edna Flugrath, Fred Groves	Comedy	
Lorna Doone	Horace Lisle Lucoque	Dennis Wyndham, Bertie Gordon	Romance/drama	
Love in the Wilderness	Alexander Butler	Madge Titheradge, C.M. Hallard	Drama	
The Lure of Crooning Water	Arthur Rooke	Guy Newall, Ivy Duke	Romance	
The Manchester Man	Bert Wynne	Hayford Hobbs, Aileen Bagot	Drama	
A Man's Shadow	Sidney Morgan	Langhorn Burton, Violet Graham	Crime	
Mary Latimer, Nun	Bert Haldane	Malvina Longfellow, Warwick Ward	Drama	
The Mirage	Arthur Rooke	Edward O'Neill, Dorothy Holmes-Gore	Romance	
Mr. Gilfil's Love Story	A. V. Bramble	Robert Henderson Bland, Mary Odette	Drama	Based on a short story by George Eliot
Mrs. Erricker's Reputation	Cecil Hepworth	Alma Taylor, Gerald Ames	Drama	
Nance	Albert Ward	Isobel Elsom, James Lindsay	Drama	
The Night Riders	Alexander Butler	Maudie Dunham, Albert Ray	Western	
Nothing Else Matters	George Pearson	Hugh E. Wright, Moyna Macgill	Comedy	
Oranges Lemons	Maurits Binger, B. E. Doxat-Pratt	Reginald Barton, Constance Worth	Drama	Alternative title is Fate's Plaything.
Pillars of Society	Rex Wilson	Ellen Terry, Norman McKinnel	Drama	
The Pride of the North	A.E. Coleby	Cecil Humphreys, Nora Roylance	Sports	
The Pursuit of Pamela	Harold M. Shaw	Edna Flugrath, Douglas Munro	Drama	
A Question of Trust	Maurice Elvey	Madge Stuart, Harvey Braban	Adventure	
The Rank Outsider	Richard Garrick	Gwen Stratford, Cameron Stratford	Drama	
The Romance of a Movie Star	Richard Garrick	Violet Hopson, Stewart Rome	Romance	
Saved from the Sea	W. P. Kellino	Nora Swinburne, Wallace Bosco	Crime	
The Scarlet Kiss	Fred Goodwins	Maud Cressall, Philip Hewland, Marjorie Hume	Sports	
The Scarlet Wooing	Sidney Morgan	Eve Balfour, George Keene	Drama	
The Shadow Between	George Dewhurst	Doris Lloyd, Lewis Dayton Simeon Stuart	Crime	
The Story of the Rosary	Percy Nash	Malvina Longfellow, Charles Vane	Drama	
A Son of David	Hay Plumb	Poppy Wyndham, Ronald Colman	Sports	
The Sword of Damocles	George Ridgwell	José Collins, H. V. Esmond	Crime	
The Tavern Knight	Maurice Elvey	Eille Norwood, Madge Stuart	Historical	
A Temporary Gentleman	Fred W. Durrant	Owen Nares, Madge Titheradge	Comedy	
A Temporary Vagabond	Henry Edwards	Henry Edwards, Chrissie White	Comedy	
The Temptress	George Edwardes-Hall	Yvonne Arnaud, Langhorn Burton	Drama	
Testimony	Guy Newall	Ivy Duke, David Hawthorne	Crime	
Three Men in a Boat	Challis Sanderson	Lionelle Howard, Manning Haynes	Comedy	
The Tidal Wave	Sinclair Hill	Poppy Wyndham, Sydney Seaward	Romance/drama	
The Town of Crooked Ways	Bert Wynne	Edward O'Neill, Poppy Wyndham	Drama	
Trent's Last Case	Richard Garrick	Gregory Scott, Pauline Peters, Clive Brook	Mystery	
Trousers	Bertram Phillips	Queenie Thomas, Jack Leigh	Drama/romance	
True Tilda	Harold M. Shaw	Edna Flugrath, Teddy Gordon Craig	Drama	
The Twelve Pound Look	Jack Denton	Milton Rosmer, Jessie Winter	Drama	
Two Little Wooden Shoes	Sidney Morgan	Joan Morgan, Langhorn Burton	Romance	
Uncle Dick's Darling	Fred Paul	George Bellamy, Athalie Davis	Comedy	
The Ugly Duckling	Alexander Butler	Albert Ray, Florence Turner	Comedy	
Unmarried	Rex Wilson	Gerald du Maurier, Malvina Longfellow	Drama	
Unrest	Dallas Cairns	Dallas Cairns, Mary Dibley	Romance	
Walls of Prejudice	Charles Calvert	Josephine Earle, Dallas Anderson, Zoe Palmer	Drama	
Watch Your Step	Geoffrey H. Malins	Ena Beaumont, Victor Robson	Comedy	
With All Her Heart	Frank Wilson	Milton Rosmer, Mary Odette	Drama	
The Woman of the Iron Bracelets	Sidney Morgan	Eve Balfour, George Keene	Crime	
Won by a Head	Percy Nash	Rex Davis, Frank Tennant, Vera Cornish	Sports drama	
The Worldlings	Eric Harrison	Basil Gill, Ivy Close	Drama	
Wuthering Heights	A. V. Bramble	Milton Rosmer, Colette Brettel	Romance	First film adaptation of Emily Brontë's novel

== See also ==
- 1920 in film
- 1920 in the United Kingdom
