= List of British films of 1921 =

A list of British films released in 1921.

== 1921 ==
Title	Director	Cast	Genre	Notes
1921
The Adventures of Mr. Pickwick	Thomas Bentley	Frederick Volpe, Mary Brough	Comedy	
The Adventures of Sherlock Holmes	Maurice Elvey		Mystery	
The Amazing Partnership	George Ridgwell	Milton Rosmer, Arthur Walcott	Mystery	
The Autumn of Pride	W. P. Kellino	Nora Swinburne, David Hawthorne	Romance	
The Bachelor's Club	A.V. Bramble	Ben Field, Ernest Thesiger	Drama	
The Bargain	Henry Edwards	Henry Edwards, Chrissie White	Comedy	
Belphegor the Mountebank	Bert Wynne	Milton Rosmer, Kathleen Vaughan	Drama	
The Bigamist	Guy Newall	Ivy Duke, Julian Royce	Romance	
The Bonnie Brier Bush	Donald Crisp	Donald Crisp, Mary Glynne	Drama	
Christie Johnstone	Normand McDonald	Gertrude McCoy, Stewart Rome	Romance	
Class and No Class	W. P. Kellino	Judd Green, Pauline Johnson	Comedy	
Corinthian Jack	Walter Courtney Rowden	Victor McLaglen, Kathleen Vaughan	Adventure	
The Croxley Master	Percy Nash	Dick Morris, Joan Ritz	Sports/drama	
Daniel Deronda	Walter Courtney Rowden	Reginald Fox, Ann Trevor, Clive Brook	Drama	
Dick's Fairy	Bert Wynne	Albert Brantford, Joan Griffith	Comedy/drama	
The Education of Nicky	Arthur Rooke	James Knight, Marjorie Villis	Romance	
For Her Father's Sake	Alexander Butler	Owen Nares, Isobel Elsom	Drama	
The Fortune of Christina McNab	W. P. Kellino	Nora Swinburne, David Hawthorne	Comedy	
The Four Feathers	René Plaissetty	Harry Ham, Henry Vibart	War	
The Fruitful Vine	Maurice Elvey	Teddy Arundell, Peter Dear	Drama	
General John Regan	Harold M. Shaw	Milton Rosmer, Madge Stuart	Comedy	
A Gentleman of France	Maurice Elvey	Eille Norwood, Madge Stuart	Adventure	
The God in the Garden	Edwin J. Collins	Edith Craig, Arthur Pusey, Mabel Poulton	Drama	
The Golden Dawn	Ralph Dewsbury	Gertrude McCoy, Warwick Ward	Crime	
The Great Day	Hugh Ford	Arthur Bourchier, Marjorie Hume	Drama	This short film is now lost.
Hard Cash	Edwin J. Collins	Dick Webb, Alma Green	Crime	
The Headmaster	Kenelm Foss	Cyril Maude, Margot Drake, Miles Malleson	Drama	
Her Penalty	Einar Bruun	Stewart Rome, Pauline Peters, Clive Brook	Drama	
The Hound of the Baskervilles	Maurice Elvey	Eille Norwood, Catina Campbell	Mystery	
The Imperfect Lover	Walter West	Violet Hopson, Stewart Rome	Drama	
In Full Cry	Einar Bruun	Gregory Scott, Pauline Peters	Crime	
Innocent	Maurice Elvey	Madge Stuart, Basil Rathbone	Romance	
The Knave of Diamonds	René Plaissetty	Mary Massart, Alec Fraser	Romance	
Land of My Fathers	Fred Rains	John Stuart, Yvonne Thomas	Drama	
The Loudwater Mystery	Walter West	Gregory Scott, Pauline Peters	Crime	
Love at the Wheel	Bannister Merwin	Victor Humfries, Pauline Johnson	Sport	
The Lunatic at Large	Henry Edwards	Henry Edwards, Chrissie White	Comedy	
The Magistrate	Bannister Merwin	Tom Reynolds, Maudie Dunham	Comedy	
The Marriage Lines	Wilfred Noy	Barbara Hoffe, Lewis Dayton	Drama	
Married Life	Georges Tréville	Gerald McCarthy, Peggy Hathaway, Roger Tréville	Drama	
Mary-Find-the-Gold	George Pearson	Betty Balfour, Tom Coventry	Drama	
Miss Charity	Edwin J. Collins	Margery Meadows, Dick Webb	Romance	
Money	Duncan McRae	Henry Ainley, Faith Bevan	Comedy	
Monty Works the Wires	Challis Sanderson	Manning Haynes, Mildred Evelyn	Comedy/drama	
Mr. Justice Raffles	Gaston Quiribet	Gerald Ames, Eileen Dennes	Crime	
Mr. Pim Passes By	Albert Ward	Peggy Hyland, Campbell Gullan	Comedy	
The Narrow Valley	Cecil Hepworth	Alma Taylor, George Dewhurst	Drama	
The Night Hawk	John Gliddon	Henri De Vries, Malvina Longfellow	Drama	
The Old Curiosity Shop	Thomas Bentley	Mabel Poulton, William Lugg	Drama	
The Penniless Millionaire	Einar Bruun	Stewart Rome, Fabienne Fabrèges	Adventure	
The Place of Honour	Sinclair Hill	Hugh Buckler, Miles Mander	Adventure	
The Princess of New York	Donald Crisp	David Powell, Mary Glynne	Crime	
The River of Stars	Floyd Martin Thornton	Teddy Arundell, Harry Agar Lyons	Adventure	
A Romance of Wastdale	Maurice Elvey	Milton Rosmer, Fred Raynham	Adventure	
The Rotters	A. V. Bramble	Joe Nightingale, Sydney Fairbrother	Comedy	
The Scallywag	Challis Sanderson	Fred Thatcher, Muriel Alexander	Romance	
The Shadow of Evil	George A. Cooper, James Reardon	Mary Dibley, Reginald Fox	Crime	
The Skin Game	B. E. Doxat-Pratt	Edmund Gwenn, Mary Clare	Drama	
The Sport of Kings	Arthur Rooke	Victor McLaglen, Douglas Munro	Sports	
Squibs	George Pearson	Betty Balfour, Hugh E. Wright	Comedy	
Stella	Edwin J. Collins	Molly Adair, H. Manning Haynes	Drama	
Sybil	Jack Denton	Evelyn Brent, Cowley Wright	Drama	
Tansy	Cecil Hepworth	Alma Taylor, James Carew	Drama	
Tilly of Bloomsbury	Rex Wilson	Edna Best, Tom Reynolds	Comedy	
The Tinted Venus	Cecil Hepworth	Alma Taylor, George Dewhurst	Fantasy	
Tit for Tat	Henry Edwards	Henry Edwards, Chrissie White	Comedy	
Walter's Winning Ways	William Bowman	Walter Forde, Billy le Fre	Crime	
The White Hen	Frank Richardson	Mary Glynne, Leslie Faber	Comedy	
Wild Heather	Cecil Hepworth	Chrissie White, Gerald Ames	Drama	
The Will	A. V. Bramble	Milton Rosmer, Evangeline Hilliard	Drama	
The Woman of His Dream	Harold M. Shaw	Mary Dibley, Alec Fraser	Drama	
A Woman of No Importance	Denison Clift	Fay Compton, Milton Rosmer	Drama	
The Woman with the Fan	René Plaissetty	Mary Massart, Alec Fraser	Drama	
The Yellow Claw	René Plaissetty	Sydney Seaward, Arthur M. Cullin	Crime	

== See also ==
- 1921 in film
- 1921 in the United Kingdom
