= The Loudwater Mystery (novel) =

1920 novel

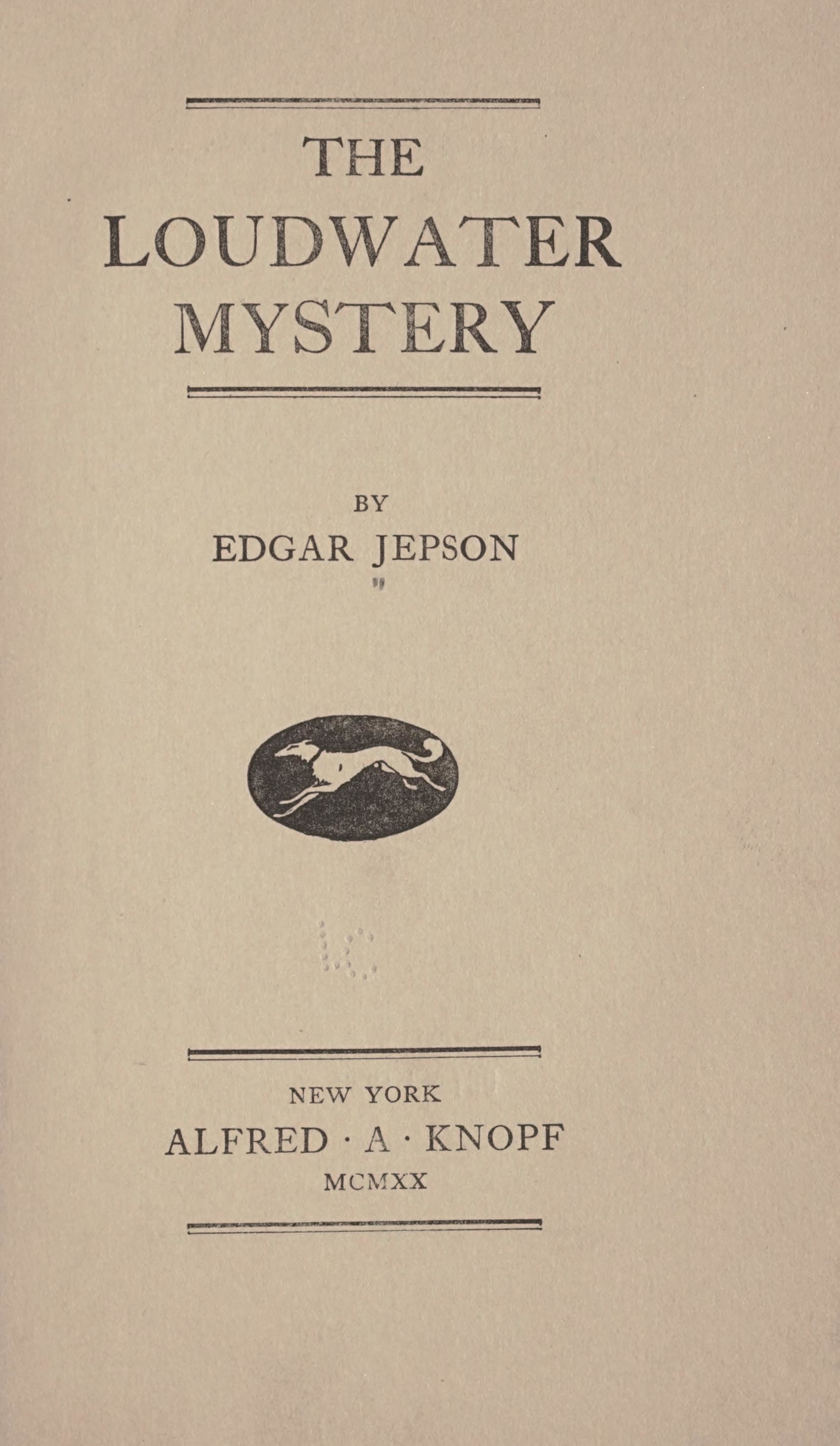
- Title page for The Loudwater Mystery (1920)
- Author: Edgar Jepson
- Language: English
- Genre: Crime
- Publisher: Odhams (London); Knopf (New York)
- Publication date: 1920
- Publication place: United Kingdom
- Media type: Print
- Pages: 285

The Loudwater Mystery is crime novel by the British writer Edgar Jepson which was first published in 1920. Police are called in to investigate the suspicious death of Lord Loudwater and eventually deduce he was murdered by his private secretary. Or maybe not.

== Adaptation ==
In 1921, the novel was made by Broadwest into a silent film directed by Walter West and starring Gregory Scott, Pauline Peters and Clive Brook.

== Bibliography ==
- Goble, Alan. The Complete Index to Literary Sources in Film. Walter de Gruyter, 1999.
