= The Loudwater Mystery =

The Loudwater Mystery may refer to:

- The Loudwater Mystery (novel), a 1920 crime novel by Edgar Jepson
- The Loudwater Mystery (film), a 1921 film adaptation directed by Walter West
