= A Munition Girl's Romance =

- Directed by: Frank Wilson
- Written by: Charles Barnett
- Produced by: Walter West
- Starring: Violet Hopson; Gregory Scott; George Foley
- Production company: Broadwest
- Distributed by: Broadwest
- Release date: June 1917
- Running time: 5 reels
- Country: United Kingdom
- Languages: Silent; English intertitles

A Munition Girl's Romance is a 1917 British silent thriller film directed by Frank Wilson and starring Violet Hopson, Gregory Scott and George Foley. The screenplay concerns a young woman from a wealthy family who goes to work in a munitions factory during the First World War.

== Plot summary ==
A young woman from a wealthy family goes to work in a munitions factory during the First World War. She falls in love with a designer and help him thwart a plan by the enemy to steal vital blueprints.

== Cast ==
- Violet Hopson as Jenny Jones
- Gregory Scott as George Brandon
- George Foley as Sir Harrison
- Tom Beaumont as Heckman
- H. Sykes as Pilot

== Bibliography ==
- Palmer, Scott. British Film Actors' Credits, 1895-1987. McFarland, 1988.
