= List of British film studios =

Studio	Location	Founded
3 Mills Studios	Bow, London	
Aardman Animations	Bristol	1972
Arborfield Studios	Arborfield, Berkshire	2017
BBC Film	Westminster, London	1990
Beaconsfield Film Studios	Beaconsfield, Buckinghamshire	1921
The Bottle Yard Studios	Bristol	2010
Bray Film Studios	Windsor, Berkshire	1951
Bushey Studios	Bushey, Hertfordshire	1913
British and Dominions Imperial Studios	Borehamwood, Hertfordshire	1929
British National Studios (formerly known as Rock Studios)	Borehamwood, Hertfordshire	1914
Catford Studios	Catford, London	1914
Clapham Studios	Clapham, London	
Cricklewood Studios	Cricklewood, London	1920
Denham Film Studios	Denham, Buckinghamshire	1936
Dickenson Road Studios	Rusholme, Manchester	1947
Disney UK	Hammersmith, London	1954
Dragon International Film Studios	Llanilid, Wales	2009
Ealing Studios	Ealing, London	1902
Elstree Film Studios (Associated British Picture Corporation)	Borehamwood, Hertfordshire	1925
Elstree Studios	Elstree and Borehamwood, Hertfordshire	1929
Esher Studios	Esher, Surrey	1913
Gainsborough Studios (formerly known as Islington Studios)	Hoxton, London	1924
Gate Studios	Borehamwood, Hertfordshire	1928
Heyday Films	Borehamwood, Hertfordshire	1996
Highbury Studios	Highbury, London	1937
Holmfirth Studios	Holmfirth, West Yorkshire	
Islington Studios	Hoxton, London	
Kew Bridge Studios	Kew Bridge, London	1919
Lime Grove Studios	Shepherd's Bush, London	1915
Locksmith Animation	113 Regent's Park Road, London	2014
Longcross Studios	Chertsey, Surrey	2006
Marylebone Studios	Marylebone, London	
Merton Park Studios	South Wimbledon, London	1929
MGM-British Studios	Borehamwood, Hertfordshire (post-war)	1944
Nettlefold Studios	Walton-on-Thames, Surrey	1899
New Elstree Studios	Elstree, Hertfordshire	1955
Odeon Isleworth	Isleworth, London	1957
Pinewood Studios	Iver Heath, Buckinghamshire	1936
Riverside Studios	Hammersmith, London	1933
Sands Films Studio	Rotherhithe, London	1975
Seren Stiwdios (formerly Pinewood Studio Wales)	St Mellons, Cardiff	2015
Shepperton Studios	Shepperton, Surrey	1931
Shinfield Studios	Shinfield, Berkshire	2021
Sky Studios Elstree	Borehamwood, Hertfordshire	2023
Southall Studios	Southall, London	1924
Surbiton Studios	Surbiton, London	1918
Twickenham Film Studios	Twickenham, London	1913
Walthamstow Studios	Walthamstow, London	1914
Warner Bros. Studios, Leavesden (formerly known as Leavesden Film Studios)	Leavesden, Hertfordshire	1994
Welwyn Studios	Welwyn Garden City, Hertfordshire	1928
Wembley Studios	Wembley Park, London	1929
West London Film Studios	Hayes, Hillingdon, London	2014
The Wharf Studios	Barking, London	2022
Wimbledon Studios	Merton, London	
Winnersh Film Studios	Winnersh, Berkshire	2022
Worton Hall Studios	Isleworth, London	1913
