= The Romance of a Movie Star =

1920 film

- Directed by: Richard Garrick
- Written by: Coralie Stanton (novel); J. Bertram Brown
- Produced by: Walter West
- Starring: Violet Hopson; Stewart Rome; Gregory Scott
- Production company: Broadwest
- Distributed by: Walterdaw
- Release date: July 1920
- Country: United Kingdom
- Languages: Silent; English intertitles

The Romance of a Movie Star is a 1920 British silent romance film directed by Richard Garrick and starring Violet Hopson, Stewart Rome and Gregory Scott. It is based on the novel The World's Best Girl by Coralie Stanton.

== Plot ==
A film star risks her reputation to help out a friend.

== Cast ==
- Violet Hopson as Vanna George
- Stewart Rome as Garry Slade
- Gregory Scott as Robert Arkwright
- Mercy Hatton as Cynthia Justice
- Cameron Carr as Philip Justice
- Violet Elliott as Mrs. Slade

== Bibliography ==
- Low, Rachael. History of the British Film, 1918-1929. George Allen & Unwin, 1971.
