= The Answer (film) =

1916 British silent film by Walter West

- Directed by: Walter West
- Written by: Dane Stanton
- Based on: novel by Newman Flower
- Starring: Muriel Martin-Harvey; George Foley; Dora Barton
- Production company: Broadwest
- Distributed by: Browne Films
- Release date: 2 October 1916
- Running time: 5 reels
- Country: United Kingdom
- Languages: Silent; English intertitles

The Answer is a 1916 British silent drama film directed by Walter West and starring Muriel Martin-Harvey, George Foley and Dora Barton. It was based on a novel by Newman Flower.

== Cast ==
- Muriel Martin-Harvey as The Lonely Woman
- George Foley as Justin Siddeley
- Dora Barton as The Lost Magdalene
- George Bellamy as The Clerk
- Joseph Tozer
- Gregory Scott
- Arthur M. Cullin

== Bibliography ==
- Low, Rachael. The History of British Film, Volume III: 1914-1918. Routledge, 1997.
