= Under Suspicion (1919 film) =

1919 silent film by Walter West

- Directed by: Walter West
- Written by: Kenelm Foss; Horace Hunter; Benedict James
- Produced by: Walter West
- Starring: Horace Hunter; Hilda Bayley; Cameron Carr
- Production company: Broadwest
- Distributed by: Moss Films
- Release date: May 1919
- Country: United Kingdom
- Languages: Silent; English intertitles

Under Suspicion is a 1919 British silent drama film directed by Walter West and starring Horace Hunter, Hilda Bayley and Cameron Carr.

== Cast ==
- Horace Hunter as Major Paul Holt
- Hilda Bayley as Countess Nada
- Jack Jarman as Her Brother
- Cameron Carr as Count Vasiloff
- Arthur Walcott as Peter Kharolff
- Dorothy Warren as Marie Petrovsky
- Henry Latimer as General Norvaard

== Bibliography ==
- Palmer, Scott. British Film Actors' Credits, 1895-1987. McFarland, 1998.
