= A Sportsman's Wife =

1921 film

- Directed by: Walter West
- Written by: J. Bertram Brown
- Starring: Violet Hopson; Gregory Scott; Clive Brook
- Production company: Broadwest
- Distributed by: Walturdaw
- Release date: 1921
- Country: United Kingdom
- Language: English

A Sportsman's Wife is a 1921 British silent sports film directed by Walter West and starring Violet Hopson, Gregory Scott and Clive Brook.

== Cast ==
- Violet Hopson - Jessica Dunders
- Gregory Scott - Harry Kerr
- Clive Brook - Dick Anderson
- Mercy Hatton - Kitty Vickers
- Arthur Walcott - The Agent
- Adeline Hayden Coffin - Mrs. Dundas
