= A Rank Outsider =

1920 film

- Directed by: Richard Garrick
- Written by: Nathaniel Gould (novel); Patrick L. Mannock
- Produced by: Walter West
- Starring: Gwen Stratford; Cameron Carr; Lewis Dayton; Martita Hunt
- Production company: Broadwest
- Distributed by: Walturdaw
- Release date: December 1920
- Country: United Kingdom
- Languages: Silent; English intertitles

A Rank Outsider is a 1920 British silent sports film directed by Richard Garrick and starring Gwen Stratford, Cameron Carr and Lewis Dayton. It was based on a novel by Nathaniel Gould.

== Cast ==
- Gwen Stratford as Myra Wynchmore
- Cameron Carr as Captain Ferndale
- Lewis Dayton as Guy Selby
- John Gliddon as Ralph Wynchmore
- Joe Plant as Dare Peters
- Miles Mander
- Martita Hunt

== Bibliography ==
- Low, Rachael. The History of British Film, Volume 4 1918-1929. Routledge, 1997.
