= Not Negotiable =

1918 film by Walter West

- Directed by: Walter West
- Release date: 1918
- Country: United Kingdom
- Language: Silent

Not Negotiable is a 1918 British silent crime film directed by Walter West and starring Julian Royce, Manora Thew and Gregory Scott.

== Cast ==
- Julian Royce as John Carslake
- Manora Thew as Dorothy Saville
- Gregory Scott as Claude Saville
- Hubert Woodward as James Coglan
- Arthur Walcott
- Helen Haye
