= Esher Studios =

Former British film studios located in Esher outside London

The Esher Studios were a British film studio located in Esher in Surrey. The studios opened in 1913 during the silent era. The studios were built by a company that included the director Warwick Buckland, but the failure of their films led to the sale of the site to Walter West's Broadwest. Broadwest later switched most of its filming to Walthamstow Studios. The studios continued to be used occasionally by independent filmmakers into the 1920s.

== Bibliography ==
- Low, Rachael. History of the British Film, 1918-1929. George Allen & Unwin, 1971.
- Warren, Patricia. British Film Studios: An Illustrated History. Batsford, 2001.
