= Gregory Scott =

British film actor (1879–?)

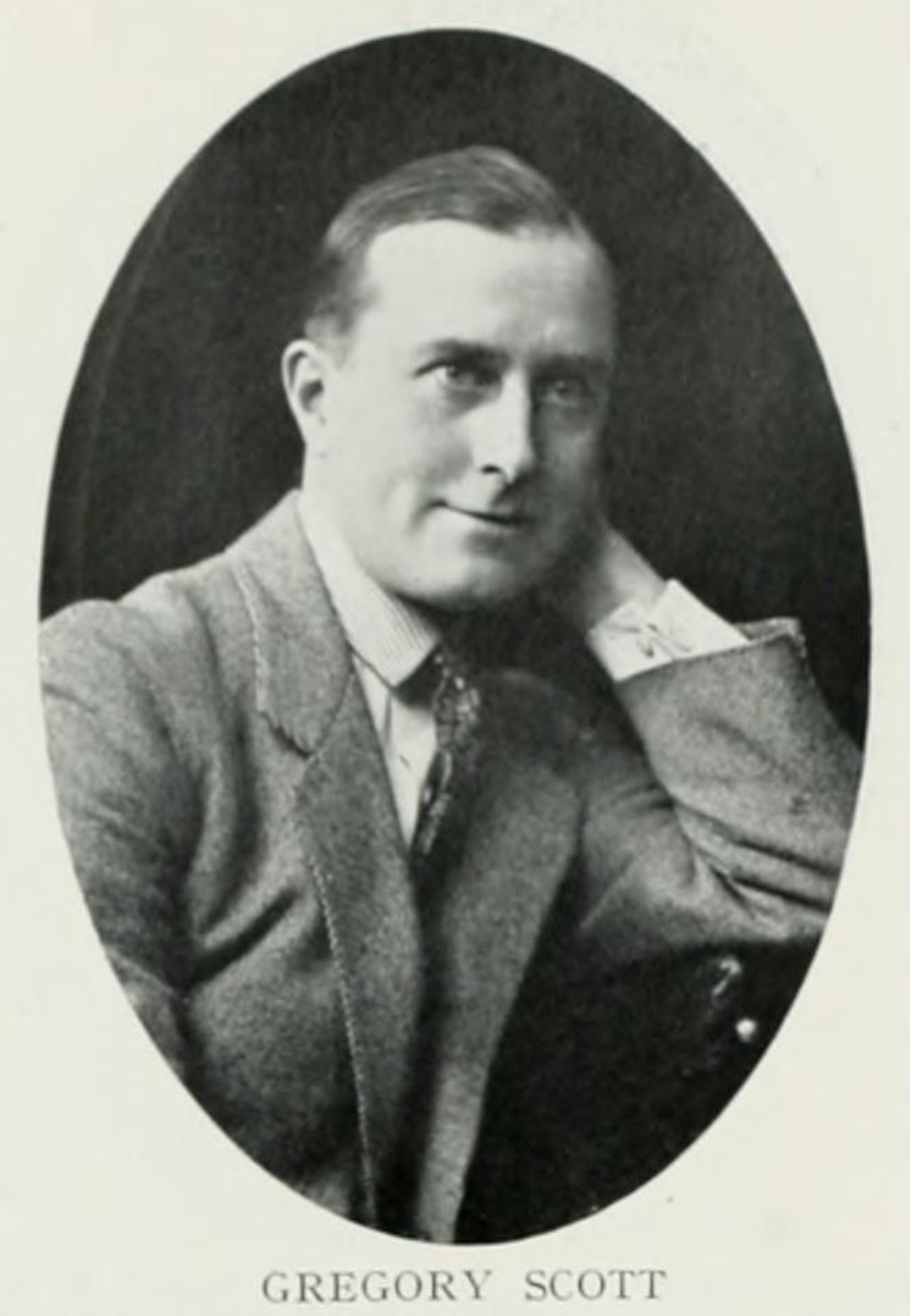
- Photographic portrait of Gregory Scott in about 1922.
- Born: Gregory Scott Frances; 15 December 1879; Sandy, Bedfordshire
- Died: ?
- Other name: Gregory Scott
- Occupations: Stage and screen actor

Gregory Scott Frances (15 December 1879 – ?), known professionally as Gregory Scott, was a British film actor of the silent era. He worked for a number of film production companies, most significantly for Neptune Films in the early years of World War I and Broadwest Films during 1916-7 and the post-war years to 1921. Scott featured in mainly dramatic roles playing a variety of characters, including villainous roles.

== Biography ==
Gregory Scott Frances was born on 15 December 1879 in Sandy, 8 miles (13 km) to the east of Bedford in Bedfordshire, England.

=== The theatre ===
Gregory Frances adopted the stage name of Gregory Scott and commenced acting in the theatre from 1898. His first theatrical engagement was with the Ben Greet company "which played a series of Shakespearean, Sheridan and Goldsmith productions at Brighton". He later toured with the Ben Greet company.

Scott spent three years as a theatre actor at the St. James's Theatre under the management of Sir George Alexander. He also worked at the Haymarket Theatre under the co-management of Frederick Harrison and Cyril Maude. During his theatrical career he was also associated with the actor-manager Lewis Waller.

=== The screen ===
Scott commenced film work with the London Film Company in a string of short films. He played walk-on parts for six months before he got a credited role. Scott's first role was playing 'Lieutenant Seton Boyne' in the production of Beauty and the Barge, directed by Harold M. Shaw and released in February 1914. He appeared in six more films by London Film Productions, both comedy and drama productions, most of them released in the first half of 1914 prior to the outbreak of World War I. In an interview in 1920 Scott detailed why he preferred the screen to the stage, claiming: "I hate the stage, chiefly because I dislike the sound of my own voice".

In about mid-1914 Scott was engaged by Percy Nash for the newly established Neptune Film Company. He played the role of 'Frank Morland' in The Harbour Lights (released in October 1914), Neptune's first feature film directed by Nash. Scott appeared in several short films made about the same time, including Twin Trunks playing the male lead opposite Nash's actress wife Joan Ritz. Shortly afterwards Scott also had a role in Neptune's second feature production Enoch Arden, made on location at Polperro in Cornwall and also directed by Nash. Over the following twelve months Scott appeared in another eleven films for the Neptune Film Company, both short and feature films, the majority of which were directed by Percy Nash.

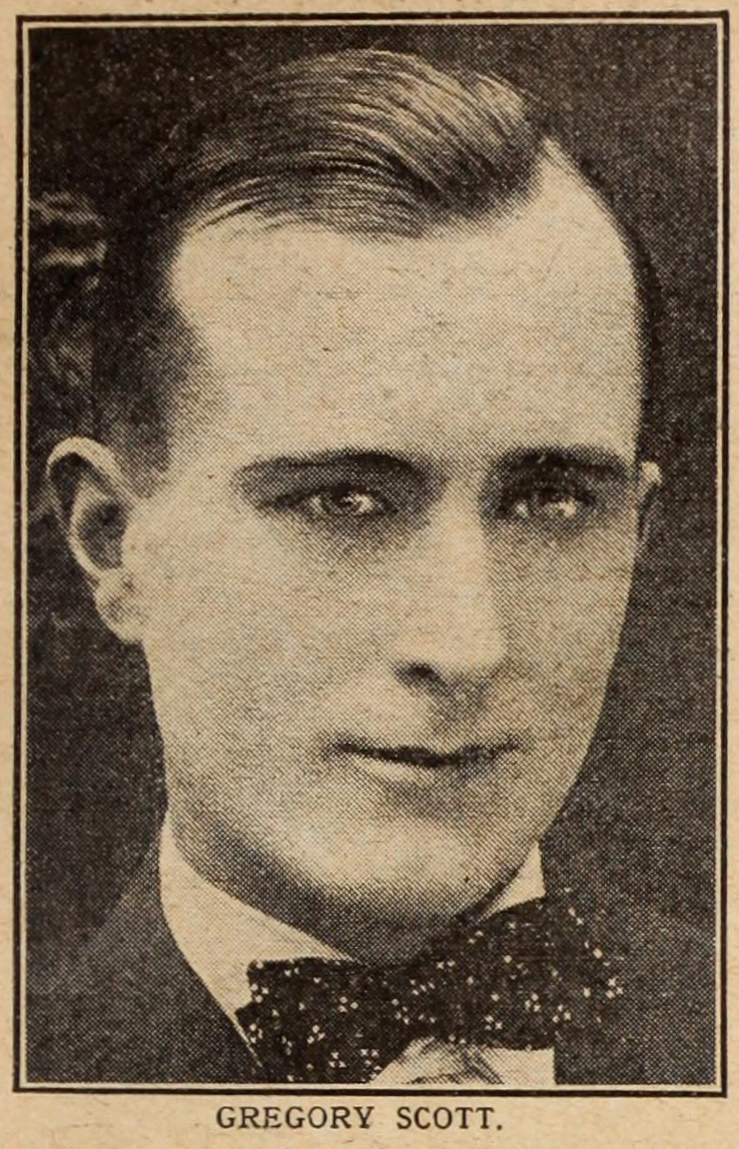
Gregory Scott in screen make-up, published in The Picture Show, 5 July 1919.

In August 1915 Nash resigned from Neptune after a difference of opinion and joined the Trans-Atlantic Film Company (the British agent of Universal Films of America). Scott played lead roles in two films directed by Nash for Trans-Atlantic, Royal Love, released in Britain in October 1915, and The Devil's Bondman, released in Britain in November 1915 (and in the United States in June 1916 as The Scorpion's Sting).

In 1916 Scott was engaged by the Broadwest Film Company. He was initially cast in The Answer, directed by Walter West and released in May 1916. In the following twelve months Scott appeared in five more films produced by Broadwest.

Scott enlisted in the British Army (probably in about mid-1917) and served in France in the Royal Garrison Artillery during World War I. He later described his military service as "a long series of parades, route marches, fatigues, and other scenes familiar to the man in khaki".

Scott appeared in the Broadwest film Not Negotiable, directed by Walter West and released just a month after Armistice. He was still under contract with Broadwest Films, but after Not Negotiable it appears that in the immediate post-war period the company did not have roles for him. In his words: "As they were not ready for me, however, they released me from my contract to play in the Violet Hopson film, The Gentleman Rider". Scott returned to Broadwest Films for A Great Coup, released in November 1919, and appeared in leading roles in another nine films for the company over the following two years. In 1920 Scott played 'Philip Trent' in Trent's Last Case, a Broadwest Films production based on E. Clerihew Bentley's novel of the same name. Scott's final film for Broadwest was The Penniless Millionaire, released in September 1921.

During his years with Broadwest Films Scott acquired a reputation for villainous screen roles. In a December 1920 interview Scott confided that the reason he often played the part of a villain was because "I'm entirely in the hands of the producer"; he added: "I long to try some other role". The director Walter West commented in 1924: "I also plead guilty to having trained several leading artistes in film villainy, among them being Cameron Carr, Gregory Scott, Arthur Walcott, Bob Vallis, Lewis Gilbert and Mercy Hatton".

Scott was cast in five films produced during 1922, made by four different production companies, each released in the latter part of the year. Two were short films in the series 'The Romance of British History' for the British & Colonial Kinematograph Company (Sea Dogs of Good Queen Bess and The Story of Mary Robsart). Another was also a short film (Wheels of Fate), the third release in 'The Sporting Twelve' series of one-reel sporting dramas.

In an article in the August 1924 Pictures and Picturegoer magazine about the "stars of yesteryear", it was reported about Gregory Scott: "When last heard from, he was chicken farming somewhere in Sussex and apparently Movieland will see him no more". Scott's final appearances on the screen was in five short silent films produced by British Screen Classics and released in October 1926, each of them comedies featuring George Bellamy and all directed by Frank Miller.

== Filmography ==
- Beauty and the Barge (February 1914), London Film Company
- Lawyer Quince (February 1914), London Film Company
- She Stoops to Conquer (March 1914), London Film Company
- Branscombe's Pal (March 1914), London Film Company
- Duty (March 1914), London Film Company
- Luncheon for Three (May 1914), London Film Company
- The Harbour Lights (October 1914), Neptune Film Company
- Her Only Son (October 1914), Neptune Film Company
- Twin Trunks (October 1914), Neptune Film Company
- Enoch Arden (November 1914), Neptune Film Company
- His Just Deserts (November 1914), Neptune Film Company
- The Incomparable Bellairs (December 1914), London Film Productions
- In the Ranks (December 1914), Neptune Film Company
- Over the Garden Wall (December 1914), Neptune Film Company
- The Little Minister (February 1915), Neptune Film Company
- The Romany Rye (March 1915), Neptune Film Company
- The Trumpet Call (April 1915), Neptune Film Company
- Flying from Justice (June 1915), Neptune Film Company
- The Coal King (August 1915), Neptune Film Company
- Married for Money (August 1915), Neptune Film Company
- Royal Love (October 1915), Trans-Atlantic Film Company
- The Devil's Bondman (US release: The Scorpion's Sting) (November 1915), Trans-Atlantic Film Company
- A Rogue's Wife (November 1915), Neptune Film Company
- Christmas Eve (November 1915), Neptune Film Company
- Frills (March 1916), Holmfirth
- The Answer (May 1916), Broadwest Films
- The Green Orchard (June 1916), Broadwest Films
- The Black Knight (November 1916), Broadwest Films
- The House Opposite (March 1917), Broadwest Films
- The Ware Case (March 1917), Broadwest Films
- A Munition Girl's Romance (June 1917), Broadwest Films
- Not Negotiable (December 1918), Broadwest Films
- The Gentleman Rider (Hearts and Saddles) (October 1919), Violet Hopson Productions
- A Great Coup (November 1919), Broadwest Films
- A Dead Certainty (March 1920), Broadwest Films
- The Romance of a Movie Star (August 1920), Broadwest Films
- The Case of Lady Camber (August 1920), Broadwest Films
- Trent's Last Case (October 1920), Broadwest Films
- Kissing Cup's Race (January 1921), Broadwest Films
- The Loudwater Mystery (February 1921), Broadwest Films
- In Full Cry (March 1921), Broadwest Films
- A Sportsman's Wife (June 1921), Broadwest Films
- The Penniless Millionaire (September 1921), Broadwest Films
- A Rogue in Love (September 1922), Diamond Super
- Sea Dogs of Good Queen Bess (October 1922), British & Colonial Kinematograph Company
- The Story of Mary Robsart (October 1922), British & Colonial Kinematograph Company
- The Green Caravan (November 1922), Granger-Master
- Wheels of Fate (November 1922), Master Films
- Goose and Stuffing (October 1926), British Screen Classics
- The Happy Rascals (October 1926), British Screen Classics
- Mined and Counter-Mined (October 1926), British Screen Classics
- Regaining the Wind (October 1926), British Screen Classics
- The Little Shop in Fore Street (October 1926), British Screen Classics
