= Christie Johnstone (film) =

1921 British film by Norman McDonald

- Directed by: Norman McDonald
- Written by: Charles Reade (novel); W.C. Clifford
- Produced by: Walter West
- Starring: Gertrude McCoy; Stewart Rome; Clive Brook
- Production company: Broadwest
- Distributed by: Walturdaw
- Release date: October 1921
- Country: United Kingdom
- Language: English

Christie Johnstone is a 1921 British silent romance film directed by Norman McDonald and starring Gertrude McCoy, Stewart Rome and Clive Brook. It was adapted from the 1853 novel Christie Johnstone by Charles Reade. It was made at Broadwest's Walthamstow Studios.

== Cast ==
- Gertrude McCoy as Christie Johnstone
- Stewart Rome as Viscount Ipsden
- Clive Brook as Astral Hither
- Mercy Hatton as Lady Barbara Sinclair
- J. Denton-Thompson as Wully
- Peggy Hathaway as Jean
- Adeline Hayden Coffin as Mrs. Gatty
- Gordon Craig as Charles Gatty
- Dorothy Vernon as Widow McKay
- Tom Beaumont as Saunders
