= Afraid of Love =

Afraid of Love may refer to:

- "Afraid of Love", a song by Toto on the 1982 album Toto IV
- Afraid of Love (film), a 1925 British silent drama film
