= The House with Nobody in It =

The House With Nobody in It
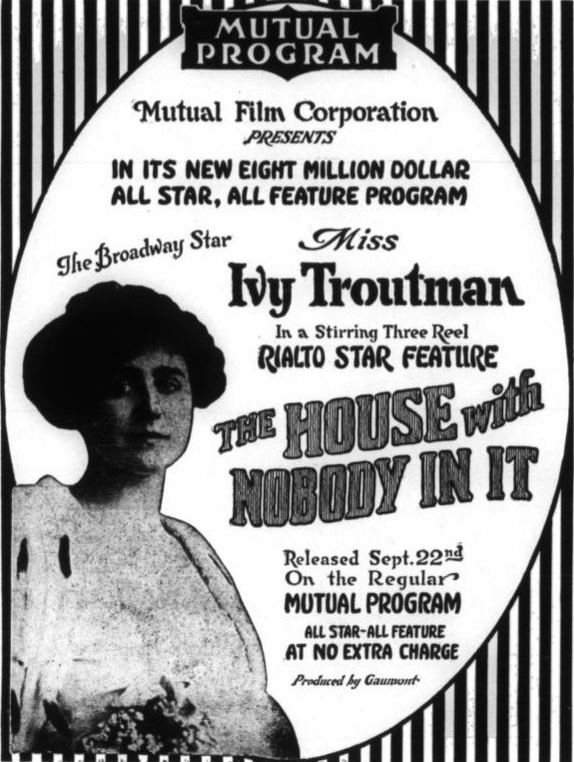
- Newspaper advertisement
- Directed by: Richard Garrick
- Written by: Clarence J. Harris
- Starring: Ivy Troutman
- Cinematography: Walter Pritchard
- Production company: Gaumont
- Distributed by: Mutual Film Corporation
- Release date: September 22, 1915
- Running time: 3 reels
- Country: United States
- Language: Silent (English intertitles)

The House with Nobody in It, also released as The House with Nobody Home, is a three-reel American silent drama film released on September 22, 1915 by Gaumont as a Rialto Star Feature and distributed by the Mutual Film Corporation. The melodrama was written by Clarence J. Harris and directed by Richard Garrick.

== Cast ==
- Ivy Troutman as Muriel Allen
- James Levering as William Allen
- Bradley Barker as Donald Bryce, a wealthy artist
- Frank Whitson as Leonard Brandos
- Charles W. Travis as Dr. Ackerly

Source: The Billboard, September 25, 1915

== Story ==
Not long after Muriel Allen and Donald Bryce are engaged to marry, her father William dies. Earlier Leonard Brandos, a suitor whose only interest in Muriel was financial, overhears William reveal to Dr. Ackerly that his wife had died insane. Leonard relays this news to Muriel who then breaks off her engagement, fearing that she will someday share the same fate as her mother.

Unable to find the fortune her father was thought to have hidden in their house, Muriel leaves town to find employment. After a series of misadventures Muriel returns home to find Leonard ransacking her father’s house in search of the elusive cache. A struggle ensues and Donald, who is on the property painting a sentimental picture of his former fiancé’s house, comes to her aid. Fate steps in though, when a bolt of lightning strikes the house, dispatches Leonard and reveals the location of her father’s treasure. The story comes full circle when a letter found within the strong box informs Muriel that she was adopted. With her mother’s sanity no longer an issue, Muriel is free to wed Donald.

== Reception ==
The play is rather trite and does not hinge correctly, but is excellently acted. The photography is good. The Billboard, September 25, 1915

Ivy Troutman, the famous Broadway star, makes her initial bow to Mutual audiences in The House with Nobody in It. In all probability no more stirring story of romance, revenge and intrigue has ever been than forms the basis of The House with Nobody in It. For her first appearance as a star of the screen Miss Troutman was furnished with an exceptionally important role, one that permits her to demonstrate the many emotional and dramatic talents with which she is gifted. Galveston Daily News, October 3, 1915
