= Trainer and Temptress =

1925 film

- Directed by: Walter West
- Production company: Astra-National
- Distributed by: Astra-National
- Release date: August 1925
- Country: United Kingdom
- Languages: Silent; English intertitles

Trainer and Temptress is a 1925 British silent sports film directed by Walter West.

== Cast ==
- Juliette Compton as Lady Maurice
- James Knight as Peter Todd
- Stephanie Stephens as Stella Jordan
- Cecil Morton York as Sir Blundell Maurice
- Sydney Seaward as Major Snazle
- Violet Graham as Madge Jordan
- Judd Green as Claud Wentworth

== See also ==
- List of films about horses

== Bibliography ==
- Low, Rachael. The History of the British Film 1918-1929. George Allen & Unwin, 1971.
