= The Lady Owner =

1924 film by Walter West

- Directed by: Walter West
- Written by: J. Bertram Brown
- Starring: Violet Hopson; James Knight; Warwick Ward; Arthur Walcott; Fred Rains; Marjorie Benson; Edwin Ellis; Jeff Barlow
- Production company: Walter West Productions
- Release date: April 1923; (UK)
- Country: United Kingdom
- Language: English

The Lady Owner is a 1923 British silent sports film directed by Walter West and starring Violet Hopson, James Knight and Warwick Ward.

== Cast ==
- Violet Hopson - Pamela Morland
- James Knight - Dick Tressider
- Warwick Ward - Morton Buckstead
- Arthur Walcott - Joe Sluggett
- Fred Rains - Sir Richard Tressider
- Marjorie Benson - Mrs. Sluggett
- Edwin Ellis - Janning Burton
- Jeff Barlow - Jenkins

== See also ==
- List of films about horses
