= A Son of David =

1920 film

- Directed by: Hay Plumb
- Written by: Benedict James; Charles Barnett
- Produced by: Walter West
- Starring: Poppy Wyndham; Ronald Colman; Arthur Walcott
- Production company: Broadwest Film Company
- Distributed by: Walter Daw and Sons
- Release date: February 1920
- Country: United Kingdom
- Language: English

A Son of David is a 1920 British silent sports film directed by Hay Plumb and starring Poppy Wyndham, Ronald Colman, and Arthur Walcott.

== Premise ==
A young Jewish boy from Whitechapel becomes a professional boxer in the hope of fighting the man he believes murdered his father.

== Cast ==
- Poppy Wyndham - Esther Raphael
- Ronald Colman - Maurice Phillips
- Arthur Walcott - Louis Raphael
- Constance Backner - Miriam Myers
- Robert Vallis - Sam Myers
- Joseph Pacey - Maurice, as a child
- Vesta Sylva - Esther as a child

== Preservation status ==
A Son of David is now considered a lost film.

== See also ==
- List of lost films
