= Beautiful Kitty =

1923 British film by Walter West

- Directed by: Walter West
- Written by: J. Bertram Brown
- Produced by: Walter West
- Starring: Violet Hopson; James Knight; Robert Vallis
- Production company: Walter West Productions
- Distributed by: Butcher's Film Service
- Release date: July 1923
- Country: United Kingdom
- Languages: Silent; English intertitles

Beautiful Kitty is a 1923 British silent sports film directed by Walter West and starring Violet Hopson, James Knight and Robert Vallis.

== Cast ==
- Violet Hopson as Kitty
- James Knight as Jim Bennett
- Robert Vallis as Alf Briggs
- Arthur Walcott
- Polly Emery
- Fred Percy

== Critical reception ==
Allmovie called it a "drab British comedy."

== See also ==
- List of films about horses

== Bibliography ==
- Low, Rachael. The History of the British Film 1918-1929. George Allen & Unwin, 1971.
