= In Full Cry (film) =

1921 film

- Directed by: Einar Bruun
- Written by: Richard Marsh (novel); Benedict James; Frank Powell
- Produced by: Walter West
- Starring: Gregory Scott; Pauline Peters; Cecil Mannering
- Production company: Broadwest
- Distributed by: Walturdaw
- Release date: March 1921
- Country: United Kingdom
- Languages: Silent; English intertitles

In Full Cry is a 1921 British silent drama film directed by Einar Bruun and starring Gregory Scott, Pauline Peters and Cecil Mannering.

== Cast ==
- Gregory Scott as Blaise Palhurston
- Pauline Peters as Pollie Hills
- Cecil Mannering as Bob Foster
- Philip Hewland as Frank C. Baynes
- Charles Tilson-Chowne as John Shapcott
- Stewart Rome

== Bibliography ==
- Low, Rachael. History of the British Film, 1918-1929. George Allen & Unwin, 1971.
