= Hornet's Nest (1923 film) =

1923 film

- Directed by: Walter West
- Written by: W. Courtney Rowden
- Based on: novel Hornet's Nest by Andrew Soutar
- Produced by: Walter West
- Starring: Florence Turner; Fred Wright; Nora Swinburne
- Production company: Walter West Productions
- Distributed by: Butcher's Film Service
- Release date: March 1923
- Country: United Kingdom
- Language: Silent (English intertitles)

Hornet's Nest is a 1923 British silent drama film directed by Walter West and starring Florence Turner, Fred Wright, and Nora Swinburne.

== Cast ==
- Florence Turner as Mrs. Cobb
- Fred Wright as Captain Anthony Cobb
- Nora Swinburne as Lady Rona
- James Knight as Tony Cobb
- Kathleen Vaughan as Rachael Beach
- Lewis Gilbert as Joe Beach
- Cecil Morton York as Sir Oswald
- Forbes Dawson as Leyster Craig
- Jeff Barlow as Farmer Craig
- Arthur Walcott as Dicky Truslove
- Somers Bellamy as Landlord

== Bibliography ==
- Low, Rachael. The History of the British Film 1918-1929. George Allen & Unwin, 1971.
