= In the Blood (1923 film) =

1923 film

- Directed by: Walter West
- Written by: Andrew Soutar (novel); J. Bertram Brown
- Starring: Victor McLaglen; Lilian Douglas; Cecil Morton York
- Production company: Walter West Productions
- Distributed by: Butcher's Film Service
- Release date: December 1923
- Country: United Kingdom
- Languages: Silent; English intertitles

In the Blood is a 1923 British silent sports drama film directed by Walter West and starring Victor McLaglen, Lilian Douglas and Cecil Morton York.

== Cast ==
- Victor McLaglen as Tony Crabtree
- Lilian Douglas as Marian
- Cecil Morton York as Sir James Crabtree
- Valia as Lady Crabtree
- John Gliddon as Ralph Hardy
- Arthur Walcott as Osman Shebe
- George Foley as Flemming
- Humberston Wright as Malcolm Jove
- Judd Green as Stoney Isaac
- Adeline Hayden Coffin as Dowager Lady Crabtree
- Clifford McLaglen as The Kansas Cat
- Kenneth McLaglen as The Whaler

== Bibliography ==
- Low, Rachael. The History of the British Film 1918-1929. George Allen & Unwin, 1971.
