= The Uninvited Guest (1923 film) =

1923 film

- Directed by: George Dewhurst
- Starring: Stewart Rome; Madge Stuart; Arthur Walcott
- Release date: 1923
- Language: UK
- Budget: English (Silent)

The Uninvited Guest is a 1923 British silent drama film directed by George Dewhurst and starring Stewart Rome, Madge Stuart and Arthur Walcott.

== Cast ==
- Stewart Rome – Philip Orme
- Madge Stuart – Mavis Steele
- Arthur Walcott – Spaling
- Linda Moore – Hilda
- Cecil Morton York – Felix Steele
- Leal Douglas – Baines
- Cameron Carr
