= Kissing Cup's Race (1930 film) =

1930 film

- Directed by: Castleton Knight
- Written by: Campbell Rae Brown (poem); J. Bertram Brown; Benedict James; Castleton Knight; Blanche Metcalfe
- Produced by: Castleton Knight
- Starring: Stewart Rome; Madeleine Carroll; John Stuart
- Cinematography: Basil Emmott
- Production company: Butcher's Film Service
- Distributed by: Butcher's Film Service
- Release date: November 1930
- Running time: 75 minutes
- Country: United Kingdom
- Language: English

Kissing Cup's Race is a 1930 British drama film directed and produced by Castleton Knight and starring Stewart Rome, Madeleine Carroll and John Stuart. It was written by J. Bertram Brown, Benedict James, Knight and Blanche Metcalfe, from the poem by Campbell Rae Brown. It was made at Walton Studios and was a remake of the 1920 silent film of the same title, which itself was a remake of Kissing Cup (1913).

== Preservation status ==
The British Film Institute National Archive holds a collection of ephemera and stills but no film or video materials.

== Plot ==
For impoverished Lord Jimmy Hilhoxton, his future income and marriage to Lady Molly Adair depend on the success in a big race of his two-year-old horse "Kissing-Cup". Molly's brother Rollo is tricked by the evil Lord Rattlington into fixing the race but in the end redeems himself by exchanging places with the doped jockey, and riding the "Kissing-Cup" to victory.

== Cast ==
- Stewart Rome as Lord Rattlington
- Madeleine Carroll as Lady Molly Adair
- John Stuart as Lord Jimmy Hilhoxton
- Richard Cooper as Rollo Adair
- Chili Bouchier as Gabrielle
- Moore Marriott as Joe Tricker
- J. Fisher White as Marquis of Hilhoxton
- James Knight as detective
- Gladys Hamer as maid
- Wally Patch as bookie

== Reception ==
Film Weekly wrote: "It is exhilirating film fare and generally easy to watch. This talkie version is competently made and has the advantage of an excellent cast. All of them have entered into the spirit of the picture, and play their roles with all the sincerity necessary."

The Daily Film Renter wrote: "Excellent racing melodrama, packed with material that makes for popularity and notable for its efficiency of production. Good direction and acting of familiar story, aided by excellent photography and recording. This should prove an unmistakeable box-office success."

In British Sound Films: The Studio Years 1928–1959 David Quinlan rated the film as "average", writing: "Uninspired remake."
