= 1921 in film =

This is an overview of 1921 in film, including significant events, a list of films released and notable births and deaths.

== Top-grossing films (U.S.) ==
The top nine films released in 1921 by U.S. gross are as follows:

Highest-grossing films of 1921
Rank	Title	Distributor	Domestic rentals
1	The Four Horsemen of the Apocalypse	Metro	$4,500,000
2	The Kid	First National	$2,500,000
3/4 (tie)	The Three Musketeers; The Sheik	United Artists; Paramount	$1,500,000
5	The Affairs of Anatol	Paramount	$1,191,789
6	Fool's Paradise	Paramount	$906,937
7	Forbidden Fruit	Paramount	$848,121
8	School Days	Warner Bros.	$546,000
9	Why Girls Leave Home	Warner Bros.	$410,000

== Events ==
- January 21 – The silent comedy drama The Kid, written by, produced by, directed by and starring Charlie Chaplin (in his Tramp character) – his first full-length film as a director – and featuring Jackie Coogan, is released in the United States. It is the year's second-highest-grossing film.
- March 6 – The silent epic war film The Four Horsemen of the Apocalypse, adapted for the screen by June Mathis, is released in the United States. It is the year's highest-grossing film (and the sixth-best-grossing silent film of all time), propels Rudolph Valentino to stardom and inspires a tango craze and a fashion for gaucho pants.
- July 1 – The silent crime docudrama Yan Ruisheng is the first full-length feature film made in China to be released; although commercially successful it is banned within 2 years and believed lost.
- August 29 – Broadway's first $1 million theatre, Loew's State opens.
- September 5 – Popular comedian Roscoe "Fatty" Arbuckle attends a party at the St. Francis Hotel, San Francisco, during which actress Virginia Rappe is fatally injured; although he is eventually acquitted of rape and manslaughter, the scandal derails his career.
- October 21 – George Melford's silent film The Sheik, which enhances leading actor Rudolph Valentino's international reputation as a Latin lover, is premiered in Los Angeles. Within the first year of its release, it exceeds $1 million in ticket sales.
- October 26 – The Chicago Theatre, which will be the oldest surviving French-style Baroque Revival grand movie palace, opens.
- The experimental short documentary film Manhatta is shot by painter Charles Sheeler and photographer Paul Strand in New York City.

== Notable films released in 1921 ==
United States unless stated.

=== A ===
- The Ace of Hearts, directed by Wallace Worsley, starring Lon Chaney and Leatrice Joy
- Action (lost), directed by John Ford, starring Hoot Gibson
- The Adventures of Mr. Pickwick (lost), directed by Thomas Bentley, starring Frederick Volpe – (GB)
- The Adventures of Tarzan, 15-part serial directed by Robert F. Hill and Scott Sidney, starring Elmo Lincoln
- The Affairs of Anatol, directed by Cecil B. DeMille, starring Wallace Reid and Gloria Swanson
- After Midnight, directed by Ralph Ince
- After Your Own Heart, directed by George Marshall, starring Tom Mix
- All Soul's Eve (lost), directed by Chester M. Franklin, starring Mary Miles Minter and Jack Holt, based on the 1920 stage play by Anne Crawford Flexner
- Among Those Present, directed by Fred C. Newmeyer, starring Harold Lloyd
- L'Atlantide, directed by Jacques Feyder, based on the 1919 novel by Pierre Benoit – (France)

=== B ===
- Die Bergkatze (The Wild Cat), directed by Ernst Lubitsch, starring Pola Negri and Paul Heidemann – (Germany)
- The Bigamist, starring and directed by Guy Newall with Ivy Duke – (GB)
- The Blot, directed by Lois Weber
- The Boat, directed by Edward F. Cline and Buster Keaton, starring Buster Keaton
- The Bonnie Brier Bush (lost), starring and directed by Donald Crisp – (GB)
- Brewster's Millions (lost), directed by Joseph Henabery, starring Roscoe "Fatty" Arbuckle
- Brownie's Little Venus, directed by Fred Fishback, starring Baby Peggy
- Buried Treasure, directed by George D. Baker, starring Marion Davies and Norman Kerry

=== C ===
- The Call of Youth (lost), directed by Hugh Ford
- Camille, directed by Ray C. Smallwood, starring Alla Nazimova and Rudolph Valentino
- The Case of Becky, directed by Chester M. Franklin, starring Constance Binney, based on the 1912 stage play by David Belasco and Edward Locke
- A Connecticut Yankee in King Arthur's Court (lost), directed by Emmett J. Flynn
- The Conquering Power, directed by Rex Ingram, starring Rudolph Valentino and Alice Terry

=== D ===
- Desire (Sehnsucht) (lost), directed by F. W. Murnau, starring Conrad Veidt – (Germany)
- Destiny (Der müde Tod), directed by Fritz Lang, starring Lil Dagover and Rudolf Klein-Rogge – (Germany)
- The Devil, directed by James Young, starring George Arliss, based on the 1908 stage play by Ferenc Molnár
- Disraeli (lost), directed by Henry Kolker, starring George Arliss
- The Dollar-a-Year Man (lost), directed by James Cruze, starring Roscoe "Fatty" Arbuckle

=== E ===
- El Capullo Marchito, directed by José Nepomuceno – (Philippines)
- El Dorado, directed by Marcel L'Herbier – (France)
- Enchantment, directed by Robert G. Vignola, starring Marion Davies
- Experience (lost), directed by George Fitzmaurice, starring Richard Barthelmess

=== F ===
- The Fire Eater, directed by B. Reeves Eason, starring Hoot Gibson
- Fool's Paradise, directed by Cecil B. DeMille, starring Conrad Nagel and Mildred Harris
- Forever (lost), directed by George Fitzmaurice, starring Elsie Ferguson and Wallace Reid
- The Four Feathers, directed by René Plaissetty – (GB)
- The Four Horsemen of the Apocalypse, directed by Rex Ingram, starring Rudolph Valentino

=== G ===
- The Goat, directed by Mal St. Clair and Buster Keaton, starring Buster Keaton
- The Ghost in the Garret (lost), directed by F. Richard Jones, starring Dorothy Gish
- Godfather Death (Der Gevatter Tod), directed by Heinz Hanus, based on the 1884 short story Der Pate des Todes by Rudolf Baumbach – (Austria)
- Das grinsende Gesicht (transl. The Grinning Face), directed by Julius Herska, based on the 1869 novel The Man Who Laughs by Victor Hugo – (Austria)
- The Gunsaulus Mystery (lost), written and directed by Oscar Micheaux

=== H ===
- Hail the Woman, directed by John Griffith Wray, starring Florence Vidor
- The Haunted Castle (Schloß Vogelöd), directed by F. W. Murnau, based on the novel by Rudolf Stratz – (Germany)
- The Haunted House, directed by Edward F. Cline and Buster Keaton, starring Buster Keaton
- The High Sign, directed by Edward F. Cline and Buster Keaton, starring Buster Keaton
- His Brother's Keeper (lost), directed by Wilfrid North
- L'Homme qui vendit son âme au diable (The Man Who Sold His Soul to the Devil), directed by Pierre Caron – (France)
- The Hound of the Baskervilles, directed by Maurice Elvey, starring Eille Norwood – (GB)
- Humor Risk (unreleased), directed by Dick Smith, starring the Marx Brothers

=== I ===
- The Idle Class, a Charles Chaplin short
- The Indian Tomb (Das Indische Grabmal), directed by Joe May, starring Conrad Veidt – (Germany)
- The Island of the Lost (Die Insel der Verschollenen), directed by Urban Gad, based on the 1896 novel The Island of Doctor Moreau by H. G. Wells without authorization – (Germany)

=== J ===
- Jane Eyre, directed by Hugo Ballin, starring Norman Trevor and Mabel Ballin, based on the 1847 novel by Charlotte Brontë
- Jánošík, directed by Jaroslav Jerry Siakeľ – (Czechoslovakia)
- Jim the Penman, directed by Kenneth Webb, starring Lionel Barrymore
- Journey into the Night (Der Gang in die Nacht), directed by F. W. Murnau – (Germany)

=== K ===
- The Kid, a Charlie Chaplin film, with Jackie Coogan
- Kipps, directed by Harold M. Shaw, starring George K. Arthur, based on the 1905 novel by H. G. Wells

=== L ===
- Land of My Fathers directed by Fred Rains, starring John Stuart – (GB)
- Leaves from Satan's Book (Blade af Satans Bog), directed by Carl Theodor Dreyer – (Denmark)
- Little Lord Fauntleroy, directed by Alfred E. Green and Jack Pickford, starring Mary Pickford
- The Lost Shadow (Der Verlorene Schatten) (lost), directed by Rochus Gliese, starring Paul Wegener – (Germany)
- The Lotus Eater (lost), directed by Marshall Neilan, starring John Barrymore and Colleen Moore
- The Love Light, directed by Frances Marion, starring Mary Pickford
- Lucky Carson (lost), directed by Wilfrid North, starring Earle Williams
- The Lucky Dog, directed by Jess Robbins, starring Stan Laurel and Oliver Hardy

=== M ===
- Mathias Sandorf, directed by Henri Fescourt, starring Romuald Joubé – (France)
- The Mechanical Man (L'uomo meccanico) (lost), starring and directed by André Deed – (Italy)
- A Message From Mars, directed by Maxwell Karger, starring Bert Lytell
- A Midnight Bell (lost), starring and directed by Charles Ray, based on the 1889 stage play by Charles H. Hoyt
- Miss Lulu Bett, directed by William C. deMille, starring Lois Wilson and Milton Sills
- Il mostro di Frankenstein (The Monster of Frankenstein) (lost), directed by Eugenio Testa – (Italy)

=== N ===
- Never Weaken, directed by Fred C. Newmeyer and Sam Taylor, starring Harold Lloyd
- The Nut, directed by Theodore Reed, starring Douglas Fairbanks and Marguerite De La Motte

=== O ===
- The Offenders (lost), directed by Fenwicke Holmes
- Orphans of the Storm, directed by D. W. Griffith, starring Lillian Gish and Dorothy Gish
- The Other Person (Onder spiritistischen dwang), directed by Maurits Binger and B. E. Doxat-Pratt, based on the 1920 novel by Fergus Hume – (Netherlands/GB)

=== P ===
- The Painting of Osvaldo Mars (Il quadro di Osvaldo Mars), directed by Guido Brignone, starring Mercedes Brignone – (Italy)
- Pan Twardowski, directed by Wiktor Biegański – (Poland)
- The Passion Flower, directed by Herbert Brenon, starring Norma Talmadge
- Peck's Bad Boy, directed by Sam Wood, starring Jackie Coogan
- The Phantom Carriage (aka Korkarlen/ The Wagoner), directed by Victor Sjostrom, starring Sjostrom, Hilda Borgstrom and Tore Svennberg, based on the 1912 novel Thy Soul Shall Bear Witness! by Selma Lagerlof; this film influenced the later works of Ingmar Bergman – (Sweden)
- The Playhouse, directed by Edward F. Cline and Buster Keaton, starring Buster Keaton

=== Q ===
- The Queen of Sheba (lost), directed by J. Gordon Edwards, starring Betty Blythe

=== S ===
- A Sailor-Made Man, directed by Fred C. Newmeyer, starring Harold Lloyd
- School Days, directed by William Nigh, starring Wesley Barry
- Sentimental Tommy (lost), directed by John S. Robertson, starring Gareth Hughes
- Seven Years Bad Luck, a Max Linder film
- The Sheik, directed by George Melford, starring Agnes Ayres and Rudolph Valentino
- The Silver Lining, directed by Roland West, starring Jewel Carmen
- The Sky Pilot, directed by King Vidor, starring Colleen Moore
- Soul of the Cypress, directed by Dudley Murphy
- Squibs, directed by George Pearson, starring Betty Balfour – (GB)
- Sybil (lost), directed by Jack Denton, starring Evelyn Brent – (GB)

=== T ===
- The Three Musketeers, directed by Fred Niblo, starring Douglas Fairbanks
- Through the Back Door, directed by Alfred E. Green and Jack Pickford, starring Mary Pickford
- Tol'able David, directed by Henry King, starring Richard Barthelmess
- Les Trois Mousquetaires (The Three Musketeers), directed by Henri Diamant-Berger – (France)

=== W ===
- Whispering Shadows, directed by Émile Chautard
- White and Unmarried (lost), directed by Tom Forman, starring Thomas Meighan
- Why Girls Leave Home (lost), directed by William Nigh, starring Anna Q. Nilsson
- The Witching Hour, directed by William Desmond Taylor, starring Elliott Dexter, adapted from the 1907 stage play by Augustus Thomas
- Woman's Place, directed by Victor Fleming, starring Constance Talmadge
- The Wonderful Thing, directed by Herbert Brenon, starring Norma Talmadge and Harrison Ford

== Comedy film series ==
- Harold Lloyd (1913–1938)
- Charlie Chaplin (1914–1940)
- Lupino Lane (1915–1939)
- Buster Keaton (1917–1944)

== Animated short film series ==
- Aesop's Film Fables (1921–1934)
- Felix the Cat (1919–1936)
- Koko the Clown (1919–1963)

== Births ==
- January 3 – John Russell, actor (died 1991)
- January 10 - George Robotham, American stuntman and actor (died 2007)
- January 11 - Kathleen Byron, English actress (died 2009)
- January 17 - Herb Ellis, American character actor (died 2018)
- January 26 – Elisabeth Kirkby, British-born Australian actress, producer and director (died 2026)
- January 27 – Donna Reed, actress (died 1986)
- January 31
  - Carol Channing, musical actress (died 2019)
  - Mario Lanza, singer and actor (died 1959)
- February 1 – Peter Sallis, actor (died 2017)
- February 8 – Lana Turner, actress (died 1995)
- February 16 – Vera-Ellen, actress, dancer (died 1981)
- February 19 – Ann Savage, actress (died 2008)
- February 22 – Giulietta Masina, actress (died 1994)
- February 24 – Abe Vigoda, actor (died 2016)
- February 26 – Betty Hutton, actress (died 2007)
- March 1 - Jack Clayton, British director and producer (died 1995)
- March 3 – Diana Barrymore, actress (died 1960)
- March 4 – Joan Greenwood, actress (died 1987)
- March 5 - Jo de Winter, American actress (died 2016)
- March 8 – Alan Hale Jr., actor, restaurateur (died 1990)
- March 10
  - Josip Elic, American actor (died 2019)
  - Charlotte Zucker, actress, mother of Jerry Zucker and David Zucker (died 2007)
- March 12 – Gordon MacRae, actor, singer (died 1986)
- March 21 - Logan Ramsey, American character actor (died 2000)
- March 23 – Geoffrey Chater, English actor (died 2021)
- March 25
  - Nancy Kelly, American actress (died 1995)
  - Simone Signoret, French actress (died 1985)
- March 26 – Julie Harris, English costume designer (died 2015)
- March 28 – Dirk Bogarde, English actor (died 1999)
- April 1 – Arieh Elias, Israeli actor (died 2015)
- April 3 – Jan Sterling, American actress (died 2004)
- April 4 - Elizabeth Wilson, American actress (died 2015)
- April 7 – Bill Butler, American cinematographer (died 2023)
- April 10 – Chuck Connors, American actor (died 1992)
- April 16 – Peter Ustinov, British actor (died 2004)
- April 23
  - Janet Blair, American actress (died 2007)
  - Gerald Campion, English actor (died 2002)
- April 29 – Tommy Noonan, American actor, screenwriter, producer (died 1968)
- May 2 – Satyajit Ray, Indian filmmaker (died 1992)
- May 16 - Harry Carey Jr., American actor (died 2012)
- May 23
  - Grigori Chukhrai, Ukrainian film director (died 2001)
  - Ray Lawler, Australian actor (died 2024)
- May 29 - Elizabeth Kelly, British actress (died 2025)
- May 30 - Jamie Uys, South African film director (died 1996)
- May 31 – Alida Valli, actress (died 2006)
- June 8
  - Sheila Ryan, actress (died 1975)
  - Alexis Smith, actress (died 1993)
- June 18 – Wesley Lau, actor (died 1984)
- June 19 – Louis Jourdan, actor (died 2015)
- June 21
  - Judy Holliday, born Judith Tuvim, actress (died 1965)
  - Jane Russell, actress (died 2011)
- July 2 - Maria Britneva, Russian-British actress (died 1994)
- July 3 – Susan Peters, actress (died 1952)
- July 5 – Patricia Wright, American actress
- July 6
  - Nancy Reagan, born Anne Robbins, actress and First Lady of the United States (died 2016)
  - Bill Shirley, American actor and singer (died 1989)
- July 10 – Jeff Donnell, American actress (died 1988)
- July 17 – František Zvarík, Slovak actor (died 2008)
- July 21 - Al Checco, American actor (died 2015)
- July 23 – Robert Brown, actor (died 2003)
- July 25 – Nan Grey, actress (died 1993)
- August 3 – Marilyn Maxwell, actress (died 1972)
- August 8 – Esther Williams, actress, swimmer (died 2013)
- August 11 - Tad Horino, American actor (died 2002)
- August 19
  - Pasquale Cajano, Italian-American actor (died 2000)
  - Gene Roddenberry, screenwriter and producer (died 1991)
- August 28 – Nancy Kulp, actress, comedienne (died 1991)
- September 8 – Harry Secombe, actor, singer (died 2001)
- September 15 - James Jeter, American actor (died 2007)
- September 27 – Miklós Jancsó, Hungarian director (died 2014)
- September 30 – Deborah Kerr, actress (died 2007)
- October 1 - James Whitmore, American actor (died 2009)
- October 5 - Nikolay Dupak, Soviet-Russian actor (died 2023)
- October 12 - Kenneth Griffith, Welsh actor and documentary filmmaker (died 2006)
- October 13 – Yves Montand, singer, actor (died 1991)
- November 3 – Charles Bronson, actor (died 2003)
- November 5 – Moritz Yomtov, screenwriter (died 1992)
- November 8 – Walter Mirisch, American film producer (died 2023)
- November 12 - Paul Maxwell, Canadian actor (died 1991)
- November 14 - Brian Keith, American actor (died 1997)
- November 21 – Vivian Blaine, actor, singer (died 1995)
- November 22 – Rodney Dangerfield, actor, comedian (died 2004)
- November 23 – Fred Buscaglione, Italian actor and singer (died 1960)
- December 1 - Sylvia Kauders, American actress (died 2016)
- December 4 – Deanna Durbin, actress (died 2013)
- December 11 - Liz Smith, English character actress (died 2016)
- December 15 - Nikolai Lebedev, Soviet-Russian actor (died 2022)
- December 20 - George Roy Hill, American director (died 2002)
- December 21 - Ralph Manza, American character actor (died 2000)
- December 24 - Mickey Knox, American actor (died 2013)
- December 26
  - Steve Allen, actor, composer, comedian, author (died 2000)
  - Sean Sullivan, Canadian actor (died 1985)

== Deaths ==
- February 8 – George Formby Sr, 45, British music hall entertainer who appeared in one film (pulmonary tuberculosis)
- May 17 – Karl Mantzius, 61, Danish actor, theatre director, writer
- June 5 – Georges Feydeau, 58, French playwright, many of whose plays were adapted for the screen (syphilis)
- June 11 - Frank R. Mills, 50, American stage and screen actor
- June 20 – George Loane Tucker, 49, American actor, screenwriter and director
- July 9 – Robert Broderick, 56, American stage and film actor
- September 9 – Virginia Rappe, 30, American actress
- September 17 – Van Dyke Brooke, 62, American actor, screenwriter and film director

== Film debuts ==
- Richard Arlen – Ladies Must Live
- George Arliss – The Devil
- Mary Astor – Bullets or Ballots
- George Bancroft – The Journey's End
- Leslie Banks – Experience
- Anna-Lisa Baude – The Phantom Carriage
- Annette Benson – Squibs
- Helga Brofeldt – The Phantom Carriage
- Louis Calhern – What's Worth While?
- Harry Carey Jr. – Desperate Trails
- Rina De Liguoro – La principessa Bebè
- Renée Devillers – L'affaire du train 24
- Billie Dove – Get-Rich-Quick Wallingford
- Robert English – The Four Feathers
- Willy Fritsch – Miss Venus
- Camilla Horn – Kean
- Selmer Jackson – The Supreme Passion
- Roger Livesey – The Four Feathers
- Carole Lombard – A Perfect Crime
- Fredric March – The Great Adventure
- Patsy Ruth Miller – One a Minute
- Mary Philbin – The Blazing Trail
- Eddie Phillips – The Love Light
- Basil Rathbone – Innocent
- George Regas – The Love Light
- Dorothy Revier – Life's Greatest Question
- Frances Robinson – Orphans of the Storm
- Rosa Rosanova – Just Around the Corner
- Athene Seyler – The Adventures of Mr. Pickwick
- Lilyan Tashman – Experience
- Fred Thomson – The Love Light
- Coy Watson Jr. – While the Devil Laughs
- Drusilla Wills – The Old Wives' Tale
