= Her Penalty =

1921 film

- Directed by: Einar Bruun
- Written by: Benedict James; Eliot Stannard
- Produced by: Walter West
- Starring: Stewart Rome; Pauline Peters; Clive Brook
- Production company: Broadwest
- Distributed by: Walturdaw
- Release date: January 1921
- Country: United Kingdom
- Languages: Silent; English intertitles

Her Penalty is a 1921 British silent drama film directed by Einar Bruun and starring Stewart Rome, Pauline Peters and Clive Brook.

== Cast ==
- Stewart Rome as James Fenwick
- Pauline Peters as Vera Trenchard
- Clive Brook as Robert Trenchard
- Philip Hewland as Arthur Winterby

== Bibliography ==
- Low, Rachael. History of the British Film, 1918-1929. George Allen & Unwin, 1971.
