= Wimbledon Studios =

Wimbledon Film & Television Studios

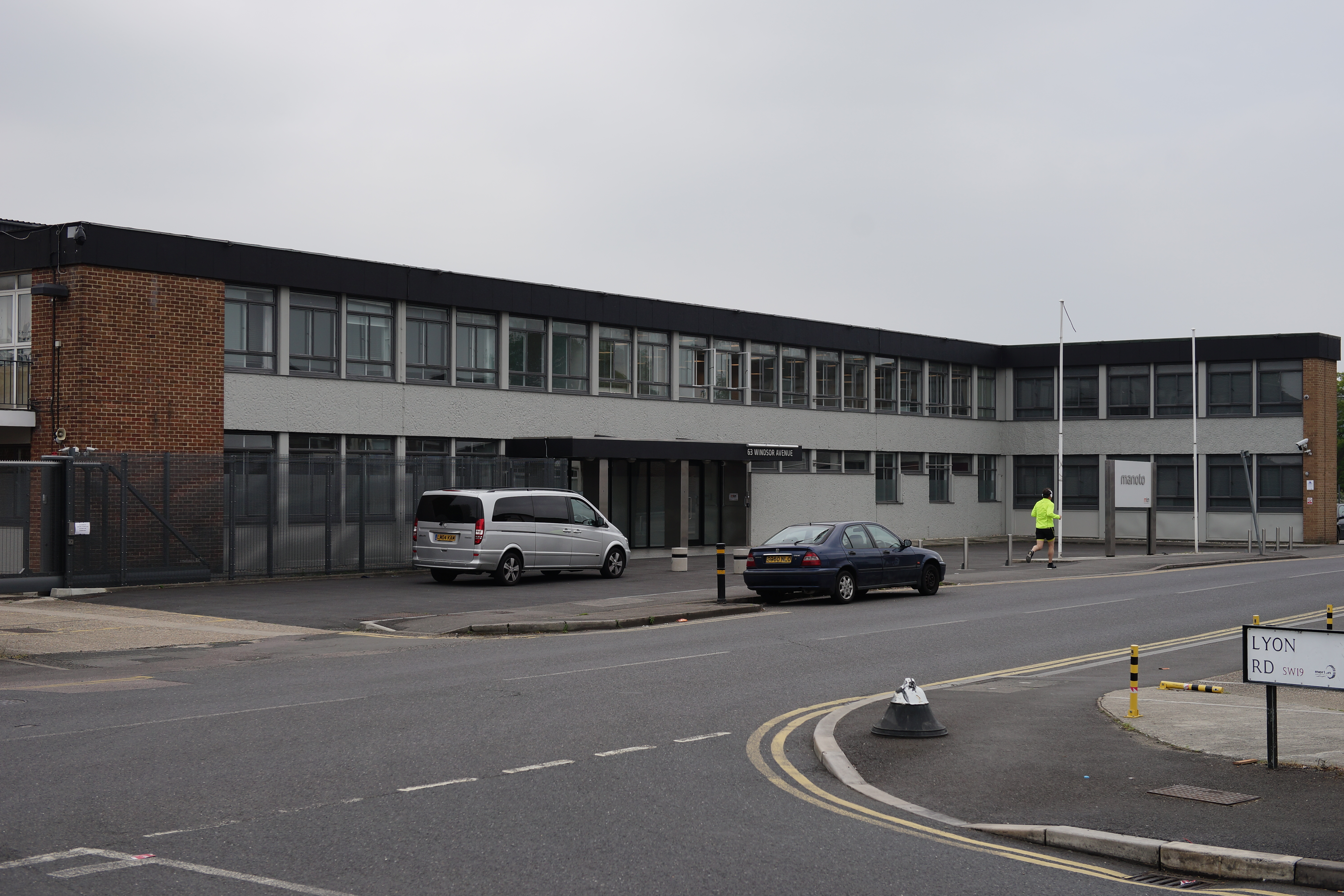
- Wimbledon Studios in May 2017

Project
- Owner: Marjan Television Network Ltd
- Website: www.wimbledonstudios.london

Location
- Interactive map of Wimbledon Studios
- Coordinates: 51.4104°N 0.1865°W
- Address: 1 Deer Park Road; London, SW19; United Kingdom

Wimbledon Film & Television Studios is an English film and television production company and facilities provider, located in Colliers Wood, between Mitcham and Wimbledon in south London.

== History ==
Wimbledon Studios was established as the Merton Studios. The studios were previously a wine-distribution warehouse, which was acquired by Thames Television as a replacement for their Barlby Road base in North Kensington in the early 1990s.

The studios were also used for the Channel 5 soap opera Family Affairs, which was produced by Thames and had moved from a site in Hayes. An exterior street set was built for the programme, which has also since been used by other productions and is available for hire.

Thames – which later became Talkback Thames – stayed at the studios until 2010 when The Bill, by then the only show produced there, ended.

After the cancellation of The Bill by ITV, Talkback Thames's owners, FremantleMedia, sold the studios. Panther Securities Plc purchased the site for £4.75 million in September 2010 and set up Wimbledon Film & Television Studios in October 2010, to provide a new production facility to the film and television industry.

The facility has three studios: two large studios of approximately 8,000 square feet (740 m^{2}) and one 5,000-square-foot studio.

In August 2014, it was announced that Wimbledon Studios had entered administration with several employees being made redundant as a result.

Marjan TV network currently holds the lease on the building

Enquiries for studio hire are handled by The Location Collective.

== Studios ==
- Studio 1 (7690 sq ft, 29 ft height clearance)
- Studio 2 (8160 sq ft, 29 ft height clearance)

== Free-standing sets ==
- Street set (Cheryl Cole's Under the Sun music video; Derren Brown: Apocalypse trailer)
- The Common Inn pub set (Dizzee Rascal - Bassline Junkie, David Brent - Equality Street)

== Production history ==
- The Iron Lady (feature film)
- Tipping Point (ITV1)
- Episodes (Series 2 & 3; BBC2)
- Spy (Series 1 & 2; Sky1)
- I'm a Celebrity...Get Me Out of Here (ITV1)
- An Adventure in Space and Time (Doctor Who special; BBC)
- Silk (BBC1)
- Big School (BBC1)
- David Brent - Equality Street for Comic Relief (BBC1)
- Gangsta Granny (BBC1)
- Only Fools & Horses Sports Relief 2014 Special (BBC1)
- Inside No. 9 (BBC2)
- Misfits (E4)
- Russell Howard's Good News Sketches (BBC3)
- Murder in Successville (BBC3)
- This Is Jinsy (Series 2)
- Bad Education (Series 2; BBC3)
- The Angel (Sky1)
- World Series of Dating (BBC3)
- Nixon's the One (Sky Arts)
- Starlings (Sky1)
- "Some Girls" (BBC3)
- Anna and Katy (Channel 4)
- Roger & Val Have Just Got In (BBC2)
- Watson & Oliver (BBC3)
- Cardinal Burns (E4)
- Pride (feature film)
- Junk (BBC)

== See also ==
- Cinema of the United Kingdom
- List of British film studios
- Television in the United Kingdom
