= What Price Loving Cup? =

1923 film

- Directed by: Walter West
- Written by: Campbell Rae Brown; J. Bertram Brown
- Starring: Violet Hopson; James Knight; James Lindsay
- Production company: Walter West Productions
- Distributed by: Butcher's Film Service
- Release date: October 1923
- Country: United Kingdom
- Languages: Silent; English intertitles

What Price Loving Cup? is a 1923 British silent sports film directed by Walter West and starring Violet Hopson, James Knight and James Lindsay.

== Cast ==
- Violet Hopson as Lady Lorimer
- James Knight as Philip Denham
- James Lindsay as Sir John Lorimer
- Marjorie Benson as Tony Sheldon
- Cecil Morton York as Earl of Dalmore
- Arthur Walcott as Manager
- Bob Vallis as Hireling
- James Strackey as Trainer

== See also ==
- List of films about horses

== Bibliography ==
- Low, Rachael. The History of the British Film 1918-1929. George Allen & Unwin, 1971.
