= The Great Turf Mystery =

1924 film

- Directed by: Walter West
- Written by: J. Bertram Brown
- Starring: Violet Hopson; James Knight; Warwick Ward
- Production company: Walter West Productions
- Distributed by: Butcher's Film Service
- Release date: January 1924
- Country: United Kingdom
- Languages: Silent; English intertitles

The Great Turf Mystery is a 1924 British silent sports film directed by Walter West and starring Violet Hopson, James Knight and Warwick Ward. Like many of West's films it has a horseracing theme.

== Cast ==
- Violet Hopson as Sheila Donovan
- James Knight as Luke Pomeroy
- Warwick Ward as Frank Pomeroy
- Marjorie Benson as Maisie
- Arthur Walcott as Mark Goodman
- M. Evans as James Goodman

== Bibliography ==
- Low, Rachel. The History of British Film: Volume IV, 1918–1929. Routledge, 1997.
