= Was She Justified? =

1922 film

- Directed by: Walter West
- Written by: Andrew Soutar (play); Maude Williamson (play)
- Starring: Florence Turner; Ivy Close; Lewis Gilbert
- Production company: Walter West Productions
- Distributed by: Butcher's Film Service
- Release date: November 1922
- Country: United Kingdom
- Languages: Silent; English intertitles

Was She Justified? is a 1922 British silent drama film directed by Walter West and starring Florence Turner, Ivy Close and Lewis Gilbert.

== Cast ==
- Florence Turner as Joan Crossby
- Ivy Close
- Lewis Gilbert as John Crossby
- Arthur Walcott as Robert Quidman
- George Bellamy
- Jeff Barlow
- Gwen Dickens
- John Reid
- Leonard Upton

== Bibliography ==
- Low, Rachael. The History of the British Film 1918-1929. George Allen & Unwin, 1971.
