= The Penniless Millionaire =

1921 film

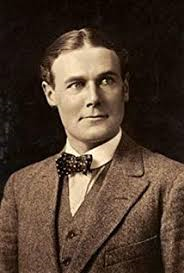
- Directed by: Einar Bruun
- Written by: David Christie Murray (novel); J. Frank Powell
- Produced by: Walter West
- Starring: Stewart Rome; Fabienne Fabrèges; Gregory Scott
- Production company: Broadwest
- Distributed by: Walturdaw
- Release date: September 1921
- Country: United Kingdom
- Languages: Silent; English intertitles

The Penniless Millionaire is a 1921 British silent drama film directed by Einar Bruun and starring Stewart Rome, Fabienne Fabrèges and Gregory Scott.

== Cast ==
- Stewart Rome as Bernard Jarrold
- Fabienne Fabrèges as Angela Jarrold
- Gregory Scott as Belthorp
- Cameron Carr as Tim Dolan
- George Foley as Martin Stornaway

== Bibliography ==
- Low, Rachael. History of the British Film, 1918-1929. George Allen & Unwin, 1971.
