= Kissing Cup's Race (1920 film) =

1920 film

- Directed by: Walter West
- Written by: Campbell Rae Brown (poem); J. Bertram Brown; Benedict James
- Starring: Violet Hopson; Gregory Scott; Clive Brook
- Production company: Hopson Productions
- Distributed by: Butcher's Film Service
- Release date: 1920
- Country: United Kingdom
- Language: English

Kissing Cup's Race is a 1920 British silent sports film directed by Walter West and starring Violet Hopson, Gregory Scott and Clive Brook. It was written by J. Bertram Brown and Benedict James based on the poem Kissing Cup's Race by Campbell Rae Brown. The story had previously been filmed as Kissing Cup (1913), and was again filmed in 1930 as the talkie Kissing Cup's Race.

== Cast ==
- Violet Hopson as Constance Medley
- Gregory Scott as Lord Hilhoxton
- Clive Brook as Lord Rattlington
- Arthur Walcott as John Wood
- Philip Hewland as Vereker
- Adeline Hayden Coffin as Lady Corrington
- Joe Plant as Bob Doon

== Reception ==
The Bioscope described the film at the time as "probably the most exciting British racing film yet produced". In a slightly later review they said "The story is not complicated with the usual thrilling adventures, but nor has it the simplicity of Campbell Rae Brown's famous recitation; while many of the details are even less convincing than in the average turf drama. It is only in the technique of the racing scenes that there is any exceptional skill".
