= A Daughter of Love =

1925 British film by Walter West

- Directed by: Walter West
- Written by: E.J. Key (novel); Lucita Squier
- Production company: Stoll Pictures
- Distributed by: Stoll Pictures
- Release date: February 1925
- Country: United Kingdom
- Languages: Silent; English intertitles

A Daughter of Love is a 1925 British silent drama film directed by Walter West and starring Violet Hopson, John Stuart and Jameson Thomas.

== Cast ==
- Violet Hopson as Mary Tannerhill
- John Stuart as Dudley Bellairs
- Jameson Thomas as Dr. Eden Brent
- Fred Raynham as Lord St. Erth
- Arthur Walcott as Mr. Tannerhill
- Ena Evans as Lillian
- Gladys Mason as Lady St. Erth
- Madge Tree as Mrs. Tobin
- Minna Grey as Mrs. Diamond
- Mrs. Charles Beattie as Mrs. Korsikov

== Bibliography ==
- Low, Rachael. The History of the British Film 1918-1929. George Allen & Unwin, 1971.
