= The Case of Lady Camber (film) =

1920 British film by Walter West

- Original British 2-Sheet Poster
- Directed by: Walter West
- Written by: Horace Annesley Vachell (play); Benedict James
- Starring: Violet Hopson; Stewart Rome; Gregory Scott
- Production company: Broadwest
- Distributed by: Walturdaw Co. Ltd. (UK)
- Release date: August 1920 (UK)
- Country: United Kingdom
- Languages: Silent; English intertitles

The Case of Lady Camber is a 1920 British silent mystery film directed by Walter West and starring Violet Hopson, Stewart Rome and Gregory Scott. Lord Camber comes under suspicion of murdering his wife, an ex-chorus girl. It was adapted from a 1915 play of the same title by Horace Annesley Vachell. It was made at Walthamstow Studios.

== Cast ==
- Violet Hopson as Esther Yorke
- Stewart Rome as Dr. Harley Napier
- Gregory Scott as Lord Camber
- Mercy Hatton as Lady Camber
- C. M. Hallard as Sir Bedford Slufter
- Polly Emery as Peach
