= Adeline Hayden Coffin =

German-born British actress (1862–1939)

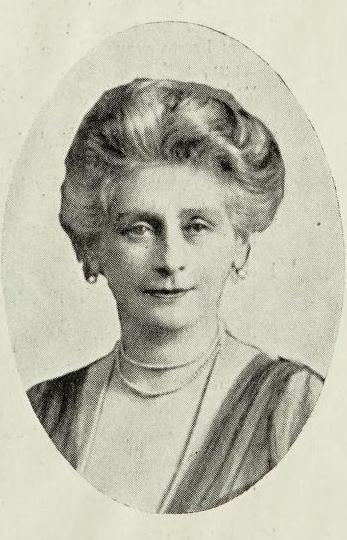
- Hayden Coffin from a 1922 publication
- Born: Adeline Maria Elisabeth de Leuw; 20 June 1862; Gräfrath, North Rhine-Westphalia, Germany
- Died: March 31, 1939 (aged 76); Kensington, London
- Spouses: Alberto Randegger, Hayden Coffin

Adeline Maria Elisabeth Hayden Coffin (née de Leuw; 20 June 1862 – 31 March 1939) was a German-born British actress. In an advertisement for her professional availability in 1921 she described herself, or was described by her agent, as suitable for "Sympathetic Mothers, Grandes Dames, and Character Parts".

== Life ==
Hayden Coffin was born in Gräfrath (Gut Grünewald, nowadays part of Solingen in North Rhine-Westphalia), Germany, daughter of Friedrich-August de Leuw, a landscape painter, and Mary Francis Charrington. She was the granddaughter of the oculist Friedrich-Hermann de Leuw.

Hayden Coffin was a pupil of the composer Alberto Randegger, and married him in 1884 in London. She had worked as a pianist, and taught singing. They were divorced in 1892. Adeline had originally petitioned for a divorce on the grounds that Randegger was cruel to her and that he had been unfaithful. The Solicitor general and the judge in the case found that there was no truth in this, but that in fact Adeline had left her husband and gone to live with the actor Charles Hayden Coffin, who had also been a pupil of Randegger. The divorce was granted on the grounds of Adeline's adultery. She married Hayden Coffin in the same year. Adeline Hayden Coffin died in Kensington, London at age 76.

As well as acting, she also translated a play, Lady Tetley's Divorce (later filmed in English as Lady Tetley's Decree), from English to German; it was produced at the Royalty Theatre in 1904.

== Critical response ==
The Kinematograph and Lantern Weekly wrote that in A Little Child Shall Lead Them, "Adeline Hayden-Coffin is responsible for a coldly perfect study of an ambitious mother". In another article they called her "a Unique Personality" and said "Adeline Hayden-Coffin is much in demand with British film companies, owing to her unique gifts of characterisation. She is the grande dame par excellence of the British screen and in this respect occupies the same position with regard to the film that Rose Leclercq some years ago held in connection with the stage". The writer said that Hayden Coffin could play both aristocratic and working-class characters.

The Bioscope wrote that in Kissing Cup's Race (1920) Hayden Coffin was "excellent, as always, in the role of Constance's somewhat worldly mama". In a review of the same film a couple of weeks later they said that "Adeline Hayden Coffin acts with her usual refinement and art, but has not much to act". The same paper listed Hayden Coffin in 1924 as one of "several well-known players" appearing in The Flying Fifty-Five.

In 1925, The Kinematograph Weekly, reviewing Afraid of Love, called her a "reliable player". In 1928, the same paper, reviewing The Guns of Loos, said that "Adeline Hayden-Coffin, whose appearances on the British screen are all too infrequent, is the English mother - around whose daughter the story revolves".

== Activism ==
Hayden Coffin was on the committee of Our Dumb Friends League and promoted animal rights.

== Selected filmography ==
- The Manxman (1917)
- A Romany Lass (1918)
- God's Clay (1919)
- After Many Days (1919)
- The Power of Right (1919)
- The Knave of Hearts (1919)
- The Call of the Road (1920)
- The Black Spider (1920)
- Kissing Cup's Race (1920)
- A Sportsman's Wife (1921)
- Christie Johnstone (1921)
- The Great Day (1921)
- The Bonnie Brier Bush (1921)
- Tell Your Children (1922)
- The Scarlet Lady (1922)
- The Prodigal Son (1923)
- This Freedom (1923)
- Bonnie Prince Charlie (1923)
- Don Quixote (1923)
- In the Blood (1923)
- The Alley of Golden Hearts (1924)
- The Love Story of Aliette Brunton (1924)
- White Slippers (1924)
- The Flying Fifty-Five (1924)
- Afraid of Love (1925)
- The Woman Tempted (1926)
- The Triumph of the Rat (1926)
- The Guns of Loos (1928)
- The Burgomaster of Stilemonde (1929)
- Other People's Sins (1931)
