= Cecil Morton York =

British actor (1857–1935)

Cecil Morton York (29 April 1857 – 23 February 1935) was a British actor of the silent era.

Born Cecil Morton Smith in Kensington, West London, UK, he died at age 77 in Denville Hall, Northwood, London.

== Selected filmography ==
- Flying from Justice (1915)
- Disraeli (1916)
- Beau Brocade (1916)
- The Key of the World (1918)
- The First Men In The Moon (1919) as the Grand Lunar
- Pallard the Punter (1919)
- The Autumn of Pride (1921)
- The God in the Garden (1921)
- Trapped by the Mormons (1922)
- A Sister to Assist 'Er (1922)
- A Gamble with Hearts (1923)
- The Starlit Garden (1923)
- Hornet's Nest (1923)
- In the Blood (1923)
- What Price Loving Cup? (1923)
- Lights of London (1923)
- Young Lochinvar (1923)
- The Uninvited Guest (1923)
- Old Bill Through the Ages (1924)
- The Alley of Golden Hearts (1924)
- What the Butler Saw (1924)
- Trainer and Temptress (1925)
