= Ivy Troutman =

American actress

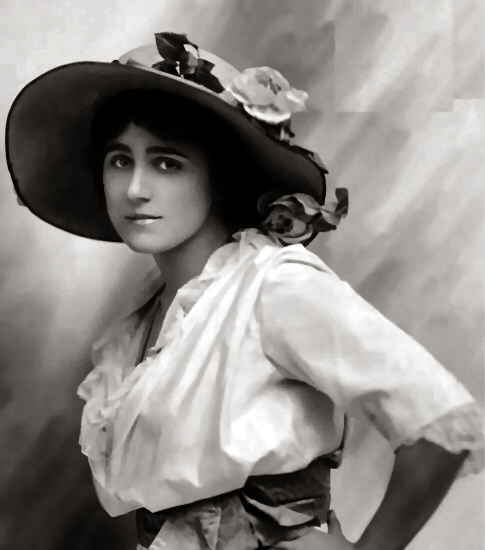
- Ivy Troutman
- Born: October 23, 1884; Long Branch, New Jersey, U.S.
- Died: January 12, 1979 (aged 94); Tinton Falls, New Jersey, U.S.
- Other name: Ivy Troutman Peirce
- Occupation: actor

Ivy Troutman (September 23, 1884 – January 12, 1979) was an American supporting actress active during the first half of the twentieth century. She acted in at least twenty-one Broadway productions between 1902 and 1945, appearing in such long-running plays as A Pair of Sixes, Baby Mine and The Late George Apley. In the 1920s Troutman, with her husband, portrait painter Waldo Peirce, joined the colony of American expatriates in Paris that included Gertrude Stein, F. Scott Fitzgerald, Zelda Fitzgerald and Ernest Hemingway.

== Early life ==
Ivy Troutman was born in Long Branch, New Jersey, the middle of three daughters raised by John J. Troutman and Lyda H. West. Her father, a native of New York, was a carpenter by trade. Her mother, who was born in New Jersey, died at the age of thirty-three just a few days past Troutman's ninth birthday.

Troutman attended Saint Mary's School in Raleigh, North Carolina, where the family had relocated at some point in her youth and, after their return to Long Branch, Chattle High School (since renamed as Long Branch High School).

== Career ==
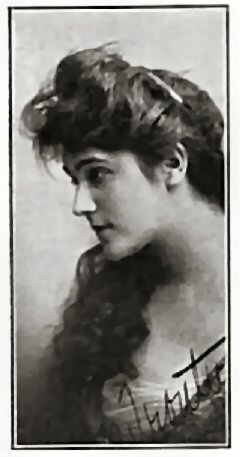
Ivy Troutman, c. 1908

Troutman made her professional stage debt at Wallack's Theatre on April 14, 1902, playing a minor rôle in the Leo Ditrichstein drama, The Last Appeal. Later that year and into the next she toured with E. H. Sothern as Isabel in If I Were King, a historical drama by Justin Huntly McCarthy. At the Herald Square Theatre in March 1903, Troutman played Annie Bellamy to the Peg Woffington of Grace George in Frances Aymar Mathews's biographical drama, Pretty Peggy.

She subsequently left the cast of Pretty Peggy to play leading rôles with Amelia Bingham's touring company before joining Boston's Castle Square Theatre the following season as a stock player. Over the 1905–06 season Troutman toured as Bessie Tanner in George Ade's comedy The Other Girl, and in 1907 she portrayed Estelle Kitteridge in a tour of the Augustus Thomas comedy The Other Girl. At the Empire Theatre on March 2, 1908, Troutman played Frances Berkeley in Ade's comedy-drama, Father and the Boys and the following year toured in Augustus Thomas' The Witching Hour.

=== Broadway ===
Of Troutman's twenty-one Broadway appearances Father and the Boys was the first to achieve a modicum of commercial success with a run of eighty-eight performances. Troutman was Aggie in Baby Mine, a comedy by Margaret Mayo that had a long run during the 1910–11 season at the old Daly's Theatre on 1221 Broadway. In the Owen Johnson drama The Return from Jerusalem, from the French by Maurice Donnay, Troutman was Andree Daincourt to the Henriette de Chouze of Mme. Simone. The Return from Jerusalem closed after fifty-three performances at the Hudson Theatre in late February 1912.

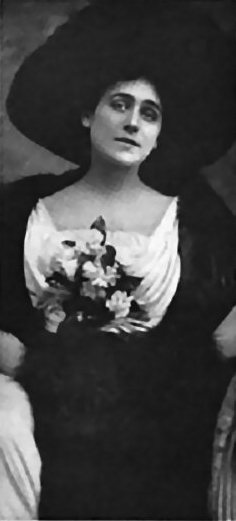
Ivy Troutman, c. 1909

She played Mrs. Nettleton in A Pair of Sixes, a hit comedy at the Longacre Theatre by Edward Peple that, from March and into September 1914, ran for two hundred and seven performances. In Taking Chances, a comedy adapted by J. H. Benrimo and Morgan from the German by Paul Frank and Siegfried Geyer, she played Marielle Blondeau for a run of eighty-five engagements that began on March 17, 1915, at the Thirty-ninth Street Theatre.

On November 29, 1915, Troutman opened at Broadway's Gaiety Theatre as Lillian Wakeley in Avery Hopwood's Sadie Love, a farce-comedy that closed at the Harris Theatre on February 19, 1916, after a combined run of eighty productions. On New Year's Day 1917 she played Guida to Julia Arthur's title rôle in William Lindsay's poetic fairy drama, Seremonda. Staged at the old Criterion Theatre on Forty-Fourth and Broadway, Seremonda had a modest run of forty-eight performances. In 1940 Troutman played Lady Weston in a successful revival of Edward Chodorov's Kind Lady. Presented at the Playhouse Theatre, Kind Lady closed on November 30 after one hundred and seven performances. In her last Broadway performance she played Lydia Leyton in The Late George Apley, a satire of Boston's upper class adapted by George S. Kaufman and John P. Marquand from the novel by the latter. The Late George Apley ran for nearly an entire year at the Lyceum Theatre, closing on November 17, 1945, after three hundred and eighty-four performances.

=== Film ===
Troutman's only known motion picture was The House with Nobody in It, a three-reel mystery with romance, revenge and intrigue produced in 1915 by Gaumont. Written by Clarence J. Harris, the film starred Troutman opposite Bradley Barker and Frank Whitson.

== Waldo Peirce ==
On August 10, 1920, while abroad in Paris, Troutman married the portrait painter Waldo Peirce. Her husband was a close friend of Ernest Hemingway and according to Roselyne Frelinghuysen, wife of the sculptor Thomas T.K. Frelinghuysen, two of Hemingway's characters in The Sun Also Rises were based on Troutman and Peirce. The couple divorced in Paris on October 10, 1930.

According to her former paperboy, Jim Forest, Ivy became close friends with writer James Joyce during her time in Paris with Peirce. "Perhaps the greatest treasure in her treasure-filled house was a copy of the first edition of Joyce's Ulysses..."

== Death ==
Troutman died at her residence in Tinton Falls, New Jersey, aged 94.
