= Afraid of Love (film) =

1925 British silent film by Reginald West

- Directed by: Reginald West
- Written by: Mrs. John Russell; Walter Summers
- Produced by: F.J. Nettlefold
- Starring: Leslie Faber; Jameson Thomas; Moore Marriott; Adeline Hayden Coffin
- Production company: Britannia Films
- Distributed by: United Kingdom Photoplays
- Release date: 21 September 1925
- Running time: 85 minutes
- Country: United Kingdom
- Languages: Silent; English intertitles

Afraid of Love is a 1925 British silent drama film directed by Reginald West and starring Leslie Faber, Jameson Thomas and Moore Marriott.

A review in The Kinematograph Weekly in 1925 says that the plot involves a married man seducing a working-class young woman. At the end of the film the married man commits suicide, his wife marries an old friend and the young woman goes back to her mother. The reviewer writes that the acting is good, the direction "intensely theatrical" and that "The curiosity value of this picture is obvious and exceptional, and it can be played to good business almost anywhere".

== Cast ==
- Leslie Faber as Anthony Bond
- Jameson Thomas as Philip Bryce
- Moore Marriott as Father
- Adeline Hayden Coffin as Mother
- Mickey Brantford as Tony Bond
- Juliette Compton as Ruth
