= The Amazing Partnership =

1921 silent film

- Directed by: George Ridgwell
- Written by: Charles Barnett
- Based on: The Amazing Partnership by E. Phillips Oppenheim
- Starring: Milton Rosmer; Gladys Mason; Arthur Walcott
- Production company: Stoll Pictures
- Distributed by: Stoll Pictures
- Release date: June 1921
- Running time: 68 minutes
- Country: United Kingdom
- Languages: Silent; English intertitles

The Amazing Partnership is a 1921 British silent mystery film directed by George Ridgwell and starring Milton Rosmer, Gladys Mason and Arthur Walcott. It is based on the 1914 novel of the same title by E. Phillips Oppenheim.

== Cast ==
- Milton Rosmer as Pryde
- Gladys Mason as Grace Burton
- Arthur Walcott as Julius Hatten
- Temple Bell as Stella
- Teddy Arundell as Baron Feldemay
- Robert Vallis as Baron's Confederate
- Harry J. North as Jean Marchand
- Charles Barnett as M. DuPay

== Bibliography ==
- Goble, Alan. The Complete Index to Literary Sources in Film. Walter de Gruyter, 1999.
- Low, Rachael. The History of British Film (Volume 3): The History of the British Film 1914 - 1918. Routledge, 2013.
