= Mercy Hatton =

British actress (1891–1986)

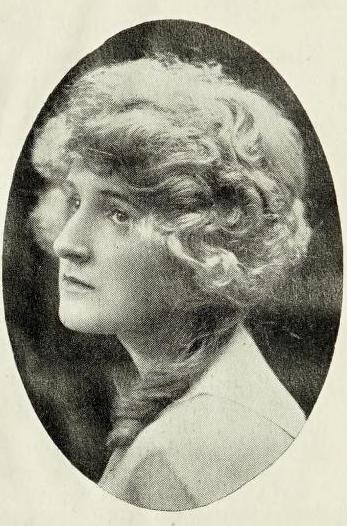
Mercy Hatton, from a 1922 publication.

Mercy Hatton (25 January 1891 – 26 January 1986) was a British actress. She was born in Bromley, Kent, England as Constance Mercy Bird.

Hatton was married to Wilfred (Russell) Mallinson. She died in 1986 in Bray, County Wicklow, Ireland.

== Selected filmography ==
- The Harbour Lights (1914)
- The World, the Flesh and the Devil (1914)
- Beau Brocade (1916)
- The Laughing Cavalier (1917)
- The Romance of Old Bill (1918)
- The Sands of Time (1919)
- Her Son (1920)
- The Case of Lady Camber (1920)
- The Romance of a Movie Star (1920)
- A Sportsman's Wife (1921)
- Christie Johnstone (1921)
- A Master of Craft (1922)
