= A Gentleman of France =

1921 film

- Directed by: Maurice Elvey
- Written by: William J. Elliott; Stanley J. Weyman
- Starring: Eille Norwood; Madge Stuart; Hugh Buckler; Sydney Seaward
- Production company: Stoll Pictures
- Distributed by: Stoll Pictures
- Release date: 1921
- Country: United Kingdom

A Gentleman of France is a 1921 British silent adventure film based on a novel by Stanley J. Weyman directed by Maurice Elvey and starring Eille Norwood, Madge Stuart and Hugh Buckler. It is set in 16th-century France.

== Cast ==
- Eille Norwood - Gaston de Marsac
- Madge Stuart - Mlle de la Vere
- Hugh Buckler - Vicomte de Turennes
- Sydney Seaward - de Bruhl
- Pardoe Woodman - Henry III
- Allan Jeayes - Henry of Navarre
- Harvey Braban - Baron de Rosnay
- Faith Bevan - Madame de Bruhl
- Teddy Arundell - Fresnay
- William Lenders - Simon Fleix
- Robert Vallis - Jester
- Madame d'Esterre - Madame de Marsac
