= The Loudwater Mystery (film) =

1921 film

- Directed by: Walter West
- Written by: Walter West
- Based on: The Loudwater Mystery by Edgar Jepson
- Produced by: Norman MacDonald
- Starring: Gregory Scott; Pauline Peters; Clive Brook
- Production company: Broadwest
- Distributed by: Walturdaw
- Release date: February 1921
- Running time: 4,800 feet
- Country: United Kingdom
- Language: English

The Loudwater Mystery is a 1921 British silent crime film directed by Walter West and starring Gregory Scott, Pauline Peters and Clive Brook. It was based on the 1920 novel The Loudwater Mystery by Edgar Jepson.

== Plot ==
A detective investigating the death of an aristocrat eventually deduces he was murdered by his secretary.

== Cast ==
- Gregory Scott as Hubert Manley
- Pauline Peters as Lady Loudwater
- Clive Brook as Lord Loudwater
- Cameron Carr as Inspector Flexen
- Charles Tilson-Chowne as Colonel Grey
- Arthur Walcott as Carrington
- Nan Heriot as Miss Truslove
- Charles Poulton as Roper

== Bibliography ==
- Low, Rachael. History of the British Film, 1918-1929. George Allen & Unwin, 1971.
