= Robert Vallis =

British actor (1876–1932)

Robert Vallis (1876 in England, UK – 19 December 1932 in Brighton, Sussex) was a British actor.

== Selected filmography ==
- A Son of David (1920)
- Her Benny (1920)
- Gwyneth of the Welsh Hills (1921)
- The Amazing Partnership (1921)
- General John Regan (1921)
- A Gentleman of France (1921)
- The Four Just Men (1921)
- Little Brother of God (1922)
- Squibs' Honeymoon (1923)
- Beautiful Kitty (1923)
- Hurricane Hutch in Many Adventures (1924)
- Not for Sale (1924)
