= Richard Garrick =

American actor

- Born: Richard Thomas O'Brien; December 27, 1878; Portlaw, County Waterford, Ireland
- Died: August 21, 1962 (aged 83); Hollywood, California, U.S.
- Occupations: Actor and Film Director
- Years active: 1900s–1957

Richard Garrick (December 27, 1878 – August 21, 1962) was an Irish-born American actor and director.

== Life and career ==
Garrick was born Richard Thomas O'Brien in the townland of Portlaw, County Waterford, Ireland. His father, James E. O'Brien, was a master tailor in that town, counting among his clients Lord Waterford as well as other nobility and landed gentry. In 1882, James left Portlaw for the United States. He landed in North Adams, Massachusetts, where there were cotton mills and the need for a clothesmaker. Two years later, his wife Johanna and children followed.

In 1898, Garrick enlisted in the U.S. Army. He served as a corporal in Company M, U.S. 26th Infantry Regiment stationed in Miagao, Iloilo, in the Philippines in 1900 during the Philippine–American War. When he returned to North Adams, he worked for a time in his father's tailor shop, then struck out on his own.

The Doctor (Richard Garrick) and Nurse (Ann Dere) subdue an hysterical Blanche (Jessica Tandy) in the original New York production of "A Streetcar Named Desire" at the Ethel Barrymore Theatre.

He ventured to New York City where he landed roles in stage productions, among them The Boys of Company B (1907), The Flag Lieutenant (1909), The Fourth Estate, (1909), and The Monkey's Paw. By 1912 Garrick was in Los Angeles and became a charter member of The Reel Club. Through the early 1910s, Garrick acted in, as well as directed, silent films, including Colonel Custard's Last Stand (1914). In 1915, he joined the Gaumont Company and was placed in charge of the second Rialto Star Feature Company. By 1916, Garrick was the director general of Gaumont's Jacksonville, Florida, studios. He left Gaumont to open Garrick Studios Company, offering a five-acre (20,000 m^{2}) facility in Jacksonville that would house enough equipment and space for 20 companies to work simultaneously. As the 1916–1917 season approached, however, the mood towards making films in Jacksonville shifted, and many residents opposed the industry's presence.

Garrick went overseas in 1919 and directed films in London and Paris. In 1922, he was named production manager of a new film corporation in Italy. Overall, he directed 30 silent films during his career. When he returned to the United States, it was to pursue his first love — stage acting. During World War II, he was among the cast of Ten Little Indians, a production of the U.S. Army Special Service/USO Camp Shows in the Mediterranean Theater of Operations.

In 1947, Garrick was once again on stage in New York City, performing as the mental-health doctor or "stranger" in the original production of A Streetcar Named Desire, which co-starred Marlon Brando and Jessica Tandy. He reprised that role in the 1951 film version of the play. His appearances in both the play and film adaptation marked the start of a second film career for Garrick. During the 1950s, he played small supporting roles in numerous Hollywood movies. His television acting credits include the role of Benjamin Franklin in Night Strike on Calvacade of America (April 29, 1953 and October 19, 1954); and the role of Thaddeus Grimshaw in the episode Royal Carriage on My Friend FlickaMy Friend Flicka (March 16, 1956).

Throughout his career, Garrick performed alongside many actors and actresses, including James Arness, Ed Begley, Marlon Brando, Lee J. Cobb, James Dean, Julie Harris, Brian Keith, Charles Laughton, Vivien Leigh, Karl Malden, Victor Mature, Ethel Merman, Marilyn Monroe, Patricia Neal, Donald O'Connor, Maureen O'Sullivan, Anthony Quinn, Ronald Reagan, Ginger Rogers, Jean Simmons, Richard Todd, Spencer Tracy, Robert Wagner, John Wayne, Dennis Weaver and Richard Widmark.

Garrick taught at the American Academy of Dramatic Arts, and in 1930 he opened the Richard Garrick Studio in Santa Ana, California, to teach drama, English, public speaking, and other subjects to aspiring actors.

Garrick died on August 21, 1962, in Los Angeles.

== Director ==
- A Heart Reclaimed (1912)
- The Part of Her Life (1912)
- The Laird's Daughter (1912)
- His Father's Bugle (1912)
- Officer Murray (1912)
- By-Gone Days (1913)
- Colonel Custard's Last Stand (1914)
- A Wondrous Melody (1914)
- A Tangle in Hearts (1915)
- The Idol of the Stage (1916 film) - Also acted in the role of Clark Porter
- The Drifter (1916)
- The House with Nobody in It (1915)
- Quality of Faith (1916)
- According to Law (1916)
- A Rank Outsider (1920)
- Trent's Last Case (1920)
- The Pride of the Fancy (1920)
- The Romance of a Movie Star (1920)

=== Actor ===
- A Certain Party (1911 play) - Roundsman Timothy Moline
- The Deep Purple (1911 film) - Inspector Bruce
- The Mistress of the Air (1914 film) - Tom Hendricks, the Villain
- Tess of the Storm Country (1914 film) - Ben Letts
- The House with Nobody in It (1915 film)
- The Yellow Streak (1915 film)
- The Collingsby Pearls (1915 film)
- Daughter of Destiny (1917) - Graham West
- Nell of the Circus (1922)
- Le soleil de minuit (1926)
- Desire Under the Elms (1940 play) - Old Ephraim
- Deep Are the Roots (1946 play), Fulton Theatre, New York, NY - Sheriff Serkin
- Boomerang (1947 film) - Graham Rogers - Storekeeper (uncredited)
- Green Grass of Wyoming (1948 film) - Charlie - Old-Timer
- A Streetcar Named Desire (1947 play) - A Doctor
- A Streetcar Named Desire (1951 film) - A Doctor
- Quo Vadis (1951 film) - Slave (uncredited)
- Viva Zapata! (1952 film) - Old General
- Dreamboat (1952 film) - Judge Bowles
- O. Henry's Full House (1952 film) - Doctor (segment "The Last Leaf")
- Bonzo Goes to College (1952 film) - Judge George Simpkins
- Something for the Birds (1952 film) - Chandler
- Stars and Stripes Forever (1952 film) - Secretary of the Navy (uncredited)
- Call Me Madam (1953 film) - Supreme Court Justice (uncredited)
- Trouble Along the Way (1953 film) - Judge (uncredited)
- The System (1953 film) - Frank Tasker
- Law and Order (1953 film) - Judge Williams
- Powder River (film) (1953 film) - Ferry Master
- 'The Frightened Bride' Episode of Mr. & Mrs. North (1953 television) - Amos Stoker
- Riding Shotgun (1954 film) - Walters
- Désirée (1954 film) - Count Regnaud (uncredited)
- Many Rivers to Cross (1955 film) - Preacher Ellis (uncredited)
- East of Eden (1955 film) - Dr. Edwards (uncredited)
- A Man Called Peter (1955 film) - Col. Evanston Whiting
- Violent Saturday (1955 film) - Mr. Braden (uncredited)
- Hilda Crane (1956 film) - Dr. Joe Francis
- High Society (1956 film) - Lords' Butler
- 'The Royal Carriage' Episode of My Friend Flicka (1956 television) - Thaddeus Grimshaw
- The Mountain (1956 film) - Coloz
- The Three Faces of Eve (1957 film) - Mr. Fox (uncredited) (final film role)
