= Benedict James =

British writer and screenwriter

- Born: Bertram James; 31 October 1871; Blaenavon, Monmouthshire; United Kingdom
- Died: 14 August 1957 (aged 85); London, United Kingdom
- Years active: 1915–1930 (films)

Benedict James (1871–1957) was a British writer and screenwriter. He worked on a number of screenplays for the Ideal Film Company, a leading British studio, during the Silent era. His birth name was Bertram James.

== Selected filmography ==
- The Lyons Mail (1916)
- The Second Mrs. Tanqueray (1916)
- Sally in Our Alley (1916)
- The New Clown (1916)
- The Broken Melody (1916)
- Masks and Faces (1917)
- Under Suspicion (1919)
- The Case of Lady Camber (1920)
- A Son of David (1920)
- Sheer Bluff (1921)
- Her Penalty (1921)
- In Full Cry (1921)
- Kissing Cup's Race (1930)
