= Cecil Mannering =

Scottish actor

Cecil Mannering (28 December 1886 – 1974) was a Scottish film actor.

== Selected filmography ==
- Kissing Cup (1913)
- The Heart of Midlothian (1914)
- Beau Brocade (1916)
- The Valley of Fear (1916)
- The Grit of a Jew (1917)
- The Duchess of Seven Dials (1920)
- In Full Cry (1921)
- Lord Arthur Savile's Crime (1922)
- What the Butler Saw (1924)
- Storm in a Teacup (1937)
- Merry Comes to Town (1937)
