= Walthamstow Studios =

Former British film studio in Walthamstow, London, United Kingdom

- Interactive map of the Walthamstow Studios area

General information
- Type: Film studios
- Location: High Street, Walthamstow, London, United Kingdom
- Coordinates: 51°35′02″N 0°01′16″W
- Opened: 1914
- Closed: 1930
- Owner: Broadwest Films; British Filmcraft

Walthamstow Studios was a British film studio located in Walthamstow, London which operated between 1914 and 1930. Two earlier studios had previously existed in Walthamstow. It was the base of Broadwest films for a number of years, which also used Catford Studios as an overflow facility. It was later owned by British Filmcraft. After the bankruptcy the studios were sold off for non-film use.

== Selected films ==
- The Merchant of Venice (1916)
- The Case of Lady Camber (1920)
- Christie Johnstone (1921)
- The Burgomaster of Stilemonde (1929)

== Bibliography ==
- Warren, Patricia. British Film Studios: An Illustrated History. Batsford, 2001.
