= Arthur Walcott =

British actor (1857–1934)

Arthur Walcott (1857–1934) was a British actor of the silent era.

== Selected filmography ==
- The Mystery of a Hansom Cab (1915)
- The White Star (1915)
- A Gamble for Love (1917)
- Drink (1917)
- The Woman Wins (1918)
- The Wages of Sin (1918)
- Not Negotiable (1918)
- Under Suspicion (1919)
- When It Was Dark (1919)
- A Son of David (1920)
- The Scarlet Wooing (1920)
- Little Dorrit (1920)
- The Woman of the Iron Bracelets (1920)
- Unmarried (1920)
- Kissing Cup's Race (1920)
- A Sportsman's Wife (1921)
- The Amazing Partnership (1921)
- The Marriage Lines (1921)
- The Other Person (1921)
- The Loudwater Mystery (1921)
- Son of Kissing Cup (1922)
- Was She Justified? (1922)
- When Greek Meets Greek (1922)
- The Scarlet Lady (1922)
- The Uninvited Guest (1923)
- The Lady Owner (1923)
- Hornet's Nest (1923)
- In the Blood (1923)
- What Price Loving Cup? (1923)
- Beautiful Kitty (1923)
- Shadow of Egypt (1924)
- The Great Turf Mystery (1924)
- A Daughter of Love (1925)
- Somebody's Darling (1925)
- London Love (1926)
