= Clive Brook =

English film actor (1887–1974)

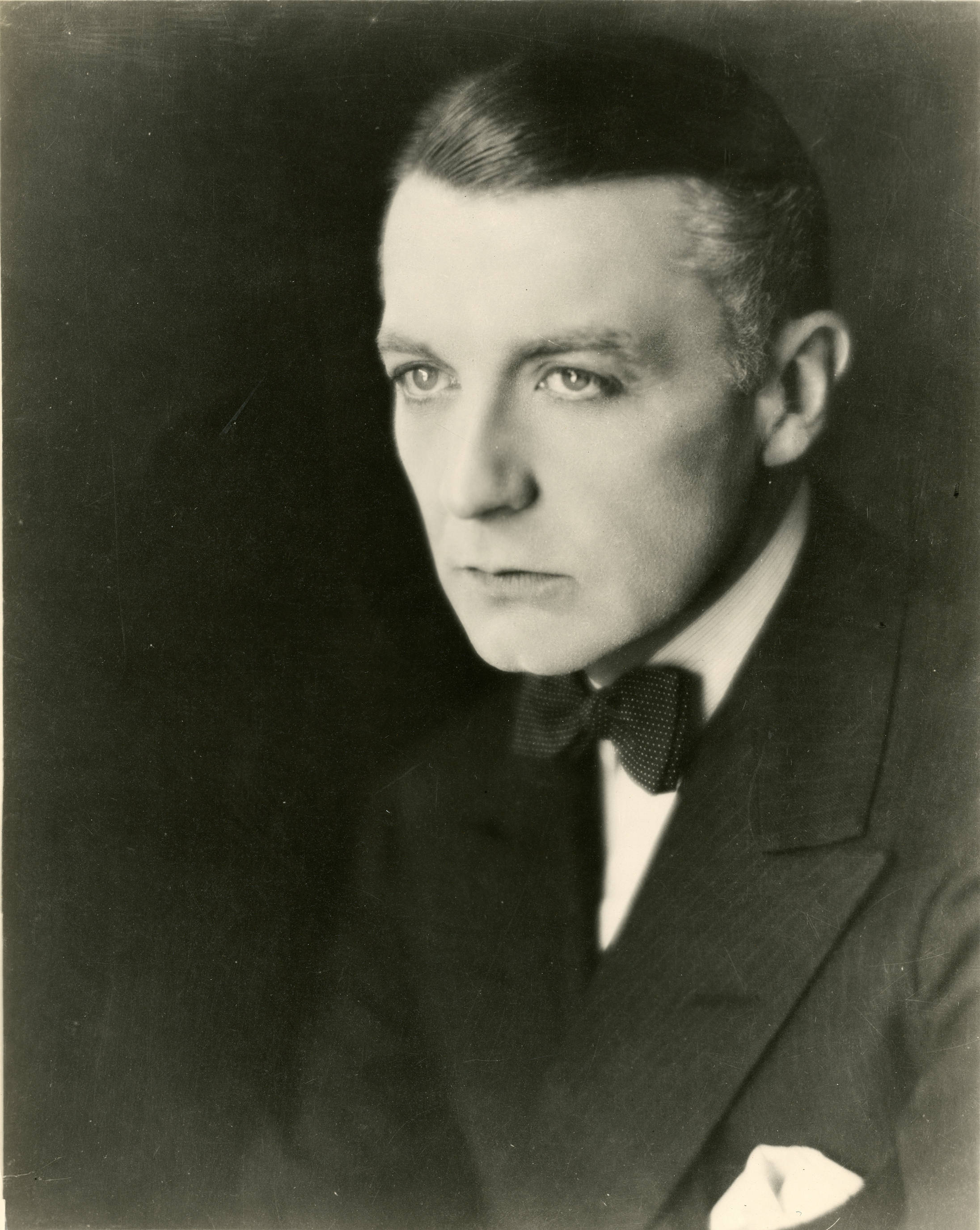
- Brook in 1925
- Born: Clifford Hardman Brook; 1 June 1887; Islington, London, Britain
- Died: 17 November 1974 (aged 87); Ealing, London, Britain
- Education: Dulwich College
- Occupation: Actor
- Years active: 1918–1963
- Spouse: Charlotte Elisabeth Mildred Evelyn
- Children: Faith Brook; Lyndon Brook

Clifford Hardman "Clive" Brook (1 June 1887 – 17 November 1974) was an English stage and film actor.

After making his first screen appearance in 1920, Brook emerged as a leading British actor in the early 1920s. After moving to the United States in 1924, Brook became one of the major stars for Paramount Pictures in the late silent era. During 1928–29 he successfully made the transition to sound and continued to be featured in many of Hollywood's most prestigious films. Career highlights include Josef Von Sternberg's Underworld (1927) and Shanghai Express (1932); as well as being the first actor to portray Sherlock Holmes in a 'talkie'. In the mid-1930s he returned to Britain where he appeared regularly in leading film roles until his retirement from movies in 1944.

== Early life ==
Brook was born in Islington, London, the son of George Alfred Brook and Charlotte Mary Brook. He attended Dulwich College because of his father's desire for him to be a lawyer, but family financial problems caused him to leave at age 15. He then studied elocution at a polytechnic.

He served in the British Army during the First World War, rising to the rank of major. Brook was 5 ft 11 in (1.80 m) tall and had brown hair with grey eyes.

Before Brook went into acting, he worked as a journalist and an insurance clerk. He first appeared on stage in 1918 and also in films from 1919. He worked first in British films then in Hollywood.

== Hollywood ==
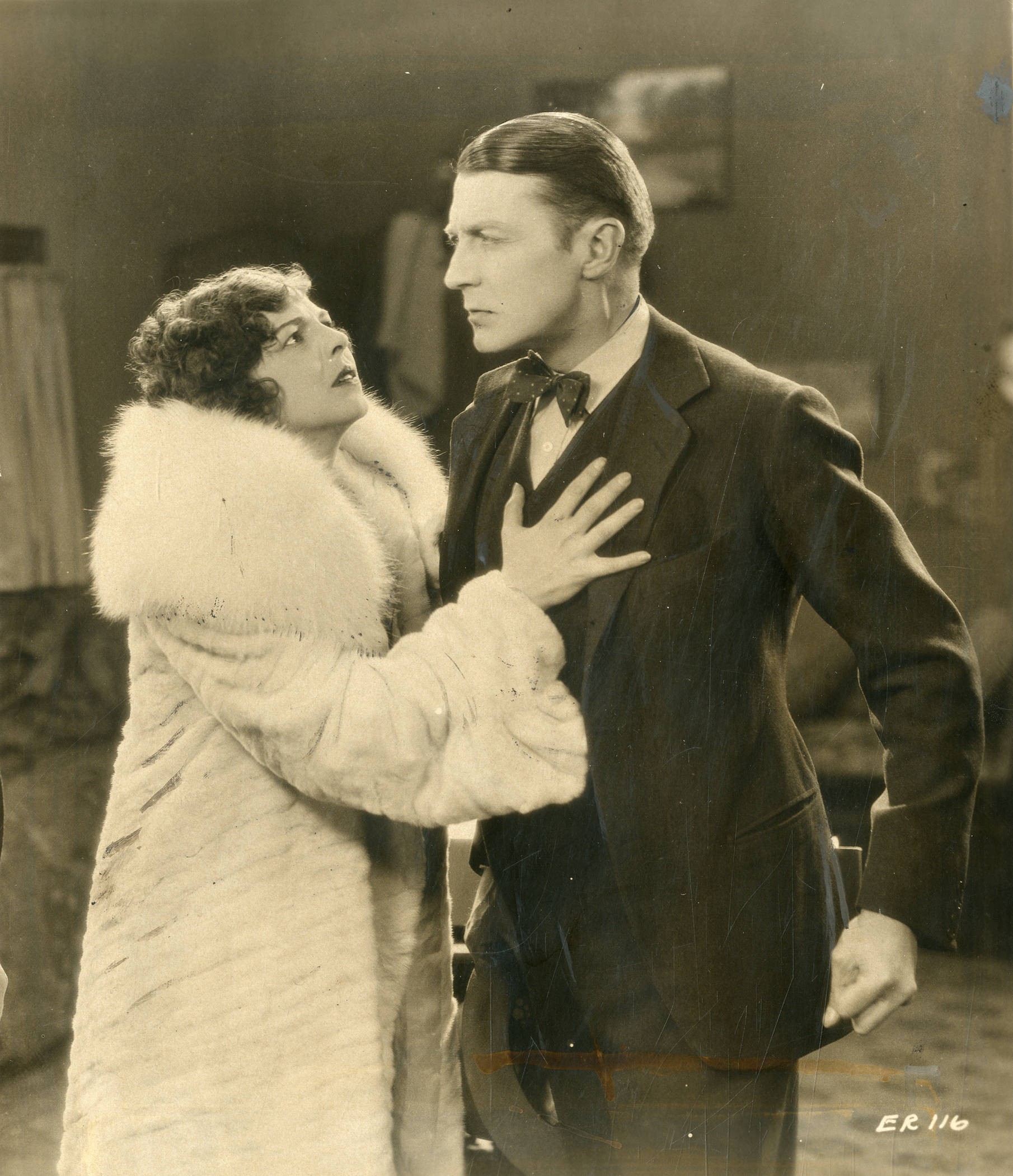
Helene Chadwick and Clive Brook in The Woman Hater (1925)

Brook debuted on film in Trent's Last Case (1920). He was memorable in Josef von Sternberg's Underworld (1927) as an alcoholic ex-lawyer who is taken under the wing of a professional thief. Von Sternberg later featured him in one of Brook's best remembered appearances, playing opposite Marlene Dietrich in Shanghai Express (1932). He played Sherlock Holmes three times: The Return of Sherlock Holmes and Sherlock Holmes (in that order), and as part of an anthology film, Paramount on Parade (1930).

In 1934 he was voted one of the most popular stars at the British box office.

At the end of his career, Brook appeared in a number of British television dramas, notably in the "ITV Play of the Week" strand on the fledgling Independent Television commercial channel. He returned to film one last time in The List of Adrian Messenger (1963).

== Return to England ==
Brook returned to England in 1935 because of kidnapping threats toward his children. In 1943, he adapted the comedy On Approval by Frederick Lonsdale and wrote, produced, directed and starred in the film with Beatrice Lillie, Googie Withers and Roland Culver. The costumes were by Cecil Beaton.

In 1949 he presented the radio series The Secrets of Scotland Yard. In 1956 he appeared on stage in One Bright Day at the Apollo Theatre in London.

== Broadway ==
Brook starred as Josiah Bolton in the comedy Second Threshold from 2 January 1951 until 21 April 1951.

== Death ==
Brook died 17 November 1974 in Ealing, London.

== Family ==
In 1920, Brook married Charlotte Elisabeth Mildred Evelyn. Their children, Faith and Lyndon, were also actors.

== Complete filmography ==
- Trent's Last Case (1920) - John Marlow
- Kissing Cup's Race (1920) - Lord Rattlington
- Her Penalty (1921) - Robert Trenchard
- The Loudwater Mystery (1921) - Lord Loudwater
- Daniel Deronda (1921) - Mallinger Grandcourt
- A Sportsman's Wife (1921) - Dick Anderson
- Sonia (1921) - David O'Raine
- Christie Johnstone (1921) - Astral Hither
- Vanity Fair (1922 short) - Rawdon Crawley
- The Sheik (1922 short) - The Sheik
- A Tale of Two Cities (1922 short) - Sydney Carton
- Shirley (1922) - Robert Moore
- Married to a Mormon (1922) - Lionel Daventry
- Stable Companions (1922) - James Pilkington
- Rigoletto (1922 short) - Duke of Mantua
- La traviata (1922 short) - Alfred Germont
- The Parson's Fight (1922 short) - Parson
- Sir Rupert's Wife (1922 short) - Sir Rupert Leigh
- The Experiment (1922) - Vivian Caryll
- Tense Moments with Great Authors (1922) - Rawdon Crawley (segment "Vanity Fair") / Sydney Carton (segment "Tale of Two Cities, A")
- Tense Moments from Opera (1922) - Duke of Mantna / Alfred Germont (segments "Rigoletto", "La Traviata")
- Love and a Whirlwind (1922) - Grifftih
- A Debt of Honour (1922) - Walter Hyde
- Through Fire and Water (1923) - John Dryden
- This Freedom (1923) - Harry Occleve
- Out to Win (1923) - Barraclough / Altar
- The Royal Oak (1923) - Dorian Clavering
- The Reverse of the Medal (1923 short) - General
- Woman to Woman (1923) - David Compton / David Anson-Pond
- The Money Habit (1924) - Noel Jason
- The Recoil (1924) - Marchmont
- The White Shadow (1924) - Robin Field
- The Wine of Life (1924) - Michael Strong
- The Passionate Adventure (1924) - Adrien St. Clair
- Christine of the Hungry Heart (1924) - Dr. Alan Monteagle
- Human Desires (1924) - Georges Gautier
- The Mirage (1924) - Henry Galt
- Declassée (1925) - Rudolph Solomon
- Enticement (1925) - Henry Wallis
- Playing with Souls (1925) - Matthew Dale Sr.
- If Marriage Fails (1925) - Joe Woodbury
- The Woman Hater (1925) - Miles - the Woman-hater
- The Home Maker (1925) - Lester Knapp
- Compromise (1925) - Alan Tahyer
- Seven Sinners (1925) - Jerry Winters
- The Pleasure Buyers (1925) - Tad Workman
- When Love Grows Cold (1926) - Jerry Benson
- Three Faces East (1926) - Valdar
- Why Girls Go Back Home (1926) - Clifford Dudley
- You Never Know Women (1926) - Norodin
- For Alimony Only (1926) - Peter Williams
- The Popular Sin (1926) - Jean Corot
- Afraid to Love (1927) - Sir Reginald Belsize
- Barbed Wire (1927) - Oskar Muller
- Underworld (1927) - Rolls-Royce Wensel
- Hula (1927) - Anthony Haldane
- The Devil Dancer (1927) - Stephen Athelstan
- French Dressing, aka Lessons for Wives (1927) - Henri de Briac
- Midnight Madness (1928) - Michael Bream
- Yellow Lily (1928) - Archduke Alexander
- The Perfect Crime (1928) - Benson
- Forgotten Faces (1928) - Heliotrope Harry Harlow
- Interference (1928) - Sir John Marlay
- A Dangerous Woman (1929) - Frank Gregory
- The Four Feathers (1929) - Lt. Jack Durrance
- Charming Sinners (1929) - Robert Miles
- The Return of Sherlock Holmes (1929) - Sherlock Holmes
- The Marriage Playground (1929) - On-Screen Trailer Host and Narrator (uncredited)
- The Laughing Lady (1929) - Daniel Farr
- Slightly Scarlet (1930) - Hon. Courtenay Parkes
- Paramount on Parade (1930) - Sherlock Holmes (Murder Will Out)
- Sweethearts and Wives (1930) - Reginald De Brett
- Anybody's Woman (1930) - Neil Dunlap
- Scandal Sheet (1931) - Noel Adams
- East Lynne (1931) - Capt. William Levison
- Tarnished Lady (1931) - Norman Cravath
- The Lawyer's Secret (1931) - Drake Norris
- Silence (1931) - Jim Warren
- 24 Hours (1931) - Jim Towner
- Husband's Holiday (1931) - George Boyd
- Shanghai Express (1932) - Captain Donald Harvey
- The Man from Yesterday (1932) - Captain Tony Clyde
- Make Me a Star (1932) - Himself (uncredited)
- The Night of June 13 (1932) - John Curry
- Sherlock Holmes (1932) - Sherlock Holmes
- Cavalcade (1933) - Robert Marryot
- Midnight Club (1933) - Colin Grant
- If I Were Free (1933) - Gordon Evers
- Gallant Lady (1934) - Dan Pritchard
- Where Sinners Meet (1934) - Mr. Latimer
- Let's Try Again (1934) - Dr. Jack Overton
- The Dictator (1935) - Dr. Friedrich Struensee
- Dressed to Thrill (1935) - Bill Trent
- Love in Exile (1936) - King Regis VI
- Lonely Road (1936) - Malcolm Stevenson
- Action for Slander (1937) - Maj. George Daviot
- The Ware Case (1938) - Sir Hubert Ware
- Return to Yesterday (1940) - Robert Maine
- Convoy (1940) - Captain Armitage
- Freedom Radio (1941) - Karl
- Breach of Promise (1942) - Peter Conroy
- The Flemish Farm (1943) - Maj. Lessart
- The Shipbuilders (1943) - Leslie Pagan
- On Approval (1944, also director, producer and screenwriter) - George, 10th Duke of Bristol
- The List of Adrian Messenger (1963) - Marquis of Gleneyre

== Bibliography ==
- Scott, Ian. From Pinewood to Hollywood: British Filmmakers in American Cinema, 1910–1969. Palgrave MacMillan, 2010.
