= Pauline Peters =

Welsh actress (1895–1976)

- Born: 24 August 1895; Cardiff, Wales, UK
- Died: 24 December 1976 (aged 81); South Africa
- Occupation: Actress

Pauline Peters (24 August 1895 – 14 December 1976) was a Welsh actress in dozens of silent films.

== Early life ==
Pauline Peters was born in Cardiff.

== Selected filmography ==
Peters appeared in dozens of silent films, including the "Walter" serials with Walter Forde. She also appeared in one sound picture, her last role, in Deadlock (1931).

- Home (1915)
- Florence Nightingale (1915)
- Trent's Last Case (1920)
- The Loudwater Mystery (1921)
- Her Penalty (1921)
- In Full Cry (1921)
- The Mayor of Casterbridge (1921)
- Walter Makes a Movie (1922)
- The Lilac Sunbonnet (1922)
- The Missioner (1922)
- Deadlock (1931)

== Personal life ==
Peters married English film producer and actor A. George Smith. She died in South Africa in 1976, at the age of 81.
