= Walter West (director) =

British film director

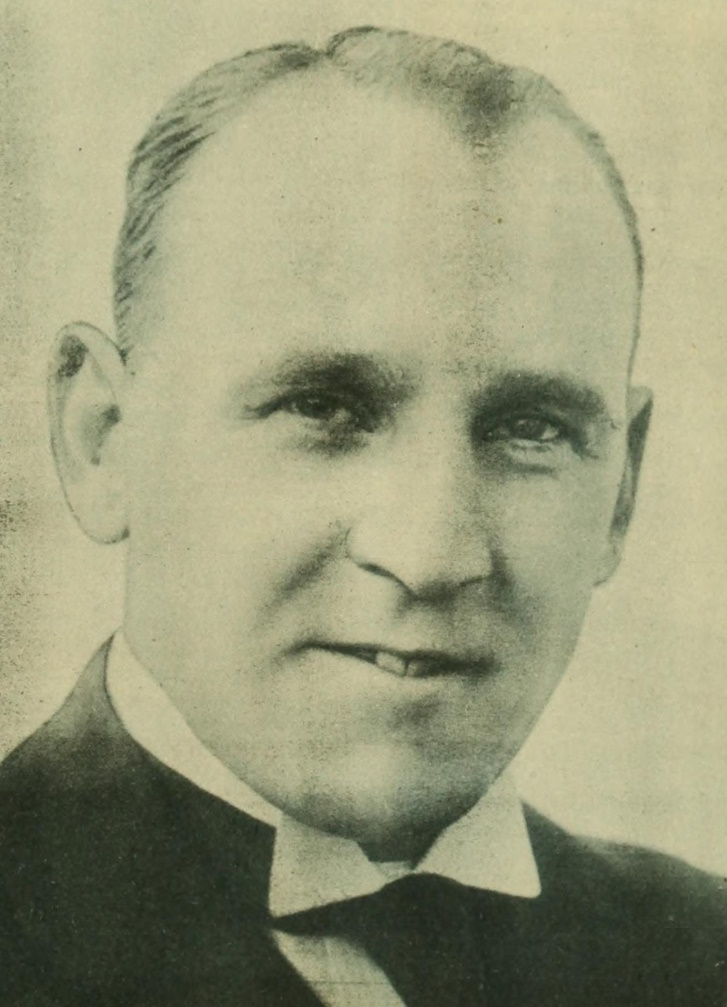
- Born: Walter Alabaster West; 11 September 1885; Cookham, Berkshire, England
- Died: 7 March 1958 (aged 72); London, England
- Other name: Walter Leonard Alabaster West
- Occupations: Film director Film producer

Walter Alabaster West (9 November 1885 – 3 July 1958) was an English film director and producer. He was a partner in the film production company Broadwest Films.

== Early life ==
Walter West was born in Cookham, Berkshire on 11 September 1885. His early silent films, some of which are in the collection of the BFI National Archive, include The Merchant of Venice (1915). He owned extensive film studios, one of the largest being the glass studios at Walthamstow, London, purchased from Cunard Films. With George Broadbridge (later Lord Broadbridge), he formed the Broadwest Films Company. Films made by Broadwest were not only shown in the UK but exported internationally, including India, New Zealand, Scandinavia and the US. In her book, British Film Studios: An Illustrated History, Patricia Warren writes: "In 1916, Broadwest, who ranked alongside film companies of the day such as Hepworth, Barker and British and Colonial, bought the studio and its equipment... By the end of the war in 1918, Broadwest was recognised as one of the UK's most important film-makers, but nevertheless, along with a number of production companies, they ran into financial difficulties after the post-war boom....by 1921 Broadwest had gone into liquidation." During World War II, West was making propaganda films for the war effort, commissioned by the government. He also worked as Chief Inspector of Production for ENSA (the organisation providing entertainment for the Services nationwide). Walter West's love of the turf was evident from the subject matter of many of his early silent films. He directed Kings of the Turf (1949) featuring the jockey Gordon Richards.

In the 1950s, he formed his own company again, Walter West Productions, making short films featuring Gordon Richards and also Pat Smyth at White City. His son, Walter Stanley, was also involved in the production of these shorts. Walter West died on 7 March 1958.

== Broadwest ==
In 1914 West created Broadwest Films after acquiring funding from T.G. Broadhurst. The company began at a small studio in Esher and started its production cycle with four comparatively lavish adaptations of popular novels. In 1916 the company moved to a larger studio in Walthamstow where West continued his directing role.

== Selected filmography ==
- Honour in Pawn (1916)
- The Answer (1916)
- Burnt Wings (1916)
- Missing the Tide (1918)
- A Fortune at Stake (1918)
- Sisters in Arms (1918)
- A Great Coup (1919)
- The Gentleman Rider (1919)
- Snow in the Desert (1919)
- The Soul of Guilda Lois (1919)
- A Daughter of Eve (1919)
- Under Suspicion (1919)
- The Case of Lady Camber (1920)
- Kissing Cup's Race (1920)
- The Imperfect Lover (1921)
- Her Penalty (1921)
- The Penniless Millionaire (1921)
- The Loudwater Mystery (1921)
- In Full Cry (1921)
- The Scarlet Lady (1922)
- Son of Kissing Cup (1922)
- Was She Justified? (1922)
- When Greek Meets Greek (1922)
- The Lady Owner (1923)
- Beautiful Kitty (1923)
- Hornet's Nest (1923)
- In the Blood (1923)
- What Price Loving Cup? (1923)
- The Great Turf Mystery (1924)
- The Stirrup Cup Sensation (1924)
- A Daughter of Love (1925)
- Trainer and Temptress (1925)
- Riding for a King (1926)
- Beating the Book (1926)
- Sweeney Todd (1928)
- Maria Marten (1928)
- Warned Off (1930)
- Hundred to One (1933)
- Bed and Breakfast (1938)

== Bibliography ==
- Bamford, Kenton. Distorted Images: British National Identity and Film in the 1920s. I.B. Tauris, 1999.
- Low, Rachael. The History of British Film, Volume III: 1914-1918. Routledge, 1997.
