= Broadwest =

Defunct British film company

- Type: Production company
- Industry: Film production
- Founder: George Broadbridge; Walter West
- Headquarters: United Kingdom

Broadwest or the Broadwest Film Company was a British film production company of the silent era. Its name it a portmanteau of its two founders, George Broadbridge and the film director Walter West. West took an active role in the company's productions, directing and producing many of the films. The company gained a reputation for producing films about horse racing, often based on popular novels such as those of Nathaniel Gould.

The company was based at Walthamstow Studios, although some films were also made at Esher Studios during the early days of the company's existence.

== Bibliography ==
- Low, Rachael. The History of the British Film, 1918-1929. George Allen & Unwin, 1971.
- Warren, Patricia. British Film Studios: An Illustrated History. Batsford, 2001.
