= Almost Married (1932 film) =

1932 film

- Directed by: William Cameron Menzies
- Screenplay by: Guy Bolton; Alexander Kirkland; Wallace Smith
- Based on: The Devil's Triangle by Andrew Soutar
- Produced by: William Sistrom
- Starring: Violet Heming; Ralph Bellamy; Alexander Kirkland; Alan Dinehart
- Cinematography: John J. Mescall; George Schneiderman
- Edited by: Harold D. Schuster
- Music by: George Lipschultz
- Production company: Fox Film Corporation
- Distributed by: Fox Film Corporation
- Release date: July 17, 1932
- Running time: 50 minutes
- Country: United States
- Language: English

Almost Married is a 1932 American pre-Code thriller film directed by William Cameron Menzies and written by Guy Bolton, Alexander Kirkland and Wallace Smith. The film stars Violet Heming, Ralph Bellamy, Alexander Kirkland and Alan Dinehart.

The film is adapted from the 1931 novel The Devil's Triangle by the British writer Andrew Soutar. It was made by Fox Film, the forerunner of 20th Century Fox. The film's art director was Gordon Wiles while the costumes were designed by Dolly Tree.

== Plot ==
A Russian woman with a forged passport attempts to elude the police and seeks the assistance of a man she met one summer in Scotland. She married an official at the British Embassy in Moscow, and settles down with him in England. However she reveals that she is already married, and her husband is criminally insane.

== Cast ==
- Violet Heming as Anita Mellikovna
- Ralph Bellamy as Deene Maxwell
- Alexander Kirkland as Louis Capristi / Charles Pringle
- Alan Dinehart as Inspector Slante
- Mary Gordon as Cook
- Maria Alba as Mariette
- Mischa Auer as Russian Policeman
- Herbert Bunston as Lord Laverling
- Eva Dennison as Lady Laverling
- Grayce Hampton as Aunt Mathilda
- Herbert Mundin as Jenkins, the butler
- Tempe Pigott
- Gustav von Seyffertitz
