= The Lady Wants Mink =

1953 film by William A. Seiter

- Theatrical release poster
- Directed by: William A. Seiter
- Screenplay by: Dane Lussier; Richard Alan Simmons
- Story by: Leonard Neubauer; Lou Schor
- Produced by: Herbert J. Yates
- Starring: Dennis O'Keefe; Ruth Hussey; Eve Arden; William Demarest; Gene Lockhart; Hope Emerson
- Cinematography: Reggie Lanning
- Edited by: Fred Allen
- Music by: Stanley Wilson
- Production company: Republic Pictures
- Distributed by: Republic Pictures
- Release date: March 30, 1953
- Running time: 92 minutes
- Country: United States
- Language: English

The Lady Wants Mink is a 1953 American comedy film directed by William A. Seiter and written by Dane Lussier and Richard Alan Simmons. The film stars Dennis O'Keefe, Ruth Hussey, Eve Arden, William Demarest, Gene Lockhart and Hope Emerson. The film was released on March 30, 1953, by Republic Pictures.

== Plot ==
Jim Connors buys his wife a new coat, but neighbor Harvey Jones tops him by buying his own wife Gladys a mink. Nora Connors does not mind, but Jim, a debt collector for a department store, becomes self-conscious about his income.

An off-hand remark by Gladys gives an idea to Nora to buy a couple of actual minks and bring them home. Although the animals are caged, they create problems with neighbors and with the city, which wants assurances Nora is not starting a fur business. She decides the family should move to the country and do exactly that.

== Cast ==
- Dennis O'Keefe as Jim Connors
- Ruth Hussey as Nora Connors
- Eve Arden as Gladys Jones
- William Demarest as Harvey Jones
- Gene Lockhart as Mr. Heggie
- Hope Emerson as Mrs. Hoxie
- Hillary Brooke as Evelyn Cantrell
- Tommy Rettig as Ritchie Connors
- Earl Robie as Sandy Connors
- Mary Field as Janie
- Isabel Randolph as Mrs. Frazier
- Thomas Browne Henry as Mr. Swiss
- Brad Johnson as Bud Dunn
- Mara Corday as Model
- Robert Shayne as Cecil
- Jean Fenwick as Faye
- Jean Vachon as Doris
- Vici Raaf as Daisy
- Mary Alan Hokanson as Marian
