= Worldly Goods (1930 film) =

1930 film directed by Phil Rosen

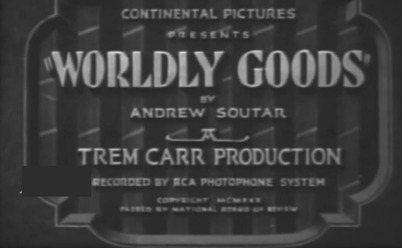
- Directed by: Phil Rosen
- Story by: Andrew Soutar
- Produced by: Trem Carr
- Cinematography: Herbert Kirkpatrick
- Edited by: Carl Himm
- Production company: Trem Carr Productions
- Distributed by: Continental Talking Pictures
- Release date: August 1, 1930 (US)
- Running time: 61 minutes
- Country: United States
- Language: English

Worldly Goods is a 1930 American pre-Code melodrama film directed by Phil Rosen based on a story by Andrew Soutar, starring James Kirkwood Sr. and Merna Kennedy. Distributed by Continental Talking Pictures, the film was released on August 1, 1930.

== Plot ==
Blinded by an airplane crash in France, Jeff swears vengeance on John C. Tullock, a profiteering manufacturer, who produces faulty planes for government contracts.

== Cast ==
- James Kirkwood Sr. as John C. Tullock
- Merna Kennedy as Mary Thurston
- Shannon Day as Cassie
- Ferdinand Schumann-Heink as Jeff
- Eddie Fetherston as Jimmy (credited as "Eddie Featherstone")
- Thomas A. Curran as the secretary
