= Two Arabian Knights =

1927 film

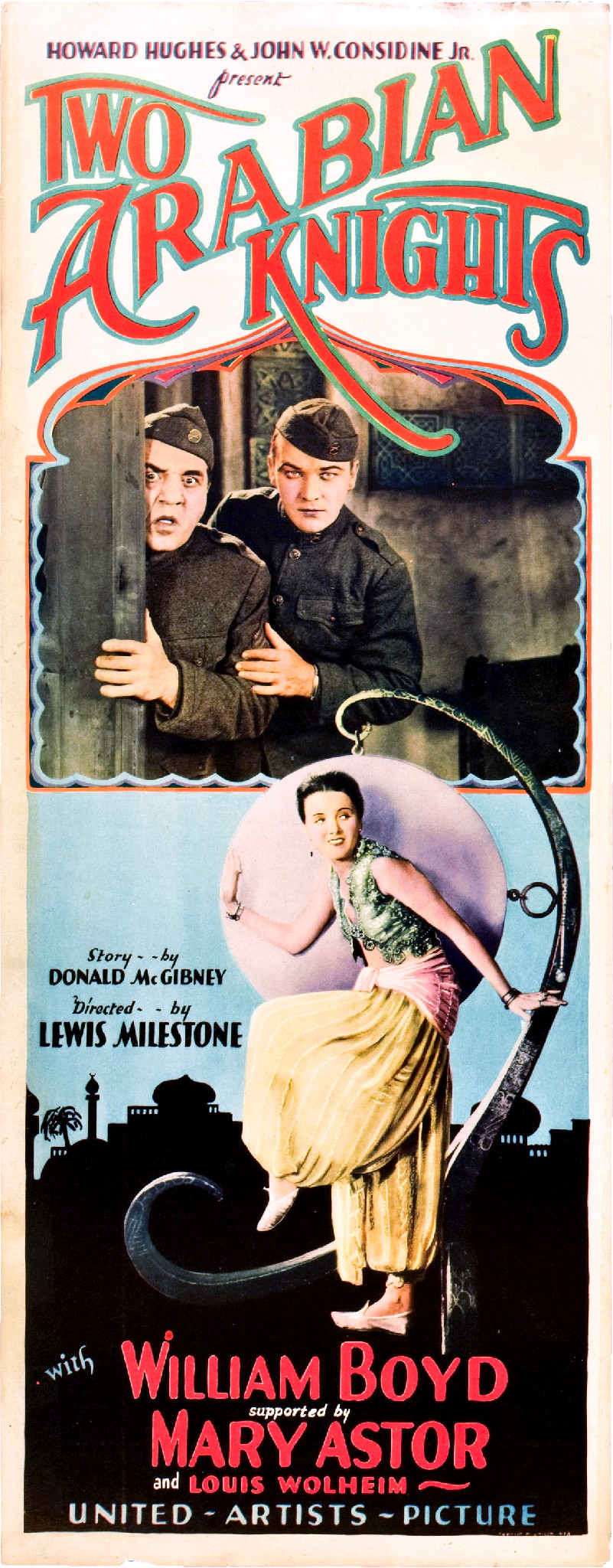
- theatrical release poster
- Directed by: Lewis Milestone
- Screenplay by: Wallace Smith; Cyril Gardner; James T. O'Donohoe; George Marion Jr.
- Based on: Two Arabian Knights; 1924 story in McClure's Magazine by Donald McGibney
- Produced by: John W. Considine Jr. Howard Hughes
- Starring: William Boyd; Mary Astor; Louis Wolheim
- Cinematography: Tony Gaudio; Joseph H. August
- Edited by: Douglass Biggs
- Production company: The Caddo Company
- Distributed by: United Artists
- Release date: September 23, 1927
- Running time: 92 minutes
- Country: United States
- Language: Silent (English intertitles)

Two Arabian Knights is a 1927 American silent comedy film, directed by Lewis Milestone and starring William Boyd, Mary Astor, and Louis Wolheim. The film was produced by Howard Hughes and was distributed by United Artists. The screenwriters were James T. O'Donohue, Wallace Smith, and George Marion Jr, based on a 1924 story by Donald McGibney, serialized in McClure's Magazine.

The film won the only Academy Award for Best Comedy Direction in 1929. The next year, AMPAS merged the categories Best Director of a Comedy Picture and Best Director of a Dramatic Picture to form the category Academy Award for Best Director.

== Plot ==
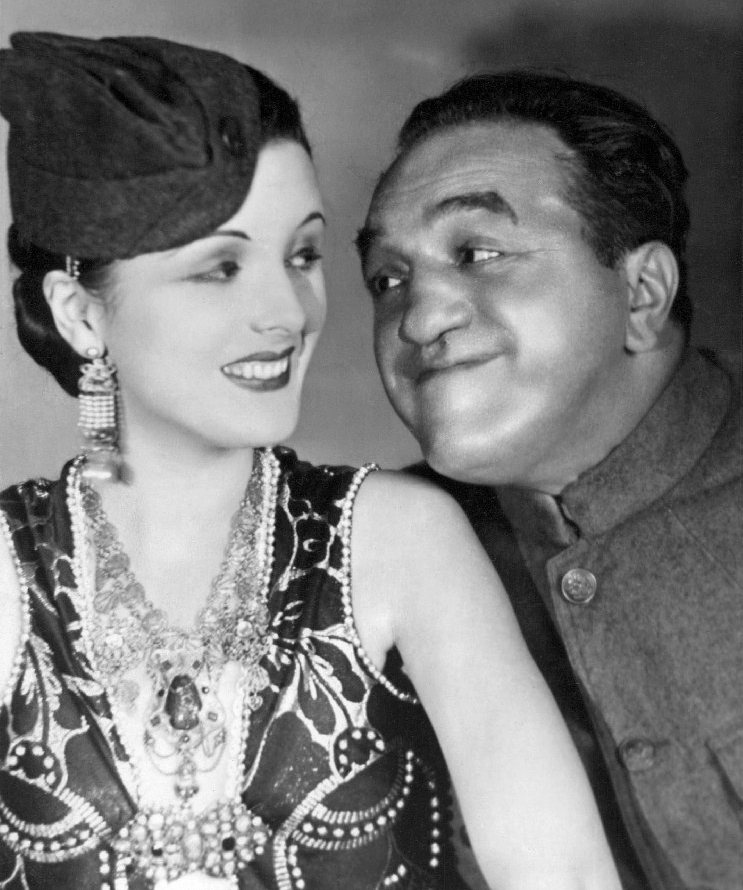
Mary Astor and Louis Wolheim in Two Arabian Knights

During the First World War, two American soldiers become trapped in no man's land. Expecting to die, W. Dangerfield Phelps III decides to fulfill his fondest desire: to beat up his sergeant since training camp, Peter O'Gaffney. While they are brawling, the Germans sneak up and capture them.

In a German prison camp, the two become friends when Phelps takes responsibility for an unflattering caricature he drew of a guard, rather than let O'Gaffney take the blame. The two escape, stealing the white robes of Arab prisoners to blend in with the snow. However, they encounter (and are forced to join) a group of similarly garbed Arab prisoners being sent by train to Constantinople.

Near the end of their journey, Phelps creates a distraction, and the two men jump off, landing in a hay wagon. When the hay is loaded onto a ship bound for Arabia, so are they. The stowaways are discovered, but the skipper is satisfied when Phelps pays him their fare.

When a small boat founders nearby, Phelps jumps in to try to rescue an Arabian woman, Mirza. Both he and the woman have to be saved by O'Gaffney. The two soldiers and the skipper vie for the veiled woman's affections. Phelps eventually coaxes her into removing her veil, and is entranced by her beauty. Meanwhile, the woman's escort observes this development with disapproval. The skipper insists on being paid for Mirza's fare, but none of the three have any money left. They hold him off as best they can.

When they reach their destination, the skipper refuses to let Mirza debark without paying, so O'Gaffney robs the purser to get the money. Mirza is met by Shevket Ben Ali; Mirza informs Phelps that her father has arranged for her to marry Shevket. They depart. The Americans jump overboard when the skipper discovers what happened to his purser.

The two men head for the American consul, but leave hastily without speaking to him when they find the skipper already there lodging a complaint. They decide to seek the assistance of Mirza's father the Emir, who turns out to be the governor of the region. However, Mirza's escort has told him and Shevket that Phelps has seen her without her veil. Outraged, the Emir sends his men to bring the Americans back to be executed. Unaware of this, the two soldiers saunter into the Emir's palace. Phelps reads Mirza's warning note in time, and the two escape.

When Phelps sets out to rescue Mirza, O'Gaffney shows true friendship and accompanies him. They are trapped by Shevket and his men, but when Mirza threatens to kill herself, Shevket proposes they settle this with a duel in which only one of the pistols is loaded with a real bullet, the other gun has a blank cartridge. Phelps agrees and fires first; his gun contains the blank. Mirza is made to leave the room. Then Shevket reveals that both guns had blanks; he did not wish to wager his life with a "dog". He exits, leaving his men to dispose of Phelps. The two men overcome their captors, relieve Shevket of Mirza, and ride away.

== Cast ==
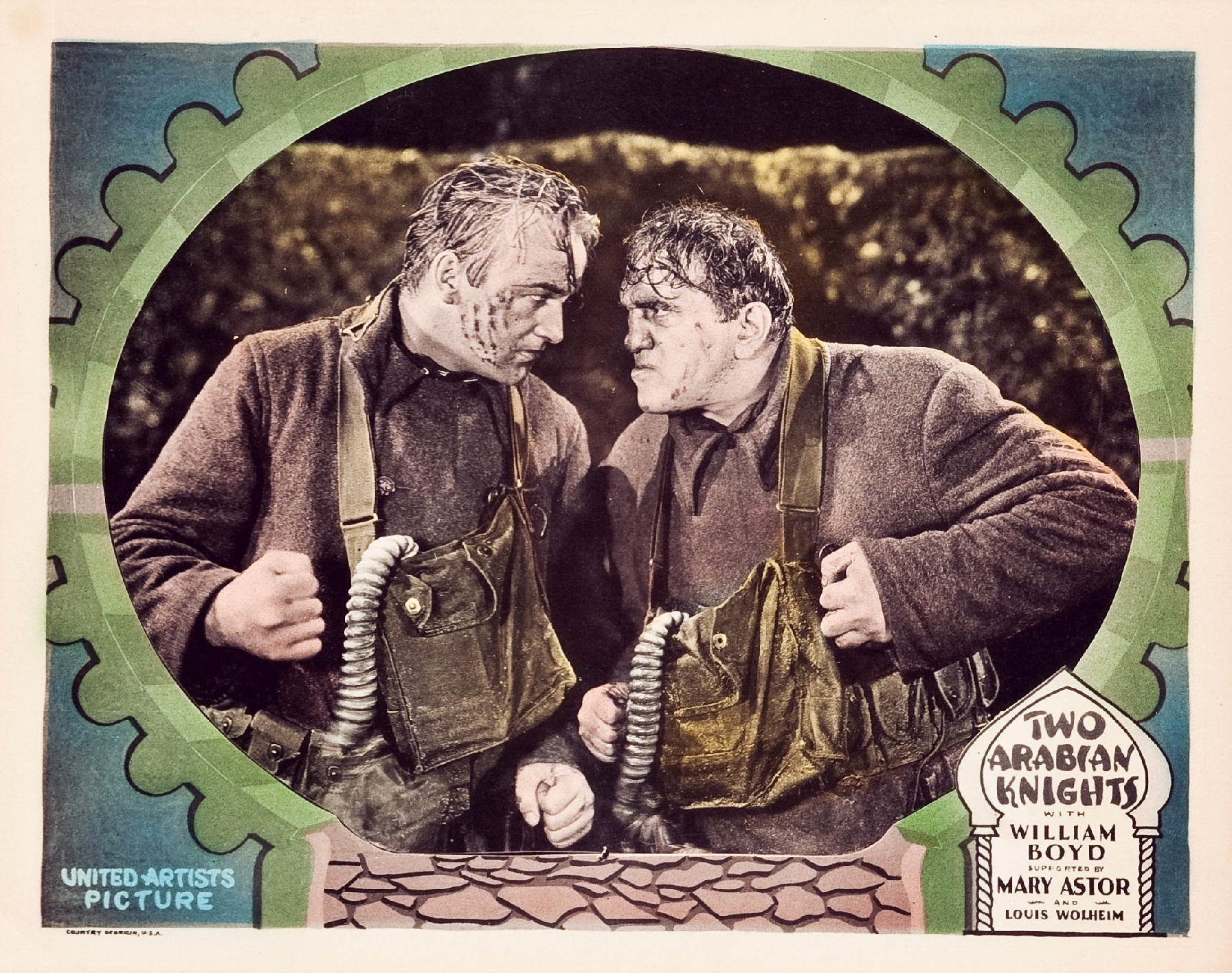
Lobby card

- William Boyd as W. Dangerfield Phelps III
- Mary Astor as Mirza
- Louis Wolheim as Sgt. Peter O'Gaffney
- Ian Keith as Shevket Ben Ali
- Michael Vavitch as The Emir
- Michael Visaroff as The Skipper
- Boris Karloff as The Purser
- DeWitt Jennings as American Consul
- Nicholas Dunaew as Mirza's Man Servant
- Jean Vachon as Mirza's Maid Servant
- David Cavendish as The Emir's Advisor

== Production ==
The movie was filmed in the United States. Roughly four months after the film's premiere, it was reported that director Lewis Milestone had been hired primarily on the basis of his work on Harold Lloyd's The Kid Brother (1927).

== Preservation and home video ==
The film was long thought lost before being located in Howard Hughes' film collection after his death. Two Arabian Knights was preserved by the Academy Film Archive, in partnership with University of Nevada, Las Vegas, in 2016.

A restored version of the film alongside Hughes' The Racket was released on Blu-ray by Flicker Alley in July 2026, in a set titled Howard Hughes in Hollywood: Volume One.

== See also ==
- Boris Karloff filmography
- List of rediscovered films
