= The Green Orchard =

- Directed by: Harold Weston
- Written by: Andrew Soutar (novel); Harold Weston
- Produced by: Walter West
- Starring: Gregory Scott; Dora Barton; Ernie Collins
- Production company: Broadwest
- Distributed by: Broadwest
- Release date: June 1916
- Running time: 5 reels
- Country: United Kingdom
- Languages: Silent; English intertitles

The Green Orchard is a 1916 British silent drama film directed by Harold Weston and starring Gregory Scott, Dora Barton and Ernie Collins. It is based on a novel by Andrew Soutar.

== Cast ==
- Gregory Scott as Martin Wilderspin
- Dora Barton as Fauvette Hyne
- E. Vassal-Vaughn as Tony Rye
- Ernie Collins

== See also ==
- His Parisian Wife (1919)

== Bibliography ==
- Low, Rachael. History of the British Film, 1914-1918. Routledge, 2005.
