= Butterflies in the Rain =

1926 film

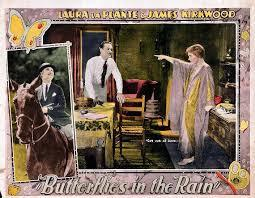
- Lobby card
- Directed by: Edward Sloman
- Written by: Charles Kenyon
- Based on: Butterflies in the Rain by Andrew Soutar
- Produced by: Carl Laemmle
- Starring: Laura La Plante; James Kirkwood; Dorothy Cumming
- Cinematography: Gilbert Warrenton
- Production company: Universal Pictures
- Distributed by: Universal Pictures
- Release date: December 20, 1926
- Running time: 80 minutes
- Country: United States
- Language: Silent (English intertitles)

Several scenes from the film

Butterflies in the Rain is a 1926 American silent romantic comedy film directed by Edward Sloman and starring Laura La Plante, James Kirkwood and Dorothy Cumming. The film is set in England and is based on a novel of the same name by the British writer Andrew Soutar.

== Plot ==
As described in a film magazine, Tina Carteret the beautiful daughter of an aristocratic English family, is a believer in the "new freedom" for women, and is an ardent follower of a group of fake bohemians whom she regards as the earth's elect. When riding she is forced to cross the neighboring estate of John Humphries, a wealthy commoner who has recently purchased the property of a peer, bringing upon himself the bitter resentment of Tina's snobbish family. Her horse falls. She is picked up by John and upbraids him rudely for having his gates closed, blaming him for her accident. The next day she invites him to dinner, pretending repentance for her hasty words, but takes evident pleasure in gently ridiculing his old fashioned dignity, at the same time taking his part when her brothers contemptuously refer to him as "that commoner." Tina hectors John into taking her to a night club, but he refuses to let her go into a certain club that is especially disreputable. This greatly irks the girl who is accustomed to having everything her own way, but she thanks him in the morning when she reads in the paper that the club was raided the night before. Her confidence in the man of old-fashioned virtue grows into love, and they are married, but with the express understanding that Tina is to have absolute liberty. All goes well until Tina announces her intention of taking a holiday in Spain with the quack Bohemians, who are secretly scheming to blackmail the wealthy pair. One of the men in the party forces his way into her room. She fights him off, throwing a dagger that wounds him just as the man's wife and her lawyer enter with the rest of the party and place a hideous interpretation on the compromising scene. Hurrying back to England, the "outraged wife" sends one of her companions to Humphries to tell him that his wife is to be named as co-respondent in her divorce suit. Humphries, caught in a falling market and on the brink of ruin, has borrowed 10,000 pounds to retrieve his fortune. To shield his wife's name he hushes the scandal by giving the last penny he has in the world, even though he believes Tina guilty. He then prepares to leave for America to start life over alone, with never a word of reproach to Tina, whom he considerately avoids. Humphries’ fast friend, Lord Purdon, knows the character of the people they are dealing with and invites them singly to come to the Humphries manse for a "private interview" promising a settlement in money. The whole gang of plotters is brought together in this way. They are recognized by the police as old offenders in the art of blackmail and arrested. Hearing Tina's story, John strips the shirt from the back of her assailant and bares the scar she made in defending herself, proving to John that she was an unwilling victim and that there are limits to her vaunted claims of liberty. The two are brought together again to start life over, John admitting that women should have more liberty, Tina convinced of the wisdom of old-fashioned virtue.

== Cast ==
- Laura La Plante as Tina Carteret
- James Kirkwood as John Humphries
- Robert Ober as Emsley Charleton
- Dorothy Cumming as Lady Pintar
- Oscar Beregi Sr. as Lord Purdon
- Grace Ogden as Miss Flax
- Dorothy Stokes as Miranda
- Edwards Davis as Stuart Carteret
- Edward Lockhart as Aubrey Carteret
- James H. Anderson as Dennis Carteret
- Blackie Thompson as Mr. Sarling
- Rose Burdick as Marie Charleton
- Ruby Lafayette as Mrs. Humphries

== Production ==
Butterflies in the Rain was partially filmed on location at San Mateo, California.

== Preservation ==
With no prints of Butterflies in the Rain located in any film archives, it is a lost film.

== Bibliography ==
- Munden, Kenneth White. The American Film Institute Catalog of Motion Pictures Produced in the United States, Part 1. University of California Press, 1997.
