= Dora Barton =

English actress (1880–1966)

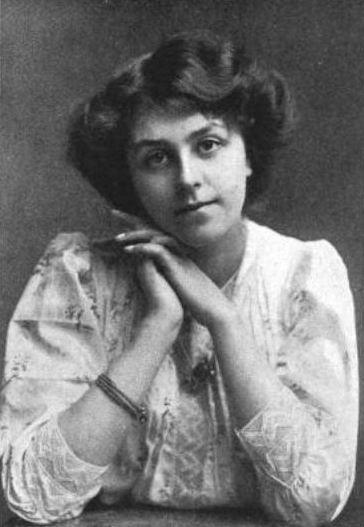
- In The Sketch, 31 July 1901
- Born: Dora Brockbank; 20 January 1880; London, England
- Died: 13 September 1966 (aged 86); Brockley, Somerset, England
- Other name: Dora Caton Woodville
- Occupation: Actor
- Years active: 1916–1938
- Spouse: Anthony Caton Woodville

Dora Barton (née Brockbank; 20 January 1880 – 13 September 1966) was an English actress who appeared in films between 1916 and 1938.

== Biography ==
She was the daughter of actress Mary Barton and the sister of actress Naomi Barton.

She married actor Anthony Caton Woodville—the son of Richard Caton Woodville Jr. and grandson of Richard Caton Woodville—in 1908 but they later divorced. They had a son, Humphrey Caton Woodville, an entomologist.

She died on 13 September 1966.

== Selected filmography ==
- Dr. Wake's Patient (1916)
- The Answer (1916)
- The Green Orchard (1916)
- The House Opposite (1917)
- The Infamous Lady (1928)
- The Bondman (1929)
- The Price of a Song (1935)
- The Cardinal (1936)
