= Souls Adrift =

1917 film directed by Harley Knoles

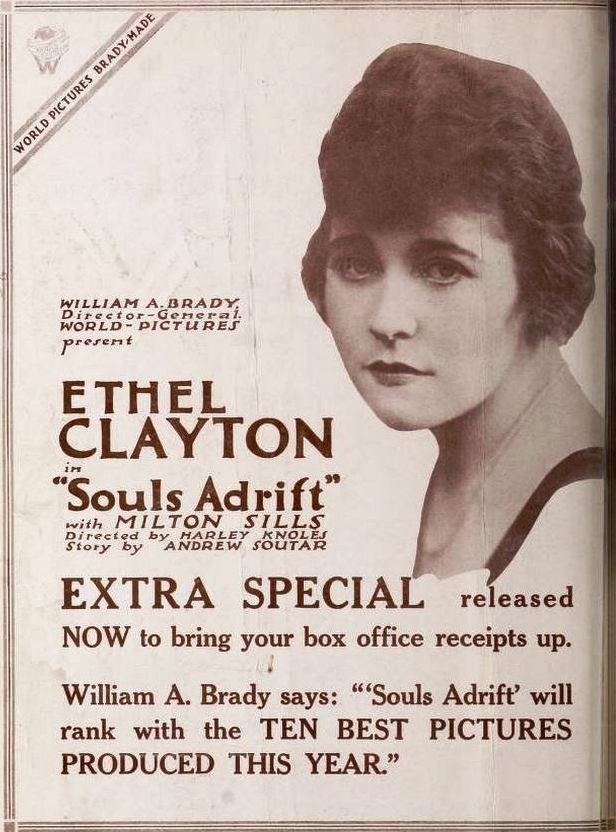
- Directed by: Harley Knoles
- Written by: Andrew Soutar
- Produced by: William A. Brady
- Starring: Ethel Clayton; Milton Sills; Frank DeVernon
- Cinematography: Arthur Edeson
- Production company: Peerless Productions
- Distributed by: World Film
- Release date: August 13, 1917
- Running time: 50 minutes
- Country: United States
- Languages: Silent; English intertitles

Souls Adrift is a 1917 American silent drama film directed by Harley Knoles and starring Ethel Clayton, Milton Sills and Frank DeVernon.

== Cast ==
- Ethel Clayton as Elma Raybourne
- Milton Sills as Micah Steele
- Frank DeVernon as Ambrose Raybourne
- John Davidson as Maberly Todd
- Walter James as A Swede Sailor

== Bibliography ==
- Monaco, James. The Encyclopedia of Film. Perigee Books, 1991.
