= His Parisian Wife =

1919 film by Emile Chautard

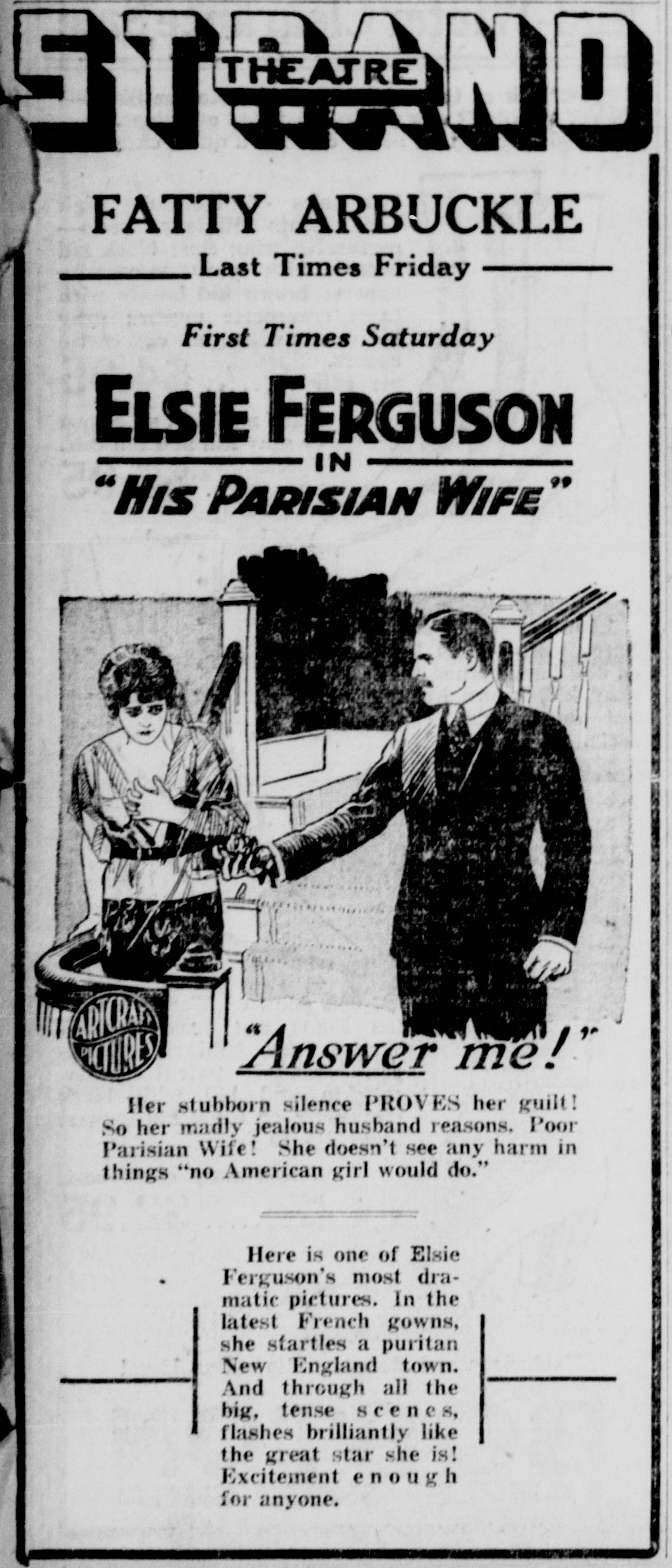
- Newspaper advertisement
- Directed by: Emile Chautard
- Written by: Andrew Soutar (novel); Eve Unsell (scenario)
- Produced by: Adolph Zukor; Jesse Lasky
- Starring: Elsie Ferguson
- Distributed by: Paramount Pictures
- Release date: January 19, 1919
- Running time: 50 minutes
- Country: United States
- Language: Silent (English intertitles)

His Parisian Wife is a lost 1919 silent film romantic drama produced by Famous Players–Lasky and distributed by Paramount Pictures. It was directed by Emile Chautard and starred Elsie Ferguson. The source for this picture was the novel The Green Orchard by Andrew Soutar.

== Plot ==
As described in a film magazine, Martin Wesley marries the young French woman Fauvette, but she is out of place in the cold New England setting he provides her. After he begins to suspect her due to the distrust of his puritan relatives, they separate. Fauvette becomes a famous author, but her generosity exceeds her income. She is having difficulties with a money lender when Martin returns to woo her again. They find their love revived in the more genial atmosphere of New York City.

== Cast ==
- Elsie Ferguson - Fauvette
- David Powell - Martin Wesley
- Courtenay Foote - Tony Rye
- Frank Losee - Thompson Wesley
- Cora Williams - Mrs. Wesley
- Charles W. Charles - Minister (as Captain Charles
- Louis R. Grisel - Lawyer (as Louis Grizel)

== See also ==
- The Green Orchard (1916)
