= Andrew Soutar =

British novelist and journalist (1879–1941)

- Born: 1879; Swindon, Wiltshire
- Died: 24 November 1941 (aged 61–62); Cornwall, England; United Kingdom
- Other name: Edward Andrew Stagg
- Occupations: Writer, Journalist

Andrew Soutar (1879 – 1941) was a British novelist and journalist.

== Biography ==
Born Edward Andrew Stagg, Soutar married Elspeth Soutar Swinton in 1907 at Prestwich, Lancashire adopting the name Soutar shortly after. Soutar was a correspondent, but is better known today for his novels, which were often serialized in newspapers. He also wrote pulp adventure stories for magazines. Soutar's stories proved very popular with filmmakers, with a number being made into films during the silent era.

== Selected novels ==
- Back From the Dead (London, 1920) was made into a 1925 film Back to Life

== Filmography ==
- The Black Night, directed by Harold Weston (UK, 1916, based on the novel The Black Night)
- The Green Orchard, directed by Harold Weston (UK, 1916, based on the novel The Green Orchard)
- The Streets of Illusion, directed by William Parke (1917, based on a story by Andrew Soutar)
- Souls Adrift, directed by Harley Knoles (1917, based on a story by Andrew Soutar)
- High Stakes, directed by Arthur Hoyt (1918, based on the short story High Stakes)
- The Great Game, directed by A. E. Coleby (UK, 1918, based on the novel The Straight Game)
- His Parisian Wife, directed by Émile Chautard (1919, based on the novel The Green Orchard)
- The Sealed Envelope, directed by Douglas Gerrard (1919, based on a story by Andrew Soutar)
- Snow in the Desert, directed by Walter West (UK, 1919, based on the novel Snow in the Desert)
- Other Men's Shoes, directed by Edgar Lewis (1920, based on the novel Other Men's Shoes)
- A Beggar in Purple, directed by Edgar Lewis (1920, based on the novel A Beggar in Purple)
- Courage, directed by Sidney Franklin (1921, based on a story by Andrew Soutar)
- The Imperfect Lover, directed by Walter West (UK, 1921, based on the novel The Imperfect Lover)
- Love's Redemption, directed by Albert Parker (1921, based on the short story On Principle)
- Was She Justified?, directed by Walter West (UK, 1922, based on the play The Pruning Knife)
- Hornet's Nest, directed by Walter West (UK, 1923, based on the novel Hornet's Nest)
- In the Blood, directed by Walter West (UK, 1923, based on the novel In the Blood)
- Back to Life, directed by Whitman Bennett (1925, based on the novel Back from the Dead)
- Romances of the Prize Ring, seven short films (UK, 1926, based on stories by Andrew Soutar)
- Butterflies in the Rain, directed by Edward Sloman (1926, based on the novel Butterflies in the Rain)
- The Phantom in the House, directed by Phil Rosen (1929, based on the novel The Phantom in the House)
- Worldly Goods, directed by Phil Rosen (1930, based on a story by Andrew Soutar)
- Almost Married, directed by William Cameron Menzies (1932, based on the novel The Devil's Triangle)
- The Man Called Back, directed by Robert Florey (1932, based on the novel Silent Thunder)

=== Screenwriter ===
- A Bag of Gold (UK, 1915, short film)
- I Hear You Calling Me (dir. A. E. Coleby, UK, 1919)
- A Gipsy Cavalier (dir. J. Stuart Blackton, UK, 1922)

== Bibliography ==
- Peter Brooker & Andrew Thacker. The Oxford Critical and Cultural History of Modernist Magazines: Volume II: North America 1894-1960. Oxford University Press, 2012.
