= Jean Vachon =

American actress

Jean Vachon (February 8, 1903 – February 2, 1989) was a motion picture actress whose career began in the silent film era. She was the daughter of Mrs. Rosemary Vachon of Los Angeles California.

Vachon is in the cast of For Sale (1924). In 1927 Vachon portrayed a maid servant in Two Arabian Knights.

She became engaged to Nate "Chase" Watt, unit business manager for the Caddo Film Company at the Metropolitan Studios., in June 1928. Watt was promoted from assistant director only a few days earlier. At the time of the couple's engagement Watt was working with Thomas Meighan on a new feature film. He met Vachon when she first began making films. Their wedding was performed at St. Basil's Church, Wilshire Boulevard and Harvard Boulevard, in Los Angeles.
