= First Unitarian Church of Rochester =

Unitarian congregation in New York, United States

Coordinates: 43°08′28″N 77°33′26″W

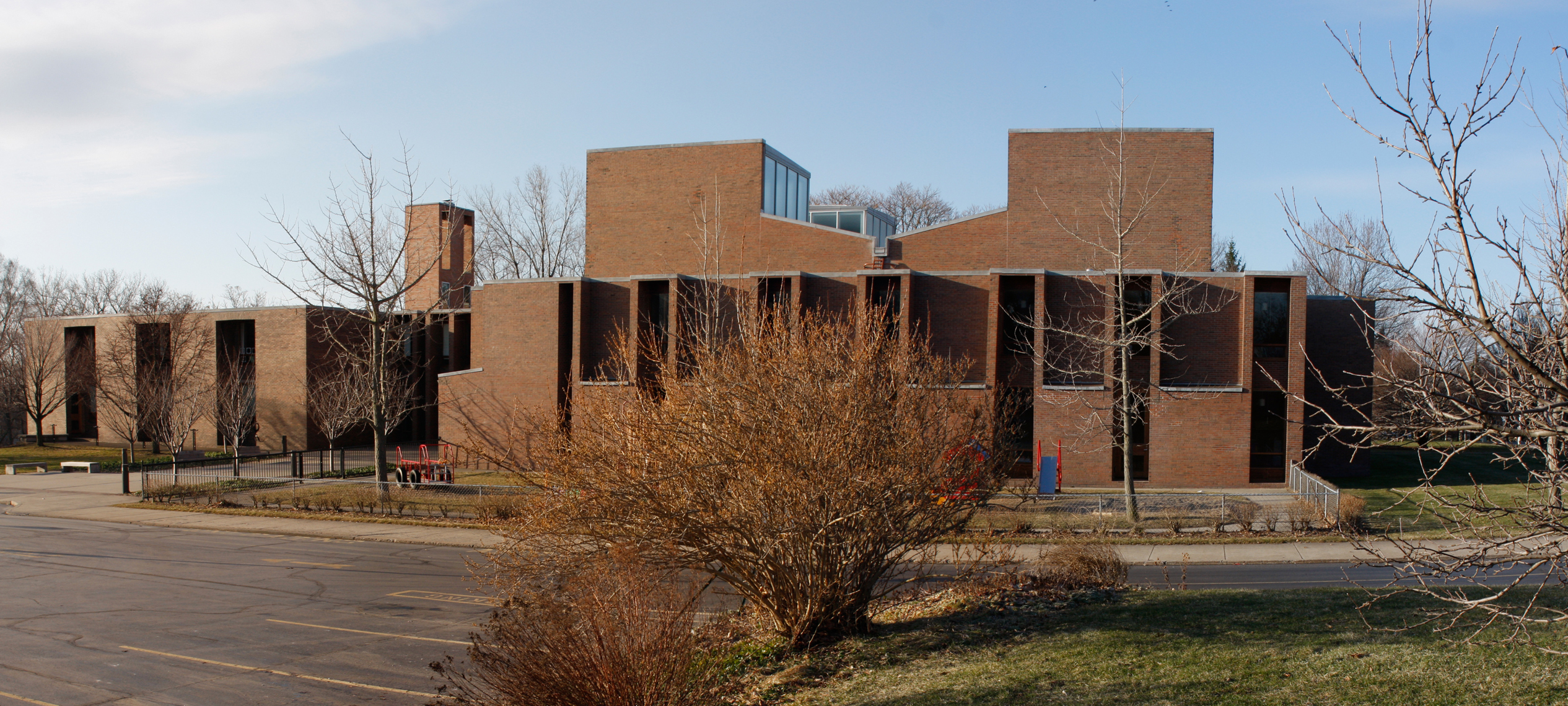
The congregation's modern-style First Unitarian Church of Rochester building, designed by Louis Kahn, was completed in 1962.

The First Unitarian Church of Rochester is a congregation located at 220 Winton Road South in Rochester, New York, U.S. The congregation is one of the largest in its denomination, the Unitarian Universalist Association. The non-creedal church conducts programs in the areas of spirituality, social concerns, music, and arts. This church is one of two Unitarian Universalist congregations in Monroe County, the other being First Universalist Church of Rochester.

The church was organized in 1829. Associated with social reform movements from its earliest days, it began attracting a group of reform activists from Quaker backgrounds in the 1840s, one of whom, Susan B. Anthony, became a national leader of the women's suffrage movement. After the first women's rights convention was held at Seneca Falls, New York in 1848, a follow-up convention, the Rochester Women's Rights Convention, was organized two weeks later at the First Unitarian Church of Rochester. Abigail Bush was elected to preside at this convention even though the idea of a woman chairing a public meeting was considered too daring even for some of the leaders of the emerging women's movement who were present.

Concern with social issues has been a recurring theme in the church's history. In the late 1800s the church provided evening classes and other activities for children in the church's low-income neighborhood. At the turn of the century, church members played leading roles in the campaign to open the University of Rochester to women and in the local, state, and national campaigns for women's suffrage. In the 1930s the church provided office space for Planned Parenthood when other accommodations were difficult to find. In 1988 the church began providing classroom support to Rochester city schools. In 2006 the church initiated a program to improve the quality of life in a small township in Honduras. In 2009 it established a talk line to offer non-judgmental support to women who have had abortions.

First Unitarian's building was designed by Louis Kahn and completed in 1962. It was described as one of "the most significant works of religious architecture of this century" in 1982 by Paul Goldberger, a Pulitzer-Prize-winning architectural critic.

== Congregation, beliefs, and programs ==
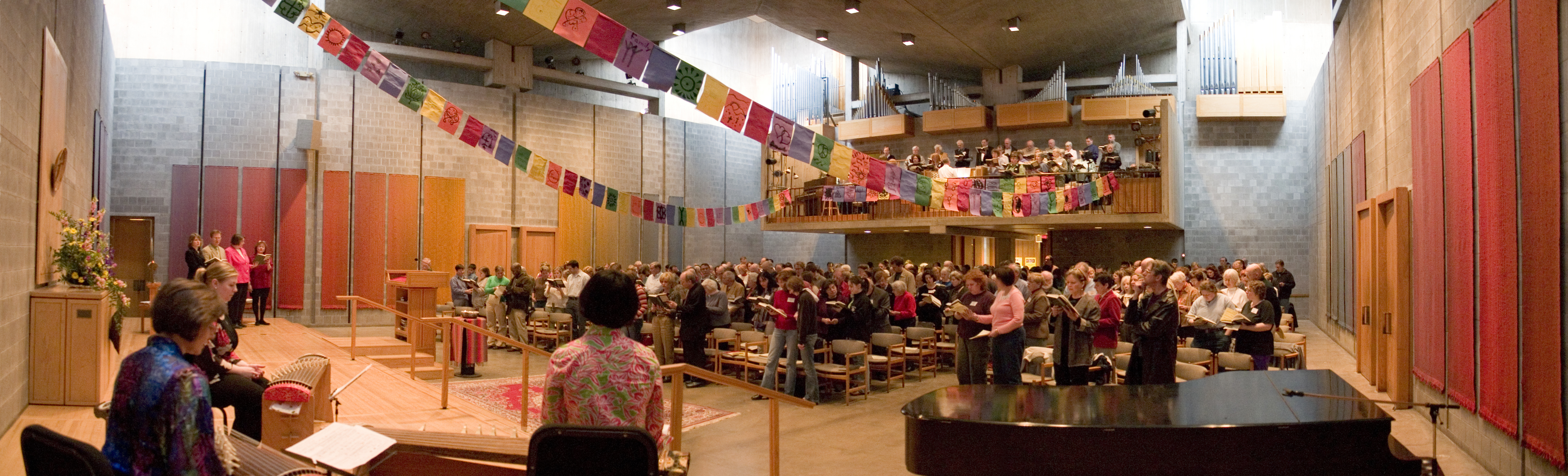
Sanctuary of First Unitarian Church of Rochester

The First Unitarian Church of Rochester in Rochester, New York, U.S., is one of the largest in its denomination, the Unitarian Universalist Association. Its senior minister is Rev. Shari Halliday-Quan, and its assistant minister is Rev. AJ van Tine. The church conducts two weekly worship services on Sundays and an occasional Saturday service.

The church is non-creedal, having, in the words of its web site, "No single religious text. No ten commandments. No creed to which you must agree ... This respect for individual particularity and openness to diverse sources of wisdom means our community is packed with a wide array of perspectives and beliefs." The church's mission statement is: "Through spiritual connection in community, we listen deeply to others and ourselves, open to wonder and transformation, and serve together with love and humility." The church school has a stated goal of encouraging children "to seek their own truths, to clarify their values, and to live lives of meaning inspired by those values."

The church operates on a Policy Governance system by which the board of trustees focuses on the long-term goals of the church while the parish minister oversees its operation. The board specifies the results expected from the parish minister and sets limits for his or her activities. The board does not specify how those expectations should be achieved, but it does evaluate the results. Officers of the church are elected by annual congregational meetings.

In the 1970s the church developed a task force system to coordinate its activities in the area of social concerns. Members interested in a specific activity gather signatures to qualify as one of the church's task forces, which, if approved by the congregation, will be eligible to receive funds from the church budget. Oversight is provided by the Social Justice Council, which is composed largely of representatives from the task forces. Through this system, the church sponsors projects that provide classroom support for Rochester schools, temporary shelter within the church for homeless families, free Sunday suppers at a Catholic Worker program, improvements to the quality of life in a small township in Honduras, and other projects that focus on such issues as peace, reproductive rights, and gay, lesbian, bisexual, and transgender concerns. The Council also oversees grant programs that provide financial support to community organizations.

The church's music and arts programs include a choir, a house band, a handbell choir, a drama group, a chamber music series, a coffee house, and an art gallery. Interest groups sponsored by the church include Soul Matters groups that focus on monthly worship themes, several types of meditation groups, Wellspring groups with programs of daily spiritual practice, Buddhist groups, qi gong, tai chi, book discussion groups, and several types of support groups.

== History ==
=== Early years ===
The First Unitarian Church of Rochester was organized in 1829.

The city of Rochester, located in western New York, was a young frontier boom town at the time, having been incorporated in 1817 and boosted by the completion of the Erie Canal in 1825. The American Unitarian Association, the Unitarian national body, was also young, having been formed in 1825 by Christians who rejected the doctrine of the Trinity.

Myron Holley

Rochester Unitarians operated in the early years without a settled minister and, except for a brief period, without a church building. Informal leadership was provided by Myron Holley, a former Commissioner of the Erie Canal and one of the founders of the Liberty Party, which advocated the abolition of slavery. An early church history gave Holley primary credit for the church's establishment.

In 1842 Rufus Ellis, at the age of twenty-two, agreed to come to Rochester to be the congregation's minister for a one-year period. Ellis lodged at the home of Dr. Matthew Brown, president of the congregation. Brown, who earlier was a member of the First Presbyterian Church, was one of Rochester's founders. Along with his brother, he had developed Brown's Race, the canal that delivered water power to Rochester's factory district. He also served as the first chairman of the board of supervisors of Monroe County, in which Rochester is located. Brown was an opponent of slavery; on the day in 1827 when slaves in New York State were emancipated, a delegation of African Americans visited Brown to thank him for his work to secure that legislation.

Funds were raised under Ellis' leadership for a new church building that was dedicated in 1843. In a letter to his brother, Ellis noted that "Forty-five of the pews are already sold or rented, and are occupied by 'correct' people." During Ellis' ministry the church approved a seal that contained an image of the Bible and the words "our Creed". Membership grew partly as a result of the Finney revival movement, which generated a wave of religious enthusiasm so strong in western New York that the area was sometimes called the "burned-over district." Not all churchgoers were comfortable with the new atmosphere in their congregations, however, and some transferred to the less doctrinaire Unitarian Church.

Frederick Holland, who became minister of First Unitarian in 1843, helped to stabilize the new congregation and increase its membership. He resigned in 1848 to assume leadership of the American Unitarian Association.

Dissention within the Quaker community eventually led some of its members to First Unitarian. When objections were raised to abolitionist activities, about 200 people withdrew from the regional Hicksite Quaker body in 1848 and formed an organization called the Congregational Friends. This group soon changed its name to the Friends of Human Progress and ceased to operate as a religious body, focusing instead on organizing annual meetings in Waterloo, New York that welcomed anyone interested in social reform, including "Christians, Jews, Mahammedans, and Pagans". In July 1848, a month after the split, four women associated with the Quaker dissidents met in Waterloo with anti-slavery activist Elizabeth Cady Stanton and issued a call for a Women's Rights Convention to be held a short distance away in Seneca Falls, thereby launching the modern women's rights movement. Organized on short notice, it nonetheless drew about 300 people, largely from the immediate area.

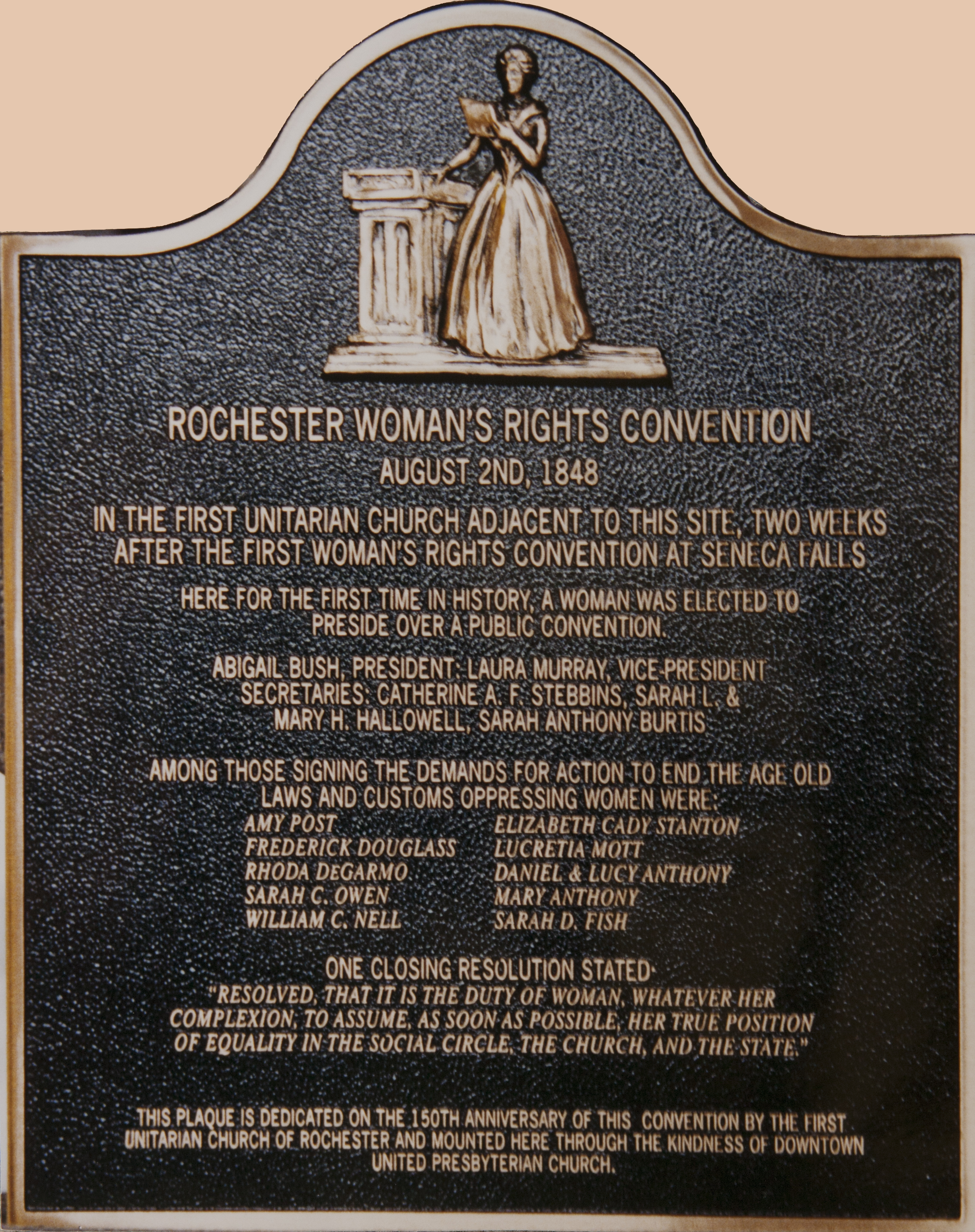
Plaque commemorating the Woman's Rights Convention at First Unitarian in 1848

Momentum from this event led to the organization of another women's rights convention two weeks later at the First Unitarian Church of Rochester, about 50 miles (80 km) west. The Rochester Convention took the significant step of electing a woman to preside, an idea that seemed so radical at the time that Elizabeth Cady Stanton and Lucretia Mott, two organizers of the Seneca Falls convention, opposed it and left the platform when Abigail Bush took the chair. She performed her duties without incident, and a precedent was established.

The convention at First Unitarian was organized mainly by a circle of activists in Rochester led by Amy and Isaac Post, who had resigned from their Hicksite Quaker congregation in the mid-1840s when opposition to the Post's abolitionist activities was raised in the Quaker congregation. Several members of this circle had participated in the Seneca Falls convention, including Mary Hallowell, Catherine Fish Stebbins, and Amy Post, who convened the meeting at First Unitarian. Some of the organizers of the Rochester convention were also associated with First Unitarian, including Hallowell, Stebbins and Post.

A church history written in 1929 said, "Our church was probably by strong majority abolitionist, an earnest group of Hicksite Quakers having attached themselves to the church as their own meeting grew inactive and faded out—the Anthonys, Hallowells, Willises, Posts, Fishes, etc."

Of these families, the Anthonys were particularly significant for First Unitarian. Daniel Anthony was born a Quaker but married Lucy Reid, a Baptist, a violation of Quaker rules for which he was required to apologize to his congregation in central New York. The congregation later disowned him for allowing a dance school to operate in his house. Despite this patchy relationship, the Anthony children were raised as Quakers. After the Anthonys moved to Rochester in 1845, their homestead became the Sunday afternoon gathering place for progressive Quakers and other social reformers in the area. Both Daniel and Lucy Anthony attended the Women's Rights Convention at First Unitarian along with Mary, one of their daughters. Sarah Anthony Burtis, a relative, served as its acting secretary.

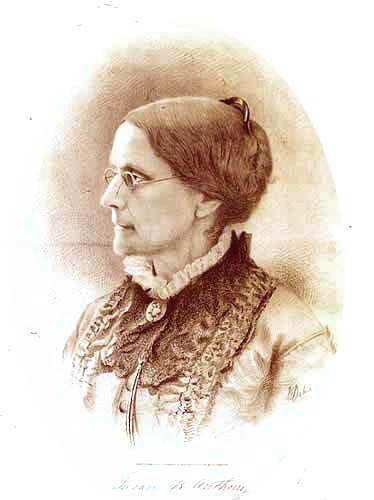
Susan B. Anthony

Susan B. Anthony, another Anthony daughter, was teaching school in central New York at the time and had little involvement with any of these activities. When she returned to Rochester in 1849, she found her family attending worship services at First Unitarian. She joined her family there, making it her church home and her most significant source of local connections until her death more than 50 years later. Susan B. Anthony was listed as a member of First Unitarian in a church history written in 1881. Although she no longer attended Quaker meetings in Rochester after the 1848 split, she never relinquished her membership there.

Susan B. Anthony is best known as an organizer and campaigner for women's rights, but she promoted other social reforms as well. In 1851 she helped sponsor an anti-slavery convention at First Unitarian. In 1852 she helped bring 500 women to Rochester to create the Women's State Temperance Society, of which she became the state agent. In 1853 she organized a Women's Rights Convention in Rochester with the assistance of the minister of First Unitarian. In 1857 she served as clerk of the Friends of Human Progress, the social reform group created by dissident Quakers and also became upstate New York agent for the American Anti-Slavery Society. She helped organize two more anti-slavery conventions in Rochester, one of which was so threatened by mob violence that she and her associates had to be escorted from the building by police for their own safety. Anthony's reform work, especially in the national campaign for women's right to vote, led her to spend most of her subsequent years on the road until advancing age required her to cut back on traveling and settle once again in Rochester.

After Rev. Holland's departure from First Unitarian in 1848, the congregation entered a period of discord and short-term ministries that lasted until after the Civil War. A history of the church written in 1881 notes that some of its members during that period "were persons of extreme and pronounced opinions, sharply opposed to each other on political and social questions," with slavery a key item of contention. There was also tension between the membership and some of the ministers of that period, not all of whom were as liberal as the congregation and one of whom went on to become a chaplain in the Confederate Army.

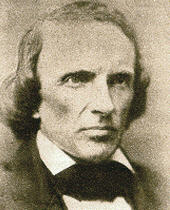
William Henry Channing

A prominent minister of First Unitarian during this unsettled period was William Henry Channing, who served from 1853 to 1854. Nationally known as a supporter of social reform, he attended the first National Woman's Rights Convention in Worcester, Massachusetts in 1850 and served on the central committee that coordinated national conventions and other women's rights activities in the following years. In Rochester he worked closely with Susan B. Anthony, writing the call for the Women's Rights Convention she organized there in 1853 and playing a leading role in it. At the 1854 New York State Women's Rights Convention in Albany, which Anthony also organized, he, along with Ernestine Rose, presented petitions to the New York State Assembly that the movement had gathered. He wrote one of the two appeals that Anthony circulated as part of her women's suffrage work in New York state.

Channing wrote a brief inspirational text that has become known as "Channing's Symphony," which reads: "To live content with small means; to seek elegance rather than luxury, and refinement rather than fashion; to be worthy, not respectable, and wealthy, not rich; to listen to stars and birds, babes and sages, with open heart; to study hard; to think quietly, act frankly, talk gently, await occasions, hurry never; in a word, to let the spiritual, unbidden and unconscious, grow up through the common – this is my symphony."

Channing was important to the Anthony family. Mary Anthony said "The liberal preaching of William Henry Channing in 1852 proved so satisfactory that it was not long before this was our accepted church home." Susan B. Anthony's sense of spirituality was influenced by Channing. Her friend and co-worker Elizabeth Cady Stanton said in 1898, "She first found words to express her convictions in listening to Rev. William Henry Channing, whose teaching had a lasting spiritual influence upon her. To-day Miss Anthony is an agnostic. As to the nature of the Godhead and of the life beyond her horizon she does not profess to know anything. Every energy of her soul is centered upon the needs of this world. To her, work is worship ... Her belief is not orthodox, but it is religious." Anthony expressed the latter thought in these words: "Work and worship are one with me. I can not imagine a God of the universe made happy by my getting down on my knees and calling him 'great.'"

Channing had little success with his factionalized congregation. Finding that he could attract larger audiences when he spoke outside the church than within it, he even considered making a fresh start by forming a movement separate from the church. Instead he left the city for other posts, serving as chaplain of the U.S. House of Representatives during the Civil War.

The church declined afterwards, sometimes finding it difficult to pay its ministers, none of whom served for long. In 1859 the church's building was destroyed by fire. Rochester Unitarians were once again without either minister or building, a situation that was not resolved until after the Civil War."

=== After the Civil War ===
Frederick Holland, who had served as First Unitarian's minister in the 1840s, returned in 1865 as minister for an additional three years to help the congregation band together and construct a new church building, which was dedicated in 1866.

The ministry of Newton Mann, who served from 1870 to 1888, was a period of stability and growth. Mann was interested in science. He owned a telescope, served a term as president of the Rochester Academy of Science and was especially interested in evolution. Mann discussed the religious significance of Charles Darwin's recently published book on evolution in a sermon delivered in Cincinnati just before the Civil War which, according to the Rochester History journal, was the first such sermon in the U.S. In 1872 Mann initiated the first public controversy over evolution in Rochester by inviting a professor to give a series of lectures on that topic at First Unitarian, which were extensively reported. In a sermon in 1874 that was also reported in the press, Mann extended the concept of evolution into the realm of religion, asserting that evolution operates on the soul as people become increasingly aware of their spiritual environment and respond by developing their spiritual capabilities.

Mann supported the idea that the Bible has a human rather than a supernatural origin in A Rational View of the Bible, written in 1879, saying that a rational approach to the Bible makes it more appealing by giving it "a purely human quality which quite atones for all the mistakes it contains."

In 1870 Mann was invited to give an evening lecture at Temple B'rith Kodesh, Rochester's oldest and largest synagogue. This interfaith event, the first of its type in Rochester, contributed to a formal split between reformers and traditionalists within B'rith Kodesh and, according to The Jewish Community in Rochester by Stuart Rosenberg, "shook the Jewish community in America and even had reverberations abroad." First Unitarian and B'rith Kodesh held a joint Thanksgiving service in 1871, and Rabbi Landsberg and Rev. Mann began the practice of exchanging pulpits, with each delivering the sermon for the other's congregation. A history of B'rith Kodesh describes the relationship between the two congregations during this period as "extremely close". In 1874 First Unitarian, B'rith Kodesh, and the First Universalist Church of Rochester began their continuing tradition of holding annual Union Thanksgiving services. In 1883 Mann helped Landsberg with part of his project to translate a new prayer book from Hebrew to English. Their translation of the song "Yigdal" has been included in the Union Hymnal of Reform Judaism and in hymnals of other denominations, including the Presbyterian Hymnal (1990). In 1884 Landsberg occupied the pulpit at First Unitarian for seven weeks while Mann was ill, attracting visitors from other denominations and, according to an early Rochester history, leading to speculation about the development of a universal church. The congregation of B'rith Kodesh used First Unitarian as a temporary home in 1909 after their building was destroyed by fire.

In 1872 Susan B. Anthony convinced the election inspectors in her ward in Rochester that the recently enacted Fourteenth Amendment, which guaranteed equal protection to all citizens, implicitly gave women the right to vote. When the news spread that Anthony and her three sisters had succeeded in registering to vote, other women in Rochester also registered. Of the two dozen or so whose names are known, at least three worshiped with Anthony at First Unitarian. Mrs. Mann, the wife of First Unitarian's minister, attempted to register in her ward but was refused. On election day, only fifteen of those who had registered, including Anthony, were actually permitted to vote, and then only because the election inspector in that ward, a long-time abolitionist, defied orders and allowed them to do so. Susan B. Anthony was arrested for voting and found guilty in a widely publicized trial that generated protests across the country.

In 1878 the annual meeting of the National Woman Suffrage Association, which was founded by Susan B. Anthony and Elizabeth Cady Stanton, convened at the First Unitarian Church of Rochester on the thirtieth anniversary of the first Women's Suffrage Convention in Seneca Falls.

In 1883 First Unitarian vacated its building to make way for the construction of a new post office. To replace it, the congregation purchased an existing church building from the Third Presbyterian Church of Rochester, which had moved to another location.

=== Gannett ministry ===
William Channing Gannett served as minister from 1889 to 1908. He came from a prominent Unitarian family, his father, Ezra Stiles Gannett, having written the constitution for the American Unitarian Association and served as its first secretary. William Channing Gannett himself had gained prominence as a leader of the successful movement within the denomination to end the practice of binding it by a formal creed, thereby opening its membership to non-Christians and even to non-theists. While pastor of a Unitarian church in Wisconsin before coming to Rochester, he had served as vice president of that state's women's suffrage association.

Mary Thorn Lewis Gannett, Rev. Gannett's wife, was "very nearly his co-pastor," according to a church history. Coming from a Philadelphia Quaker background, she never relinquished her membership there, attending Quaker meetings whenever she visited Philadelphia. In Rochester, however, she was active in the First Unitarian Church and assisted in the formation of several community organizations.

The Gannetts focused their energy on social issues. Urging the congregation to be "a seven-day instead of a one-day church", Rev. Gannett encouraged it to become more involved with its downtown neighborhood of low-income immigrants.

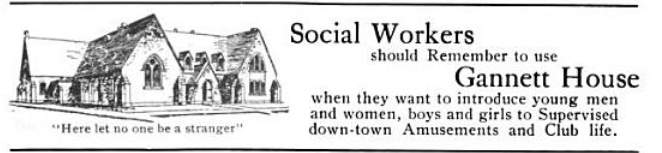
Advertisement for Gannett House, the church's parish house and the home of the Boys' Evening Home

The Gannetts accordingly initiated the Boys' Evening Home, which opened in 1890 in the church's parish house. Within three months its membership had grown to 95 even though some of its members had to leave because they had been sentenced to the State Industrial School. By 1893 the Home had a paid superintendent and was teaching classes in manual arts and drawing, and by 1898 its offerings had expanded to include such subjects as current events, zoology, literature and journalism. A small newspaper produced by the boys campaigned against penny slot machines, which were illegal gambling devices that could be found in candy stores. The neighborhood boys came largely from Polish and Russian Jewish immigrant families. When they reached their late teens, several members of the Boys' Evening Home formed the Judean Club in Rochester, which eventually became, according to Rosenberg's The Jewish Community in Rochester, "the most important cultural forum in the Jewish community of that time." At least four members of the Boys' Evening Home went on to become rabbis, one of whom credited Rev. Gannett with helping him choose that profession. Benjamin Goldstein, another member, became executive secretary of Temple B'rith Kodesh. Another former member, Meyer Jacobstein, was elected to the House of Representatives in Washington. Volunteers from B'rith Kodesh assisted the work of the Boys' Evening Home.

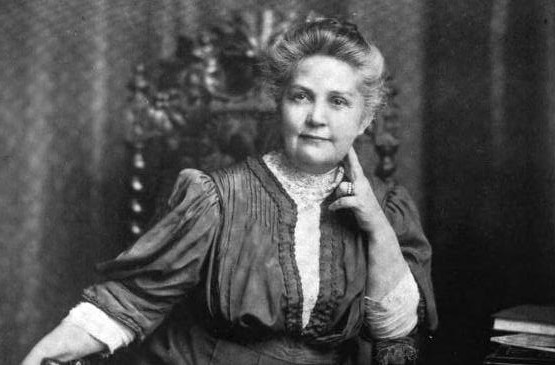
Mary Gannett

From 1889 to 1908 Mary Gannett led First Unitarian's Women's Alliance, through which "much of the church's activity was organized and executed". About 1902 the Women's Alliance opened the Neighborhood Friendly for Girls, which provided classes in housekeeping, cooking, and sewing for girls in the church neighborhood.

The Gannetts sponsored the formation of the Unity Club in 1889, which was initiated by the Women's Alliance but was open to anyone in Rochester. With as many as a hundred members, it was divided into small classes under the tutelage of the Gannetts for the intensive study of such thinkers as Thoreau, Hawthorne, George Eliot, and the Fabians. The secretary of the Social Topics class, which examined social problems of the day, was Emma Sweet, a member of First Unitarian who was Susan B. Anthony's secretary.

In 1889 Mary Gannett established the Woman's Ethical Club, an interfaith organization that discussed the ethical aspects of social topics and campaigned for the admission of women to the University of Rochester. By the middle of the 1890s, the Ethical Club was attracting several hundred women to its meetings.

Other members of First Unitarian engaged in social and political work during the Gannett years. Mary Anthony, sister of Susan B. Anthony, was active in many aspects of church life and was also deeply involved with the campaign for women's rights. In 1885 a group of women gathered at her home to establish the Women's Political Club, later known as the Political Equality Club. This group of about forty women achieved several breakthroughs, including the appointment of Rochester's first police matron, the placement of women doctors on the city's health staff, and the appointment of women to state institutional boards. Mary Anthony became president of the club in 1892 and served in that capacity for eleven years. Mary Gannett was a member of the club for over twenty years and held various offices.

In 1891 African American activist Hester C. Jeffrey moved to Rochester. She joined Rochester's AME Zion Church and helped organize women's clubs in the African American community. She also developed strong ties to First Unitarian, often attending services there and forming close friendships with Susan B. Anthony and Mary Gannett. She joined the Political Equality Club and created a suffrage club for African American women called the Susan B. Anthony Club. In 1895, while keeping her membership in AME Zion, she also became a member of First Unitarian.

In 1891, at the age of 71, Susan B. Anthony decided to limit her work that required travel and to settle into the house she shared with her sister Mary in Rochester. She resumed routine attendance at First Unitarian, formally signed its membership book, and deepened her friendships with Rev. William and Mary Gannett. Later that year she was invited to speak at the annual Union Thanksgiving service, which was held that year at First Unitarian. Its theme was "The Unrest of the Times a Cause for Thankfulness". Anthony spoke on the women's movement.

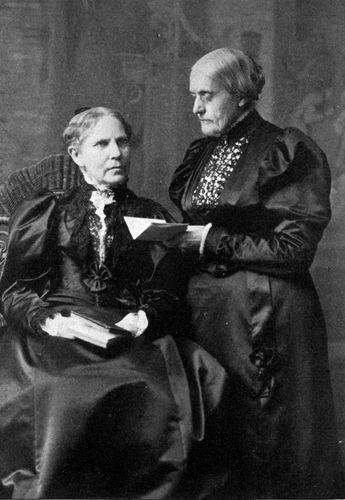
Mary and Susan B. Anthony

In 1893 Susan B. Anthony became the main force behind the formation of the Rochester branch of the Women's Educational and Industrial Union, which worked for the educational and social advancement of women. Mary Gannett presided at the founding meeting and became the chair of its Legal Protection Committee, often becoming personally involved in protecting working women from dishonest employers. In 1911 she became president of the organization.

In 1893 Mary Anthony became corresponding secretary of the New York State Woman Suffrage Association. During the statewide drive that year for the right of women to vote in New York elections, the Anthony home was converted into campaign headquarters, with public offices in the parlor and other activities throughout the rest of the house. The campaign for women's suffrage in New York state eventually succeeded, becoming law in 1918 and providing momentum for the passage of the Nineteenth Amendment nationally in 1920.

In 1898 Susan B. Anthony called and chaired a meeting of 73 local women's societies to form the Rochester Council of Women, later known as the Rochester Federation of Women's Clubs. At its first meeting it renewed the campaign to elect a woman to the local school board even though women were still not allowed to vote. Mary Gannett, speaking for both the Council of Women and the Women's Educational and Industrial Union, played a major role in this campaign, which succeeded when both major parties were convinced to nominate the same woman. The Council of Women's consumer's committee, headed by Mrs. Max (Miriam) Landsberg of B'rith Kodesh and Mary Gannett, developed into the local chapter of the National Consumers League.

The long campaign to open the University of Rochester to women students involved several members of First Unitarian and organizations they had helped to create. The Democrat and Chronicle, a local newspaper, writing several years after the event, said that next to Susan B. Anthony, Mary Gannett was chiefly responsible for the success of this campaign.

Susan B. Anthony had formed a committee as early as 1879 to pressure the university to admit women, but without success. In 1889 the Women's Political Club renewed the campaign with a series of articles in local newspapers. During a meeting in 1891 at the Anthony home, university officials agreed to admit women if $200,000 could be raised to defray costs. The Women's Ethical Club initiated a fund-raising drive, and Susan B. Anthony and Rev. William Channing Gannett appealed for contributions at a public meeting at the Chamber of Commerce. This drive, however, was unsuccessful.

In 1898 the university once again agreed to admit women if enough money could be raised and in 1899 lowered the necessary amount to $50,000. Most of that amount had already been raised, with Mary Gannett playing a leading role in that effort. Just after Susan B. Anthony returned home from a trip to Wyoming, however, she was informed the evening before the deadline that the drive was still $8000 short. With seemingly no possibility of raising additional money, and with renewed opposition among the university trustees, this drive seemed to have failed also. Determined to succeed, Susan B. Anthony, at the age of 81, rode the next morning in a carriage in a last-minute push to close the funding gap, which she accomplished by raising the entire amount from members of First Unitarian, including herself and her sister Mary.

Although Susan B. Anthony worked on several local projects during this period, she remained deeply involved in national activities as president of the National American Woman Suffrage Association, working for an amendment to give women the right to vote. Generally known as the Anthony Amendment, it became the Nineteenth Amendment to the U.S. Constitution in 1920. When the Anthony sisters traveled to Berlin in 1904 for the founding of the International Woman Suffrage Alliance, Susan B. Anthony was declared its first member and Mary Anthony its second.

=== Early to mid-1900s ===
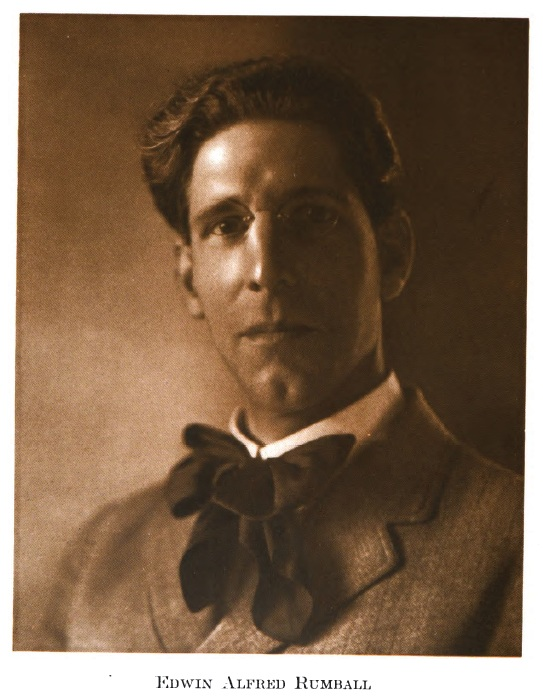
Edwin Rumball

Edwin A. Rumball, who served as minister from 1908 to 1915, continued the orientation toward social service that had been established in the Gannett years. In 1910 the church's parish house was expanded to provide better quarters for the Boys' Evening Home and was named Gannett House to honor Rev. Gannett, who had retired two years earlier.

From 1910 to 1914 Rumball edited The Common Good, which "emerged as Rochester's leading journal of progressive reform" according to Affirming the Covenant: A History of Temple B'rith Kodesh by Peter Eisenstadt. The magazine began in 1907 as the house bulletin of the Baden Street Settlement House, which was founded by the Temple B'rith Kodesh Sisterhood to serve a neighborhood of mostly Jewish immigrants. When Rumball became editor in 1910, it expanded into a monthly journal devoted to social betterment of the city. Campaigning for such things as cleaner milk supplies and better conditions for factory workers, the publication was fatally weakened when a strike in the local clothing industry created an atmosphere of bitterness that led to a sharp decline in advertising revenues, which in turn led to the magazine's demise in 1914.

Rumball became the secretary of the Rochester City Club when it was formally organized in 1910 to provide programs for weekly luncheons at a downtown hotel. Membership grew to be in the hundreds, and the programs, which included such speakers as Jane Addams and Felix Frankfurter, often made headline news. Women, who had their own Women's City Club, were expected to listen from the balcony. Mary Gannett created a stir by inviting two African American men to sit with her in the balcony who later joined the club as regular members. She was also invited to accompany two speakers to the platform: anarchist Emma Goldman and African American scholar and activist W. E. B. Du Bois. She joined the club herself when membership was opened to women in 1937.

Frank Doan became the minister of First Unitarian in 1922. Formerly a professor at the Meadville Unitarian seminary, he was one of the originators of the religious humanism movement within the denomination. He retired in 1925 at the age of 48 because of ill health and died two years later.

David Rhys Williams was minister from 1928 to 1958. He served as president of the Unitarian Fellowship for Social Justice, advocated Soviet-American cooperation, promoted the American Civil Liberties Union and supported several national legal defense campaigns. In 1933 Williams became one of the 34 signers of the Humanist Manifesto, which, among other things, declared the universe to be self-existing and not created, rejected the duality between mind and body, and called for religion to be reformed in light of the scientific spirit.

Williams was an advocate of family planning and served on the executive committee of the local Birth Control League. The federal Comstock laws made it difficult at that time to be closely associated with any aspect of birth control. When Margaret Sanger, a national leader of the family planning movement, spoke at Temple B'rith Kodesh in 1932, she was arrested for answering a question from the audience about where birth control devices could be obtained. Williams preached a sermon on "The Spiritual Significance of Voluntary Motherhood" and invited Sanger to speak from the pulpit at First Unitarian a few weeks after she was arrested. A group of eight women, including Wilma Lord Perkins from First Unitarian, subsequently formed an organization that eventually became Planned Parenthood of Rochester/Syracuse. When the organization found it difficult to obtain office space elsewhere, First Unitarian provided them space in Gannett House from 1934 to 1937.

In 1933 a group of Quakers began meeting in the home of Mary Gannett for the purpose of reestablishing a formal presence in Rochester, where the last Quaker organization had disbanded in 1915. The new Quaker group began holding worship services the following year in Gannett House, First Unitarian's parish house. Gannett encouraged the new organization while continuing to devote her support activities to the First Unitarian Church of Rochester.

In 1940 Time magazine gave the church national publicity with an article about its ordination of James Ziglar Hanner as a Unitarian minister in an unusual ceremony that included two rabbis. Rabbi Phillip S. Bernstein of B'rith Kodesh gave Hanner his pastoral charge, basing it on the Hebrew text The Ethics of the Fathers. The service closed with the singing of Yigdal, the hymn that had been translated from Hebrew to English in 1883 by Rabbi Landsberg of B'rith Kodesh and Rev. Mann of First Unitarian. Rev. Hanner began his ministry in Massachusetts.

In 1953, during the McCarthy period, Williams' brother, Albert Rhys Williams, was accused by the House Un-American Activities Committee of having supported the Communist Party from 1919 to 1929. Rev. Williams supported his brother and criticized his attackers. Thirteen members of the congregation accused Williams of being soft on Communism and attempted to have him dismissed from the pulpit. When the issue was put to a congregational vote, the only votes against Williams were the thirteen who had made the accusation, all of whom subsequently left the church. A prominent member of First Unitarian who supported Williams during this controversy was Frank Gannett, founder of the Gannett newspaper chain, who had campaigned for the Republican nomination to run against Franklin Delano Roosevelt in the 1940 presidential elections.

In 1957 several members of the congregation formed the Rochester Memorial Society, later called the Funeral Consumers Alliance of Greater Rochester, to encourage simple rather than ostentatious funeral services. By 1975 its membership had grown to over a thousand families. As of 2011, its mailing address continued to be the same as that of First Unitarian.

=== New building by Louis Kahn ===
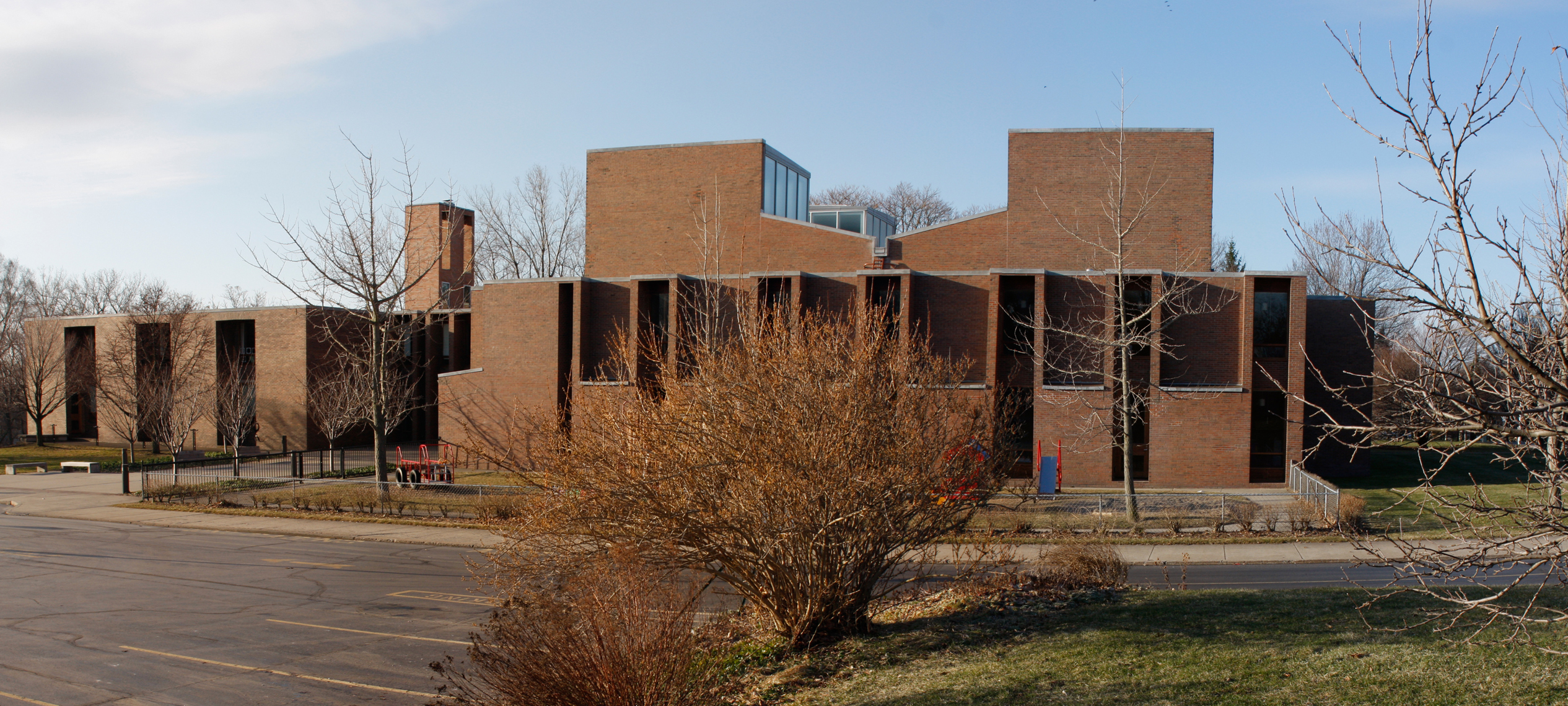
Louis Kahn's First Unitarian Church building

In 1958 Williams announced his intention to retire after 30 years of service. Three months later, while searching for his replacement, the church was informed that a project to build a downtown shopping mall would require the space occupied by their building, forcing the church to deal with two major issues at the same time.

The existing building had several deficiencies, and the church had been wrestling with problems of growth. Church committees had been investigating several alternatives including expanding the existing building, constructing a new church school, establishing daughter congregations, and purchasing the building that Temple B'rith Kodesh was vacating.

The church voted to sell their building to the Midtown Plaza developers in January 1959 with the understanding that they could continue to occupy it until July 1961. Construction activity nearby, however, soon weakened the building, forcing the congregation to move in September 1959. The church held Sunday services at the Dryden Theatre of the George Eastman House until a new building could be constructed.

First Unitarian's previous building was architecturally significant, having been designed by Richard Upjohn, the first president of the American Institute of Architects. The church decided to replace it with a building designed "by a leading 20th century architect, giving the community a notable example of contemporary architecture." The congregation voted to hire Louis Kahn in June 1959 to design their new building, which was completed in 1962.

=== Mid-1900s to present ===
In 1961 the American Unitarian Association and the Universalist Church of America merged to form the Unitarian Universalist Association. The possibility of merging Rochester's First Unitarian and First Universalist churches, which had conducted a joint church school in the 1950s and whose buildings had been only a block apart before the old Unitarian church was demolished two years earlier, was considered but not acted upon.

William Jenkins was minister from 1959 to 1963 and also served as president of the newly merged Unitarian Universalist Ministers' Association. Robert West was minister from 1963 until 1969, when he resigned to become president of the Unitarian Universalist Association.

In 1963 the church's Social Action Committee played the key role in creating Community Interests, Inc, an organization that provided minority families with housing loans. That organization was later absorbed by the Monroe County Housing Council.

In 1964 rapid growth in membership led the church to begin offering two Sunday worship services and church school sessions, with classes for older children relocated to the Harley School to ease crowding. Despite having originally informed Kahn that there would be no need to design the church to accommodate future enlargement, the church trustees decided in September 1964, less than two years after it was completed, to expand the building. Louis Kahn was hired once again as architect, and the addition was completed in May 1969.

Richard Gilbert served as minister from 1970 until his retirement in 2002. Gilbert became one of the signers of the Humanist Manifesto II in 1973. During the 1970s Gilbert was a member of the Clergy Consultation Service on Abortion, a group of ministers and rabbis who helped women find safe abortions at a time when it was still illegal.

In 1980 Gilbert wrote The Prophetic Imperative: Unitarian Universalist Foundations for a New Social Gospel, a book used in seminars given by the denomination's Social Justice Empowerment Program. In 1983 Gilbert published the first of three volumes of Building Your Own Theology, a guidebook for examining and clarifying personal values and beliefs in a group setting. It became the most widely used adult education curriculum within the denomination.

In 1982 church member Joyce Gilbert called a meeting that led to the formation of the Unitarian Universalist Musicians Network. She and Ed Schell, First Unitarian's Minister of Music, served first as members of the organizing committee and then as presidents of the new organization. With a membership of several hundred, the organization played a major role in producing the denomination's new hymnals.

In 1988 the church volunteers began providing classroom support to Rochester city schools in a program called the UU/Schools Partnership.

Kaaren Anderson and Scott Tayler arrived as Parish Co-Ministers in 2004. In 2006 the church began its Greater Good Project, which asks members to cut their usual Holiday spending in half and contribute the other half to community projects. In its first year the congregation contributed $79,000, part of which was used to initiate the church's Honduras Project, which works to improve the quality of life in a small Honduras township.

In 2007 the church originated Wellspring, a program of spiritual deepening that has since been adopted by other Unitarian Universalist congregations.

In 2009 the church's Reproductive Rights Task Force began the process of establishing a talk line to offer "support without judgment" to women who have had abortions. Staffed by church volunteers and others in the community, the talk line, which is called Connect and Breathe, began operating in 2011. It operates in the eastern part of the U.S. in conjunction with a similar talk line that was already serving the western time zones.

Because of growth in membership, in 2010 the church began offering a Saturday worship service in addition to the two Sunday services.

In 2019, Shari Halliday-Quan was called as senior minister.

== See also ==
- National Register of Historic Places listings in Rochester, New York
