= Bits of Life =

1921 film

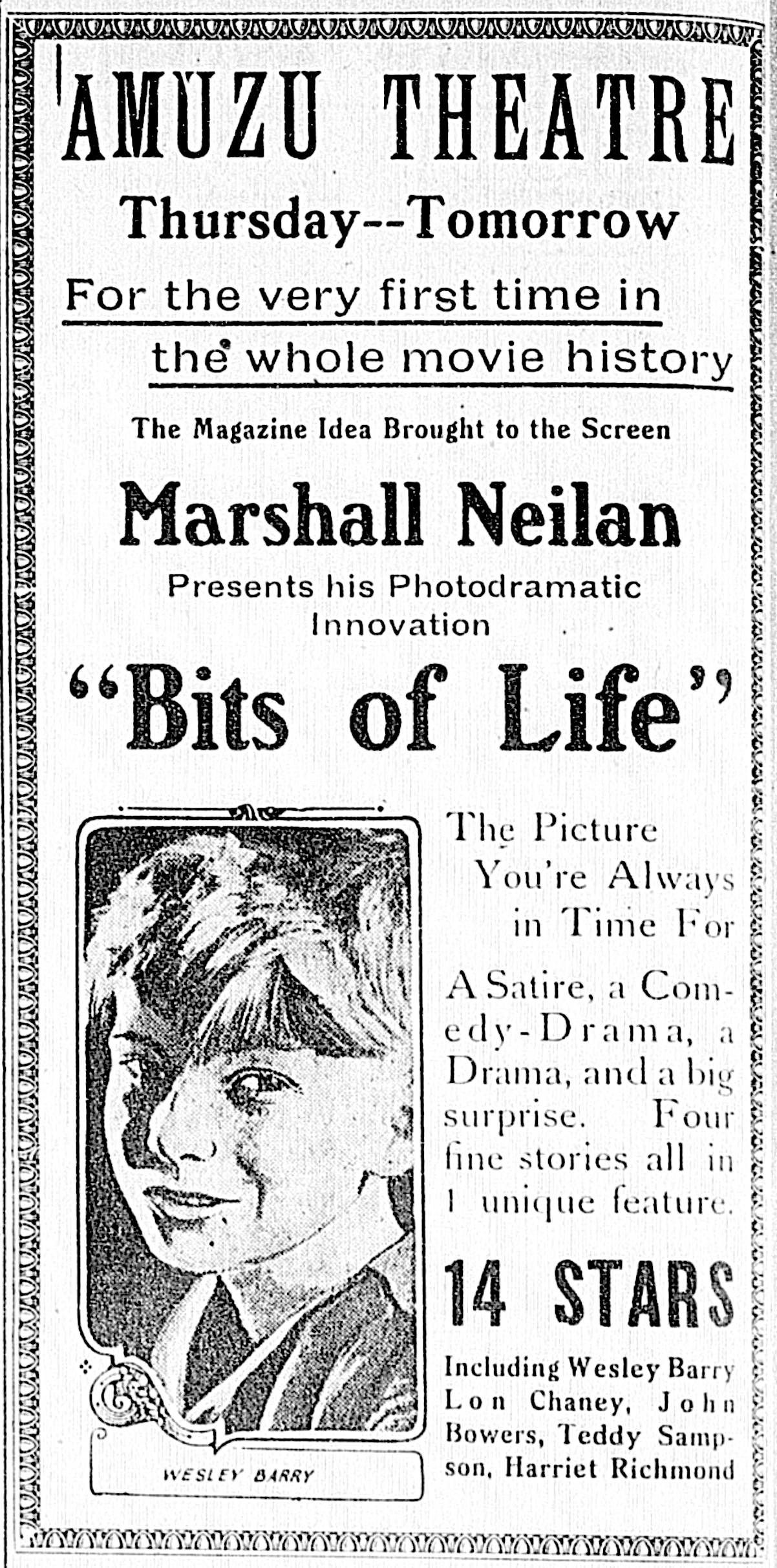
- Newspaper advertisement.
- Directed by: Marshall Neilan; James Flood (A.D.); William Scully (A.D.)
- Screenplay by: Lucita Squier
- Based on: Short stories by Thomas McMorrow, Walter Trumbull, Hugh Wiley, Marshall Nielan
- Produced by: Marshall Neilan
- Starring: Lon Chaney; Noah Beery Sr.; Anna May Wong
- Cinematography: Ray June; David Kesson
- Distributed by: Associated First National
- Release date: September 26, 1921
- Running time: 60 minutes approx.
- Country: United States
- Language: Silent (English intertitles)

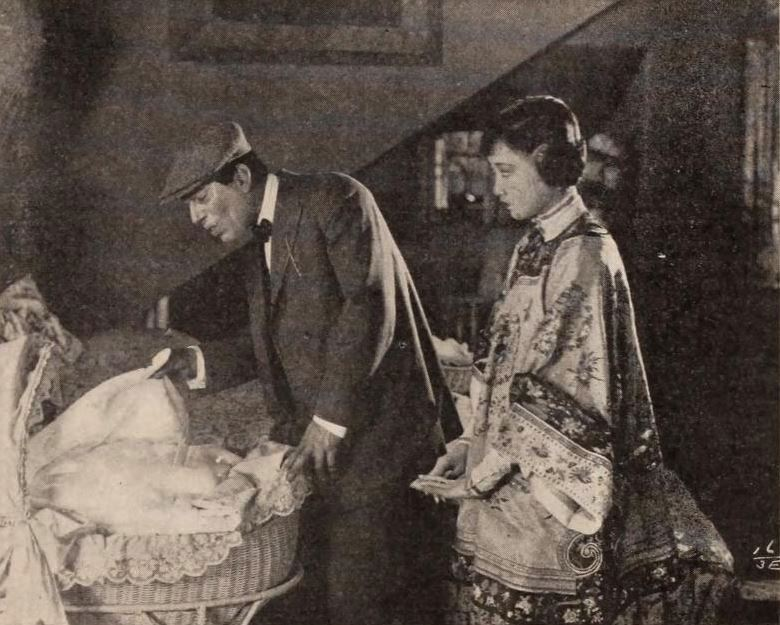
Lon Chaney as Chin Chow and Anna May Wong as Toy Sing, Chin Chow's wife

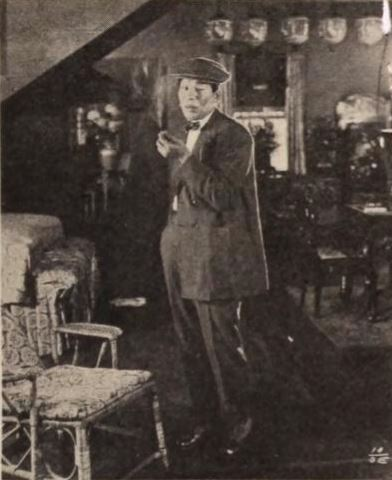
Lon Chaney as Chin Chow

Bits of Life is a 1921 American film produced and directed by Marshall Neilan. The cast included Lon Chaney and Noah Beery Sr. For her performance in this film, Anna May Wong received her first screen credit. It is notable as an early anthology film, comprising four short stories: “The Bad Samaritan” by Thomas McMorrow, “The Man Who Heard Everything” by Walter Trumbull, “Hop” by Hugh Wiley, and “The Intrigue” by Marshall Neilan. The four stories were unrelated, shot with different casts, by different directors, and at different times. The poster called the format "The Magazine Idea brought to the screen". (Chaney only appeared in the "Hop" episode.) The film's tagline was "The Social World! The Underworld! and San Francisco's Chinatown!".

Portions of the film were shot in San Francisco and at the Goldwyn Studios. The film premiered on August 9, 1921, at the Raymond Theatre in Pasadena, California. Buster Keaton, Marshal Neilan and Charles Chaplin attended the premiere. The film went into general release on September 26, 1921.

== Plot ==
The film is an anthology composed of four stories: "The Bad Samaritan", "The Man Who Heard Everything", "Hop", and "The Intrigue".

=== The Bad Samaritan ===
After an abusive childhood, Tom Levitt becomes a criminal. He meets a friend who has just been released from prison, who asks to borrow some money to help him leave town. Tom steals a wallet from a local pickpocket and gives his friend the cash within it. Later, Tom overhears a sermon about "The Good Samaritan" from a street preacher and decides to do a good deed for someone himself. He comes upon a man who has just been mugged and helps the man report the incident to the police. One of the officers notices the stolen wallet in Tom's possession, and he is arrested and convicted of stealing it. "That's what I get for being a Good Samaritan", he reflects in his jail cell.

=== The Man Who Heard Everything ===
Ed Johnson is a deaf barber who is married and feels comfortable with his life, in spite of his affliction. Ed is given a device that allows him to hear normally, and he is initially overjoyed. But soon he hears things that his friends are saying about him behind his back, and even learns that his wife has been cheating on him. Ed smashes the device and returns to his world of silence.

=== Hop ===
Chin Gow's father rejoiced when he was born, for boys brought good luck, whereas girl babies bring only misery. Three of Chin's sisters had been thrown into the Canton river at birth, and this barbaric custom horrified the young boy. When Chin reaches manhood, he moves to San Francisco where he opens a dozen opium dens. He falls in love with Toy Sing and wins her hand in marriage only after tricking her into believing he has quit the opium trade. Returning from a long trip to New York, he learns that Toy Sing has given birth to a daughter in his absence. He nearly strangles his wife to death when he learns that she has given him a girl baby. He threatens to slay the child, but first he goes into the next room to calm himself down with some opium. A friend arrives with a crucifix sent by the local priest as a good luck symbol. The friend nails it to the wall with a long spike and is shocked to see blood dripping down the wall. Racing to the next room, they discover that Chin Gow in his opium-induced coma had been leaning against the wall, and the spike was driven into the back of his skull, killing him instantly.

=== The Intrigue ===
Reginald Vanderbrook is on a yachting trip around the world when he meets a beautiful native girl on an island stopover. He follows her through the streets into a Hindu temple where some East Indian men call her "Princess". Suddenly a group of Hindus surround him and are about to kill him. But Reginald wakes up to find himself sitting in a dentist's chair, having a tooth pulled. The whole adventure turns out to be just a dream induced by anesthesia.

== Cast ==
- Wesley Barry as Tom Levitt (as a child)
- Rockliffe Fellowes as Tom Levitt (as an adult)
- Lon Chaney as Chin Gow
- Anna May Wong as Toy Sing, Chin Chow's Wife
- Noah Beery Sr. as Hindoo
- John Bowers as Dentist's Patient
- Teddy Sampson
- Dorothy Mackaill
- Edythe Chapman
- Frederick Burton
- James Bradbury Jr.
- Tammany Young
- Harriet Hammond
- James Neill

== Critics' Comments ==
"Director Marshal Neilan introduces a decided novelty to the screen in this film, made up of four short stories, all of which were too good to lose, but none of sufficient length to make a full feature in itself. Lon Chaney gives one of his wonderfully artistic character sketches as Chin Gow." ---Exhibitors Trade Review

"HOP is the third number. In this, Lon Chaney does another of his remarkable character impersonations...The manner in which fate squares matters is novel and dramatic." ---Moving Picture World

"Marshal Neilan has put over a real novelty in making a full-length feature out of a succession of detached stories, all of the utmost compactness and punch. Here are six reels of picture drama that fairly vibrate with action, suspense and surprise. Lon Chaney here plays another of those sensational roles of villainy." ---Variety

"Certainly unworthy of Neilan, from whom we are entitled to expect more. People walked out literally by the dozens." ---Moving Picture World

"Although without any particular cinematographic quality, all of the pictures are well made, like animated photographs, and the acting is above average. Lon Chaney as the Chinese of the third story gives a striking performance." ---The New York Times

== Preservation ==
With no prints of Bits of Life located in any film archives, it is considered a lost film. A still exists showing Lon Chaney in Asian makeup, strangling Anna May Wong.
