= Abigail Bush =

American abolitionist and women's rights advocate

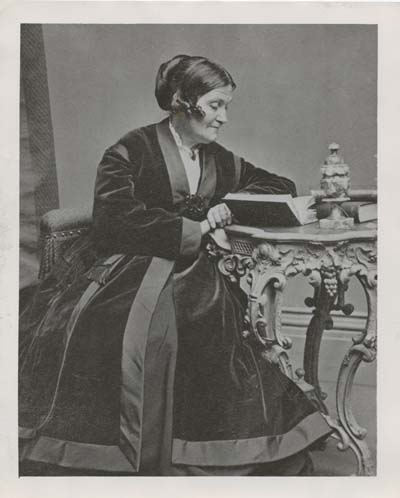
- Abigail Norton Bush
- Born: Abigail Norton; March 19, 1810; Cambridge, New York
- Died: December 10, 1898 (aged 88); Vacaville, California
- Burial place: Alhambra Pioneer Cemetery; 38.0182°N 122.1452°W
- Era: Women's Rights Movement
- Organization(s): Rochester Female Charitable Society; Western New York Anti-Slavery Society
- Known for: First woman to preside over a public meeting
- Spouse: Henry Bush (m. 1833)
- Children: 4
- Relatives: Bush family (through marriage)

Abigail Norton Bush (March 19, 1810 – December 10, 1898) was an abolitionist and women's rights activist in Rochester, New York. She served as president of the Rochester Women's Rights Convention, which was held in 1848 immediately after the first women's rights convention, the Seneca Falls Convention. By doing so, Bush became the first woman to preside over a public meeting composed of both men and women in the U.S.

== Early life ==
Abigail Norton was born on March 19, 1810, attended the orthodox First Presbyterian Church in Rochester, New York, and helped her mother with charitable works. In 1831, she converted to become a "Brick Church perfectionist" in the wake of popular evangelical revival meetings featuring Charles Grandison Finney. After conversion, she attended the Second Presbyterian Church, known as the "Brick Church", and worked with the Rochester Female Charitable Society, an organization that provided care for the poor and ill.

== Marriage and family ==
Abigail Norton married Henry Bush, the brother of Obadiah Bush (great-great grandfather of President George H. W. Bush) in 1833. Henry and his brother were stove manufacturers and radical abolitionists. Within five years, Abigail Bush's name stopped appearing in association with Brick Church activities. Over the next thirteen years, Bush went through childbirth six times, with four children living past infancy.

In a split among abolitionists in 1840, Henry Bush chose to remain with the American Anti-Slavery Society, the faction which accepted women as active members. Abigail Bush grew more sympathetic to radical reform and come-outerism, and withdrew in 1843 from the Brick Church to become active in the Western New York Anti-Slavery Society. Bush was at that time the most prominent ex-Evangelical woman in radical circles.

== Rochester Women's Rights Convention, 1848 ==
At the end of the Seneca Falls Convention in July 1848, convention-goers from Rochester (Bush did not attend) were moved to hold a similar convention of their own. They convinced Lucretia Mott to stay in New York long enough to be the featured speaker at their convention, as she had been at Seneca Falls.

In Rochester, an Arrangements Committee was chosen to organize the convention, and a small nominating committee was formed within it for the purpose of choosing convention officers. Amy Post, Rhoda DeGarmo and Sarah D. Fish met in the evening of August 1, 1848, to select a roster of officers composed wholly of females, with Abigail Bush to be president.

On the morning of August 2, 1848, in the Rochester Unitarian Church, Amy Post called the Rochester Women's Rights Convention to order and read the suggested slate of officers. The proposal for a woman to be the president of the convention met with immediate opposition. Elizabeth Cady Stanton, Mary Ann M'Clintock and Lucretia Mott were strongly against the idea of a woman president, not wanting a poor showing by women officers to give a bad public image to the new women's rights movement. They had been among the organizers of the Seneca Falls Convention, which had followed tradition by electing a man to preside. Stanton asked how could a woman, without knowledge of parliamentary procedure and without experience in holding public meetings, serve as president? Stanton, Mott and M'Clintock "were on the verge of leaving the Convention in disgust" when Post, Fish and DeGarmo convinced them that it could work. Bush was elected after a vote was taken among the audience, making her the first woman to preside over a public meeting composed of both men and women in the U.S.

When Bush took her position as president, Mott and Stanton left their places of honor on the platform and took seats in the audience. After an opening prayer by a male Free Will Baptist minister, one of the convention's three secretaries read the minutes of the previous Seneca Falls Convention. Cries of "louder, louder" were heard from audience members who could not discern the weakly sounded words of the secretary. Bush took the platform and said

Friends, we present ourselves here before you, as an oppressed class, with trembling frames and faltering tongues, and we do not expect to be able to speak so as to be heard by all at first, but we trust we shall have the sympathy of the audience, and that you will bear with our weakness now in the infancy of the movement. Our trust in the omnipotency of right is our only faith that we shall succeed.

Bush presided over all three sessions of the one day of convention. At a late hour, Bush adjourned the meeting "with hearts overflowing with gratitude." Lucretia Mott approached Bush and hugged her warmly, thanking her for presiding. Stanton apologized for her own "foolish conduct" in doubting the ability of Bush to succeed. From that point forward, women were always chosen president of women's rights conventions in the United States.

== Afterward ==
In late December 1848, Bush was a member of the business committee of the Western New York Anti-Slavery Society. Her contribution, and that of two other Rochester women, served to fulfill the Society's tenet of equal social participation of women.

In 1849 or 1850, Henry Bush, stung by years of business losses, headed west to seek his fortune in the California Gold Rush, and by the early 1850s, Abigail Bush joined him with their children. The family settled on a 600 acre ranch just south of the then border of Martinez, California in Contra Costa County, about 20 miles east of San Francisco. Her husband died in the late 1870s, at which time she sold the northern portion of the ranch to the Christian Brothers, who built their noviciate and began their wine making business.

In 1878, Bush sent a letter to the National Woman Suffrage Association (NWSA) convention in Rochester congratulating the women's movement on the 30th anniversary of the Seneca Falls and Rochester conventions: "Say to your convention my full heart is with them in all their deliberations and counsels, and I trust great good to women will come of their efforts."

In 1898, NWSA celebrated the 50th anniversary of the Seneca Falls and Rochester conventions, and honored Bush's early courage and strength during a session entitled "Pioneer's Evening". Bush was then 88 years old and still living in California; she wrote to Susan B. Anthony regarding her role at the 1848 convention in Rochester to say "I had not been able to meet in council at all with the friends, on account of sickness in my family until I met them in the hall as the congregation were gathering & then fell into the hands of those who urged me to take part with the supporters of a woman serving as the president of the meeting. They had James Mott, a fine-looking man, to preside at Seneca Falls, but his head fell at the hands of my old friends Amy Post, Rhoda DeGarmo and Sarah Fish, who at once commenced laboring with me to prove the hour had come when a woman could preside and led me into the church. Amy proposed my name as president. It was accepted at once, and from that hour I seemed endowed as from on high to serve through two [sic] day's meetings and three sessions per day."

Bush died shortly after writing this letter, on December 10, 1898, in Vacaville, California.
