= Penrod (film) =

1922 film by Marshall Neilan

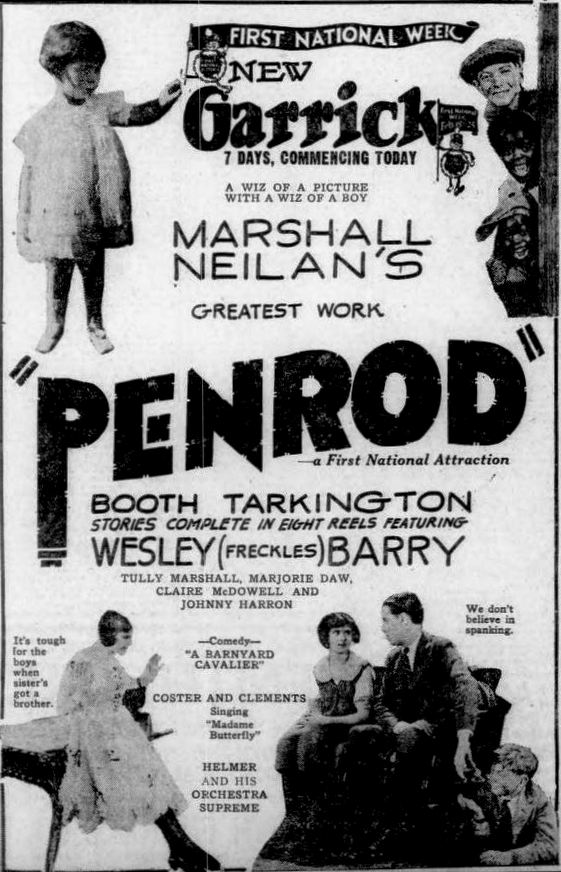
- Advertisement for Penrod on page 5 of the February 18, 1922 issue of the Duluth Herald
- Directed by: Marshall Neilan
- Screenplay by: Lucita Squier
- Based on: Penrod by Booth Tarkington
- Starring: Wesley Barry; Tully Marshall; Claire McDowell; John Harron; Gordon Griffith; Newton Hall
- Cinematography: David Kesson; Ray June
- Edited by: Daniel J. Gray
- Production company: Marshall Neilan Productions
- Distributed by: Associated First National Pictures
- Release date: February 20, 1922
- Running time: 80 minutes
- Country: United States
- Language: English

Penrod is a 1922 American comedy film directed by Marshall Neilan and written by Lucita Squier. It is based on the 1914 novel Penrod by Booth Tarkington. The film stars Wesley Barry, Tully Marshall, Claire McDowell, John Harron, Gordon Griffith and Newton Hall. The film was released on February 20, 1922, by Associated First National Pictures.

== Plot ==
Penrod Schofield is a mischievous boy who makes trouble in his community by protecting kids from overprotective and strict parents. He leads American Boys' Protective Association (ABPA) which engages in local society disruptions. People from his society are becoming frustrated with his behavior and when the town's outlaws arrive, Penrod shows his true color.

== Cast ==
- Wesley Barry as Penrod
- Tully Marshall as Mr. Schofield
- Claire McDowell as Mrs. Schofield
- John Harron as Robert Williams
- Gordon Griffith as Sam Williams
- Newton Hall as George Bassett
- Harry Griffith as Foster
- Cecil Holland as John Barrett
- Ernie Morrison as Herman
- Florence Morrison as Verman
- Marjorie Daw as Margaret
- Clara Horton as Marjorie Jones
- Peggy Jane as Baby Rennsdale
- Jackie Condon as Uncredited
- Peggy Cartwright as Uncredited

== Preservation ==
The film is now considered lost.
