= Rochester Women's Rights Convention of 1848 =

Meeting in Rochester, New York

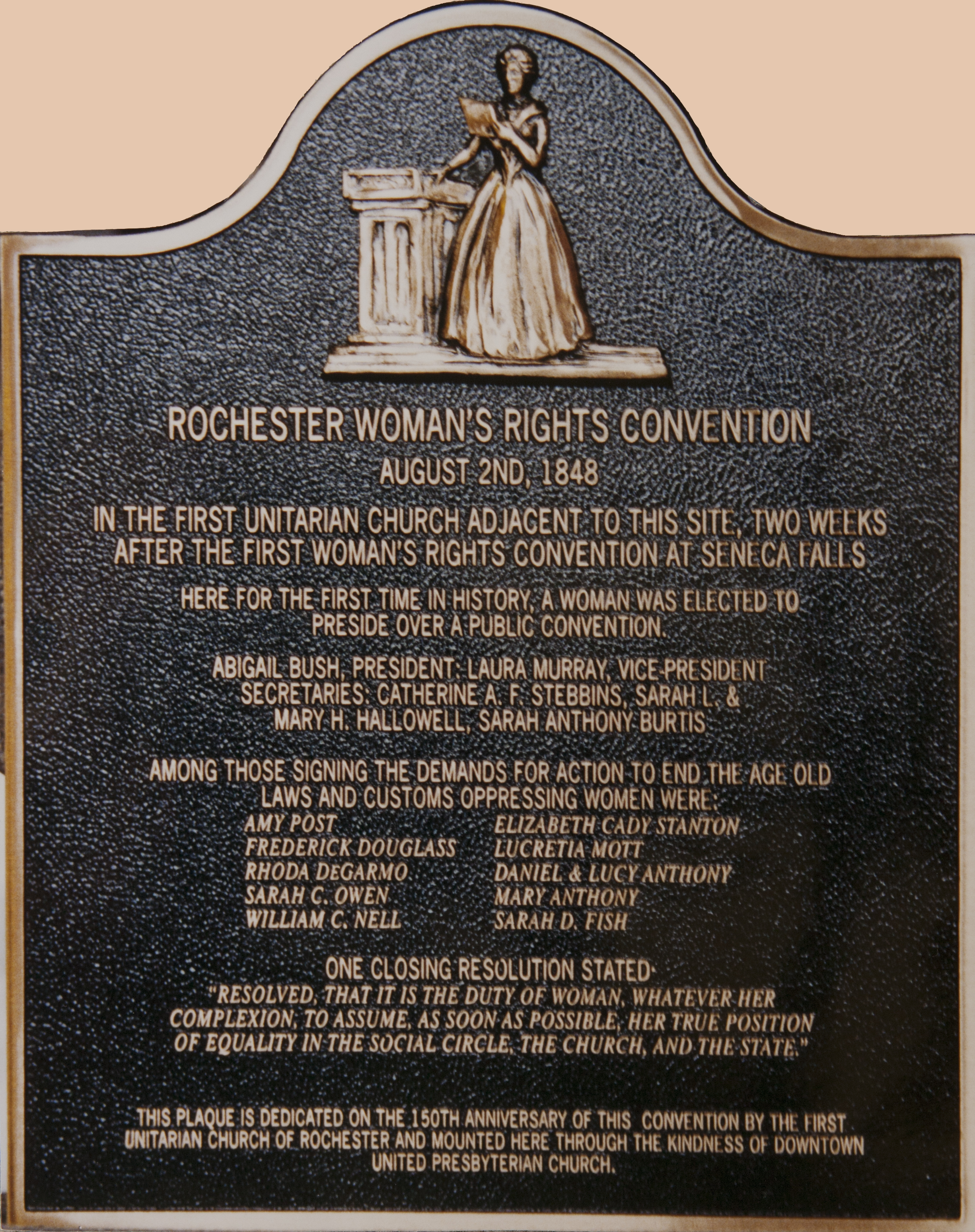
Plaque commemorating the Rochester Women's Rights Convention of 1848

The Rochester Women's Rights Convention of 1848 met on August 2, 1848 in Rochester, New York. Many of its organizers had participated in the Seneca Falls Convention, the first women's rights convention, two weeks earlier in Seneca Falls, a smaller town not far away. The Rochester convention elected Abigail Bush as its presiding officer, making it the first U.S. public meeting composed of both sexes to be presided by a woman. This controversial step was opposed even by some of the meeting's leading participants. The convention approved the Declaration of Sentiments that had first been introduced at the Seneca Falls Convention, including the controversial call for women's right to vote. It also discussed the rights of working women and took steps that led to the formation of a local organization to support those rights.

Many of the organizers of the convention were part of a group of Quaker dissidents who had begun to associate with the First Unitarian Church of Rochester, the site of the convention. This group included the family of Daniel and Lucy Anthony, whose daughter, Susan B. Anthony, later became the most prominent national leader of the women's suffrage movement.

== History ==
=== Background ===
Early women's rights activists had to deal with the prevailing belief that a woman was obligated to let her husband or other male relative speak for her in public settings. There was bitter opposition to the idea of women voicing their opinions to "promiscuous audiences," the name that was given to audiences that contained both men and women. In 1837, the Congregational Church of Massachusetts, a major force in that state, issued a pastoral letter to be read in every congregation that sharply criticized this practice, claiming it would "threaten the female character with wide-spread and permanent injury."

Despite the hostility, a small but growing number of women insisted on speaking out, especially in opposition to slavery. Some male abolitionists encouraged this practice while others refused to accept it. Disputes about the role of women began to disrupt the abolitionist movement, contributing to a split at a convention in 1840. Similar tensions were developing within educational institutions, which were just beginning to admit women at higher levels, and within the temperance movement. Concerned women activists in western New York organized the first women's rights convention, the Seneca Falls Convention, to discuss the rights of women on July 19–20, 1848 in the village of Seneca Falls. They called for similar conventions to be organized around the country.

=== Convention ===
Two weeks after the Seneca Falls Convention, several of its participants organized a follow-up convention in Rochester, New York, a city not far to the west that was the home of a number of reform activists. Like the earlier convention, the Rochester convention was open to anyone who was interested. Lucretia Mott, a prominent Quaker reform activist and an experienced public speaker who had been visiting the area from Philadelphia, was a featured speaker at Seneca Falls. At the plea of her friend Amy Post, one of the organizers of the Rochester convention, Mott agreed to stay in the area long enough to attend that convention also. The organizers gathered for a preliminary meeting on the day before the convention in Mechanics Protection Hall in Rochester to propose a slate of officers. Controversially, that slate included a woman, Abigail Bush, as president.

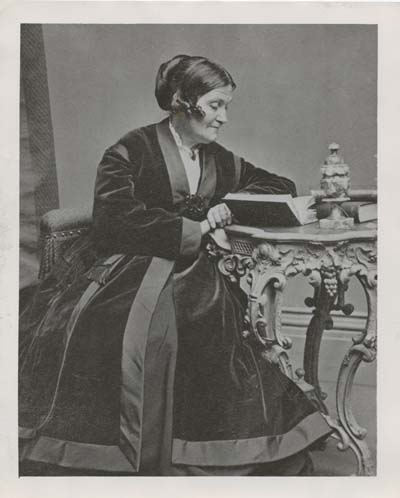
Abigail Bush

The Rochester Convention met on August 2, 1848 in First Unitarian Church of Rochester, which "was filled to overflowing." Amy Post called the convention to order and read the proposed slate of officers. Elizabeth McClintock, who was proposed as one of the convention's three secretaries, declined that position because she disagreed with the nomination of a woman as president. Bush's nomination as presiding officer was also opposed by Lucretia Mott and Elizabeth Cady Stanton, who "thought it a most hazardous experiment to have a woman President". (Mott and Stanton were key organizers of the Seneca Falls Convention, which had conceded to tradition by electing a man as its presiding officer.) Despite the misgivings of some of its most prominent members, the Rochester Convention elected Abigail Bush as its president, making it the first public meeting composed of both men and women in the U.S. to have a woman as its presiding officer. She conducted the meeting in a competent manner, quickly dispelling doubts about the wisdom of the convention's action.

Bush later said, "at the close of the first session Lucretia Mott came forward, folded me tenderly in her arms and thanked me for presiding... When I found that my labors were finished, my strength seemed to leave me and I cried like a baby. But that ended the feeling with women that they must have a man to preside at their meetings." Four years later, Mott herself presided at the Third National Women's Rights Convention in Syracuse. Stanton afterwards apologized for her "foolish conduct" at the Rochester convention in a letter to Amy Post, saying, "My only excuse is that woman has been so little accustomed to act in a public capacity that she does not always know what is due to those around her."

The secretaries of the convention were not accustomed to speaking in public. When they attempted to read the minutes of the preliminary meeting, they were unable to speak loudly enough to be heard throughout the room. Bush asked the audience to remember that the movement was still in its infancy and to listen with sympathy to speakers who had " trembling frames and faltering tongues." Sarah Anthony Burtis, a schoolteacher with experience in making her voice heard, volunteered to read the minutes.

The convention easily approved the Declaration of Sentiments that had been introduced at the Seneca Falls Convention, including the controversial demand for women's right to vote. Two African American men, Frederick Douglass and William Cooper Nell, both of whom were ardent abolitionists, spoke in favor of women's rights at the Rochester Convention. A few men engaged women activists in debate, arguing, for example, that a marriage of equal partners could not possibly work because there would be no one to make the final decision in case of disagreement. Lucretia Mott replied that she knew of such marriages within the Quaker community, and they were functioning well.

The convention included a discussion of the rights of working women. It called for equal pay for equal work, and it assigned a Mrs. Roberts the task of establishing a committee to investigate the condition of working women in Rochester. After the convention, she set up the Woman's Protection Union in Rochester.

Mott thanked the Rochester Unitarians for allowing a women's rights convention to meet in their church. A few years earlier, she said, when the Female Moral Reform Society of Philadelphia asked if they could hold their annual conference in a church, they were given permission to meet only in the basement and only if they agreed that women would not be permitted to speak. The society was obliged to bring in one clergyman to preside over the conference and another to read the reports that the women had prepared.

Newspapers in other communities generally were quite hostile to women's rights activities, but local newspaper coverage of this convention had a mixed nature. The Rochester Democrat said, "This has been a remarkable convention... The great effort seemed to be to bring out some new, impracticable, absurd, and ridiculous proposition, and the greater its absurdity the better." It approved, however, of the steps the convention had taken to ease the plight of working women. The Rochester Daily Advertiser made stereotyped references to men wearing petticoats and women wearing pants, but it approvingly noted that, "the discussions of the convention evinced a talent for forensic efforts seldom surpassed.

=== Related information ===
The Rochester Convention was organized primarily by a group of Hicksite Quakers who had resigned from their local congregation in the mid-1840s after it disapproved of their public involvement in anti-slavery activities. Several member of that group subsequently associated with the First Unitarian Church, a center for reform activity and the site of the convention. Of these, the Anthony family was particularly significant. Daniel and Lucy Anthony attended the Rochester Convention along with Mary Stafford Anthony, one of their daughters. Susan B. Anthony, another daughter, was teaching school in central New York at the time and did not attend the Rochester Convention. She later became, however, the most prominent national leader of the women's suffrage movement.

The History of Woman Suffrage, the first volume of which was written in 1881 by Elizabeth Cady Stanton, Susan B. Anthony and Matilda Joslyn Gage, said the participants in the Seneca Falls Convention knew they had more to discuss, so they "adjourned, to meet in Rochester in two weeks." In parliamentary procedure, an "adjourned meeting," also called a "continued meeting," is the name given to a meeting that is a continuation of an earlier meeting. The Rochester Convention is sometimes called the Adjourned Convention in Rochester.

The next women's rights convention after Rochester was the one in Ohio Women's Convention at Salem, Ohio in April, 1850, which, like the Seneca Falls and Rochester conventions, was a regional meeting. The first in a series of National Women's Rights Conventions met in Worcester, Massachusetts In October, 1850.

== Bibliography ==
- Gurko, Miriam (1974). The Ladies of Seneca Falls: The Birth of the Woman's Rights Movement, New York: Pantheon. ISBN 978-0805205459.
- Hewitt, Nancy A. (2001). Women's Activism and Social Change: Rochester, New York, 1822–1872. Lexington Books, Lanham, Maryland. ISBN 0-7391-0297-4.
- McMillen, Sally Gregory, (2008). Seneca Falls and the origins of the women's rights movement. Oxford University Press. ISBN 0-19-518265-0.
- Stanton, Elizabeth Cady; Anthony, Susan B.; Gage, Matilda Joslyn (1881). History of Woman Suffrage. Volume 1 of 6. Rochester, NY: Susan B. Anthony (Charles Mann Press).
- Wellman, Judith, (2004) The Road to Seneca Falls: Elizabeth Cady Stanton and the First Women's Rights Convention, University of Illinois Press. ISBN 0-252-02904-6
- Proceedings of the Woman's Rights Convention, Held at the Unitarian Church, Rochester, N.Y., August 2, 1848, To Consider the Rights of Woman, Politically, Religiously and Industrially, revised by Amy Post. Part of Proceedings of the Woman's Rights Conventions, Held at Seneca Falls & Rochester, N.Y., July & August, 1848, printed by Robert. J. Johnson, New York, 1870.
