= The Royal Oak (film) =

1923 film

- Directed by: Maurice Elvey
- Written by: Lucita Squier
- Based on: The Royal Oak by Henry Hamilton and Augustus Harris
- Starring: Betty Compson; Henry Ainley; Henry Victor; Clive Brook
- Production company: Stoll Pictures
- Distributed by: Stoll Pictures
- Release date: October 1923
- Running time: 82 minutes
- Country: United Kingdom
- Language: English

The Royal Oak is a 1923 British silent historical drama film directed by Maurice Elvey and starring Betty Compson, Henry Ainley and Henry Victor. It was based on the 1889 play The Royal Oak by Henry Hamilton and Augustus Harris. The title references the Royal Oak in which Charles is said to have hidden. The film proved popular and was re-released in 1929 by Equity British Films.

== Plot ==
A woman disguises herself as Charles II in order to allow the real King to escape Oliver Cromwell's troops after the Royalist defeat at the Battle of Worcester.

== Cast ==
- Betty Compson as Lady Mildred Cholmondeley
- Henry Ainley as Oliver Cromwell
- Henry Victor as Charles I of England/ Charles II of England
- Thurston Hall as Colonel Ancketell
- Clive Brook as Dorian Clavering
- Bertie Wright as Dearlove
- Peter Dear as Lord Cholmondeley
- Dallas Cairns as Pendrel
- Blanche Walker as Parry
- Rolf Leslie as Melchizedek
