= A Gamble with Hearts =

1923 film

- Directed by: Edwin J. Collins
- Written by: Anthony Carlyle; Lucita Squier
- Produced by: H.B. Parkinson
- Starring: Milton Rosmer; Madge Stuart; Olaf Hytten
- Production company: Master Films
- Distributed by: Woolf & Freedman Film Service
- Release date: 1923
- Country: United Kingdom

A Gamble with Hearts is a 1923 British silent crime film produced by Master Films, directed by Edwin J. Collins and starring Milton Rosmer, Madge Stuart, and Olaf Hytten. The film was adapted from a novel by Anthony Carlyle.

== Cast ==
- Milton Rosmer - Dallas Chalfont
- Madge Stuart - Morag Lannon
- Olaf Hytten - Dallas Junior
- Valia - Rosaleen Erle
- George Bishop - Inspector Duer
- Margaret Hope - Fanette Fraser
- Cecil Morton York - Vickers
- Mickey Brantford
- C. Hargrave Mansell
- Pat Fitzgerald
