= David Rhys Williams =

American Congregational and Unitarian minister and author (1890–1970)

David Rhys Williams (1890 – March 28, 1970) was an American Congregational and Unitarian minister who wrote a Marlovian book called Shakespeare Thy Name Is Marlowe.

== Biography ==
Rhys Williams was born in 1890 to David Thomas Williams. In 1919 he participated in the dispute resolution between the International Structural Steel and Iron Workers Union and the Contractors Association of Cleveland, Ohio, where he was a labor arbitrator. During the 1920s and 1930s he joined the League for Industrial Democracy and by 1936 became a member of its local planning committee in Rochester, New York. In 1928 he left the Third Unitarian Church of Chicago. He supported Soviet-American relations between 1929 and 1931, probably because his brother, Albert, was a journalist in Russia, and took part in the Open Road to Russia movement. From 1933 to 1934 he was a vice president of the Rochester Torch Club, and a year later became its president, holding that office for a year. From 1936 to 1937 he served as president of the Unitarian Fellowship for Social Justice. In 1938 he was charged with Communism by the Rochester Social Justice Club because of his opposition to the racist and anti-Semitic opinions of Charles Coughlin.

From 1928 to 1958 he served as minister at the First Unitarian Church of Rochester, and continued there as Minister Emeritus until his death. During the 1950s he stood in opposition to Senator Joseph McCarthy and to New York's Feinberg Law (which barred "subversives" from teaching in the state's public schools). Two years later he was given the Champion of the Oppressed award by the Unitarian Fellowship for Social Justice.

He advocated independence for India, Ireland, and the Philippines, and for the Jews to be permitted to settle in Palestine. He also was one of the signers of the Humanist Manifesto and was a member of the World Parliament of Religions. He sponsored the Emergency Committee in Cuba and the Mental Hygiene Society in Monroe County, New York. He supported the abolition of the House Un-American Committee. He was a chairman of the Rochester Committee to Aid Spanish Democracy. He advocated placing Susan B. Anthony in the Hall of Fame, and funding for the Black Affairs Council of the Unitarian Universalist Association.
