= Lucita Squier =

American screenwriter

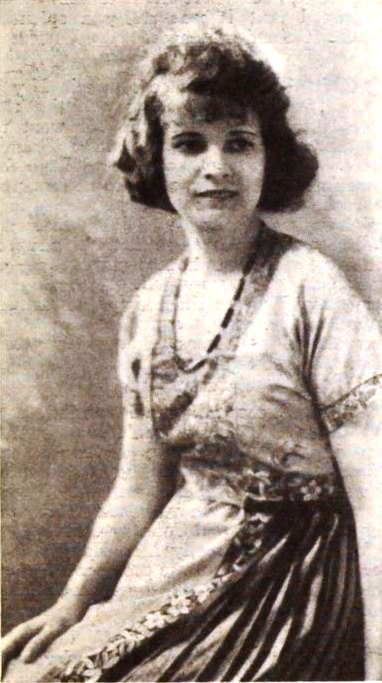
- Born: April 9, 1889; Buffalo, New York, USA
- Died: November 1980 (aged 91); Boston, Massachusetts, USA
- Occupation: Screenwriter
- Spouse: Albert Rhys Williams

Lucita Squier (April 9, 1889 – November 1980) (sometimes credited as Lucita Squier Williams) was an American screenwriter active during Hollywood's silent era. She wrote more than 50 scripts during the course of her career, working in the U.S., Britain, and Russia.

== Biography ==
Lucita was born in Buffalo, New York, to George Squier and Lucinda Lilliendahl. Her family had been wealthy thanks to the Mexican railroads they owned, but they lost most of their money during the Mexican Revolution, as she would later recount. She grew up speaking Spanish and vacationing in Mexico, attending school in New York City. At one point, she was the only girl attending the exclusive Horace Mann School.

After getting a job as a secretary in Hollywood through her family's connection to Cecil B. DeMille, she began writing scripts for Marshall Neilan's company, where she became lifelong friends with Mary Pickford. At the time, newspapers reported that with the release of her first script, Bits of Life, she was the youngest scenario writer to have a produced film under her belt. After heading back to New York City, she met and married journalist Albert Rhys Williams, and the pair later lived in Soviet Russia for seven years.

After their son was born, she moved to San Francisco, where she focused on raising her family. She made an attempt to break back into movies, which didn't pan out as script structure had changed with the advent of talkies. After her husband died, she moved to Boston.

She died in November 1980, and was survived by her son.

Squier appeared posthumously as one of the Witnesses in Warren Beatty’s 1981 film Reds.

== Selected filmography ==
- The Third Life of Mullah (1928) (lost)
- Tons of Money (1926)
- A Daughter of Love (1925)
- Straws in the Wind (1924)
- The Royal Oak (1923)
- A Gamble with Hearts (1923)
- Penrod (1922)
- Bits of Life (1921)
