= Albert Rhys Williams =

American journalist, labor organizer, and publicist

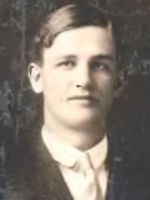
- Born: September 28, 1883; Greenwich, Ohio, United States
- Died: February 27, 1962 (aged 78)
- Education: Hartford Seminary
- Occupation: journalist

Albert Rhys Williams (September 28, 1883 – February 27, 1962), commonly known by his middle name, pronounced "Reece," was an American journalist, labor organizer, and publicist. He is most famous for writing memoirs in favor of the 1917 October Revolution in Russia: he had been both a witness and a participant.

== Early life ==
He was born in Greenwich, Ohio, on September 28, 1883, to David Thomas Williams, a Congregationalist minister, and Esther Rees (Rhys). Both of his parents were immigrants from Wales. All of Rhys's brothers (he was the second of four) followed in the footsteps of their father and became ministers. Of them, David Rhys Williams (one of two youngest) had a long and distinguished career in the Unitarian ministry.

At the end of the 1880s the family settled in the New York State resort community. In 1897, Albert graduated from high school in Hancock, New York. Then, he worked for some time in a lumber yard in Apex, New York. Later, he moved to Ohio where he worked at a clothing store until he was old enough to enter college.

In 1900, he went to a college in Marietta, Ohio, where he studied until 1904. At Marietta College, he made his first steps in journalism, being an editor of the college newspaper. Also, he helped to organize a union for retail clerks in Marietta.

In 1904 to 1907 Williams studied at the Hartford Theological Seminary, having graduated it with a license to preach. There, he also edited a labor column for the Hartford Evening Post. With a preacher's license in the summer of 1907, Williams worked at the Settlement House of the Spring Street Presbyterian Church, in New York City. In New York, Rhys met Norman Thomas (later the Socialist Party presidential candidate), who was then a Presbyterian seminarian. In those years, they both organized men's club debates.

In 1907 to 1908 Williams was studying on a fellowship at Cambridge University and the University of Marburg. There, he met members of the British Labour Party and other socialists. On his return to the United States, Williams worked for the 1908 presidential campaign of Socialist Eugene Debs. Then, Williams returned to his main profession as a minister of the Maverick Square Congregational Church in East Boston (1908 to 1914). However he did not abandon the labor and social issues at all. In 1912, Williams raised money and spoke up for the workers during the 1912 textile strike in Lawrence, Massachusetts. Williams first met John Reed, whose acquaintance played a role in his upcoming interest in Russia and then his trip to this far overseas country.

== World War I ==
In 1914, however, upon outbreak of war in Europe, he went to Belgium, originally to perform relief work for civilian refugees. He later wrote a book about his early experiences during his stay in Belgium in 1914 was In the Claws of the German Eagle, published in 1917. He joined a group of British reporters and cameramen and recounted somewhat humorously how some so-called 'action-photos' were taken at the time: bored soldiers willingly posed for simulated scenes of fighting. He himself was posed as a 'German spy' and photographed. The photograph later got printed and was used worldwide in the printed media as an authentic picture.

== Soviet sympathizer ==
Williams first came into contact with the Bolsheviks in 1917 as a correspondent for the New York Post. He attended the Storming of the Winter Palace, met and became close friends with Vladimir Lenin, and stayed in the country until 1918. Upon his return to the United States, he worked as a pro-Soviet and Communist activist. Williams was a vocal opponent of the Allied intervention in the Russian Civil War and deployment of American troops on Russian soil, stating, "I never ceased to feel shame for the role my country played in this joint effort to strangle bolshevism in its cradle and socialism for good and all." He eventually volunteered for service in the Red Army, and was placed in charge of organizing an International Legion. Williams wrote of this, "If I helped in some small way to mitigate the guilt of being an American, I am satisfied."

Williams lived on and off in Russia, first moving there at the outbreak of the Russian Civil War and last leaving sometime after marrying Lucita Squier in 1923, thereafter only returning to visit in 1930, 1937, and 1959. During his period of relations with the Soviets, he authored a number of related books and papers. Though later personally critical of Joseph Stalin, he refused to publicly criticize the Union itself, and maintained a pro-Soviet stance for the rest of his life. Before his death, Williams wrote, "If I have remained true to the Revolution and still look forward to the final triumph of socialism in the world, it is because, like Lenin, I do believe in the essential goodness of man."

== Works ==
- In the Claws of the German Eagle. New York, E.P. Dutton and Co., 1917.
- Questions and Answers about Russia: An Extract from a Verbatim Report of a Conversation with Albert Rhys Williams, an American War Correspondent and Author Who Returned from Russia in the Autumn of 1918 as an Authorised Messenger from Lenin and the Soviet Government. London: Workers' Socialist Federation, n.d. [1918].
- The Bolsheviks and the Soviets: Seventy-six Questions and Answers on the Workingman's Government of Russia. Brooklyn, NY: Socialist Publication Society, 1918. —Reprinted under various titles.
- The Bolsheviks and the Soviets: The Present Government of Russia, What the Soviets Have Done, Difficulties the Soviets Faced, Six Charges against the Soviets, the Soviet Leaders and the Bolsheviks, the Russians and America. New York: Rand School of Social Science, 1919.
- Soviet Russia and Siberia. Chicago: Charles H. Kerr and Co., 1919.
- Soviet Russia: An Address. Chicago: Charles H. Kerr and Co., 1919.
- Lenin: the Man and His Work. New York: Scott and Seltzer, 1919.
- Through the Russian Revolution. New York: Boni and Liveright, 1921.
- The Russian Land. New York: The New Republic, 1927.
- The Soviets. New York, Harcourt, Brace and Co., 1937.
- The Russians: The Land, the People, and Why They Fight. New York, Harcourt, Brace and Co., 1943.
- Journey Into Revolution; Petrograd, 1917-1918. New York, Quadrangle Books, 1969.
- Through the Russian Revolution. Moscow: Progress Publishers. 1973. (contains both Lenin: the Man and His Work and Through the Russian Revolution)
